= List of historically black colleges and universities =

This list of historically Black colleges and universities (HBCUs) includes institutions of higher education in the United States that were established before 1964 with the intention of primarily serving the African-American community.

Most HBCUs are located in the Southern United States, where state laws generally required educational segregation until the 1950s and 1960s. Alabama has the highest number of HBCUs, followed by North Carolina, and then Georgia.

The list of closed colleges includes some that, because of state laws, were racially segregated. In other words, those colleges are not designated as historically Black; they were demographically majority Black for as long as they existed.

== Current institutions ==
Locations of HBCUs in the continental United States (as of 2022). Blue markers indicate a city with one or more public institutions. Red markers indicate a city with one or more private institutions. Purple markers indicate a city with both public and private HBCUs. The University of the Virgin Islands (public) is outside the map area.

Institution	City	State/ territory	Founded	Type	Comment	Regionally accredited
Alabama A&M University	Normal (Note: Mailing address is Huntsville.)	Alabama	1875	Public	Founded as Colored Normal School at Huntsville	Yes
Alabama State University	Montgomery	Alabama	1867	Public	Founded as Lincoln Normal School of Marion	Yes
Albany State University	Albany	Georgia	1903	Public	Founded as Albany Bible and Manual Training Institute	Yes
Alcorn State University	Lorman (Note: Mailing address; the campus is physically located in unincorporated Claiborne County and is designated by the US Census Bureau as "Alcorn State, Mississippi".)	Mississippi	1871	Public	Founded as Alcorn University, in honor of James L. Alcorn	Yes
Allen University	Columbia	South Carolina	1870	Private (Note: Part of the African Methodist Episcopal Church)	Founded as Payne Institute	Yes
American Baptist College	Nashville	Tennessee	1924	Private (Note: Part of the National Baptist Convention, USA, Inc.)	Federal designation as a historically Black college or university was awarded on March 20, 2013, by the U.S. Education Department.	Yes
University of Arkansas at Pine Bluff	Pine Bluff	Arkansas	1873	Public	Founded as Branch Normal College	Yes
Arkansas Baptist College	Little Rock	Arkansas	1884	Private (Note: Part of the Consolidated Missionary Baptist State Convention)	Founded as Minister's Institute	Yes
Barber–Scotia College	Concord	North Carolina	1867	Private (Note: Part of the Presbyterian Church (USA))	Founded as two institutions, Scotia Seminary and Barber Memorial College	No
Benedict College	Columbia	South Carolina	1870	Private (Note: Part of the American Baptist Churches USA)	Founded as Benedict Institute	Yes
Bennett College	Greensboro	North Carolina	1873	Private (Note: Part of the United Methodist Church)	Founded as Bennett Seminary	Yes
Bethune–Cookman University	Daytona Beach	Florida	1904	Private	Founded as Daytona Educational and Industrial Training School for Negro Girls	Yes
Bishop State Community College	Mobile	Alabama	1927	Public	Originally a branch of Alabama State College	Yes
Bluefield State University	Bluefield	West Virginia	1895	Public	Founded as Bluefield Colored Institute	Yes
Bowie State University	Bowie	Maryland	1865	Public	Founded as Baltimore Normal School	Yes
Central State University	Wilberforce	Ohio	1887	Public	Originally a department at Wilberforce University	Yes
Cheyney University of Pennsylvania	Cheyney	Pennsylvania	1837	Public	The oldest HBCU. Founded by Quaker philanthropist Richard Humphreys as Institute for Colored Youth.	Yes
Claflin University	Orangeburg	South Carolina	1869	Private		Yes
Clark Atlanta University	Atlanta	Georgia	1865	Private	Originally two institutions, Clark College and Atlanta University	Yes
Clinton College	Rock Hill	South Carolina	1894	Private (Note: Part of the African Methodist Episcopal Zion Church)	Founded as Clinton Institute	Yes
Coahoma Community College	Coahoma County	Mississippi	1924	Public	Founded as Coahoma County Agricultural High School	Yes
Coppin State University	Baltimore	Maryland	1900	Public	Founded as Colored High School	Yes
Delaware State University	Dover	Delaware	1891	Public (Note: Delaware State is legally chartered as a "privately governed, state-assisted" institution. This status is broadly similar to that of New York State's statutory colleges, mostly housed at Cornell University, or institutions in Pennsylvania's Commonwealth System of Higher Education.)	Founded as the Delaware College for Colored Students	Yes
Denmark Technical College	Denmark	South Carolina	1947	Public	Founded as Denmark Area Trade School	Yes
Dillard University	New Orleans	Louisiana	1869	Private (Note: Part of the United Church of Christ)	Founding predecessor institutions: Straight University and New Orleans University	Yes
University of the District of Columbia	Washington	District of Columbia	1851	Public	Founded as Miner Normal School	Yes
Edward Waters University	Jacksonville	Florida	1866	Private	Founded as Brown Theological Institute	Yes
Elizabeth City State University	Elizabeth City	North Carolina	1891	Public	Founded as State Colored Normal School at Elizabeth City	Yes
Fayetteville State University	Fayetteville	North Carolina	1867	Public	Founded as Howard School	Yes
Fisk University	Nashville	Tennessee	1866	Private	Named for Clinton Bowen Fisk	Yes
Florida A&M University	Tallahassee	Florida	1887	Public	Founded as State Normal College for Colored Students	Yes
Florida Memorial University	Miami Gardens	Florida	1879	Private	Founded as Florida Baptist Institute in Live Oak	Yes
Fort Valley State University	Fort Valley	Georgia	1895	Public	Founded as Fort Valley High and Industrial School	Yes
Gadsden State Community College	Gadsden	Alabama	1925	Public	Founded as Alabama School of Trades	Yes
Grambling State University	Grambling	Louisiana	1901	Public	Founded as Colored Industrial and Agricultural School	Yes
Hampton University	Hampton	Virginia	1868	Private (Note: Nonsectarian college or university, with no religious affiliation)	Founded as Hampton Normal and Agricultural Institute	Yes
Harris–Stowe State University	St. Louis	Missouri	1857	Public	Founded as St. Louis Normal School for whites in 1857, with Stowe Teachers College begun in 1890 for Blacks; merged in 1954	Yes
Hinds Community College at Utica	Utica	Mississippi	1903	Public	Founded as Utica Junior College	Yes
Howard University	Washington	District of Columbia	1867	Private	Named for Oliver Otis Howard, head of the Freedmen's Bureau	Yes
Huston–Tillotson University	Austin	Texas	1875	Private	Founded as Tillotson Collegiate and Normal Institute	Yes
Interdenominational Theological Center	Atlanta	Georgia	1958	Private (Note: Multiple affiliations)		Yes
J. F. Drake State Technical College	Huntsville	Alabama	1961	Public	Founded as Huntsville State Vocational Technical School	Yes
Jackson State University	Jackson	Mississippi	1877	Public	Founded as Natchez Seminary by the American Baptist Home Mission Society, became public in 1942	Yes
Jarvis Christian University	Hawkins	Texas	1912	Private (Note: Part of the Christian Church (Disciples of Christ))		Yes
Johnson C. Smith University	Charlotte	North Carolina	1867	Private	Founded as Biddle Memorial Institute	Yes
Kentucky State University	Frankfort	Kentucky	1886	Public	Founded as State Normal School for Colored Persons	Yes
Knoxville College	Knoxville	Tennessee	1875	Private (Note: Part of the United Presbyterian Church of North America)		No
Lane College	Jackson	Tennessee	1882	Private (Note: Part of the Christian Methodist Episcopal Church)	Founded as Colored Methodist Episcopal High School	Yes
Langston University	Langston	Oklahoma	1897	Public	Founded as Oklahoma Colored Agricultural and Normal University	Yes
Lawson State Community College	Bessemer	Alabama	1949	Public		Yes
LeMoyne–Owen College	Memphis	Tennessee	1862	Private	Founded as LeMoyne Normal and Commercial School (elementary school until 1870)	Yes
Lincoln University	Chester County	Pennsylvania	1854	Public	The first degree-granting HBCU; founded as Ashmun Institute	Yes
Lincoln University of Missouri	Jefferson City	Missouri	1866	Public	Founded as Lincoln Institute	Yes
Livingstone College	Salisbury	North Carolina	1879	Private	Founded as Zion Wesley Institute	Yes
University of Maryland Eastern Shore	Princess Anne (Note: Mailing address; the campus is physically located in unincorporated Somerset County.)	Maryland	1886	Public (Note: Originally and formerly part of the Methodist Episcopal Church)	Founded as Delaware Conference Academy	Yes
Meharry Medical College	Nashville	Tennessee	1876	Private	Founded as the Medical Department of Central Tennessee College	Yes
Miles College	Fairfield	Alabama	1898	Private	Known until 1941 as Miles Memorial College; named after Bishop William H. Miles	Yes
Mississippi Valley State University	Itta Bena (Note: Mailing address; the campus is physically located in unincorporated Leflore County and is designated by the US Census Bureau as Mississippi Valley State, Mississippi.)	Mississippi	1950	Public	Founded as Mississippi Vocational College	Yes
Morehouse College	Atlanta	Georgia	1867	Private (Note: Originally and formerly part of the American Baptist Home Mission Society)	Founded as Augusta Institute	Yes
Morehouse School of Medicine	Atlanta	Georgia	1975	Private	Founded as a part of Morehouse College	Yes
Morgan State University	Baltimore	Maryland	1867	Public	Founded as Centenary Biblical Institute	Yes
Morris Brown College	Atlanta	Georgia	1881	Private	Named after the second bishop in the African Methodist Episcopal Church	Yes
Morris College	Sumter	South Carolina	1908	Private (Note: Part of the Baptist Educational and Missionary Convention of South Carolina)		Yes
Norfolk State University	Norfolk	Virginia	1935	Public	Founded as Norfolk Unit of Virginia State University	Yes
North Carolina Agricultural & Technical State University	Greensboro	North Carolina	1891	Public	Founded as the Agricultural & Mechanical College for the Colored Race	Yes
North Carolina Central University	Durham	North Carolina	1910	Public	Founded as National Religious Training School and Chautauqua	Yes
Oakwood University	Huntsville	Alabama	1896	Private (Note: Part of the Seventh-day Adventist Church)	Founded as Oakwood Industrial School	Yes
Paine College	Augusta	Georgia	1882	Private	Founded as Paine Institute	Yes
Paul Quinn College	Dallas	Texas	1872	Private	Named for William Paul Quinn	Yes
Payne Theological Seminary	Wilberforce	Ohio	1856	Private	Named for Bishop Daniel Payne. Founded as a seminary with Wilberforce University in 1856. Became Payne Theological Seminary in 1894.	Yes
Philander Smith University	Little Rock	Arkansas	1877	Private	Founded as Walden Seminary	Yes
Prairie View A&M University	Prairie View	Texas	1876	Public	Founded as Alta Vista Agriculture & Mechanical College for Colored Youth	Yes
Rust College	Holly Springs	Mississippi	1866	Private	Known as Shaw University until 1882	Yes
Savannah State University	Savannah	Georgia	1890	Public	Founded as Georgia State Industrial College for Colored Youth	Yes
Selma University	Selma	Alabama	1878	Private (Note: Part of the Alabama State Missionary Baptist Convention)	Founded as Alabama Baptist Normal and Theological School	Yes
Shaw University	Raleigh	North Carolina	1865	Private	Founded as Raleigh Institute	Yes
Shorter College	North Little Rock	Arkansas	1886	Private	Two-year college; founded as Bethel University	Yes
Shelton State Community College	Tuscaloosa	Alabama	1952	Public	Founded as J.P. Shelton Trade School	Yes
Simmons College	Louisville	Kentucky	1869	Private	Founded as Kentucky Normal Technological Institute	Yes
South Carolina State University	Orangeburg	South Carolina	1896	Public	Founded as Colored, Normal, Industrial, Agricultural, and Mechanical College of South Carolina	Yes
Southern University at New Orleans	New Orleans	Louisiana	1956	Public	Founded as a branch unit of Southern University in Baton Rouge	Yes
Southern University at Shreveport	Shreveport	Louisiana	1967	Public	Part of the Southern University System	Yes
Southern University and A&M College	Baton Rouge	Louisiana	1880	Public	Conceptualized by P. B. S. Pinchback, T. T. Allain, and Henry Demas	Yes
Southwestern Christian College	Terrell	Texas	1948	Private (Note: Part of the Churches of Christ)	Founded as Southern Bible Institute	Yes
Spelman College	Atlanta	Georgia	1881	Private	Founded as Atlanta Baptist Female Seminary	Yes
St. Augustine's University	Raleigh	North Carolina	1867	Private (Note: Part of the Episcopal Church)	Founded as St. Augustine's Normal School and Collegiate Institute	No
St. Philip's College	San Antonio	Texas	1898	Public (Note: Formerly part of the Episcopal Church)	Founded as St. Philip's Sewing Class for Girls	Yes
Stillman College	Tuscaloosa	Alabama	1876	Private	Founded as Tuscaloosa Institute, the college was a concept of Reverend Dr. Charles Allen Stillman, pastor of First Presbyterian Church of Tuscaloosa	Yes
Talladega College	Talladega	Alabama	1867	Private	Known as Swayne School until 1869	Yes
Tennessee State University	Nashville	Tennessee	1912	Public	Founded as Agricultural and Industrial State Normal School	Yes
Texas College	Tyler	Texas	1894	Private		Yes
Texas Southern University	Houston	Texas	1927	Public	Founded as Texas State University for Negroes	Yes
Tougaloo College	Jackson	Mississippi	1869	Private (Note: Part of the American Missionary Association)	Founded as Tougaloo University	Yes
Trenholm State Community College	Montgomery	Alabama	1947	Public	Founded as John M. Patterson Technical School	Yes
Tuskegee University	Tuskegee	Alabama	1881	Private	Founded as Tuskegee Institute, now a National Historic Site	Yes
University of the Virgin Islands	St. Croix & St. Thomas	United States Virgin Islands	1962	Public	Founded as College of the Virgin Islands	Yes
Virginia State University	Petersburg (Note: Mailing address; the campus is physically located in Ettrick.)	Virginia	1882	Public	Founded as Virginia Normal and Collegiate Institute at Petersburg	Yes
Virginia Union University	Richmond	Virginia	1865	Private	Founded as Wayland Seminary, and merged with Richmond Institute (1865) in 1889	Yes
Virginia University of Lynchburg	Lynchburg	Virginia	1886	Private (Note: Part of the Virginia Baptist State Convention)	Founded as Lynchburg Baptist Seminary	Yes
Voorhees University	Denmark	South Carolina	1897	Private	Founded as Denmark Industrial School	Yes
West Virginia State University	Institute	West Virginia	1891	Public	Founded as West Virginia Colored Institute	Yes
Wilberforce University	Wilberforce	Ohio	1856	Private	Named for William Wilberforce. Oldest HBCU to retain its original name, and the first college to be owned and operated by African-Americans.	Yes
Wiley University	Marshall	Texas	1873	Private	Named for Isaac William Wiley; was Wiley College from 1929 to 2023	Yes
Winston-Salem State University	Winston-Salem	North Carolina	1892	Public	Founded as Slater Industrial and State Normal School	Yes
Xavier University of Louisiana	New Orleans	Louisiana	1915	Private (Note: Part of the Sisters of the Blessed Sacrament of the Catholic Church)	Founded as Xavier Preparatory High School	Yes

== Defunct institutions ==
Institution	City	State	Founded	Closed	Type	Comment
Bishop College	Dallas	Texas	1881	1988	Private (Note: Originally and formerly part of the American Baptist Home Mission Society)	Founded in Marshall, Texas; later moved to Dallas
Bishop Payne Divinity School	Petersburg	Virginia	1878	1949	Private (Note: Part of the Episcopal Church)	Before gaining the right to award bachelor's degrees in 1910, it was the Bishop Payne Divinity and Industrial School. When first founded it was a "normal and industrial" school.
Booker T. Washington Junior College	Pensacola	Florida	1949	1965	Public	The first of twelve black junior colleges created in Florida, it closed after passage of the Civil Rights Act of 1964. Nominally merged with Pensacola Junior College.
Carver Junior College	Cocoa	Florida	1960	1963	Public	One of eleven black junior colleges founded in Florida after the Brown v. Board of Education decision, in an attempt to show that separate but equal higher education facilities existed in Florida. All were abruptly closed after passage of the 1964 Civil Rights Act.
Collier-Blocker Junior College	Palatka	Florida	1960	1964	Public	One of eleven black junior colleges founded in Florida after the Brown v. Board of Education decision, in an attempt to show that separate but equal higher education facilities existed in Florida. All were abruptly closed after passage of the 1964 Civil Rights Act.
Concordia College Alabama	Selma	Alabama	1922	2018	Private (Note: Part of the Lutheran Church–Missouri Synod)	Known as "Alabama Lutheran Academy and Junior College" until 1981; It was the only historically black college among the ten colleges and universities in the Concordia University System. The college ceased operations at the completion of the Spring 2018 semester, citing years of financial distress and declining enrollment.
Daniel Payne College	Birmingham	Alabama	1889	1979	Private (Note: Part of the African Methodist Episcopal Church)	
Friendship College	Rock Hill	South Carolina	1891	1981	Private (Note: A Baptist institution)	
George R. Smith College	Sedalia	Missouri	1894	1925	Private (Note: Nonsectarian college or university, with no religious affiliation)	It burned down on April 26, 1925, after which its assets were merged (in 1933) with the Philander Smith College.
Georgia Baptist College	Macon	Georgia	1899	1956	Private	Originally known as Central City College, renamed in 1938
Gibbs Junior College	St. Petersburg	Florida	1957	1966	Public	Regionally accredited. Founded to show that separate but equal educational institutions for African-Americans were viable, and that racial integration, mandated by Brown v. Board of Education, was unnecessary. Closed shortly after passage of the Civil Rights Act of 1964; nominally merged with St. Petersburg Junior College (today St. Petersburg College).
Guadalupe College	Seguin	Texas	1884	1936	Private (Note: Part of the Texas Missionary Baptist General Convention)	Ceased operations after a fire destroyed the main building in 1936
Hampton Junior College	Ocala	Florida	1958	1966	Public	One of eleven black junior colleges founded in Florida after the Brown v. Board of Education decision, in an attempt to show that separate but equal higher education facilities existed in Florida. All were abruptly closed after passage of the 1964 Civil Rights Act.
Immanuel Lutheran College	Greensboro	North Carolina	1903	1961	Private (Note: Part of the Evangelical Lutheran Synodical Conference)	The college was closed in 1961 when the Synodical Conference decided that the training of Blacks should be integrated into the educational institutions of the Lutheran Church–Missouri Synod, the largest member of the conference. The state of North Carolina purchased the campus for $239,000 and it eventually became the East Campus of North Carolina A&T State University.
J. P. Campbell College	Started in Vicksburg, moved to Jackson in 1898	Mississippi	1890	1964	Private	Located across the street from Jackson College, now Jackson State University, J. P. Campbell College famously admitted students expelled from high school for participating in the Civil Rights Movement. Then, amidst a failed plan to relocate to Mound Bayou, Mississippi, a Black town, it collapsed financially.
Jackson Junior College	Marianna	Florida	1961	1966	Public	One of eleven black junior colleges founded in Florida after the Brown v. Board of Education decision, in an attempt to show that separate but equal higher education facilities existed in Florida. All were abruptly closed after passage of the 1964 Civil Rights Act.
Johnson Junior College	Leesburg	Florida	1960	1966	Public	One of eleven black junior colleges founded in Florida after the Brown v. Board of Education decision, in an attempt to show that separate but equal higher education facilities existed in Florida. All were abruptly closed after passage of the 1964 Civil Rights Act.
Kittrell College	Kittrell	North Carolina	1886	1975	Private	
Leland University	New Orleans	Louisiana	1870	1960	Private	Founded as a grade school in New Orleans, Leland was a Baker, Louisiana-based Baptist University when it closed.
Lewis College of Business	Detroit	Michigan	1928	2013	Private	Founded as "Lewis Business College", in the process of being reopened under the new name Pensole Lewis College of Business & Design
Lincoln Junior College	Fort Pierce	Florida	1960	1966	Public	One of eleven black junior colleges founded in Florida after the Brown v. Board of Education decision, in an attempt to show that separate but equal higher education facilities existed in Florida. All were abruptly closed after passage of the 1964 Civil Rights Act.
Louisville Municipal College	Louisville	Kentucky	1931	1951	Public	Formed as a segregated campus of University of Louisville on the foreclosed campus of Simmons College of Kentucky. Merged into University of Louisville as part of integrating U of L.
Luther College	New Orleans	Louisiana	1903	1925	Private	
Mary Holmes College	West Point	Mississippi	1892	2005	Private (Note: Part of the Presbyterian Church (USA))	
Mississippi Industrial College	Holly Springs	Mississippi	1905	1982	Private (Note: Part of the Christian Methodist Episcopal Church)	
Morristown College	Morristown	Tennessee	1881	1996	Private (Note: Part of the Methodist Episcopal Church)	Founded as a seminary and normal school in the late 1870s, became Knoxville College's satellite campus in 1989, and closed for good in 1996
Mount Hermon Female Seminary	Clinton	Mississippi	1875	1924	Private (Note: Part of the American Missionary Association)	
Natchez College	Natchez	Mississippi	1885	1993	Private	
Payne College	Cuthbert	Georgia	1879	1912	Private	On June 5, 1912, it became part of Morris Brown University.
Roger Williams University	Nashville	Tennessee	1864	1929	Private	Two suspicious fires destroyed its main building in 1905. Financial problems led to its closure in 1929; combined with other institutions to form LeMoyne–Owen College.
Roosevelt Junior College	West Palm Beach	Florida	1958	1965	Public	Regionally accredited. One of eleven black junior colleges founded in Florida after the Brown v. Board of Education decision, in an attempt to show that separate but equal higher education facilities existed in Florida. All were abruptly closed after passage of the 1964 Civil Rights Act.
Rosenwald Junior College	Panama City	Florida	1958	1966	Public	One of eleven black junior colleges founded in Florida after the Brown v. Board of Education decision, in an attempt to show that separate but equal higher education facilities existed in Florida. All were abruptly closed after passage of the 1964 Civil Rights Act.
Saint Paul's College	Lawrenceville	Virginia	1888	2013	Private	Founded as "Saint Paul Normal and Industrial School". Closed June 2013.
Saints College	Lexington	Mississippi	1918	2006	Private (Note: Part of the Church of God in Christ)	Originated as Saints Junior College and Academy
Southern Christian Institute	Edwards	Mississippi	1908?	1954	Private (Note: Part of the United Christian Missionary Society Church)	Merged into Tougaloo College. For a time thereafter its campus, renamed Mt. Beulah, was used by the Delta Ministry, CDGM, and other civil rights organizations.
Storer College	Harpers Ferry	West Virginia	1865	1955	Public (Note: Originally founded by the Freewill Baptist Missionary Society)	Not regionally accredited. Its endowment was transferred to Virginia Union, where its alumni have been recognized, and its physical assets were given to Alderson-Broaddus College to create scholarships for Black students. Its former campus is now part of the Harpers Ferry National Historical Park.
Suwannee River Junior College	Madison	Florida	1959	1966	Public	One of eleven black junior colleges founded in Florida after the Brown v. Board of Education decision, in an attempt to show that separate but equal higher education facilities existed in Florida. All were abruptly closed after passage of the 1964 Civil Rights Act.
Turner College	Shelbyville	Tennessee	1888	c1929	Private	Established by the AME Church, Turner was named for a bishop of the church. Along with a normal school, it included a high school, an "industrial institute," and a Bible study institute.
Volusia County Junior College	Daytona Beach	Florida	1958	1965	Public	One of eleven black junior colleges founded in Florida after the Brown v. Board of Education decision, in an attempt to show that separate but equal higher education facilities existed in Florida. All were abruptly closed after passage of the 1964 Civil Rights Act.
Western University	Quindaro, Kansas City	Kansas	1865	1943	Private	Had the first statue of abolitionist John Brown, which is all that survives of the campus
