= List of colleges and universities in Florida =

The following is a list of accredited colleges and universities in the U.S. state of Florida. Many of these schools have multiple campuses, and therefore only the location of the main campus in Florida is specified. Most public institutions and traditional private institutions in Florida are accredited by the Southern Association of Colleges and Schools; religious schools are accredited by the Association of Advanced Rabbinical and Talmudic Schools (AARTS), the Association of Theological Schools in the United States and Canada (ATS), the Association for Biblical Higher Education (ABHE), and the Transnational Association of Christian Colleges and Schools (TRACS).

== Public colleges and universities ==
=== State University System ===
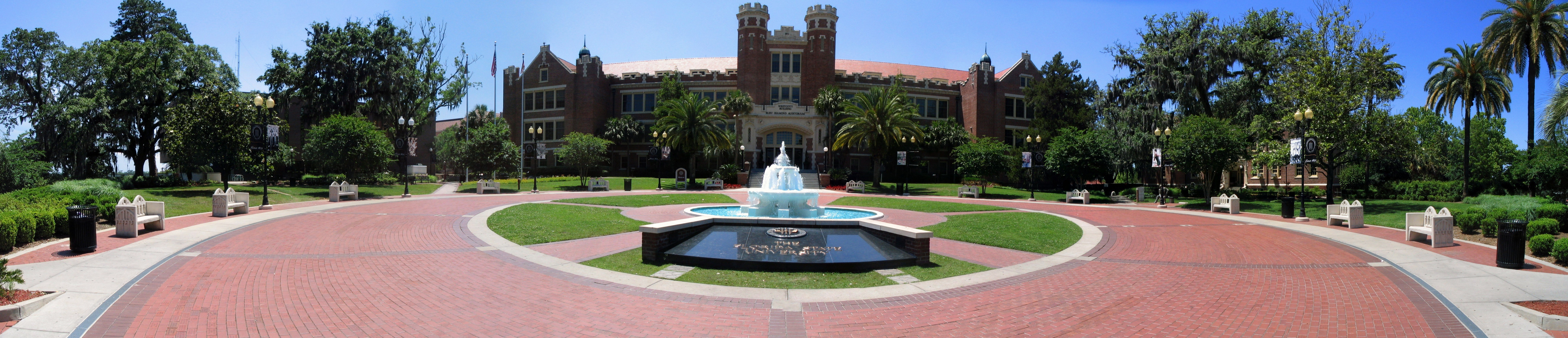
Florida State University

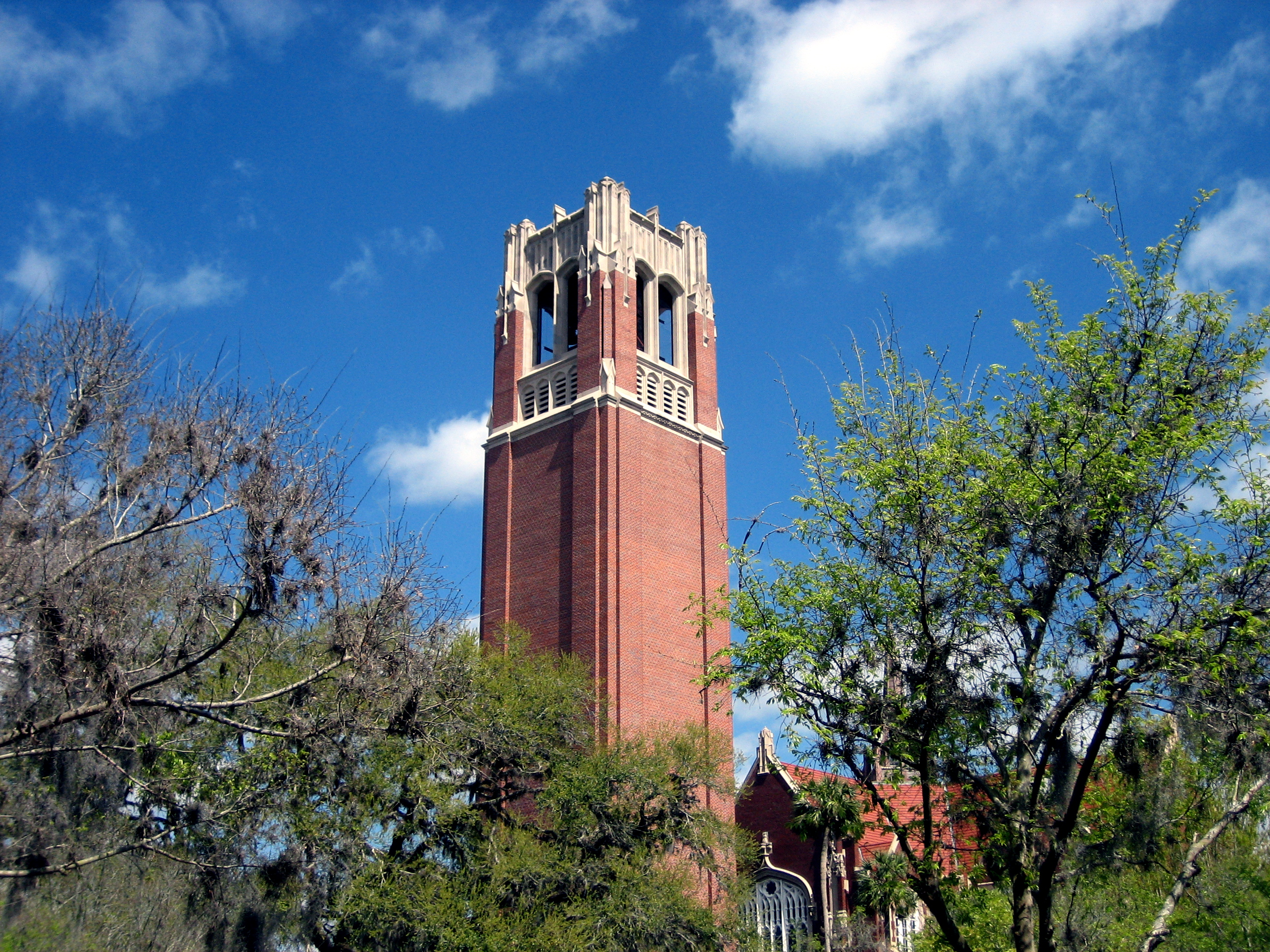
University of Florida

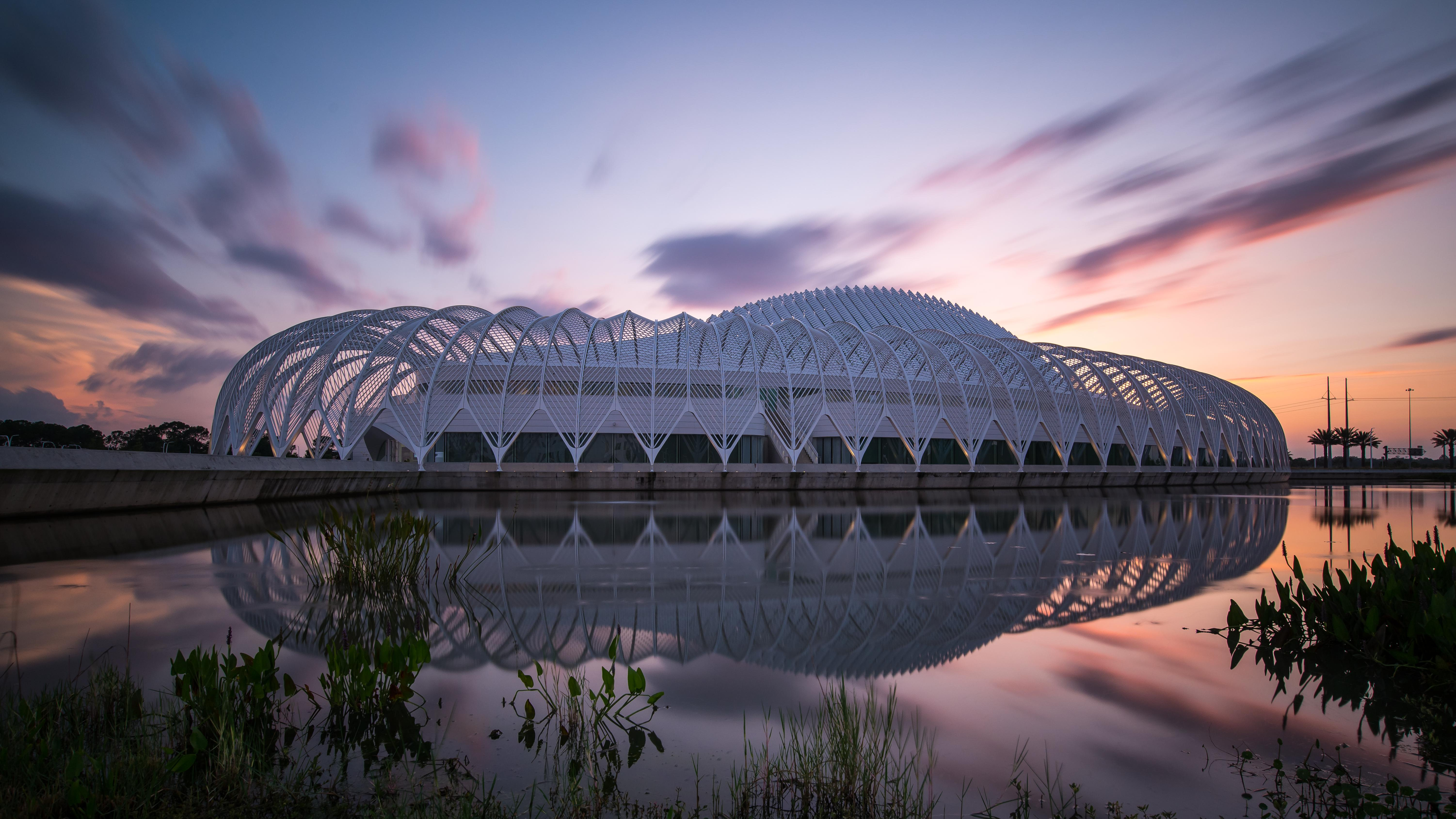
Florida Polytechnic University

The State University System of Florida comprises twelve member universities.

- Florida A&M University (Tallahassee)
- Florida Atlantic University (Boca Raton)
- Florida Gulf Coast University (Fort Myers)
- Florida International University (Miami)
- Florida Polytechnic University (Lakeland)
- Florida State University (Tallahassee)
- New College of Florida (Sarasota)
- University of Central Florida (Orlando)
- University of Florida (Gainesville)
- University of North Florida (Jacksonville)
- University of South Florida (Tampa)
- University of West Florida (Pensacola)

=== Florida College System ===
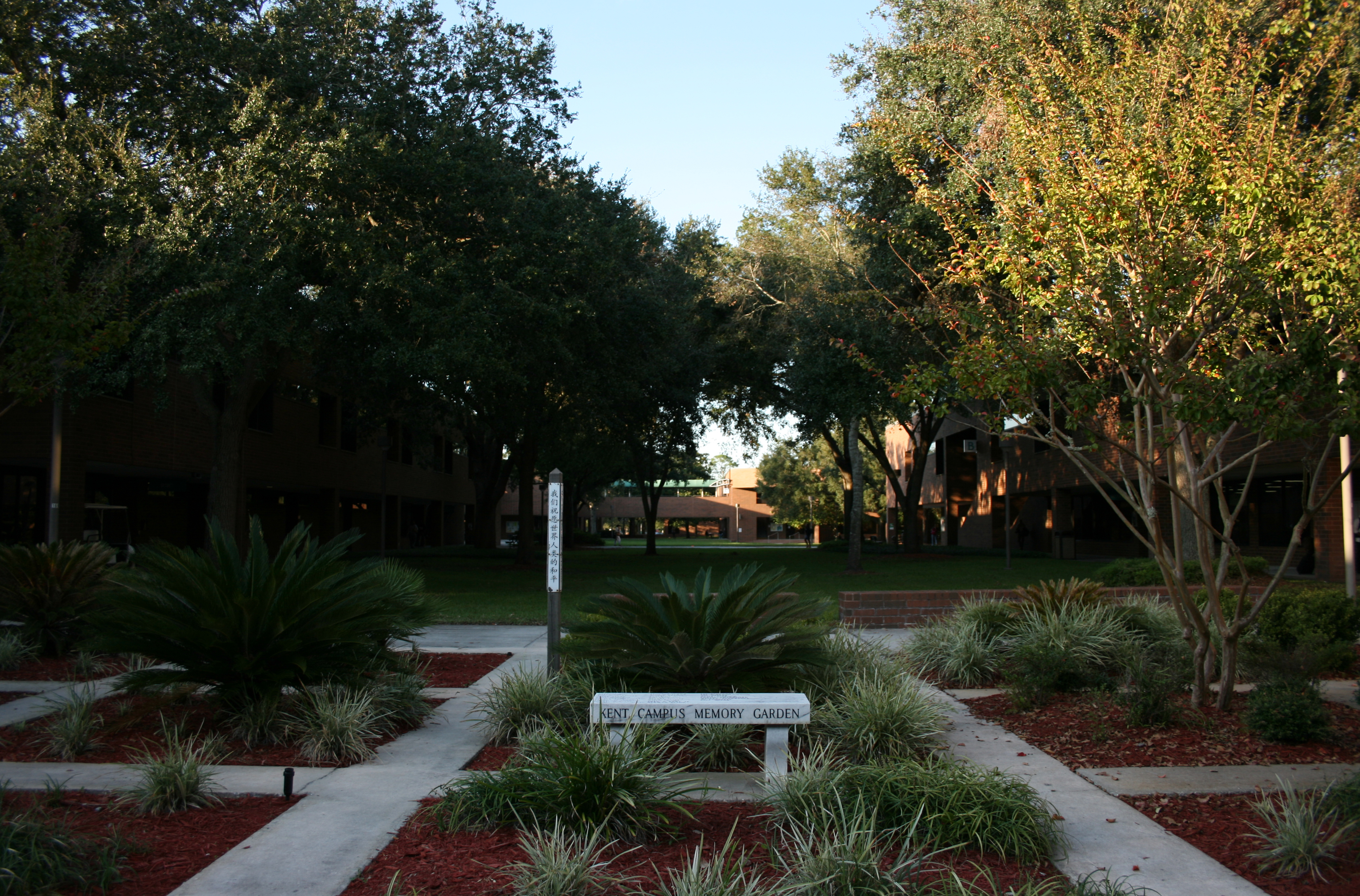
Florida State College at Jacksonville

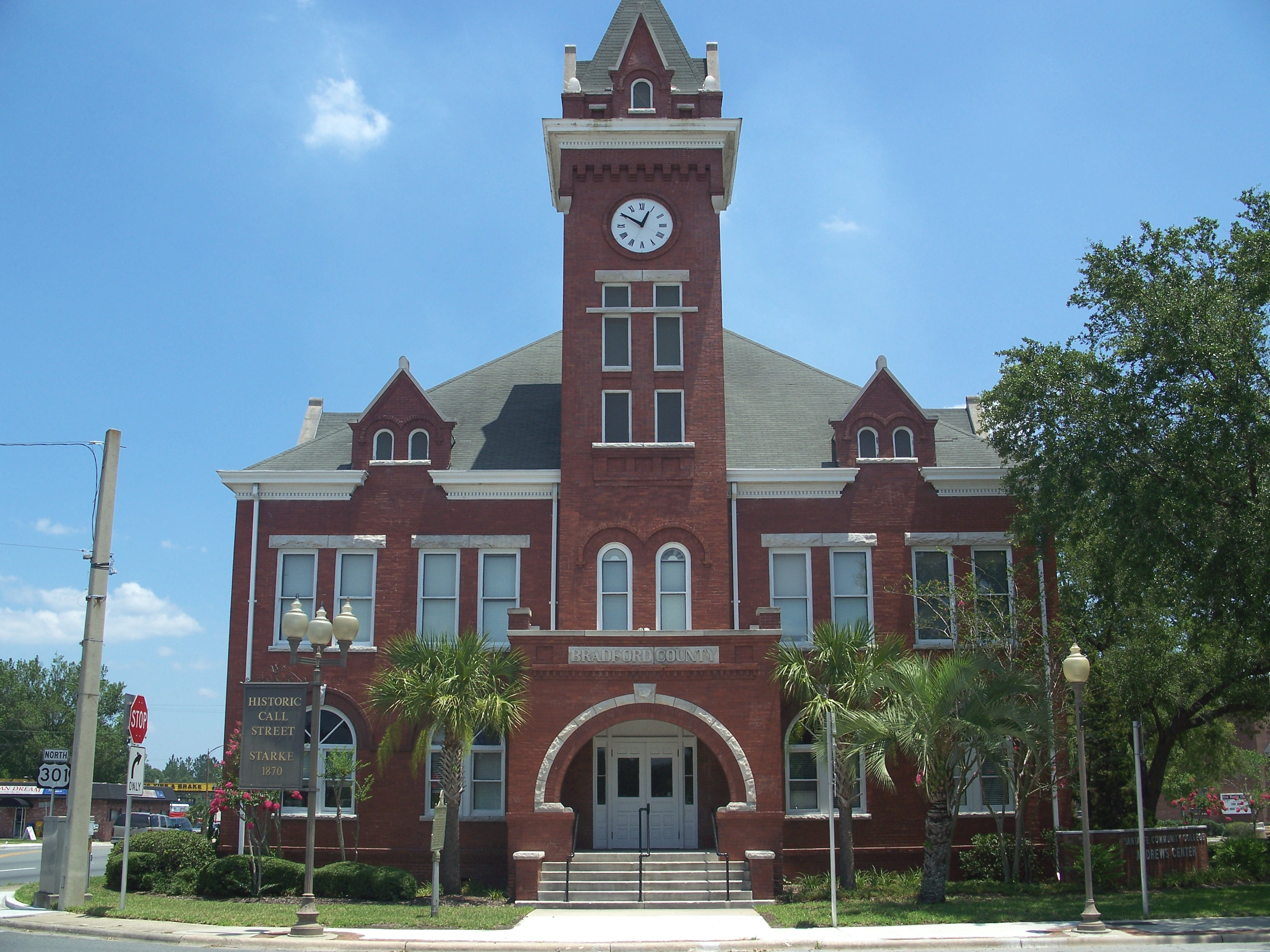
Santa Fe College

The Florida College System comprises twenty-eight community colleges and state colleges.

- Broward College (Davie)
- Chipola College (Marianna)
- College of Central Florida (Ocala)
- Daytona State College (Daytona Beach)
- Eastern Florida State College (Cocoa)
- Florida Gateway College (Lake City)
- College of the Florida Keys (Key West)
- Florida SouthWestern State College (Fort Myers)
- Florida State College at Jacksonville (Jacksonville)
- Gulf Coast State College (Panama City)
- Hillsborough Community College (Tampa)
- Indian River State College (Fort Pierce)
- Lake–Sumter State College (Leesburg)
- Miami Dade College (Miami)
- North Florida College (Madison)
- Northwest Florida State College (Niceville)
- Palm Beach State College (Lake Worth)
- Pasco–Hernando State College (New Port Richey)
- Pensacola State College (Pensacola)
- Polk State College (Winter Haven)
- Santa Fe College (Gainesville)
- Seminole State College of Florida (Sanford)
- South Florida State College (Avon Park)
- St. Johns River State College (Palatka)
- St. Petersburg College (St. Petersburg)
- State College of Florida, Manatee–Sarasota (Bradenton)
- Tallahassee State College (Tallahassee)
- Valencia College (Orlando)

=== Other public institutions ===
- George Stone Technical Center (Pensacola)

== Private colleges and universities ==
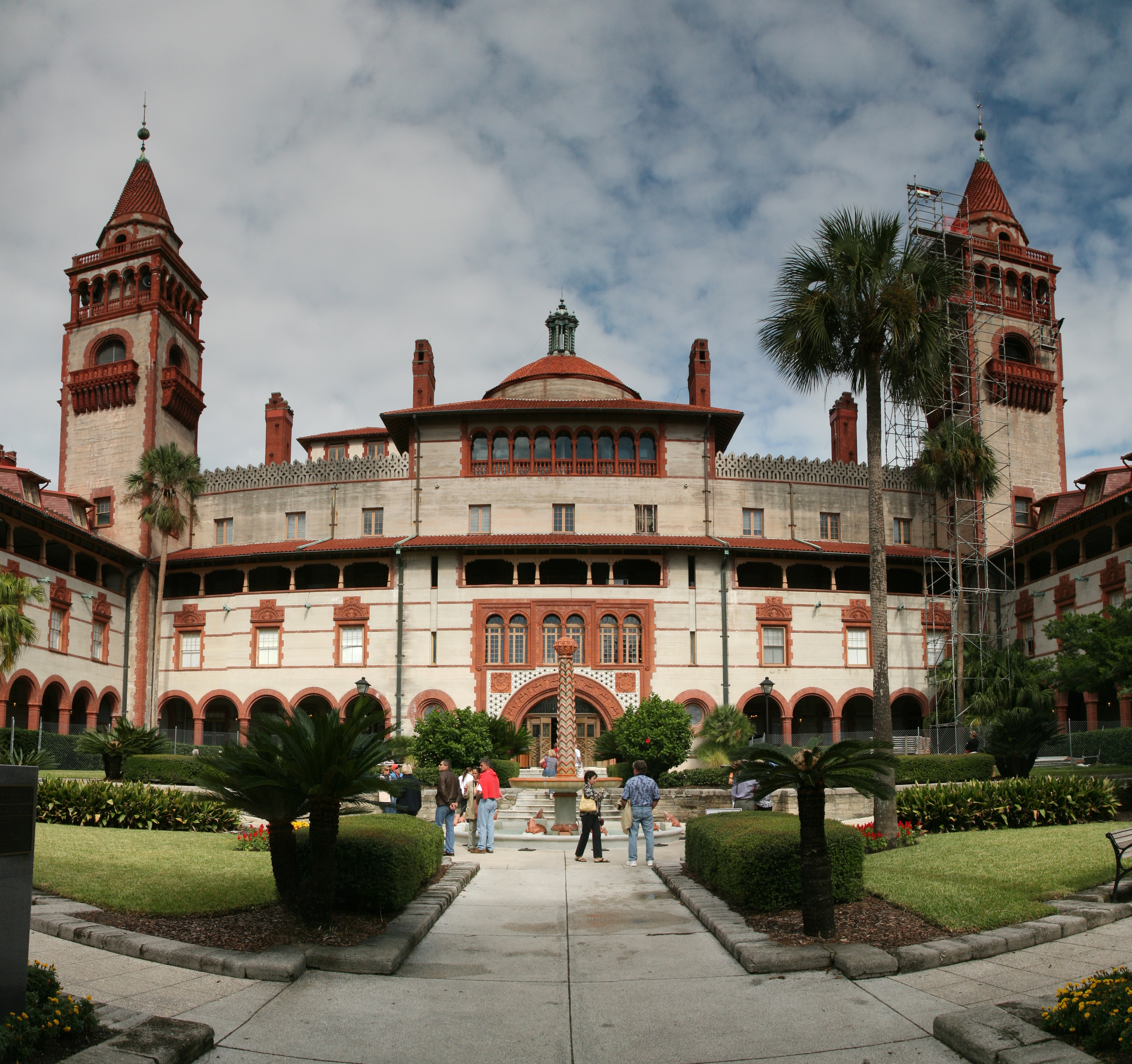
Flagler College

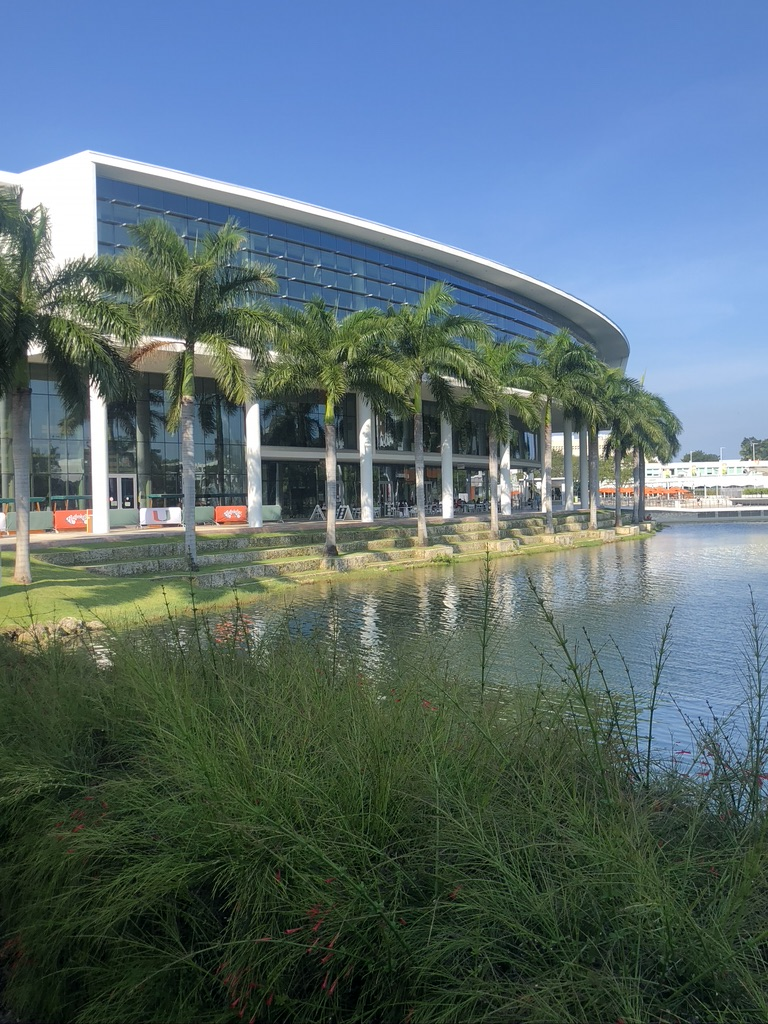
University of Miami

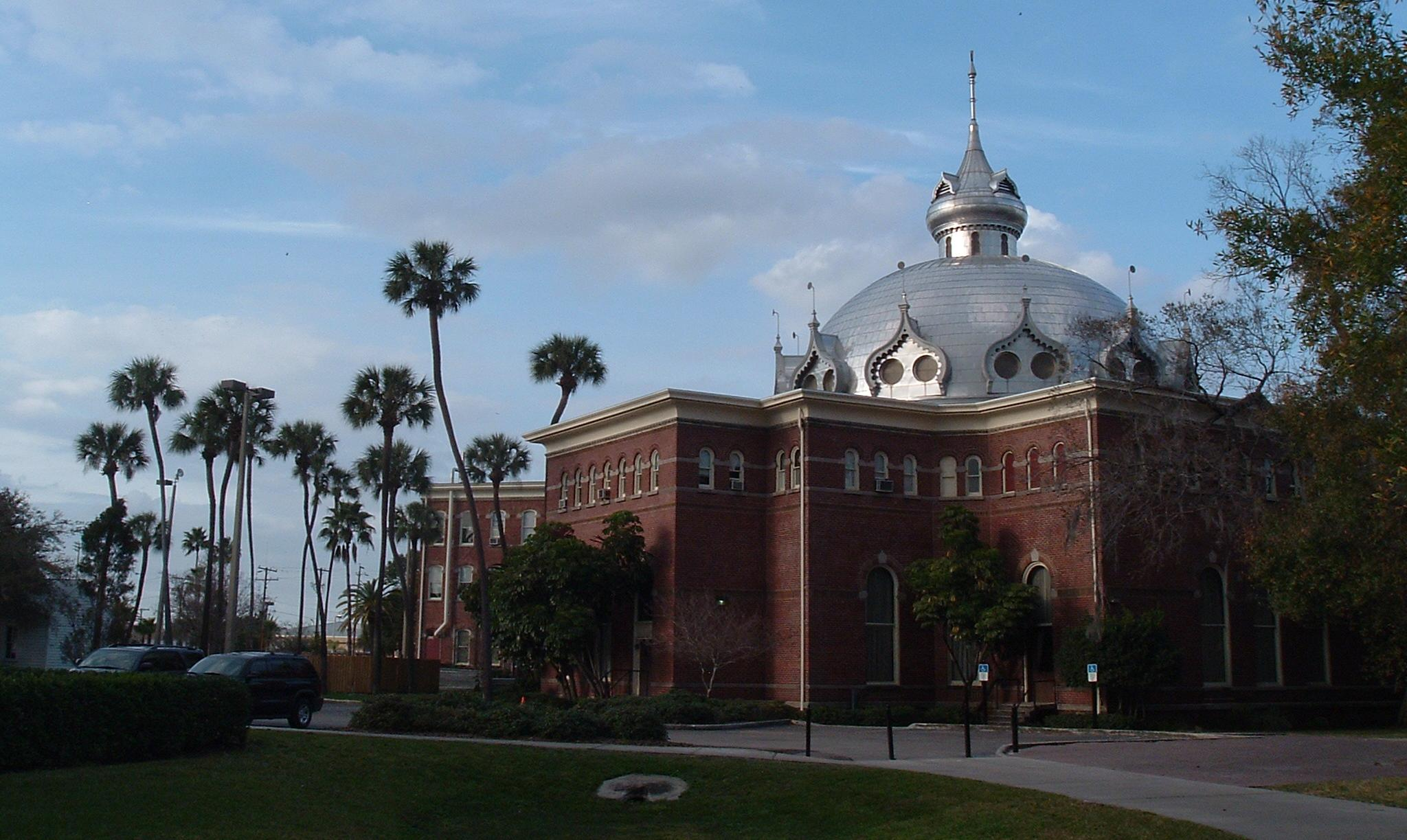
University of Tampa

=== Private institutions ===
- Academy for Five Element Acupuncture (Gainesville)
- Academy for Nursing and Health Occupations (West Palm Beach)
- Albizu University (Miami)
- Ana G. Méndez University (Orlando)
- Atlantic Institute of Oriental Medicine (Fort Lauderdale)
- Atlantis University (Miami-Dade County)
- Beacon College (Leesburg)
- Columbia College (Jacksonville)
- DeVry University (Orlando)
- Doral College (Doral)
- Dragon Rises College of Oriental Medicine (Bradenton)
- Embry–Riddle Aeronautical University (Daytona Beach)
- Flagler College (St. Augustine)
- Florida College of Integrative Medicine (Orlando)
- Florida Institute of Technology (Melbourne)
- Florida National University (Hialeah)
- Herzing University (Orlando and Tampa)
- Jacksonville University (Jacksonville)
- Keiser University (Fort Lauderdale)
- Lake Erie College of Osteopathic Medicine (Bradenton)
- Lynn University (Boca Raton)
- Miami Regional University (Miami Springs)
- Millennia Atlantic University (Doral)
- National Louis University (Tampa)
- Nova Southeastern University (Davie)
- Polytechnic University of Puerto Rico (Miami and Orlando)
- Rasmussen University (Ocala, Fort Myers, Odessa/Central Pasco, Altamonte Springs/North Orlando, and Tampa/Brandon)
- Ringling College of Art and Design (Sarasota)
- Rollins College (Winter Park)
- San Ignacio University
- Schiller International University (Tampa)
- South University (Royal Palm Beach and Tampa)
- Southeastern College (West Palm Beach)
- Southern Technical College (Fort Myers and Orlando)
- Springfield College (Tampa)
- Stetson University (DeLand)
- Strayer University (Tampa)
- United International College (Dania Beach)
- University of Miami (Coral Gables)
- University of St. Augustine for Health Sciences (St. Augustine)
- University of Tampa (Tampa)
- URBE University (Sweetwater)
- Webber International University (Babson Park)
- Western Michigan University Cooley Law School (Tampa)

=== Religiously affiliated institutions ===
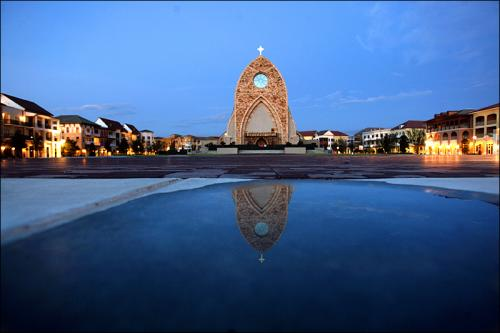
Ave Maria University

Eckerd College

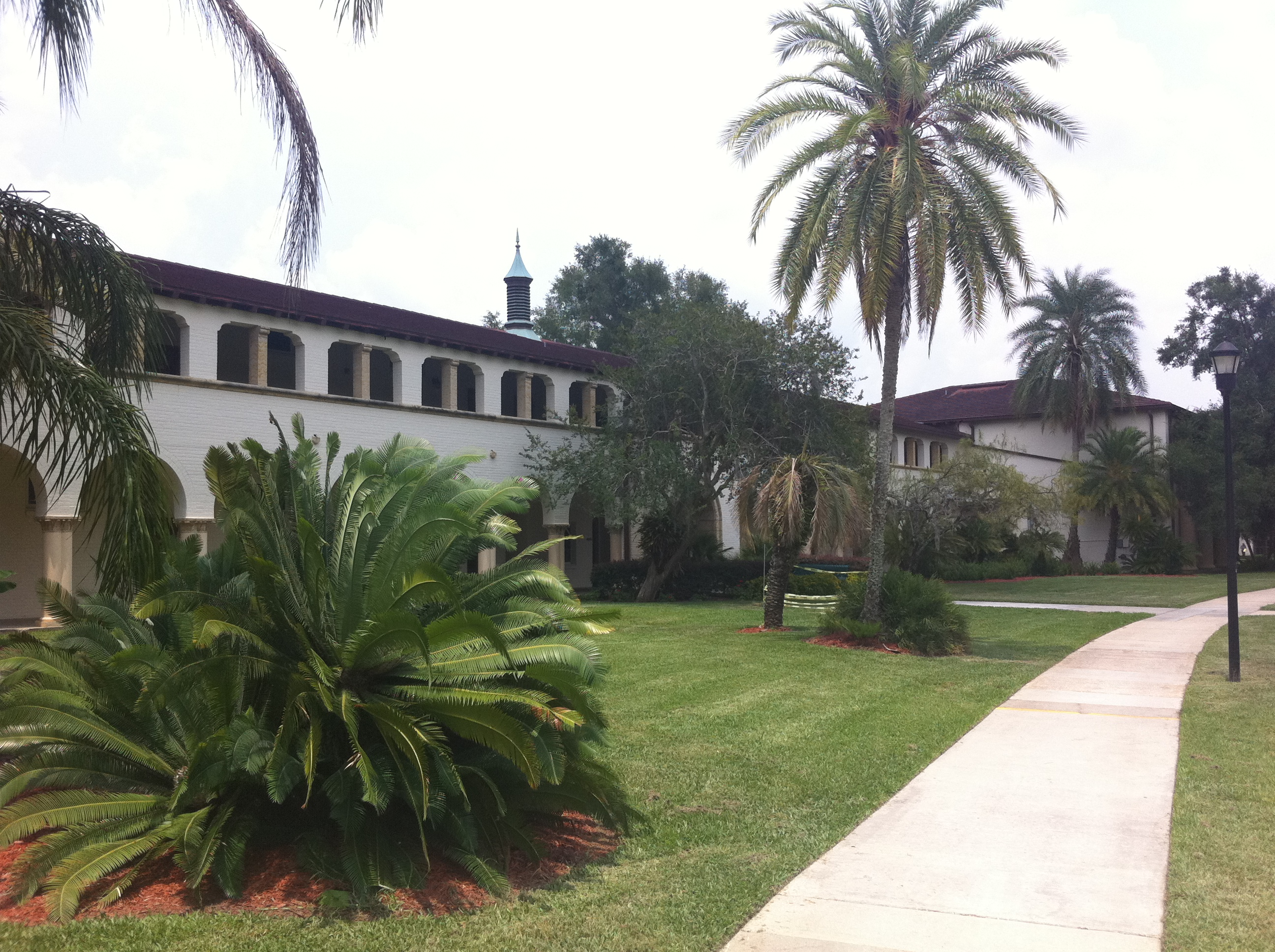
Saint Leo University

- AdventHealth University (Orlando)
- Ave Maria School of Law (Naples)
- Ave Maria University (Ave Maria)
- Baptist University of Florida (Graceville)
- Barry University (Miami Shores)
- Bethune–Cookman University (Daytona Beach)
- Eckerd College (St. Petersburg)
- Edward Waters University (Jacksonville)
- Emmaus Baptist College (Brandon)
- Faith Theological Seminary and Christian College (Tampa)
- Florida College (Temple Terrace)
- Florida Memorial University (Miami Gardens)
- Florida Southern College (Lakeland)
- Gordon–Conwell Theological Seminary (Jacksonville)
- Hobe Sound Bible College (Hobe Sound)
- Kennedy University of Baptist (Miami)
- Palm Beach Atlantic University (West Palm Beach)
- Pensacola Christian College (Pensacola)
- Reformed Theological Seminary (Orlando)
- Saint Leo University (St. Leo)
- Saint Vincent de Paul Regional Seminary (Boynton Beach)
- South Florida Bible College & Theological Seminary (Deerfield Beach)
- Southeastern University (Lakeland)
- St. John Vianney College Seminary (Miami)
- St. Thomas University (Miami Gardens)
- Talmudic University (Miami Beach)
- Trinity College of Jacksonville (Jacksonville)
- Trinity College of Florida (New Port Richey)
- University of Fort Lauderdale (Lauderhill)
- Warner University (Lake Wales)

=== Trade/technical institutions ===
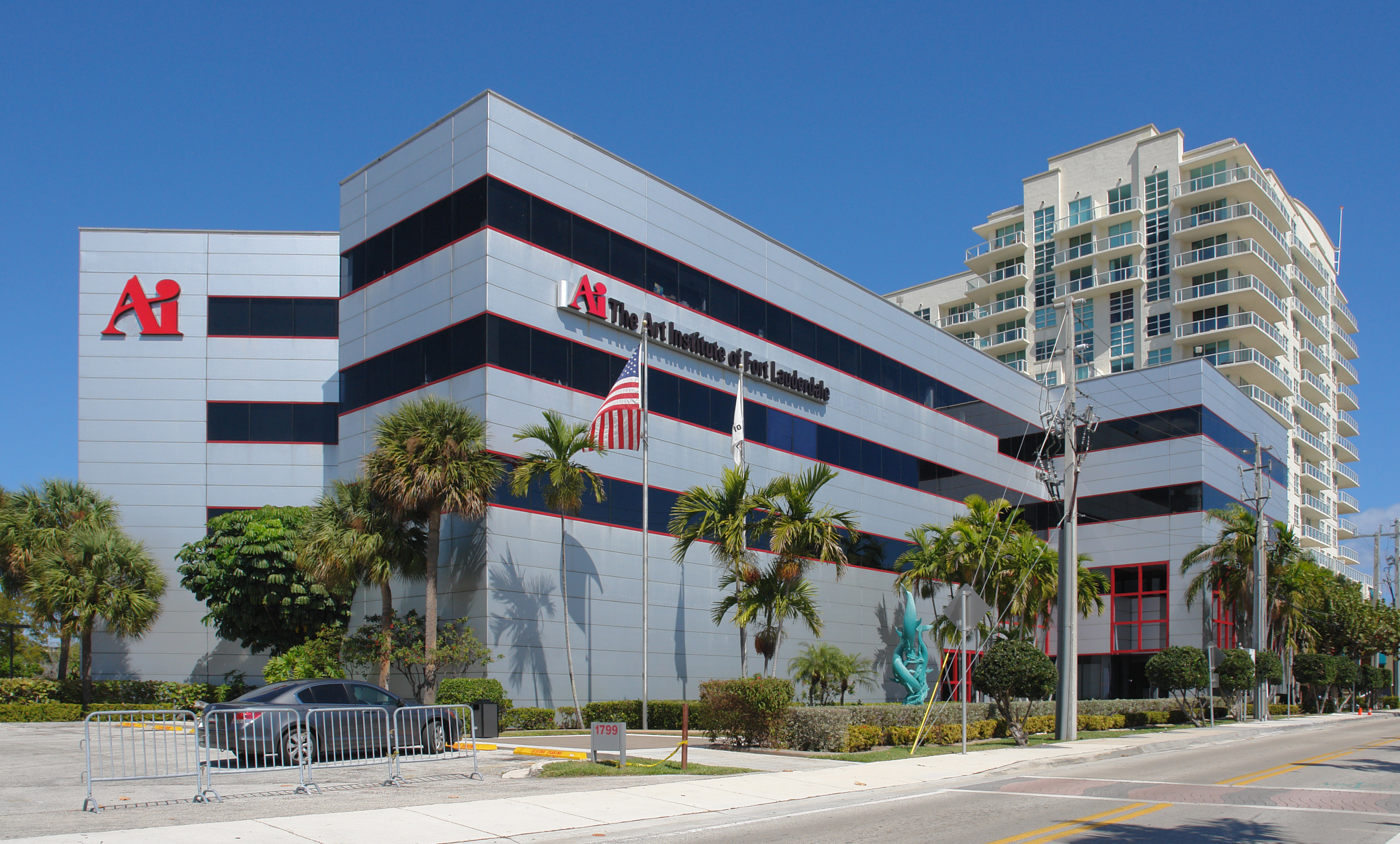
The Art Institute of Fort Lauderdale

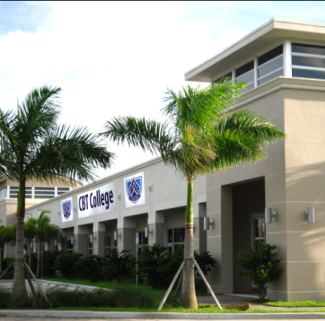
CBT Technology Institute- West Kendall Campus

- Advance Science International College (Miami Lakes)
- American Medical Academy (Miami)
- Antigua College International (Miami Lakes)
- Arizona College of Nursing (Fort Lauderdale, Sarasota, and Tampa)
- ATA Career Education (Spring Hill)
- Cambridge College of Healthcare & Technology (Altamonte Springs and Delray Beach)
- CBT Technology Institute (Cutler Bay, Hialeah, and Miami)
- Chamberlain University (Jacksonville)
- Chancellor Institute (Fort Lauderdale)
- Compu-Med Vocational Careers Corp (Hialeah)
- Concorde Career Institute (Jacksonville, Miramar, Orlando, and Tampa)
- Daytona College (Ormond Beach)
- Everglades University (Boca Raton)
- Florida Academy of Nursing (Miramar)
- Florida Education Institute (Miami)
- Fortis College (Cutler Bay, Orange Park, Pensacola, and Port Saint Lucie)
- Full Sail University (Winter Park)
- FVI School of Nursing and Technology (Miami)
- Galen College of Nursing (Gainesville, Pembroke Pines, Saint Petersburg, and Sarasota)
- Gwinnett Institute (Orlando)
- HCI College (West Palm Beach)
- Hope College of Arts and Sciences (Pompano Beach)
- Jersey College (Tampa, Jacksonville, and Fort Lauderdale)
- Jones Technical Institute (Jacksonville)
- Jose Maria Vargas University (Pembroke Pines)
- Mariano Moreno Culinary Institute (Miami)
- Med College (Hialeah)
- Meridian College (Sarasota)
- Miami Media School (Doral)
- New Professions Technical Institute (Miami)
- Premiere International College (Fort Myers)
- SABER College (Miami)
- Southern Technical College (Orlando)
- Taylor College (Ocala)
- Ultimate Medical Academy (Clearwater)
- Ultrasound Medical Institute (Royal Palm Beach)
- Universal Technical Institute (Miramar and Orlando)

== Former colleges and universities ==
- Acupuncture and Massage College (Miami) (closed 2024)
- Argosy University (Tampa) (closed 2019)
- The Art Institute of Fort Lauderdale (closed 2018)
- The Art Institute of Jacksonville (closed 2015)
- Art Institute of Tampa (closed 2023)
- Aviator College of Aeronautical Science and Technology (Fort Pierce) (closed 2026)
- City College (Hollywood and Orlando) (closed 2024)
- Clearwater Christian College (closed 2015)
- Digital Media Arts College (Boca Raton) (closed 2017; acquired by Lynn University)
- East West College of Natural Medicine (Sarasota) (closed 2025)
- Everest University (Pompano Beach)
- Florida Career College (Miami) (closed 2024)
- Hodges University (Fort Myers) (closed 2024)
- Johnson & Wales University - North Miami (closed 2021)
- Johnson University Florida (closed 2024)
- Jones College (closed 2017)
- Miami International University of Art and Design (closed 2023)
- Okan International University (Dania Beach) (closed 2019)
- Orlando Culinary Academy (Orlando) (closed 2017)
- Virginia College (closed 2018)

=== Segregated (defunct) junior colleges ===
Prior to 1968, racially integrated education was prohibited by the Florida Constitution of 1885. In an effort to show that the state of Florida had a separate but equal college system for black people, counties, with state support, established 11 junior colleges for black people; only one already existed (Booker T. Washington). In several cases a new junior college for whites was founded at approximately the same time. The 11 new junior colleges were opened in the late 1950s and early 1960s. They were abruptly closed following passage of the Civil Rights Act of 1964.

- Booker T. Washington Junior College
- Gibbs Junior College
- Roosevelt Junior College
- Carver Junior College
- Jackson Junior College
- Hampton Junior College
- Rosenwald Junior College
- Suwannee River Junior College
- Volusia County Junior College
- Collier-Blocker Junior College
- Lincoln Junior College
- Johnson Junior College

== See also ==
- List of college athletic programs in Florida
- Education in Florida
- Florida Board of Governors
- Florida Department of Education
- List of American institutions of higher education
- List of colleges and universities in metropolitan Jacksonville
