= Historically black colleges and universities =

Schools once meant for African Americans

Historically black colleges and universities (HBCUs) are institutions of higher education in the United States that were established before the enactment of the Civil Rights Act of 1964 with the intention of serving African American students. Most are in the Southern United States and were founded during the Reconstruction era (1865–1877) following the American Civil War. Their original purpose was to provide education for African Americans in an era when most colleges and universities in the United States did not allow black students to enroll.

During the Reconstruction era, most historically Black colleges were founded by Protestant religious organizations. This changed in 1890 with the 51st United States Congress' enactment of the Second Morrill Act, which required segregated Southern states to provide African Americans with public higher education schools in order to receive the Act's benefits. Separately, during the late 20th century, either after expanding their inclusion of Black people and African Americans into their institutions or gaining the status of minority-serving institution, some institutions came to be called predominantly black institutions (PBIs).

For a century after the abolition of American slavery in 1865, almost all colleges and universities in the Southern United States prohibited all African Americans from attending as required by Jim Crow laws in the South, while institutions in other parts of the country regularly employed quotas to limit admission of Black people. HBCUs were established to provide more opportunities to African Americans and are largely responsible for establishing and expanding the African-American middle class. In the 1950s and 1960s, legally enforced racial segregation in education was generally outlawed throughout the South (and anywhere else in the United States), and other non-discrimination policies were adopted.

There are 107 HBCUs as of 2026 in the United States (of 121 institutions that existed during the 1930s), representing three percent (3%) of the nation's colleges, including public and private institutions. 27 offer doctoral programs, 52 offer master's programs, 83 offer bachelor's degree programs, and 38 offer associate degrees. HBCUs currently produce nearly 20% of all African American college graduates and 25% of African American STEM graduates. Among the graduates of HBCUs are civil rights leader Martin Luther King Jr., United States Supreme Court justice Thurgood Marshall, American film director Spike Lee, former United States vice president Kamala Harris and the late American mathematician Katherine Johnson.

== History ==
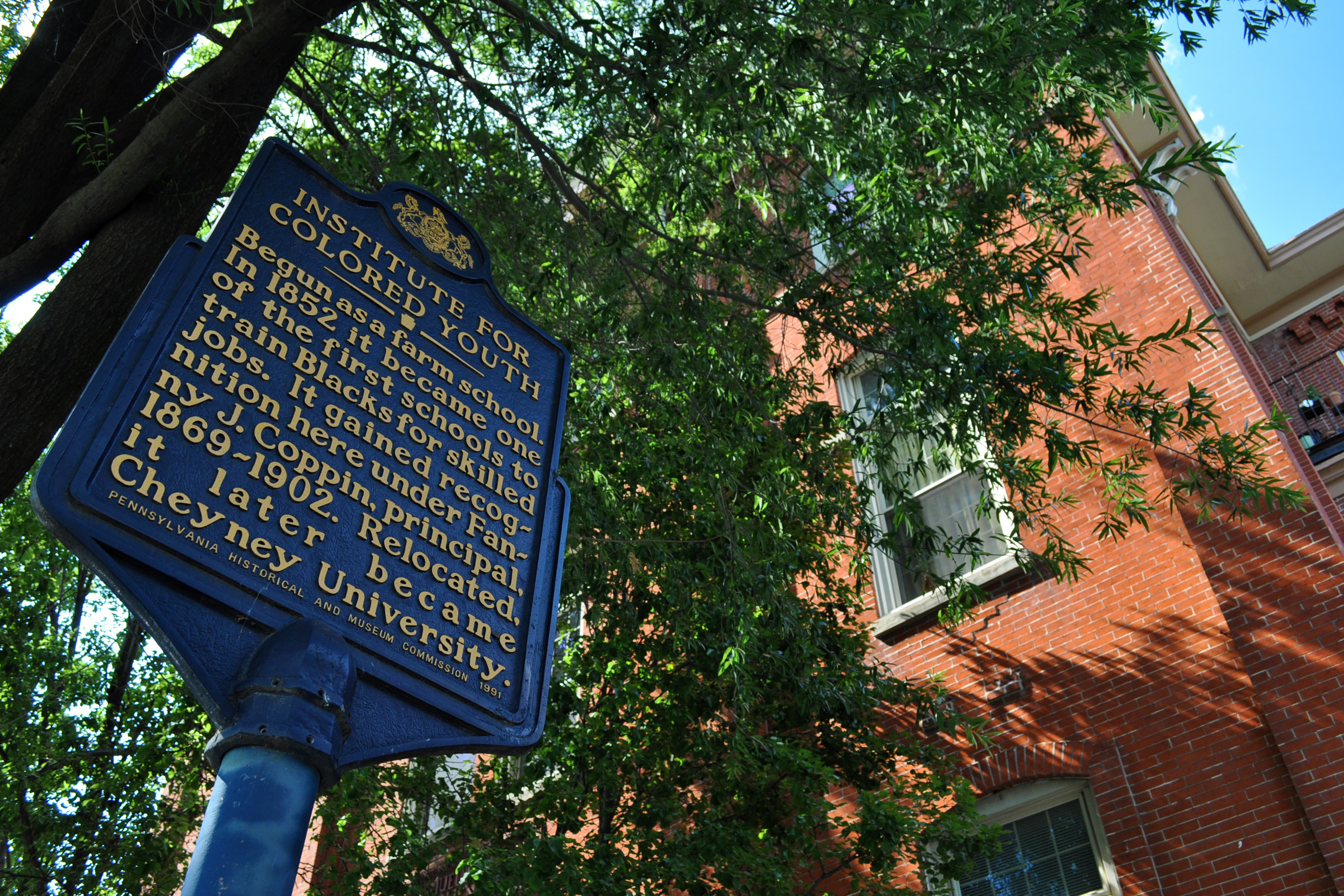
Cheyney University of Pennsylvania was founded in 1837 as the Institute for Colored Youth, making it the oldest HBCU in the nation.

=== Medical schools ===
Following the release of the Flexner Report, "five of the seven Black medical schools in the United States were forced to close, leaving only Howard and Meharry."

=== Private institutions ===
HBCUs established prior to the American Civil War include Cheyney University of Pennsylvania in 1837, Avery College in 1849, University of the District of Columbia (then known as Miner School for Colored Girls) in 1851, Lincoln University PA in 1854, and Wilberforce University in 1856.

HBCUs were controversial in their early years. At the 1847 National Convention of Colored People and Their Friends, the famed Black orators Frederick Douglass, Henry Highland Garnet, and Alexander Crummell debated the need for such institutions, with Crummell arguing that HBCUs were necessary to provide freedom from discrimination, and Douglass and Garnet arguing that self-segregation would harm the Black community. A majority of the convention voted that HBCUs should be supported.

Most HBCUs were established in the South after the American Civil War, often with the assistance of religious missionary organizations based in the North, especially the American Missionary Association. The Freedmen's Bureau played a major role in financing the new schools.

Atlanta University – now Clark Atlanta University – was founded on September 19, 1865, as the first HBCU in the Southern United States. Atlanta University was the first graduate institution to award degrees to African Americans in the nation and the first to award bachelor's degrees to African Americans in the South; Clark College (1869) was the nation's first four-year liberal arts college to serve African-American students. The two consolidated in 1988 to form Clark Atlanta University. Shaw University, founded December 1, 1865, was the second HBCU to be established in the South. The year 1865 also saw the foundation of Storer College (1865–1955) in Harper's Ferry, West Virginia. Storer's former campus and buildings have since been incorporated into Harpers Ferry National Historical Park.

Some of these universities eventually became public universities with assistance from the government.

=== Public institutions ===
In 1862, the federal government's Morrill Act provided for land grant colleges in each state. Educational institutions established under the Morrill Act in the North and West were open to Black Americans. But 17 states, almost all in the South, required their post-Civil war systems to be segregated and excluded Black students from their land grant colleges. In the 1870s, Mississippi, Virginia, and South Carolina each assigned one African American college land-grant status: Alcorn University, Hampton Institute, and Claflin University, respectively. In response, Congress passed the second Morrill Act of 1890, also known as the Agricultural College Act of 1890, requiring states to establish a separate land grant college for Black students if they were being excluded from the existing land grant college. Many of the HBCUs were founded by states to satisfy the Second Morrill Act. These land grant schools continue to receive annual federal funding for their research, extension, and outreach activities.

=== Predominantly Black Institution ===
Predominantly Black Institution (PBI) is a distinct U.S. Department of Education classification under the Minority Serving Institution category. There is a strict, codified definition for eligibility of PBI classification, including having an enrollment of undergraduate students that is at least 40% Black American students and a population of undergraduate students of which not less than 50% of the undergraduate students enrolled at the institution are low-income individuals or first-generation college students. While PBIs are, by definition, not HBCUs, these institutions share a common affinities like Divine Nine organizations and membership in associations like the United Negro College Fund.

=== Sports ===
In the 1920s and 1930s, historically Black colleges developed a strong interest in athletics. Sports were expanding rapidly at state universities, but very few Black stars were recruited there. Race newspapers hailed athletic success as a demonstration of racial progress. Black schools hired coaches, recruited and featured stellar athletes, and set up their own leagues.

=== Jewish refugees ===
In the 1930s, many Jewish intellectuals fleeing Europe after the rise of Hitler and anti-Jewish legislation in prewar Nazi Germany following Hitler's elevation to power emigrated to the United States and found work teaching in historically Black colleges. In particular, 1933 was a challenging year for many Jewish academics who tried to escape increasingly oppressive Nazi policies, particularly after legislation was passed stripping them of their positions at universities. Jews looking outside of Germany could not find work in other European countries because of calamities like the Spanish Civil War and general antisemitism in Europe. In the US, they hoped to continue their academic careers, but barring a scant few (see Jewish quota in U.S. institutions), found little acceptance in elite institutions in Depression-era America, which also had their own undercurrent of antisemitism.

As a result of these phenomena, more than two-thirds of the faculty hired at many HBCUs from 1933 to 1945 had come to the United States to escape from Nazi Germany. HBCUs believed the Jewish professors were valuable faculty that would help strengthen their institutions' credibility. HBCUs had a firm belief in diversity and giving opportunity no matter the race, religion, or country of origin. HBCUs were open to Jews because of their ideas of equal learning spaces. They sought to create an environment where all people felt welcome to study, including women.

=== World War II ===
HBCUs made substantial contributions to the US war effort. One example is Tuskegee University in Alabama, where the Tuskegee Airmen trained and attended classes.

=== Florida's Black junior colleges ===
After the landmark Brown v. Board of Education decision of 1954, the legislature of Florida, with support from various counties, opened eleven junior colleges serving the African American population. Their purpose was to show that separate but equal education was working in Florida. Prior to this, there had been only one junior college in Florida serving African Americans, Booker T. Washington Junior College, in Pensacola, founded in 1949. The new ones were Gibbs Junior College (1957), Roosevelt Junior College (1958), Volusia County Junior College (1958), Hampton Junior College (1958), Rosenwald Junior College (1958), Suwannee River Junior College (1959), Carver Junior College (1960), Collier-Blocker Junior College (1960), Lincoln Junior College (1960), Jackson Junior College (1961), and Johnson Junior College (1962).

The new junior colleges began as extensions of Black high schools. They used the same facilities and often the same faculty. Some built their own buildings after a few years. After the passage of the Civil Rights Act of 1964 mandated an end to school segregation, the colleges were all abruptly closed. Only a fraction of the students and faculty were able to transfer to the previously all-white junior colleges, where they found, at best, an indifferent reception.

=== Since 1965 ===
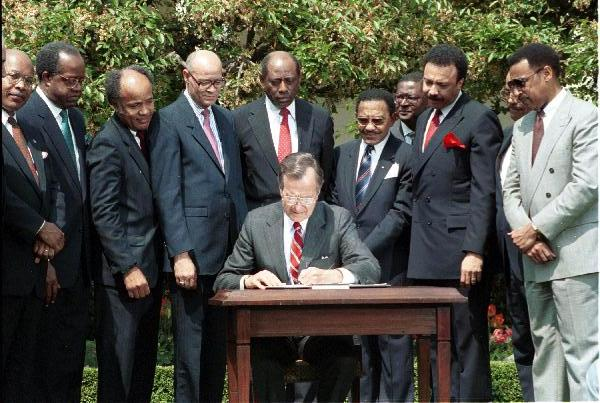
President George H. W. Bush signs a new Executive Order on historically Black colleges and universities in the White House Rose Garden, April 1989.

A reauthorization of the Higher Education Act of 1965 established a program for direct federal grants to HBCUs, to support their academic, financial, and administrative capabilities. Part B specifically provides for formula-based grants, calculated based on each institution's Pell grant eligible enrollment, graduation rate, and percentage of graduates who continue post-baccalaureate education in fields where African Americans are underrepresented. Some colleges with a predominantly Black student body are not classified as HBCUs because they were founded (or opened their doors to African Americans) after the implementation of the Sweatt v. Painter (1950) and Brown v. Board of Education (1954) rulings by the U.S. Supreme Court (the court decisions which outlawed racial segregation of public education facilities) and the Higher Education Act of 1965.

In 1980, Jimmy Carter signed an executive order to distribute adequate resources and funds to strengthen the nation's public and private HBCUs. His executive order created the White House Initiative on historically Black colleges and universities (WHIHBCU), which is a federally funded program that operates within the U.S. Department of Education. In 1989, George H. W. Bush continued Carter's pioneering spirit by signing Executive Order 12677, which created the presidential advisory board on HBCUs, to counsel the government and the secretary on the future development of these organizations.

Starting in 2001, directors of libraries of several HBCUs began discussions about ways to pool their resources and work collaboratively. In 2003, this partnership was formalized as the HBCU Library Alliance, "a consortium that supports the collaboration of information professionals dedicated to providing an array of resources designed to strengthen historically Black colleges and Universities and their constituents."

In 2015, the Bipartisan Congressional Historically Black Colleges and Universities (HBCU) Caucus was established by U.S. Representatives Alma S. Adams and Bradley Byrne. The caucus advocates for HBCUs on Capitol Hill. As of May 2022, there are over 100 elected politicians who are members of the caucus.

== Current status ==
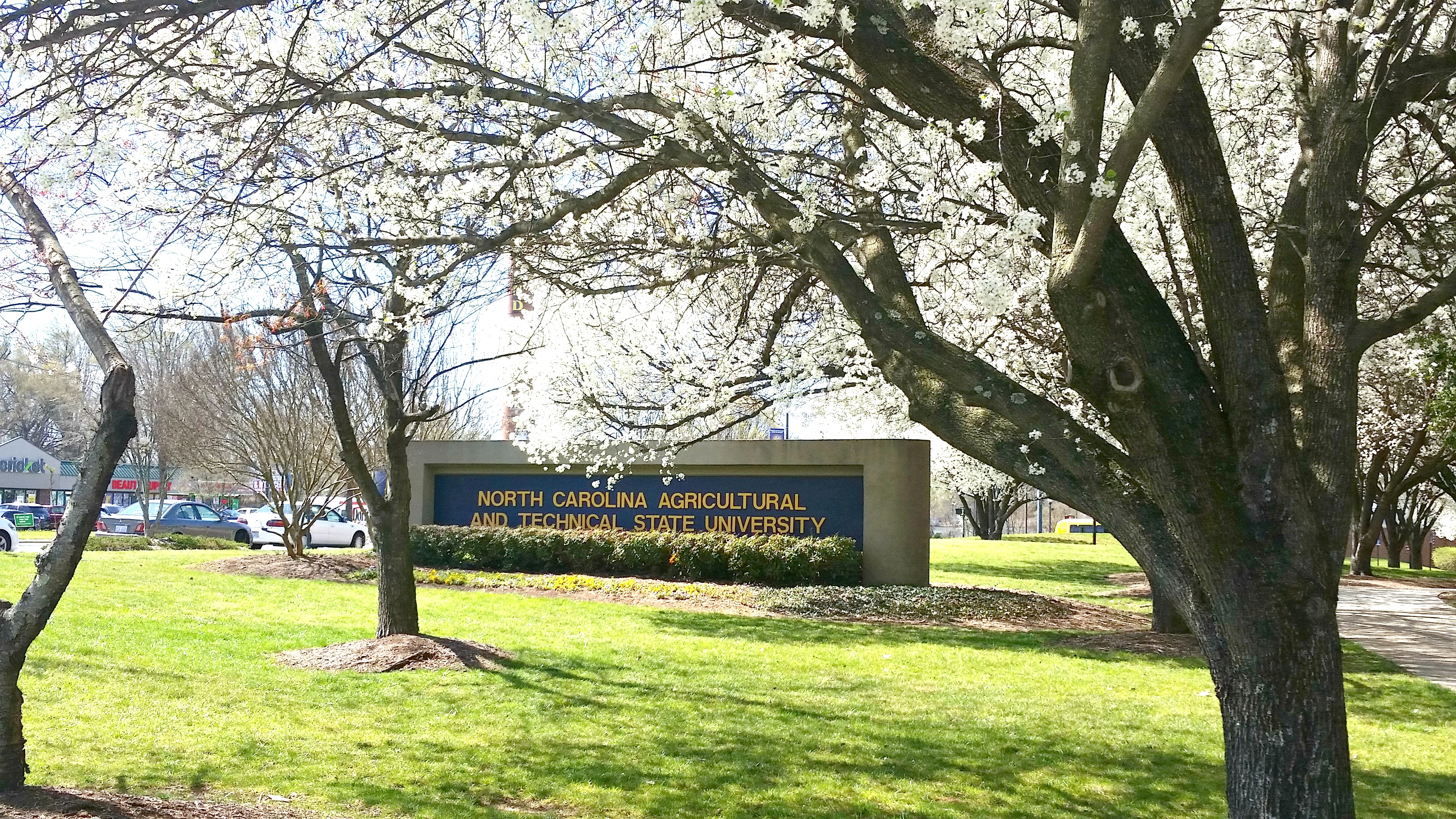
North Carolina A&T State University is the nation's largest HBCU by enrollment.

Each year, the U.S. Department of Education designates a week in the fall as "National HBCU Week." This week features conferences and events focused on discussing and celebrating HBCUs while also honoring notable scholars and alumni from these institutions.

In September 2025, North Carolina A&T State University became the first HBCU to ever enroll more than 15,000 students.

As of February 2025, Alabama has the most active HBCUs of any state, with 14. North Carolina is second with 11.

In February 2025, Howard University became the first HBCU to achieve Research One (R1) Carnegie Classification.

In 2024, some HBCUs experienced a significant increase in applications and enrollment, largely driven by the Supreme Court's landmark decision in June 2023 to end race-based affirmative action at American colleges and universities.

A 2024 study by the American Institute for Boys and Men revealed that Black men make up only 26% of HBCU students, down from 38% in 1976. The decline of Black men enrolled in college is also noticeable at non-HBCUs.

In 2024, the United Negro College Fund (UNCF) released a study showing that HBCUs had a $16.5 billion positive impact on the nation's economy.

In 2023, the average HBCU 6-year undergraduate graduation rate was 35% while the national average was 64%. Spelman College was the only HBCU above the national average at 74%. Also in 2023, 73% of students attending HBCUs were Pell Grant eligible while the national average was 34%. Talladega College had the highest percent of Pell Grant eligible students among HBCUs at 95%.

Between 2020 and 2026, philanthropist MacKenzie Scott donated a historic over $1 billion in total to 24 public and private HBCUs, with all of her contributions setting donation records at the institutions she supported. Scott also donated $70 million to the UNCF which supports 37 private HBCUs.

In 2015, the share of Black students attending HBCUs had dropped to 9% of the total number of Black students enrolled in degree-granting institutions nationwide. This figure is a decline from the 13% of Black students who enrolled in an HBCU in 2000 and 17% who enrolled in 1980. This is a result of desegregation, rising incomes and increased access to financial aid, which has created more college options for Black students.

The percentages of bachelor's and master's degrees awarded to Black students by HBCUs has decreased over time. HBCUs awarded 35% of the bachelor's degrees and 21% of the master's degrees earned by Black students in 1976–77, compared with the 14% and 6% respectively of bachelor's and master's degrees earned by Black students in 2014–15. Additionally, the percentage of Black doctoral degree recipients who received their degrees from HBCUs was lower in 2014–15 (12%) than in 1976–77 (14%).

The number of total students enrolled at an HBCU rose by 32% between 1976 and 2015, from 223,000 to 293,000. Total enrollment in degree-granting institutions nationwide increased by 81%, from 11 million to 20 million, in the same period.

Although HBCUs were originally founded to educate Black students, their diversity has increased over time. In 2015, students who were either White, Hispanic, Asian or Pacific Islander, or Native American made up 22% of total enrollment at HBCUs, compared with 15% in 1976.

HBCUS may struggle to compete with predominantly White schools in recruiting high-achieving Black students. In an attempt to correct for racial disparities, many predominantly White institutions actively seek out and court high-achieving students of color. These schools may extend scholarships or other incentives to prospective students beyond what HBCUs can offer.

=== Racial diversity post-2000 ===
Following the enactment of Civil Rights laws in the 1960s, many educational institutions in the United States that receive federal funding adopted affirmative action to increase their racial diversity. Some historically Black colleges and universities now have non-Black majorities, including West Virginia State University and Bluefield State University, whose student bodies have had large White majorities since the mid-1960s.

As many HBCUs have made a concerted effort to maintain enrollment levels and often offer relatively affordable tuition, the percentage of non–African-American enrollment has risen. The following table highlights HBCUs with high non–African American enrollments:

Racial diversity at HBCUs, 2016–2017 school year
College name	State	Percentage	
College name	State	African American	Non-African American
Bluefield State University	West Virginia	8	92
West Virginia State University	West Virginia	8	92
Kentucky State University	Kentucky	46	54
University of the District of Columbia	District of Columbia	59	41
Delaware State University	Delaware	64	36
Fayetteville State University	North Carolina	60	40
Winston-Salem State University	North Carolina	71	29
Elizabeth City State University	North Carolina	76	24
Xavier University of Louisiana	Louisiana	70	30
North Carolina A&T State University	North Carolina	80	20
Lincoln University (Pennsylvania)	Pennsylvania	84	16

Other HBCUs with relatively high non–African American student populations

According to the U.S. News & World Report Best Colleges 2011 edition, the proportion of White American students at Langston University was 12%; at Shaw University, 12%; at Tennessee State University, 12%; at the University of Maryland Eastern Shore, 12%; and at North Carolina Central University, 10%. The U.S. News & World Report's statistical profiles indicate that several other HBCUs have relatively significant percentages of non–African American student populations consisting of Asian, Hispanic, White American, and foreign students.

=== Special academic programs ===
HBCU libraries have formed the HBCU Library Alliance. Together with Cornell University, the alliance has a joint program to digitize HBCU collections. The project is funded by the Andrew W. Mellon Foundation. Additionally, more historically Black colleges and universities are offering online education programs. As of November 23, 2010, nineteen historically Black colleges and universities offer online degree programs.

=== Intercollegiate sports ===
NCAA Division I has two historically Black athletic conferences: Mid-Eastern Athletic Conference and Southwestern Athletic Conference. The top football teams from the conferences have played each other in postseason bowl games: the Pelican Bowl (1970s), the Heritage Bowl (1990s), and the Celebration Bowl (2015–present). These conferences are home to all Division I HBCUs except for Hampton University and Tennessee State University. Tennessee State has been a member of the Ohio Valley Conference since 1986, while Hampton left the MEAC in 2018 for the Big South Conference. In 2021, North Carolina A&T State University made the same conference move that Hampton made three years earlier (MEAC to Big South). Both Hampton and North Carolina A&T later moved their athletic programs to the Colonial Athletic Association and its technically separate football league of CAA Football; Hampton joined both sides of the CAA in 2022, while A&T joined the all-sports CAA in 2022 before joining CAA Football in 2023.

The mostly HBCU Central Intercollegiate Athletic Association and Southern Intercollegiate Athletic Conference are part of the NCAA Division II, whereas the HBCU Gulf Coast Athletic Conference is part of the National Association of Intercollegiate Athletics.

== Notable HBCU alumni ==
HBCUs have a long legacy of matriculating many leaders in the fields of business, law, science, education, military service, entertainment, art, and sports.

- Ralph Abernathy, civil rights activist, minister – Clark Atlanta University, Alabama State University
- Ed Bradley, first Black White House correspondent for CBS News – Cheyney University of Pennsylvania
- Edward Brooke, first African-American elected by popular vote to United States Senate and to serve as Massachusetts Attorney General – Howard University
- Roscoe Lee Browne, prolific actor and director – Lincoln University
- Stokely Carmichael, political organizer, Black Power theorist and Pan-Africanist activist – Howard University
- James Clyburn, US Congressman from South Carolina's 6th congressional district and Majority Whip of the 116th United States Congress – South Carolina State University
- Medgar Wiley Evers, civil rights leader – Alcorn State University
- NASA mathematician Katherine Johnson attended West Virginia State University.
- Althea Gibson, the first African American to win a Grand Slam title had a full athletic scholarship to Florida A&M University
- Nikki Giovanni, poet – Fisk University
- Lonnie Johnson, inventor, NASA engineer – Tuskegee University
- Tom Joyner, first African-American inducted into the National Radio Hall of Fame – Tuskegee University
- Reginald Lewis, first African-American to build and own a billion dollar company – Virginia State
- Claude McKay, poet, Tuskegee University
- Astronaut Ronald McNair graduated from North Carolina A&T State University.
- Rod Paige, first African-American to serve as the U.S. education chief – Jackson State University
- Anika Noni Rose, the original voice of the first African American Disney princess (Tiana) – Florida A&M University
- Jerry Rice, record-holding NFL wide receiver – Mississippi Valley State
- Leon H. Sullivan, developer of the Sullivan Principles used to end apartheid in South Africa, attended West Virginia State University.
- André Leon Talley, first African-American editor-at-large of Vogue – Virginia State
- Alice Walker, novelist and poet – Spelman College
- Doug Williams, first Black NFL quarterback to win a Super Bowl – Grambling State
- Benjamin Hooks, civil rights leader and Executive Director of NAACP - Morehouse College
- Barbara Jordan, first Southern African-American woman elected to U.S. House of Representatives - Texas Southern University
- Kamala Harris, first female vice-president of the United States - Howard University

== Modern presidential and federal support ==
Federal funding for HBCUs has notably increased in recent years. Proper federal support of HBCUs has become more of a key issue in modern U.S. presidential elections.

In President Barack Obama's eight years in office, he invested more than $4 billion to HBCUs.

In 2019, President Donald Trump signed a bipartisan bill that permanently invested more than $250 million a year to HBCUs.

In 2021, President Joe Biden's first year in office, he invested a historic $5.8 billion to support HBCUs. In 2022, Biden's administration announced an additional $2.7 billion through his American Rescue Plan.

In 2025, President Donald Trump signed an executive order establishing the White House Initiative to Promote Excellence and Innovation at Historically Black Colleges and Universities (HBCUs). This initiative is housed within the Executive Office of the President and aims to enhance HBCUs' capacity to deliver a high-quality education. In September 2025, Trump granted nearly $500 million in federal support to HBCUs.

In September 2025, The Price of Excellence, a short documentary examining the historical underfunding of HBCUs relative to peer institutions, was produced by The Century Foundation with support from The Kresge Foundation. It was filmed at North Carolina Agricultural and Technical State University and premiered at the Congressional Black Caucus Foundation's Annual Legislative Conference on September 25, 2025.

== HBCU homecomings ==
Homecoming is a tradition at almost every American college and university, however homecoming has a more unique meaning at HBCUs. Homecoming plays a significant role in the culture and identity of HBCUs. The level of pageantry and local Black community involvement (parade participation, business vendors, etc.) helps make HBCU homecomings more distinctive. Due to higher campus traffic and activity, classes at HBCUs are usually cancelled on Friday and Saturday of homecoming. Millions of alumni, students, celebrity guests, and visitors attend HBCU homecomings every year. In addition to being a highly cherished tradition and festive week, homecomings generate strong revenue for many Black owned businesses and HBCUs. Since 2021, the rise in violence at HBCU homecomings—primarily gun-related and most often perpetrated by individuals unaffiliated with HBCUs—has become a significant concern.

== See also ==
- Black Ivy League
- Colleges in the United States
- History of education in the Southern United States
- HBCU band
- HBCU Library Alliance
- Honda Campus All-Star Challenge
- National Museum of African American History and Culture
- Thurgood Marshall College Fund
- United Negro College Fund
