= Lincoln Junior College =

Defunct college in Florida, US

- Type: Junior college
- Active: 1960–1966
- Location: Fort Pierce, Florida, U.S.

Lincoln Junior College, located in Fort Pierce, Florida, United States, opened its doors in 1960, at the same time as Indian River Junior College (now Indian River State College), restricted to white students. It was designed to serve Indian River, Martin, Okeechobee, and St. Lucie counties. It was one of eleven black community colleges which were founded, at the urging of the Florida Legislature, in the late 1950s and early 1960s to show that a "separate but equal" educational system for blacks existed in Florida; the Legislature wished to avoid the integration mandated by the Supreme Court's Brown v. Board of Education decision of 1954. At the time, there was no nearby college for Negroes, while the distances and lack of funding effectively closed off most local blacks from college.

Initial classes used the facilities of the adjacent Black high school, Lincoln Park Academy. In 1962, a new building added classroom facilities, faculty offices, science laboratories, an administrative unit, a fine arts building, and a student union. Leroy S. Floyd, principal of Lincoln Park Academy, was selected as president of the new institution. In contrast with some of the new presidents, he had eight months to prepare for the September of 1960 opening. With one exception, that all the initial administrators and faculty were also employed in the K-12 school system in St. Lucie County prior to the College's opening.

Offerings included: a college parallel program (64 semester hours) to prepare students for transfer, adult education (preparing for GED), technical offerings in brick masonry, carpentry, waitress training, and technical illustration. The adult program was a part of the evening high school program prior to the College. However, when it became part of the College, enrollment quadrupled from 115 to 446.

Initial enrollment was 98 students. Peak enrollment in its final year (1964–65) was 667 students, of which 221 were in the college parallel program.

In 1964–65 it became apparent that the black institution would soon be merged with Indian River Junior College; the College closed in 1966. It was planned that the Lincoln facility would remain a center of Indian River, but "local political leaders were not ready to promote integrated facilities for the college in the Black community". Uniquely among the twelve black junior colleges, all the full-time faculty became "members of the merged faculty" at Indian River. President Floyd became dean of students at Indian River Junior College.

== See also ==
- Booker T. Washington Junior College
- Roosevelt Junior College
- Jackson Junior College
- Carver Junior College
- Hampton Junior College
- Gibbs Junior College
- Rosenwald Junior College
- Volusia County Community College
- Suwannee River Junior College
- Collier-Blocker Junior College
- Jackson Junior College
- Johnson Junior College
