= Johnson Junior College =

Community college

Coordinates: 28.828°N 81.895°W

- Type: Junior college
- Active: 1962–1966
- Address: 1200 N. Beecher St., Leesburg, Florida, U.S.

Johnson Junior College, located at 1200 N. Beecher St. in Leesburg, Florida, opened its doors in 1962 for black students at the same time as Lake-Sumter Junior College (now Lake–Sumter State College) for white students. It was designed to serve Lake and Sumter Counties. It was one of eleven black community colleges which were founded, at the urging of the Florida Legislature, in the late 1950s and early 1960s to show that a "separate but equal" educational system for blacks existed in Florida; the Legislature wished to avoid the integration mandated by the Supreme Court's Brown v. Board of Education decision of 1954. At the time, there was no nearby college for Negroes, and the distances and lack of funding effectively closed off most local Blacks from college.

The college was named for local Negro educator John Wesley Johnson. Its first president was Perman E. Williams. The founding and only president was Perman E. Williams. The college offered college parallel (transfer) programs and technical programs in Secretarial Science, Food Services, Laboratory Technology, Technical Secretary, Auto Mechanics, and Cosmetology. Initial enrollment was 250; peak enrollment was 397. In 1965, fifty-seven students graduated at the first and only Commencement ever held for Johnson Junior College, although the college had almost one hundred graduates.

Unusual for the new black junior colleges, a common salary schedule was used for both the black and the white colleges. However, the college differed from its Florida peers in that no transportation system was set up to bring students to the college until President Williams purchased a bus out of his personal funds.

Like the other new black junior colleges, for the first two years classes used the facilities of the adjacent Black high school, in this case Carver Heights High School, today Carver Middle School. Classes were offered for both those who wanted to transfer to a four-year college and those who wanted to learn a trade. Three new buildings were constructed, which contained science laboratories, a business education suite, a speech arts laboratory, faculty offices, a library, and facilities for vocational technical programs. Three days after the dedication of the new facilities in 1965, the Lake County Board of Public Instruction determined, in view of the Civil Rights Act of 1964, that the two colleges would be combined, although in practice Johnson Junior College was simply closed. There is no record of any attempt to invite students or employees to join Lake-Sumter, which made "no effort...to properly preserve the official records from Johnson Junior College."

The college operated one more year, 1965–66, as the Johnson Center of Lake–Sumter, and Williams was designated the dean. The high school used some of the facilities, and by the beginning of the 1966–67 academic year, the Johnson Center was closed, Williams took a job elsewhere, and all of the facilities built for Johnson Junior College had been turned over to the high school.

In 1996, the administration building of what was then Lake-Sumter Community College was named the Williams-Johnson building in honor of the college and its president.

== See also ==
- Booker T. Washington Junior College
- Roosevelt Junior College
- Jackson Junior College
- Carver Junior College
- Hampton Junior College
- Gibbs Junior College
- Rosenwald Junior College
- Volusia County Junior College
- Suwannee River Junior College
- Collier-Blocker Junior College
