= Volusia County Junior College =

In Daytona Beach, Florida, United States

- Type: Junior college
- Active: 1958–1965
- Location: 875 Second Avenue, Daytona Beach, Florida, U.S.

Volusia County Junior College, located at 875 Second Avenue in Daytona Beach, Florida, opened its doors in 1958. It was one of twelve black junior colleges founded in the late 1950s at the initiative of the Florida Legislature. Since racial integration in schools was prohibited in the Florida Constitution of 1885 then in effect, the Legislature wished to avoid the integration mandated in the unanimous Brown v. Board of Education Supreme Court decision of 1954 by demonstrating that a "separate but equal" higher education system existed in Florida for African Americans.

Like the other new black junior colleges, it was located near a black high school, in this case Campbell High School (today Campbell Middle School) at 625 S. Keech Street. Besides Volusia County, the school also served Flagler and Seminole Counties. The only president of the college was J. Griffen Greene. According to him, "Volusia County Community College, since its inception, had geared its program for many Negro students who might not be able to meet the standards of a "White" junior college because of previous education under an "unequal" dual public system."

When the college opened, it was in temporary storefront facilities at 875 2nd Avenue, while using the Campbell High School site for physical education and vocational-technical programs. The college had its own classroom building by 1960, at Lockhart and Loomis Streets, near Campbell. A library, band room, and physical education facility were added before the college was closed in 1965; vocational-technical programs remained at Campbell. There were also satellite centers, some in one-teacher Negro schools. At its peak the enrollment was 5,600, of which 494 were in the college program and 5,106 in the adult (GED) and vocational-technical programs.

After the Civil Rights Act of 1964, the college was closed on very short notice in 1965, merging with the previously all-white Daytona Beach Junior College (today Daytona State College). A "Volusia Center", offering sophomore courses only and with the transportation system discontinued, remained operational during 1965-66. Black enrollment plummeted: 450 students made the transfer, but after a year, less than 100 remained. Students were faced with a "repulsive cloud" at the previously all-white school. Ten of the 16 full-time Black faculty members were transferred to Daytona Beach; President Greene was given a job but nothing to do, and he resigned.

== See also ==
- Booker T. Washington Junior College
- Roosevelt Junior College
- Jackson Junior College
- Carver Junior College
- Hampton Junior College
- Gibbs Junior College
- Rosenwald Junior College
- Florida Memorial University
