= Collier-Blocker Junior College =

- Type: Junior college
- Active: 1960–1966
- Location: 1100 N. 19th Street, Palatka, Florida, U.S.

Collier-Blocker Junior College, located at 1100 N. 19th Street in Palatka, Florida, opened its doors in 1960. It was one of eleven black junior colleges founded in the late 1950s at the initiative of the Florida Legislature. The Florida Constitution of 1885 had established legal racial segregation in schools and other facilities. But the unanimous Brown v. Board of Education Supreme Court decision of 1954 ruled that segregated facilities were unconstitutional. The legislature founded new junior colleges to add access to the segregated higher education system in the state. They wanted to demonstrate that a "separate but equal" higher education system existed in Florida for African Americans.

The college, which opened without a name other than "The Negro Junior College", was soon named for Nathan W. Collier and Sara Blocker. These educators had helped establish the Florida Normal and Industrial College in 1918 (a historically black college or university) in St. Augustine which is today's Florida Memorial University.

Collier-Blocker Junior College opened its doors in 1960, shortly after St. Johns River Junior College (today St. Johns River State College), for white students. The college was jointly supported by Clay, St. Johns, and Putnam counties; bus transportation was provided by Clay and St. Johns counties.

The college's initial home was an abandoned church building belonging to Shiloh Baptist Church (today the Greater Shiloh Missionary Baptist Church). It was across the street from the Black Central Academy High School. It moved into its own new building in 1961, located at the west end of Central Academy. The college's only curriculum was college-parallel (preparing for transfer).

Collier-Blocker and Carver Junior College were the least successful of Florida's twelve black junior colleges. It had the lowest level of enrollment and the shortest institutional life. Initial enrollment was 59; peak enrollment was 105. It had governance problems from the outset, and never achieved even limited autonomy. The disappointing level of enrollment meant that almost all the faculty were moonlighting high school teachers. Both faculty and students felt the line between the high school and the college was not clear, or that the college resembled the high school too much. There was no money for a guidance center.

The first president was Albert Williams, who was expected to develop and open the college within one month of his hiring. He resigned under pressure in 1962; the details are not public. He was replaced on an "acting" basis by Fred Brooks, principal of the black high school. He received a $500 supplement to his $8,000 salary for this responsibility. Brooks said he felt "he was taking on the role of caretaker of a dying institution."

The 1964 graduating class was the last; there were 12 graduates. The college was placed under the supervision of St. Johns River Junior College, and the position of president was abolished.

The president of St. Johns believed that Collier-Blocker faculty should emphasize vocational and remedial work in the evening, and said that "only 19 of the students...could meet the standards for admission to St. Johns Junior College." The facility operated as the Collier-Blocker Center of St. Johns, until it was closed completely in 1966. Today the building houses the Robert Jenkins, Jr., Middle School.

In 2012, a wall was created at St. Johns with portraits and other mementos of Collier-Blocker. A plaque on that wall reads:

In the fall of 1960, Collier-Blocker Junior College was established under the leadership of President Albert Williams with the purpose of educating African-American students from Clay, Putman, and St. Johns Counties. The name Collier-Blocker was chosen to honor two well-known African-American Northeasat Florida educators, Dr. Nathan W. Collier and Sara Blocker. From its very creation, the College unfortunately faced adversities including disagreement among its advisory board members over the college name, a lack of strong local community support, and an insufficient amount of planning time prior to the College's opening. President Williams had been given the seemingly unsurmountable challenge of readying the College for full operation in only one month, but with the help of Dean Cleo Higgins, he was successful in meeting the goal and the College began meeting the educational needs of its inaugural class of 59 students in the fall of 1960. The College had its largest enrollment of 106 students during the 1962-63 academic year. While Collier-Blocker was clearly addressing a community need and its initiatives were indeed innovative for its time, the College struggled with obstacles such as low enrollment and a lack of cohesion among the College's leadership. Collier-Blocker's last class graduated in the spring of 1964, and during the 1964-1965 academic year, the College was renamed the Collier-Blocker Center and placed under the purview of St. Johns River Junior College. At the end of the 1965-1966 academic year, the Collier-Blocker Center was dissolved and fully merged with St. Johns River Junior College.

== See also ==
- Booker T. Washington Junior College
- Roosevelt Junior College
- Jackson Junior College
- Carver Junior College
- Hampton Junior College
- Gibbs Junior College
- Rosenwald Junior College
- Suwannee River Junior College
