= Lincoln Park Academy =

School in Fort Pierce, Florida, United States

Location
- 1806 Avenue I Fort Pierce, St. Lucie, Florida 34950; United States; 27°27′32″N 80°20′36″W

Information
- Type: Public, Magnet, Co-educational
- Motto: We do RIGHT because it's RIGHT to do RIGHT.
- Established: 1923
- Principal: Michelle Herrington
- Faculty: 84.25 (FTE)
- Grades: 6-12
- Enrollment: 1,650 (2019-20)
- Student to teacher ratio: 19.58
- Colors: Orange, Black
- Athletics: Yes
- Mascot: Greyhounds https://www.instagram.com/lincoln_lpa?igsh=a2R1c3lyZ2M3aWl4
- National ranking: 856
- Website: https://schools.stlucie.k12.fl.us/lpa/

Lincoln Park Academy is a public magnet school located in Fort Pierce, Florida. Commonly referred to as simply "LPA", the school is academically geared, offering Advanced Placement, International Baccalaureate, dual-enrollment, and pre-engineering course schedules. It was ranked 178th in the "Challenge Index" of United States high schools in The Washington Post in 2014.

== History ==
The history of Lincoln Park Academy can be traced back to 1906 when families in the Woodbine (Marvilla) area in Ft. Pierce requested a teacher. The first school, an old school supply building, was on North Eighth Street. The school had five teachers, eight grades and was open for seven months a year. It was rather poor with no teachers, including the principal having no more than a high school education. There were no teaching materials, not even a dictionary.

The citizens were determined to have a high school. To understand how ambitious this was, there was no full four-year high school for Black students south of Palatka, Florida. In 1921 there were only 18 Black pupils listed in 12th grade in three unaccredited high schools. In September 1923 Lincoln Park Academy opened as a junior high school with five ninth graders. When a new superintendent, Mr. Riggs, was elected he met with a group of citizens at St. Paul AME Church. He told the crowd that they would need to pledge $1,600 to approve the senior high school. Although Superintendent Riggs was skeptical, the citizens paid more than $2,600 during the term. The school board approved the senior high school, thus Lincoln Park Academy was born. During the 1925–1926 term, a new building was completed at a cost of $10,000. It included four classrooms, an office, a library, and an auditorium. Principal Espy put partitions in the classrooms, doubling the capacity. The school year was also expanded to eight months.

When a survey of the schools was made in the 1920s a passage in the report of the survey, commented that education for Black students in Florida "is very spotty, ranging from very good at Lincoln Park Academy, down to the very poorest." In 1928, LPA was accredited as a Standard Senior High School by the Florida State Department of Education. One criterion that contributed to the rapid development was the agreement that all teachers would have bachelor's degrees, usually something reserved only for colleges.

In its early years, Lincoln Park Academy developed a reputation for scholarship, athletics, and student activities. On May 1, 1936, the first school paper was printed, called The Moon. The school won the first State Tournament in boys' basketball in 1930 and again in 1932. New textbooks and furniture were ordered for the school in 1946, which was almost unheard of for an all-Black school.

During the 1953–54 school year, the school board voted for a new campus at its current location. At the time supplies, textbooks, and materials were not distributed equally. Despite its hardships, the school continued to excel academically and athletically. The school became fully accredited by the Southern Association of Colleges and Secondary Schools in 1959. The famous American writer Zora Neale Hurston also joined the staff at LPA briefly as an English teacher and later as a substitute teacher in the late 1950s due to the fact she was unable to obtain her transcripts in order to get a state professional teaching certificate.

Under Principal John L. Walker, the integration of the school's faculty took place. When the county's school system came under federal desegregation order, Lincoln Park was phased out as a high school, and the last class to graduate was the class of 1970. It became a countywide ninth grade center.

In the early 1980s, the school board started looking into the magnet concept and controlled choice. After a tour of the only other district using controlled choice, the school decided to adopt the method. Lincoln Park Academy became the site of the county's first magnet school. The school opened its doors for the 1985–86 school year to seventh and eighth graders. Dr. Lambertson was appointed as the new principal. On May 30, 1990, the first graduating class in twenty years left the halls. The decision was made to purchase land on the north side of the school to build a new high school. The school board approved the contract in 1995, and the ribbon cutting was held in 1997. The auditorium opened in 2000. A new middle school building was constructed and opened for the 2011-2012 school year.

Notable alumni include Melissa Murray, Rob Stein, Devin Cline, Alex Deiulio, Breanna Myles, Jason Fairbanks, and Grace Lloyd.

== Athletics ==
The boys track & field team won the Division 2A Florida state championship in 2002.

Fall Sports

- Cross Country, Bowling, Swimming/Diving, Golf, and Volleyball

Winter Sport

- Basketball, Cheerleading, Wrestling, and Soccer

Spring Sports

- Baseball, Tennis, Track & Field, and Softball

== Recognitions ==
Lincoln Park Academy has been recognized nationally by Newsweek Magazine for it high standards. According to Newsweek's "Challenge Index", Lincoln Park Academy ranked 21st in the nation in 2003, 322nd in 2005, 237th in 2006, 43rd in 2007, 249th in 2008, and 312th in 2009. This ranking takes into effect the difficulty of the courses, including IB and AP testing. The Florida Department of Education has rated LPA an "A" school each year. The school has also made AYP each year under the NCLB Act

== See also ==
- Lincoln Junior College
