= HBCU Library Alliance =

Consortium of libraries at Historically Black Colleges and Universities

- Founded: 2002; 24 years ago
- Type: Nonprofit
- Executive Director: Tracie D. Hall
- Website: hbculibraries.org

The HBCU Library Alliance is a consortium of libraries at Historically Black Colleges and Universities (HBCUs). Founded in 2002 by deans and directors of libraries at HBCUs, the consortium includes more than 90 member organizations. The alliance specifically represents the organizations included in the White House HBCU Initiative. In 2019 the HBCU Library Alliance entered into a national partnership with the Council on Library and Information Resources.

== Leadership and faculty development training ==
The HBCU Library Alliance has provided leadership and faculty development training to member institutions through various grants and sub-granting opportunities. The alliance hosts a leadership institute for deans and directors of HBCU libraries where they learn mentoring, coaching, and strategic planning skills. The Expanding Library Support for Faculty Research in HBCUs Project was an initiative "focused on expanding and improving services in support of faculty research." In 2013, the HBCU Library Alliance partnered with the Association of Southeastern Research Libraries to establish a Librarian Exchange Program to strengthen skills of emerging leaders and foster new connections.

Beginning in 2018, the HBCU Library Alliance partnered with the Digital Library Federation to create the Authenticity Project, which provides mentoring and professional development for early and mid-career library staff from HBCU libraries.

== Preservation initiatives ==
The HBCU Library Alliance has joined with partner organizations for multiple preservation programs.

The Historically Black Colleges and Universities Photographic Preservation Project began in 2007 as a four-phase initiative to improve the preservation of significant photographic collections held within historically black colleges and universities in the United States. These collections document the visual and institutional history and legacy of HBCUs and form a core of primary research materials for the study of African American history. Ten HBCU institutions participated, including Fayetteville State University, Fisk University, Bowie State University, Hampton University, Kentucky State University, Lincoln University of Missouri, Prairie View A&M University, Tennessee State University, Tuskegee University, Virginia State University, and Robert W. Woodruff Library, Atlanta University Center including the Spelman College Archives. The project was funded by a grant from the Andrew W. Mellon Foundation. Partners in the administration of the project included Lyrasis, the Art Conservation Department at the University of Delaware, the HBCU Library Alliance, the Conservation Center for Art and Historic Artifacts, and the Image Permanence Institute.

From 2018 to 2020, the HBCU Library Preservation Internship provided undergraduate students from HBCUs with the opportunity to get hands-on experience with cultural heritage conservation and library preservation.
