= List of colleges and universities in metropolitan Jacksonville =

This is a list of colleges and universities in Jacksonville, Florida and its metropolitan area.

== Institutions ==
Name	Location	Control	Classification	Enrollment	Founded	SACS-accredited
Edward Waters University	Jacksonville	Private	Baccalaureate	1,210	1866	1979
Flagler College	St. Augustine	Private	Baccalaureate	2,675	1968	1973
Florida State College at Jacksonville	Jacksonville	Public	Baccalaureate	45,000	1966	1969
Jacksonville University	Jacksonville	Private	Research	3,741	1934	1962
Nova Southeastern University	Jacksonville	Private	Masters		1964	
St. Johns River State College	Palatka	Public	Baccalaureate	7,291	1958	1963
University of Florida Health Science Center	Jacksonville	Public	Research		1985	1913, through the University of Florida
University of North Florida	Jacksonville	Public	Research	16,134	1969	1974

== See also ==
- List of colleges and universities in Florida for a full listing of the institutions of higher education in Florida.
