= Suwannee River Junior College =

- Type: Junior college
- Active: 1959–1966
- Location: Madison, Florida, U.S.

Suwannee River Junior College, located in Madison, Florida, opened in 1959. It was one of eleven black junior colleges founded in the late 1950s at the initiative of the Florida Legislature. Since racial integration in schools was prohibited in the Florida Constitution of 1885 then in effect, the Legislature wished to avoid the integration mandated in the unanimous Brown v. Board of Education Supreme Court decision of 1954 by demonstrating that a "separate but equal" higher education system existed in Florida for African Americans.

It was founded simultaneously with North Florida Junior College (today North Florida Community College), for white students. The college was jointly supported by Madison, Hamilton, Jefferson, Lafayette, and Taylor Counties. The initial president was James J. Gardener. In 1961 he resigned and was replaced by Jenyethyl Merritt.

The college was focused on preparing students for transfer to a four-year college; the only terminal program was in Secretarial Science. Enrollment the first year was 90. Peak enrollment, in 1964–65, was 402.

Like the other new black junior colleges, it was located near a black high school, in this case Madison County Training School; a Rosenwald school, Suwannee River High School, also shared the site, which today is not in use. During the first year the college functioned in the late afternoon and evening, using the high school facilities. A classroom building was completed in 1960. In 1963, a second unit opened, comprising a library (shared with the high school) and administrative offices. In 1965 a gymnasium, also shared with the high school, was opened.

In response to the Civil Rights Act of 1964, the Madison County Board of Public Instruction announced in December 1965, in the middle of the academic year, that 1965-66 would be the last year of the college's operation. Unusually for Florida's black junior colleges closed at that time, all but two faculty members transferred to the formerly all-white college, North Florida Junior College. However, less than 50 Black students made the transfer. The Black community "lost the feeling of belonging" and "the resentment held by some community persons and students could not be easily overcome". As elsewhere, the facilities for the Black students were closed, and facilities for the white students were minimally affected.

In 2012, at the joint sponsorship of the Madison County Board of Commissioners and the Florida Department of State, a marker was erected at the college's former location, on Madison County Road 360A (today Martin Luther King, Jr. Drive), between SW Atwater Drive and SW Christmas Tree Drive.

The text on the marker reads as follows:

Florida's modern community college system partially owes it development to a statewide system of 12 all-black junior colleges that developed a parallel to a system of white junior colleges during the era of segregation. These institutions were very important for a generation of black Floridians whose access to higher education was limited because of segregation and economic hurdles. Established in 1959, Suwannee River Junior College (SRJC) provided the black residents of north Florida and south Georgia with post-secondary level educational and cultural enrichment opportunities. Like most other black community college institutions founded in the late 1950s and early 1960s, the college had a short life span, lasting only seven years. The Suwannee River Junior College is the first college of any in Florida to have a female president. Jenyethel Merritt, a fixture in the local educational establishment, served as president of SRJC for five of the college's seven years. The college closed its doors in 1966, merging with formerly all-white North Florida Junior College.

In 2016, 50 years after the closure, NFCC sponsored a number of commemorative activities. An exhibit of SRCC yearbooks (the Alligator) and other memorabilia was opened in the college library; plaques from SRJC were installed at various places on campus and students challenged to find them; nominations were sought for a Jenyethel Merritt Award for Civic Service; and plans were made to celebrate a reunion.

== See also ==
- Booker T. Washington Junior College
- Roosevelt Junior College
- Jackson Junior College
- Carver Junior College
- Hampton Junior College
- Gibbs Junior College
- Rosenwald Junior College
