= Booker T. Washington Junior College =

1949-1965 segregated college in Florida

- Type: Junior college
- Active: 1949–1965
- Location: Pensacola, Florida, U.S.

Booker T. Washington Junior College, the first and longest-lasting junior college for African Americans in Florida, was established by the Escambia County school board in 1949. Previously, the only higher education available in Florida to African Americans was at Bethune-Cookman College, Edward Waters College, Florida A&M University, and Florida Memorial College, all historically black.

The college, named for the famous black intellectual Booker T. Washington, shared facilities and administrator with Booker T. Washington High School, in Pensacola, Florida. Its founding and only president and dean, and principal of the high school, was Garrett T. Wiggins, the only educator in northwest Florida with an earned doctorate, described as "the smartest man in Escambia County". Its first class, with 23 students, graduated in 1951. At its peak the college enrolled 361 students. In 1965, in response to the pressures for integration, Washington Junior College was closed. It is often said that the college was merged with Pensacola Junior College (now Pensacola State College), but like Roosevelt Junior College and other Florida black junior colleges, it is more accurate to say it was closed. None of the faculty got similarly paying jobs, and black student enrollment did not transfer en masse to PJC, where students found, at best, an indifferent reception.

== See also ==
- List of things named after Booker T. Washington
- Gibbs Junior College
- Roosevelt Junior College
- Carver Junior College
- Jackson Junior College
- Hampton Junior College
- Rosenwald Junior College
- Suwannee River Junior College
- Volusia County Junior College
- Collier-Blocker Junior College
- Lincoln Junior College
- Johnson Junior College
