= Gibbs Junior College =

Segregated college in St. Petersburg, Florida, U.S.

- Type: Junior college
- Active: 1957–1967
- Location: St. Petersburg, Florida, U.S.

Gibbs Junior College was a junior college in St. Petersburg, Florida, United States. It was created in 1957 by the Pinellas County Board of Public Instruction to serve African-American students. It was the first and most successful of Florida's eleven new African-American junior colleges, founded in an unsuccessful attempt to avoid the racial integration mandated by the unanimous 1954 Supreme Court Brown v. Board of Education decision. It was named for the minister and abolitionist Jonathan C. Gibbs, who opened a private school for freed slaves after the Civil War, and was later Florida's Secretary of State (1868–1872) and then Superintendent of Public Instruction, the first African-American member of the Florida Cabinet.

The founding president was John W. Rembert, who was principal of Gibbs High School.

It opened with 245 students and in its last year as an independent institution had 901 students. During its first year it used the facilities of Gibbs High School, but in 1958 it moved into its own adjacent facility, on the corner of 9th Avenue South and 34th Street South in St. Petersburg, Florida. Free bus transportation was provided to the college by Hillsborough, Manatee, and Sarasota counties. It was the first African-American junior college to become fully accredited by the Southern Association of Colleges and Schools.

In the middle of the 1964-65 school year, amid charges of fraud and possible embezzlement, Rembert was relieved of the presidency, the institution was placed under the supervision of St. Petersburg Junior College (today St. Petersburg College), and its name was changed to the Gibbs campus of St. Petersburg Junior College. The bus service ended, and enrollment plummeted from 901 students in 1964-65 to 597 in 1965-66 and 366 students in 1966-67. In view of the decline in enrollment, and the pressures for integration that caused Florida's other black junior colleges to close in the mid-1960s, the Pinellas County Board of Public Instruction, on the recommendation of St. Petersburg Junior College, closed the campus in 1967.

In 1992, St. Petersburg Junior College named its St. Petersburg campus (unrelated to the facilities of Gibbs Junior College) the Gibbs campus.

== See also ==
- Booker T. Washington Junior College
- Roosevelt Junior College
- Carver Junior College
- Jackson Junior College
- Hampton Junior College
- Rosenwald Junior College
- Suwannee River Junior College
- Volusia County Junior College
- Collier-Blocker Junior College
- Lincoln Junior College
- Johnson Junior College
