= Rosenwald Junior College =

1958-1966 segregated college in Florida

- Type: Junior college
- Active: 1958–1966
- Location: Panama City, Florida, U.S.

Rosenwald Junior College, located in Panama City, Florida, opened its doors in 1958. It was one of eleven black junior colleges founded in the late 1950s at the initiative of the Florida Legislature. Since racial integration in schools was prohibited by the Florida Constitution of 1885 then in effect, the Legislature wished to avoid the integration mandated in the unanimous Brown v. Board of Education Supreme Court decision of 1954 by demonstrating that a "separate but equal" higher education system existed in Florida for African Americans.

Like most of the new junior colleges, it met at first in the facilities of a black high school, in this case Rosenwald High School, a Rosenwald School at 624 Bay Street (now Avenue). The school was named for Julius Rosenwald, a Jewish philanthropist who funded many schools for blacks in the Southern United States. The current Rosenwald High School, at 924 Bay Avenue, has no connection with the former high school other than the name. Calvin Washington, principal of the high school, was appointed president. In 1963, Washington became full-time president of the college. According to him, "we never really had adequate facilities, nor did we have the kind of seed money we needed to get full-time faculty." The college got its own classroom building in 1962.

Initial enrollment was 27. Another source gives the original enrollment as 35, "much lower than the 125 expected." The peak enrollment at the college, in 1964-65, was 177.

The college was merged with the previously all-white Gulf Coast Junior College, now Gulf Coast State College, in 1966. According to Ivie Burch, an administrator, "There was no transition, just closure of Rosenwald." When the college was merged, only one faculty member obtained a job at GCJC. Gulf Coast contains a Rosenwald Junior College Classroom Building, which has no relation to the former facilities of Rosenwald, several miles away. In 2014, Gulf Coast Community College launched the Rosenwald Junior College Center for Social Change and Inclusion.

== See also ==
- Rosenwald Schools
- Booker T. Washington Junior College
- Roosevelt Junior College
- Jackson Junior College
- Carver Junior College
- Hampton Junior College
- Gibbs Junior College
