= Jackson Junior College =

1961-1966 segregated college in Florida

- Type: Junior college
- Active: 1961–1966
- Location: Marianna, Florida, U.S.

Jackson Junior College, in Marianna, Florida, county seat of Jackson County, opened its doors in 1961. It was one of eleven black junior colleges founded in the late 1950s at the initiative of the Florida Legislature. Since racial integration in schools was prohibited in the Florida Constitution of 1885 then in effect, the Legislature wished to avoid the integration mandated in the unanimous Brown v. Board of Education Supreme Court decision of 1954 by demonstrating that a "separate but equal" higher education system existed in Florida for African Americans. Support by local African Americans, who wanted integration, was unenthusiastic.

The Jackson County Board of Public Instruction founded the school as the Negro Junior College. The name was changed before the college opened its doors to students in September, 1961. At the time, Black applicants were not accepted by nearby Chipola Junior College (today Chipola College); the closest opportunity for black students to get a college education was at Florida A&M University, 75 miles away. The college was jointly supported by Calhoun, Jackson, and Washington Counties; bus transportation was provided.

The College was particularly strong in science, sponsoring an annual science fair. It did not have athletic activities or teams. It was primarily oriented toward preparing students to transfer to a four-year college, especially Florida A&M University.

It opened with 47 students and five part-time faculty. Its peak enrollment, in 1964-1965, was 195 students, plus additional "adult education students" (249, in 1965-66) working toward a GED.

For the most part, it shared facilities with the black high school, Jackson County Training School; all the initial teachers were also teachers at the high school, and its only president, William A. Hurley, was also principal of the school. Salaries were lower than they were for the white faculty at Chipola Junior College. A building with classrooms and administrative offices was opened in 1963, although the college continued to use the high school cafeteria and library.

In response to the Civil Rights Act of 1964, the Board of Public Instruction abruptly closed the College in 1966. In contrast with other of Florida's black junior colleges, students were not given "a transition opportunity" to complete their studies at nearby Chipola Junior College (today Chipola College). Only two faculty members made the transfer, and President Hurley reverted to the principalship of Jackson County Training School.

== See also ==
- Booker T. Washington Junior College
- Roosevelt Junior College
- Carver Junior College
- Hampton Junior College
- Gibbs Junior College
- Rosenwald Junior College
- Suwannee River Junior College
- Collier-Blocker Junior College
