= Carver Junior College (Florida) =

1960–1963 segregated college in Florida

- Type: Junior college
- Active: 1960–1963
- Location: Cocoa, Florida, U.S. 28.3512°N 80.7393°W

Carver Junior College, in Cocoa, Florida, was established by the Brevard County Board of Public Instruction in 1960 to serve black students, at the same time that it founded Brevard Junior College, now Eastern Florida State College, for white students. It was named for the black agricultural researcher George Washington Carver. Like 10 of Florida's other 11 black junior colleges, it was founded as a result of a 1957 decision by the Florida Legislature to preserve racial segregation in education, mandated under the 1885 Constitution that was in effect until 1968. More specifically, the Legislature wanted to show, in response to the unanimous Supreme Court decision mandating school integration (Brown vs. Board of Education), that the older standard of "separate but equal" educational facilities was still viable in Florida. Prior to this legislative initiative, the only publicly funded colleges for negro or colored students (as they were called at the time) were Florida A&M University, in Tallahassee, and Booker T. Washington Junior College, in Pensacola.

The only President of the college was James R. Greene, who was also principal of the black Monroe Senior High School. In 1962 the Carver Junior College building, adjacent to the high school, and funded by the Florida Department of Education, was completed.

Enrollment was

- 1960-61 year: 168
- 1961-62 year: 263
- 1962-63 year: 143

As with the other Florida black community colleges, support from the black community, which wanted full integration, was unenthusiastic. The NAACP complained to the U.S. Commission on Civil Rights that the college was costing $100,000 per year, enrollment was low, high school teachers and facilities were being used, and educational outcomes were unsatisfactory.

In 1963, citing inadequate enrollment, the Board of Public Instruction made the decision to close the college by merging it with Brevard Community College (today Eastern Florida State College). The Carver site operated as a branch of Brevard Community College for the 1963-64 academic year, so existing students could complete the programs they had started. After 1964 no college classes were held at the Carver site, and its facilities were turned over to Monroe High School.

In the 1990s Brevard Community College named a new building the George Washington Carver Administrative Center, and placed a portrait of President Greene there.

== See also ==
- Booker T. Washington Junior College
- Gibbs Junior College
- Roosevelt Junior College
- Jackson Junior College
- Hampton Junior College
