= Hampton Junior College =

Junior college in Ocala, Florida

- Former name: Howard Junior College
- Type: Junior college
- Active: 1958–1966
- Location: Ocala, Florida, U.S.

Hampton Junior College, located in Ocala, Florida, opened its doors in 1958. It was one of eleven black community colleges which were founded, at the urging of the Florida Legislature, to show that a "Separate but equal" educational system for blacks existed in Florida; the Legislature wished to avoid the integration mandated by the Supreme Court's Brown v. Board of Education decision of 1954. At the time, the closest public college that would accept negroes was Florida A&M University, 175 miles away.

It operated under the direction of the Marion County Board of Public Instruction, with support from adjacent Citrus and Levy counties. Three representatives from each county made up the college's advisory committee.

Its original name, Howard Junior College, was changed during its first year of operation in honor of L. R. Hampton Sr., a local dentist who had advanced black education in Marion County.

It began operations using the facilities of the black Howard High School (today Howard Middle School), which meant classes had to be held in the late afternoon and evening. In 1960-61 its own facilities were completed. They consisted of a classroom building, a library shared with the high school, an industrial building, and an administrative building which housed faculty offices and the student lounge.

The only president of the college was its founding one, William H. Jackson. Like most of the black community college presidents he was principal of a high school, in this case Howard High School, on whose campus the junior college was located. However, in contrast with most of the other principal/presidents, in 1961 he became full-time president of the college.

Its peak enrollment, in the 1964–65 school year, was 890. A total of 3,905 students studied there during its eight years of operation. 317 graduated.

In 1966 the institution was merged with Central Florida Junior College, today the College of Central Florida, which was also founded in 1958. It was the last of Florida's twelve black junior colleges to be merged. Of the 778 students during its final year, 207 enrolled at Central Florida Junior College. 10 of the 19 regular faculty members transferred to Central Florida.

== See also ==
- Booker T. Washington Junior College
- Gibbs Junior College
- Roosevelt Junior College
- Carver Junior College
- Jackson Junior College
