= Roosevelt Junior College =

1958-1965 segregated college in Florida

- Type: Junior college
- Active: 1958–1965
- Address: 1235 Fifteenth Street, West Palm Beach, Florida, U.S.

Roosevelt Junior College was an institution serving African-American students, located on an 18-acre campus at 1235 Fifteenth Street in West Palm Beach, Florida. It took its name from the adjacent black Roosevelt High School, named in honor of former U.S. President Theodore Roosevelt.

It opened its doors in 1958, and for its first year was located in the facilities of Roosevelt High School, which was merged with Palm Beach High School in 1970 to create Twin Lakes High School. Its first and only president was Britton G. Sayles (also principal of Roosevelt High School). It was authorized and jointly supported by the State of Florida under the Minimum Foundation Program Law passed in 1947 by the Florida Legislature. When founded, it was one of 11 black junior colleges in the state of Florida founded to resist Brown v. Board of Education by showing that "separate but equal" higher education was available for African Americans; none survive today (2018). It was abruptly closed by the Palm Beach County Board of Public Instruction in 1965, leaving a bitterness which endures among its surviving staff and alumni. According to President Sayles, "the entire process was handled very unprofessionally." While sometimes it is said to have merged with Palm Beach Junior College (today Palm Beach State College), which began integration "sparingly" in 1963, this is not the recollection of those associated with the college. "There was no merger. They closed it, and there was never any mention of it. That was the end of it." According to President Sayles, six faculty, including two librarians, were transferred to Palm Beach Junior College; the rest lost their jobs.

At its peak, the College had 18 faculty and staff and 200 students. It was accredited by the Southern Association of Colleges and Schools and was authorized to award the Associate of Arts degree. The following programs were offered: General Education (with majors in Science, Pre-Medical, Pre-Dental), General Business, Pre-Teaching, Pre-Law, Secretarial. Terminal programs were offered in General Education and Business.

In 2005, surviving alumni and staff held a reunion luncheon; the program of the luncheon describes the faculty as "very close knit". Palm Beach Community College named a building at its Lake Worth campus for Sayles in 2003, and in 2006 held a dedication ceremony for the newly renovated Britton G. Sayles Social Science Building.

== See also ==
- Booker T. Washington Junior College
- Gibbs Junior College
- Carver Junior College
- Jackson Junior College
- Hampton Junior College
