= Separate but equal =

Discredited US legal doctrine used for racial segregation

Separate but equal was a legal doctrine in United States constitutional law, according to which racial segregation did not necessarily violate the Fourteenth Amendment to the United States Constitution, which nominally guaranteed "equal protection" under the law to all people. Under the doctrine, as long as the facilities provided to each race were equal, state and local governments could require that services, facilities, public accommodations, housing, medical care, education, employment, and transportation be segregated by race, which was already the case throughout the states of the former Confederacy. The phrase was derived from a Louisiana law of 1890, although the law actually used the phrase "equal but separate".

The doctrine was confirmed in the U.S. Supreme Court decision Plessy v. Ferguson (1896), which allowed state-sponsored segregation. Although segregation laws existed before that case, the decision emboldened segregation states during the Jim Crow era, which had commenced in 1876, and supplanted the Black Codes, which restricted the civil rights and civil liberties of African Americans during the Reconstruction era.

In practice, the separate facilities provided to African Americans were rarely equal; usually they were not even close to equal, or they did not exist at all. For example, in the 1930 census, black people were 29% of Florida's population, yet according to the 1934–1936 report of the Florida Superintendent of Public Instruction, the value of "white school property" in the state was $70,543,000, while the value of African American school property was $4,900,000. The report says that "in a few south Florida counties and in most north Florida counties many Negro schools are housed in churches, shacks, and lodges, and have no toilets, water supply, desks, blackboards, etc. Counties use these schools as a means to get State funds and yet these counties invest little or nothing in them." At that time, high school education for African Americans was provided in only 28 of Florida's 67 counties. In 1939–1940, the average salary of a white teacher in Florida was $1,148, whereas for a black teacher it was $585. In 1930s Pompano, Florida:

During the era of segregation, the myth was that the races were separated but were provided equal facilities. No one believed it. Almost without exception, black students were given inferior buildings and instructional materials. Black educators were generally paid less than their white counterparts and had more students in their classrooms.... In 1938, Pompano white schools collectively had one teacher for every 25 students, while the Pompano Colored School had one teacher for every 54 students. At the Hammondville School, the single teacher employed there had 67 students.

Because new research showed that segregating students by race was harmful to them, even if facilities were equal, "separate but equal" facilities were found to be unconstitutional in a series of Supreme Court decisions under Chief Justice Earl Warren, starting with Brown v. Board of Education of 1954. However, the subsequent overturning of segregation laws and practices was a long process that lasted through much of the 1950s, 1960s, and 1970s, involving federal legislation (especially the Civil Rights Act of 1964), and many court cases.

== Background ==
The American Civil War brought slavery in the United States to an end with the ratification of the Thirteenth Amendment in 1865. Following the war, the Fourteenth Amendment guaranteed equal protection under the law to all people, and Congress established the Freedmen's Bureau to assist in the integration of former slaves into Southern society. The Reconstruction era brought new freedoms and laws promoting racial equality to the South. However, after the Compromise of 1877 ended Reconstruction and withdrew federal troops from all Southern states, many former slaveholders and Confederates were elected to office. The Fourteenth Amendment guaranteed equal protection to all people but Southern states contended that the requirement of equality could be met in a way that kept the races separate. Furthermore, the state and federal courts tended to reject the pleas by African Americans that their Fourteenth Amendment rights were violated, arguing that the Fourteenth Amendment applied only to federal, not state, citizenship. This rejection is evident in the Slaughter-House Cases and Civil Rights Cases.

After the end of Reconstruction, the federal government adopted a general policy of leaving racial segregation up to the individual states. One example of this policy was the second Morrill Act (Morrill Act of 1890). Before the end of the war, the Morrill Land-Grant Colleges Act (Morrill Act of 1862) had provided federal funding for higher education by each state with the details left to the state legislatures. The 1890 Act implicitly accepted the legal concept of "separate but equal" for the 17 states that had institutionalized segregation.

Provided, That no money shall be paid out under this act to any State or Territory for the support and maintenance of a college where a distinction of race or color is made in the admission of students, but the establishment and maintenance of such colleges separately for white and colored students shall be held to be a compliance with the provisions of this act if the funds received in such State or Territory be equitably divided as hereinafter set forth.

In New York, courts repealed the local "separate but equal" statute in 1938 and the last school for African-American children in New York was shut down in 1944.

== Early legal support ==
=== Laws ===
In the late 1800s, many states of the former Confederacy adopted laws, collectively known as Jim Crow laws, that mandated separation of whites and African Americans. The Florida Constitution of 1885 and that of West Virginia mandated separate educational systems. In Texas, laws required separate water fountains, restrooms, and waiting rooms in railroad stations. In Georgia, restaurants and taverns could not serve white and "colored" patrons in the same room; separate parks for each race were required, as were separate cemeteries. These are just examples from a large number of similar laws.

Prior to the Second Morrill Act, 17 states excluded blacks from access to the land-grant colleges without providing similar educational opportunities. In response to the Second Morrill Act, 17 states established separate land-grant colleges for blacks which are now referred to as public historically black colleges and universities (HBCUs). In fact, some states adopted laws prohibiting schools from educating blacks and whites together, even if a school was willing to do so. The constitutionality of such laws was upheld in Berea College v. Kentucky (1908) 211 U.S. 45.

=== Plessy v. Ferguson ===
The legitimacy of such laws under the Fourteenth Amendment was upheld by the U.S. Supreme Court in the 1896 case of Plessy v. Ferguson, 163 U.S. 537 (1896). The Plessy doctrine was extended to the public schools in Cumming v. Richmond County Board of Education, 175 U.S. 528 (1899).

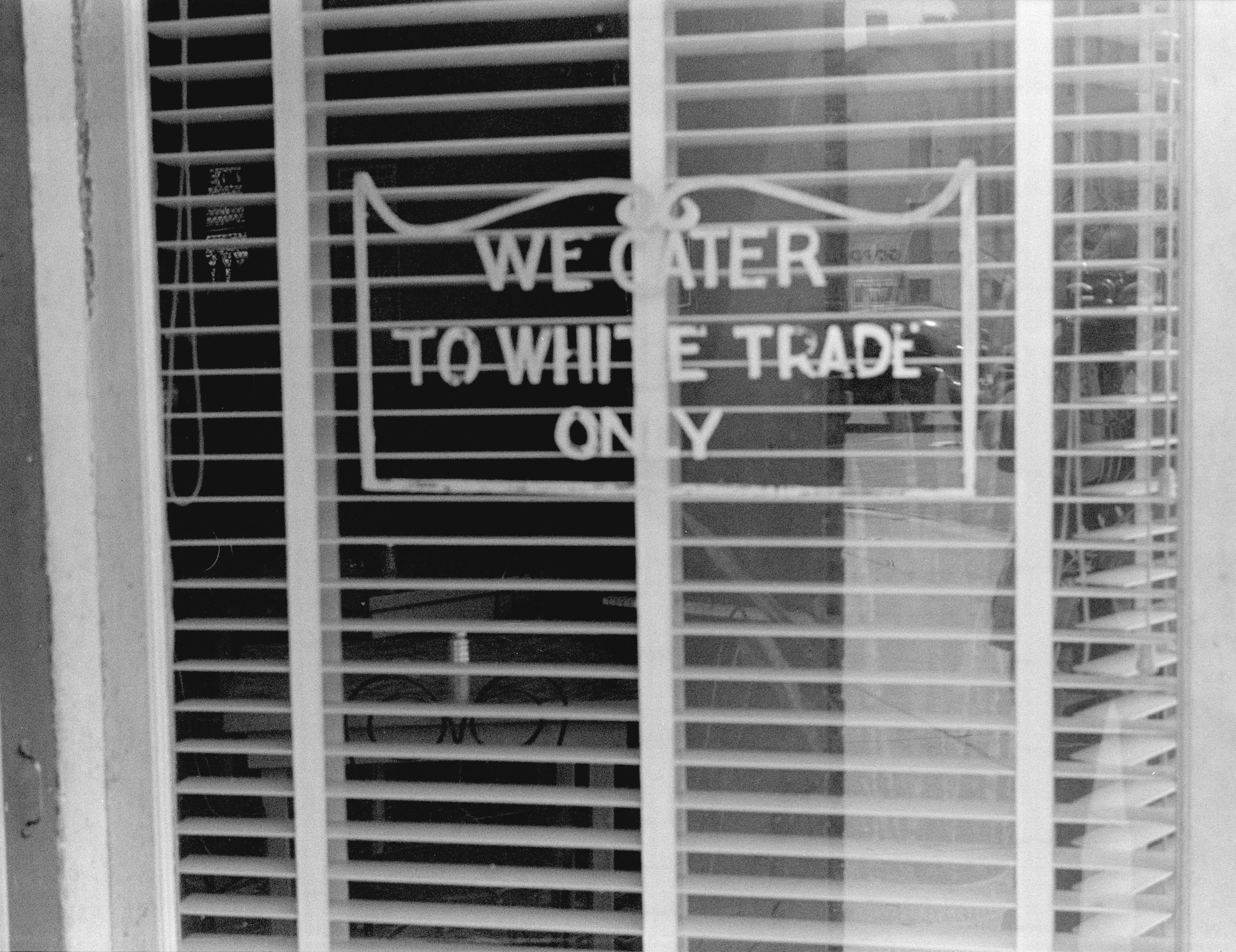
"We cater to white trade only". A restaurant in Lancaster, Ohio, in 1938.

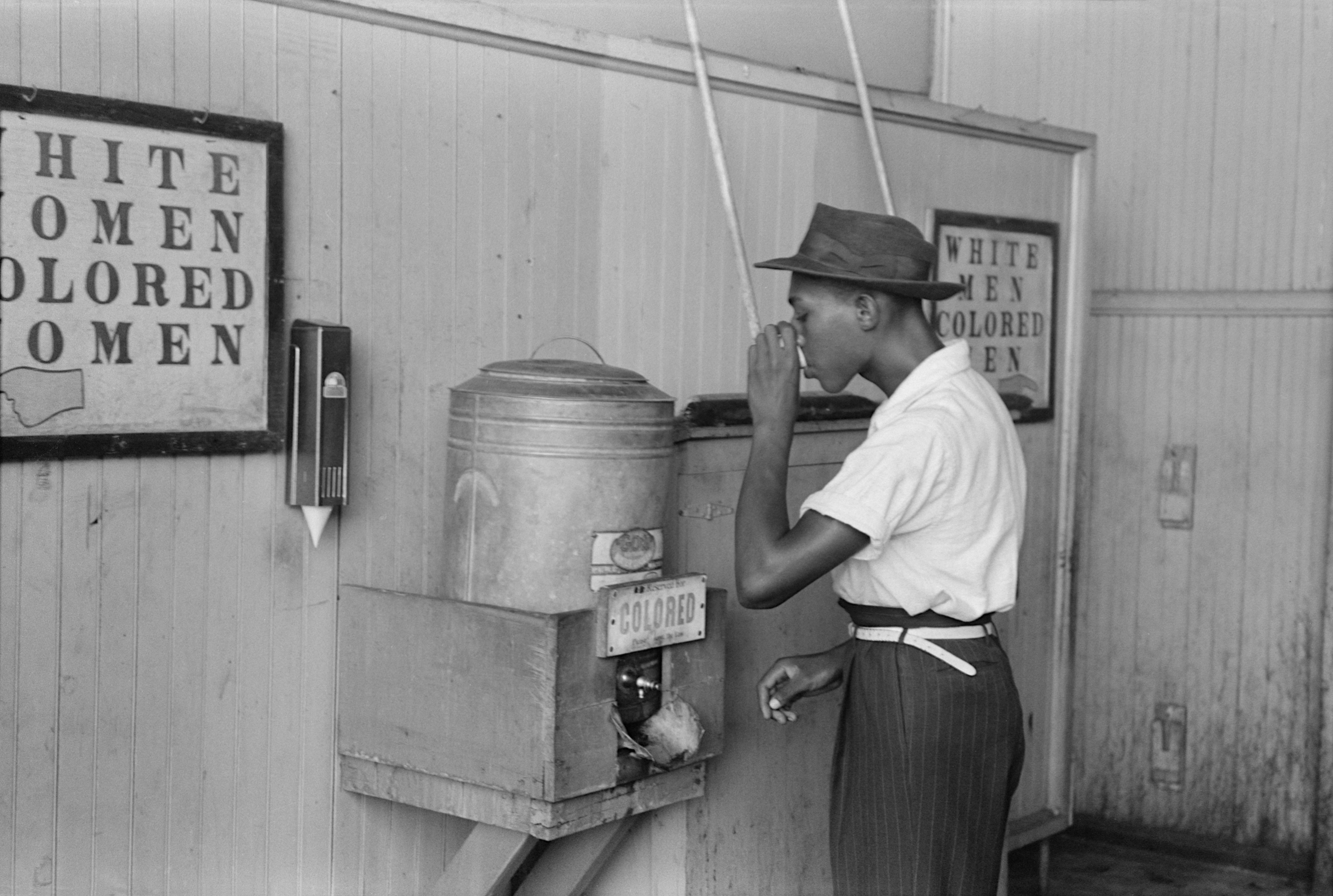
A "colored" drinking fountain in Oklahoma City, 1939

In 1892, Homer Plessy, who was of mixed ancestry and appeared to be white, boarded an all-white railroad car between New Orleans and Covington, Louisiana. The conductor of the train collected passenger tickets at their seats. When Plessy told the conductor he was 7/8 white and 1/8 black, he was informed that he had to move to a coloreds-only car. Plessy said he resented sitting in a coloreds-only car and was arrested immediately.

One month after his arrest, Plessy appeared in court before Judge John Howard Ferguson. Plessy's lawyer, Albion Tourgee, claimed Plessy's 13th and 14th amendment rights were violated. The Thirteenth Amendment abolished slavery, and the 14th amendment gave equal protection to all under the law.

The Supreme Court decision in Plessy v. Ferguson formalized the legal principle of "separate but equal". The ruling required "railway companies carrying passengers in their coaches in that State to provide equal, but separate, accommodations for the white and colored races". Accommodations provided on each railroad car were required to be the same as those provided on the others. Separate railroad cars could be provided. The railroad could refuse service to passengers who refused to comply, and the Supreme Court ruled this did not infringe upon the 13th and 14th amendments.

The "separate but equal" doctrine applied in theory to all public facilities: not only railroad cars but schools, medical facilities, theaters, restaurants, restrooms, and drinking fountains. However, neither state nor Congress put "separate but equal" into the statute books, meaning the provision of equal services to non-whites could not be legally enforced. The only possible remedy was through federal court, but costly legal fees and expenses meant that this was out of the question for individuals; it took an organization with resources, the NAACP, to file and pursue Brown v. Board of Education.

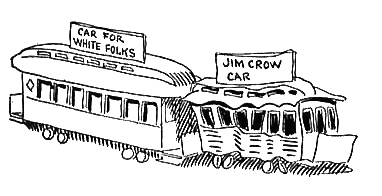
1904 caricature of "White" and "Jim Crow" rail cars by John T. McCutcheon

Equal facilities were unusual. The facilities and social services offered to African Americans were almost always of a lower quality than those offered to white Americans, if they existed at all. Most African-American schools had less public funding per student than nearby white schools; they had old textbooks, discarded by the white schools, used equipment, and poorly paid, prepared, or taught and trained teachers. In addition, according to a study conducted by the American Psychological Association, black students are emotionally impaired when segregated at a young age. In Texas, the state established a state-funded law school for white students but none for black students. As previously mentioned, the majority of counties in Florida during the 1930s had no high school for African-American students. African Americans had to pay state and local taxes that were used for the benefit of whites only. (See Florida A&M Hospital for an example.)

Although the "Separate but Equal" doctrine was eventually overturned by the U.S. Supreme Court in Brown v. Board of Education (1954), the implementation of the changes this decision required was long, contentious, and sometimes violent (see massive resistance and Southern Manifesto). While modern legal doctrine interprets the 14th amendment to prohibit explicit segregation on the basis of race, societal issues surrounding racial discrimination still remain topical (see racial profiling).

== Legal rejection ==
=== Before Warren Court ===
The repeal of such restrictive laws, generally known as Jim Crow laws, was a key focus of the Civil Rights Movement prior to 1954. In Sweatt v. Painter, the Supreme Court addressed a legal challenge to the doctrine when a Texan black student, Heman Marion Sweatt, was seeking admission into the state-supported School of Law of the University of Texas. Since Texas did not have a law school for black students, the lower court continued the case for six months so that a state-funded law school for black students (now known as Thurgood Marshall School of Law at Texas Southern University) could be created. When further appeals to the Texas Supreme Court failed, Sweatt, along with the NAACP, took the case to the federal courts, before it eventually reached the Supreme Court of the United States. Here, the original decision was reversed and Sweatt was admitted into the University of Texas School of Law. This decision was based on the grounds that the separate school failed to qualify as being "equal", because of both quantitative differences, such as its facilities, and intangible factors, such as its isolation from most of the future lawyers with whom its graduates would interact. The court held that, when considering graduate education, intangible factors must be considered as part of "substantive equality". The same day, the Supreme Court in McLaurin v. Oklahoma State Regents ruled that segregation laws in Oklahoma, which had required an African-American graduate student working on a Doctor of Education degree to sit in the hallway outside the classroom door, did not qualify as "separate but equal". These cases ended the "separate but equal" doctrine in graduate and professional education.

=== The Warren Court ===
In 1953, Earl Warren became the 14th Chief Justice of the United States, and the Warren Court started a liberal constitutional revolution which outlawed racial segregation and "separate but equal" throughout the United States in a series of landmark rulings.

In Brown v. Board of Education (1954), 347 U.S. 483, attorneys for the NAACP referred to the phrase "equal but separate" used in Plessy v. Ferguson as a custom de jure racial segregation enacted into law. The NAACP, led by Thurgood Marshall (who became the first black Supreme Court Justice in 1967), was successful in challenging the constitutional viability of the "separate but equal" doctrine. The Warren Court voted to overturn sixty years of law that had developed under Plessy. The Warren Court outlawed segregated public education facilities for blacks and whites at the state level. The companion case of Bolling v. Sharpe, 347 U.S. 497, outlawed such practices at the Federal level in the District of Columbia. Chief Justice Earl Warren wrote in the court opinion:

We conclude that, in the field of public education, the doctrine of "separate but equal" has no place. Separate educational facilities are inherently unequal. Therefore, we hold that the plaintiffs and others similarly situated for whom the actions have been brought are, by reason of the segregation complained of, deprived of the equal protection of the laws guaranteed by the Fourteenth Amendment.

Although Brown overturned the doctrine of "separate but equal" in institutions of public education, it would be almost ten more years before the Civil Rights Act of 1964 would prohibit racial discrimination in facilities that were deemed public accommodations (transportation, hotels, etc.).

Additionally, in 1967, under Loving v. Virginia, the Warren Court declared Virginia's anti-miscegenation statute, the Racial Integrity Act of 1924, unconstitutional, thus invalidating all anti-miscegenation laws in the United States. Chief Justice Earl Warren wrote the court majority opinion.

=== After Warren Court ===
In 1975, Jake Ayers Sr. filed a lawsuit against Mississippi, stating that they gave more financial support to the predominantly white public colleges. The state settled the lawsuit in 2002, directing $503 million to three historically black colleges over 17 years.

== See also ==
- Apartheid ("separate development")
- Anti-miscegenation laws in the United States
- Federal voting rights in Puerto Rico
- Jim Crow laws
- Racial segregation in the United States
