= List of college athletic programs in Florida =

This is a list of college athletic programs in the U.S. state of Florida.

== NCAA ==
=== Division I ===
Full NCAA Division I member colleges in Florida.
- FBS Football, - FCS Football, - Non-football

Team	School	City	Conference	Sport sponsorship						
Team	School	City	Conference	Football	Basketball		Baseball	Softball	Soccer	
Team	School	City	Conference	Football	M	W	Baseball	Softball	M	W
Bethune-Cookman Wildcats	Bethune-Cookman University	Daytona Beach	SWAC	FCS	Yes	Yes	Yes	Yes	No	No
FAU Owls	Florida Atlantic University	Boca Raton	The American	FBS	Yes	Yes	Yes	Yes	Yes	Yes
FGCU Eagles	Florida Gulf Coast University	Fort Myers	Atlantic Sun	No	Yes	Yes	Yes	Yes	Yes	Yes
FIU Panthers	Florida International University	Miami	C-USA	FBS	Yes	Yes	Yes	Yes	Yes (Note: FIU's men's soccer team competes in the American Athletic Conference.)	Yes
Florida Gators	University of Florida	Gainesville	SEC	FBS	Yes	Yes	Yes	Yes	No	Yes
Florida A&M Rattlers and Lady Rattlers	Florida Agricultural & Mechanical University	Tallahassee	SWAC	FCS	Yes	Yes	Yes	Yes	No	No
Florida State Seminoles	Florida State University	Tallahassee	ACC	FBS	Yes	Yes	Yes	Yes	No	Yes
Jacksonville Dolphins	Jacksonville University	Jacksonville	Atlantic Sun	No	Yes	Yes	Yes	Yes	Yes	Yes
Miami Hurricanes	University of Miami	Coral Gables	ACC	FBS	Yes	Yes	Yes	No	No	Yes
North Florida Ospreys	University of North Florida	Jacksonville	Atlantic Sun	No	Yes	Yes	Yes	Yes	Yes	Yes
South Florida Bulls	University of South Florida	Tampa	The American	FBS	Yes	Yes	Yes	Yes	Yes	Yes
Stetson Hatters	Stetson University	DeLand	Atlantic Sun	FCS (Note: Stetson's football team competes in the Pioneer Football League.)	Yes	Yes	Yes	Yes	Yes	Yes
UCF Knights	University of Central Florida	Orlando	Big 12	FBS	Yes	Yes	Yes	Yes	Yes (Note: UCF's men's soccer team competes in the Sun Belt Conference.)	Yes
West Florida Argonauts	University of West Florida	Pensacola	Atlantic Sun	FCS (Note: West Florida's football team competes in the United Athletic Conference.)	Yes	Yes	Yes	Yes	Yes	Yes

=== Division II ===
Full NCAA Division II member colleges in Florida.
- Football member, - Non-football member

Team	School	City	Conference	Sport sponsorship						
Team	School	City	Conference	Football	Basketball		Baseball	Softball	Soccer	
Team	School	City	Conference	Football	M	W	Baseball	Softball	M	W
Barry Buccaneers	Barry University	Miami Shores	Sunshine State	No	Yes	Yes	Yes	Yes	Yes	Yes
Eckerd Tritons	Eckerd College	St. Petersburg	Sunshine State	No	Yes	Yes	Yes	Yes	Yes	Yes
Edward Waters Tigers	Edward Waters University	Jacksonville	SIAC	Yes	Yes	Yes	Yes	Yes	No	Yes (Note: Edward Waters' women's soccer team competes as an independent.)
Embry-Riddle Eagles	Embry-Riddle Aeronautical University, Daytona Beach	Daytona Beach	Sunshine State	No	Yes	Yes	Yes	Yes	Yes	Yes
Flagler Saints	Flagler College	St. Augustine	Peach Belt	No	Yes	Yes	Yes	Yes	Yes	Yes
Florida Southern Moccasins	Florida Southern College	Lakeland	Sunshine State	No	Yes	Yes	Yes	Yes	Yes	Yes
Florida Tech Panthers	Florida Institute of Technology	Melbourne	Sunshine State	No	Yes	Yes	Yes	Yes	Yes	Yes
Lynn Fighting Knights	Lynn University	Boca Raton	Sunshine State	No	Yes	Yes	Yes	Yes	Yes	Yes
Nova Southeastern Sharks	Nova Southeastern University	Davie	Sunshine State	No	Yes	Yes	Yes	Yes	Yes	Yes
Palm Beach Atlantic Sailfish	Palm Beach Atlantic University	West Palm Beach	Sunshine State	No	Yes	Yes	Yes	Yes	Yes	Yes
Rollins Tars	Rollins College	Winter Park	Sunshine State	No	Yes	Yes	Yes	Yes	Yes	Yes
Saint Leo Lions	Saint Leo University	Saint Leo	Sunshine State	No	Yes	Yes	Yes	Yes	Yes	Yes
Tampa Spartans	University of Tampa	Tampa	Sunshine State	No	Yes	Yes	Yes	Yes	Yes	Yes

== NAIA ==
Full NAIA member colleges in Florida.
- Football, - Non-football

Team	School	City	Conference	Sport sponsorship						
Team	School	City	Conference	Football	Basketball		Baseball	Softball	Soccer	
Team	School	City	Conference	Football	M	W	Baseball	Softball	M	W
Ave Maria Gyrenes	Ave Maria University	Ave Maria	The Sun	Yes	Yes	Yes	Yes	Yes	Yes	Yes
Florida College Falcons	Florida College	Temple Terrace	Continental	No	Yes	No	No	No	Yes	Yes
Florida Memorial Lions	Florida Memorial University	Miami Gardens	The Sun	Yes (Note: Florida Memorial, Keiser, St. Thomas, Warner, and Webber additionally sponsor flag football as a women's varsity sport.)	Yes	Yes	Yes	No	Yes	Yes
Florida National Conquistadors	Florida National University	Hialeah	Continental	No	Yes	Yes	Yes	Yes	Yes	Yes
Keiser Seahawks	Keiser University	West Palm Beach	The Sun	Yes	Yes	Yes	Yes	Yes	Yes	Yes
New College Banyans	New College of Florida	Sarasota	The Sun	No	Yes	Yes	Yes	Yes	Yes	Yes
St. Thomas Bobcats	St. Thomas University	Miami Gardens	The Sun	Yes	Yes	Yes	Yes	Yes	Yes	Yes
Southeastern Fire	Southeastern University	Lakeland	The Sun	Yes	Yes	Yes	Yes	Yes	Yes	Yes
Warner Royals	Warner University	Lake Wales	The Sun	Yes	Yes	Yes	Yes	Yes	Yes	Yes
Webber International Warriors	Webber International University	Babson Park	The Sun	Yes	Yes	Yes	Yes	Yes	Yes	Yes

== NJCAA ==
=== Division I ===
Team	School	City	Conference
Broward Seahawks	Broward College	Davie	Southern
Central Florida Patriots	College of Central Florida	Ocala	Mid-Florida
Chipola Indians	Chipola College	Marianna	Panhandle
Daytona State Falcons	Daytona State College	Daytona Beach	Mid-Florida
Eastern Florida State Titans	Eastern Florida State College	Melbourne	Southern
Florida SouthWestern Buccaneers	Florida SouthWestern State College	Fort Myers	Suncoast
Florida State College Blue Wave	Florida State College at Jacksonville	Jacksonville	Mid-Florida
Gulf Coast Commodores	Gulf Coast State College	Panama City	Panhandle
Hillsborough Hawks	Hillsborough Community College	Tampa	Suncoast
Indian River State Pioneers	Indian River State College	Fort Pierce	Southern
Lake Sumter Lakehawks	Lake-Sumter State College	Leesburg	Mid-Florida
Miami Dade Sharks	Miami Dade College	Miami	Southern
Northwest Florida State Raiders	Northwest Florida State College	Niceville	Panhandle
Palm Beach Panthers	Palm Beach State College	Lake Worth	Southern
Pensacola Pirates	Pensacola State College	Pensacola	Panhandle
Polk Eagles	Polk State College	Winter Haven	Suncoast
St. Johns River Vikings	St. Johns River State College	Palatka	Mid-Florida
St. Petersburg Titans	St. Petersburg College	St. Petersburg	Suncoast
Santa Fe Saints	Santa Fe College	Gainesville	Mid-Florida
Seminole Raiders	Seminole State College of Florida	Sanford	Mid-Florida
South Florida Panthers	South Florida State College	Avon Park	Suncoast
State College of Florida Manatees	State College of Florida, Manatee-Sarasota	Bradenton	Suncoast
Tallahassee Eagles	Tallahassee Community College	Tallahassee	Panhandle

=== Division II ===
Team	School	City	Conference
Florida Gateway Timberwolves	Florida Gateway College	Lake City	Independent
Pasco-Hernando Conquistadors	Pasco-Hernando State College	New Port Richey	Independent

== NCCAA ==
Team	School	City	Division
Fort Lauderdale Eagles	University of Fort Lauderdale	Lauderhill	DI South
Pensacola Christian Eagles	Pensacola Christian College	Pensacola	DII South
Trinity Baptist Eagles	Trinity Baptist College	Jacksonville	DII South
Warner Royals	Warner University	Lake Wales	DI South

== USCAA ==
Team	School	City
Atlantis Atlanteans	Atlantis University	Miami
Beacon Blazers	Beacon College	Leesburg
Trinity Tigers	Trinity College of Florida	Trinity
United International Eagle Rays	United International College	Miramar

== See also ==
- List of NCAA Division I institutions
- List of NCAA Division II institutions
- List of NCAA Division III institutions
- List of NAIA institutions
- List of USCAA institutions
- List of NCCAA institutions
- List of NJCAA Division I institutions
- List of NJCAA Division II institutions
- List of NJCAA Division III institutions
