= Sports teams in Florida =

Overview of sports teams in the U.S. state of Florida

Florida has many professional, semi-professional, amateur and college teams. At the professional level, Florida has three National Football League teams, two Major League Baseball teams, two National Basketball Association teams, two National Hockey League teams, two Major League Soccer teams, three Women's Soccer teams and many minor league teams in various sports. Additionally, since the late 19th century Florida has been a significant spring training destination for Major League Baseball teams and their affiliates.

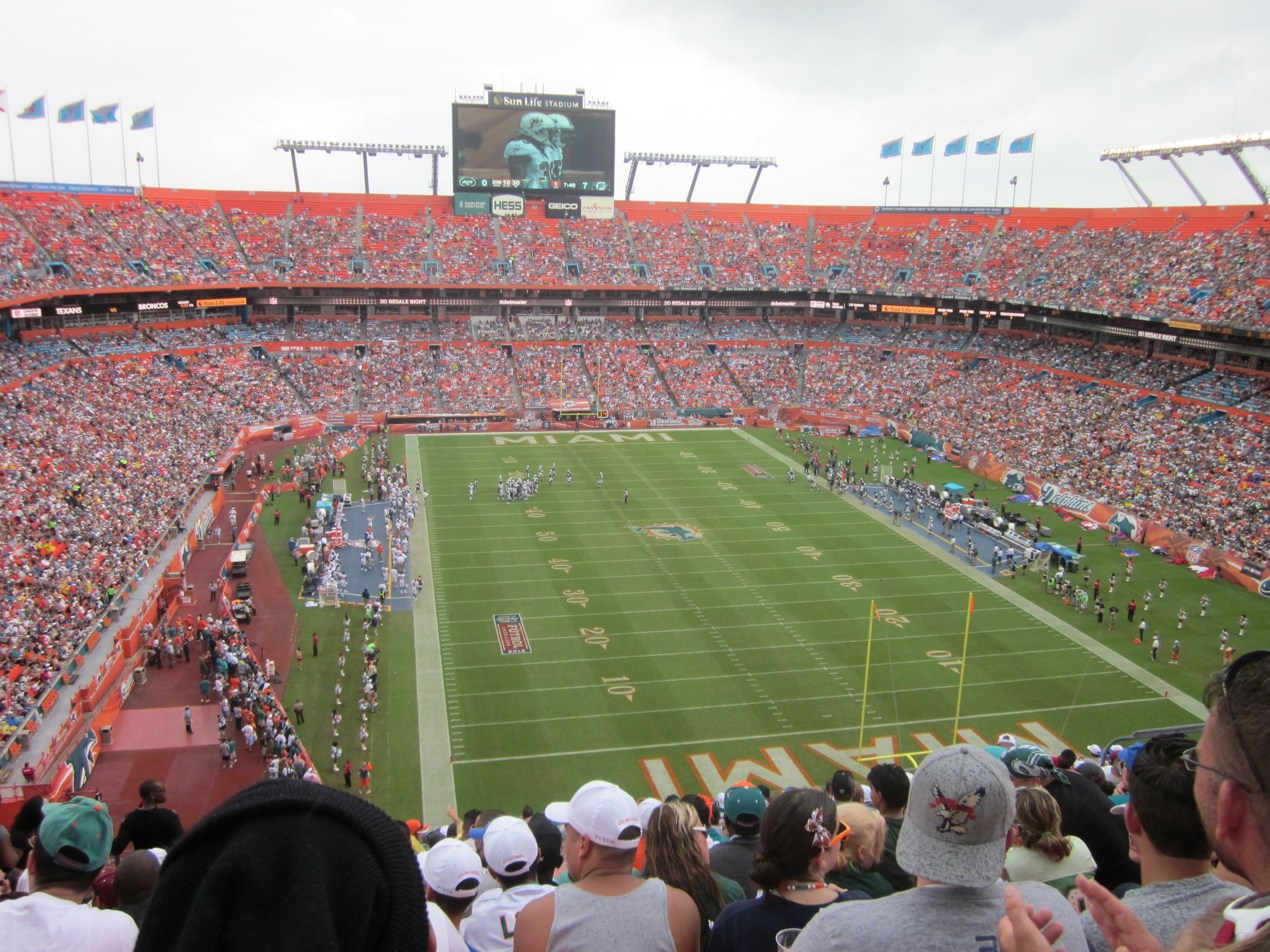
The Miami Dolphins play at what was then the Sun Life Stadium.

In college sports, thirteen Florida schools compete in NCAA Division I. Various others compete in other organizations including NCAA Division II, the NAIA, the NJCAA, the USCAA, and the NCCAA.

== Professional major league teams ==
Location of major league teams in Florida

Florida has teams in all of the major league sports — National Football League, Major League Baseball, National Basketball Association, National Hockey League, and Major League Soccer. In the early 1980s, Florida had major league teams in only the NFL. Florida has since added two NBA teams in the late 1980s. Florida added two NHL teams in the 1990s as part of the NHL's expansion into the south, and two MLB teams in the 1990s. Florida's most recent major-league team, Inter Miami CF, began play in MLS in 2020, after Florida's first MLS team since the folding of the Tampa Bay Mutiny and Miami Fusion in 2001, Orlando City, joined in 2015. Florida has a team in one of the two most prominent women's leagues, and formerly had two teams in the other.

Club	Sport	League	Venue	Championships (Years)	Founded
Miami Marlins	Baseball	MLB	loanDepot Park	2 (1997, 2003)	1993
Tampa Bay Rays	Baseball	MLB	Tropicana Field	0	1998
Miami Heat	Basketball	NBA	Kaseya Center	3 (2006, 2012, 2013)	1988
Orlando Magic	Basketball	NBA	Kia Center	0	1989
Jacksonville Jaguars	Football	NFL	EverBank Stadium	0	1993
Miami Dolphins	Football	NFL	Hard Rock Stadium	2 (1972, 1973)	1965
Tampa Bay Buccaneers	Football	NFL	Raymond James Stadium	2 (2002, 2020)	1976
Florida Panthers	Ice hockey	NHL	Amerant Bank Arena	2 (2024, 2025)	1993
Tampa Bay Lightning	Ice hockey	NHL	Benchmark International Arena	3 (2004, 2020, 2021)	1992
Inter Miami CF	Soccer	MLS	Nu Stadium	1 (2025)	2018
Orlando City SC	Soccer	MLS	Inter.co Stadium		2013
Fort Lauderdale United FC	Soccer	USLS	BeyondBancard Field		2024
Orlando Pride	Soccer	NWSL	Inter.co Stadium	1 (2024)	2016
Tampa Bay Rowdies	Soccer	USL	Al Lang Stadium	2 (1975, 2012)	1975-1993 and 2010
Sporting Club Jacksonville	Soccer	USL	Hodges Stadium		2025
Tampa Bay Sun FC	Soccer	USLS	Riverfront Stadium	1 (2025)	2024
Tampa Bay Storm*	Football	AFL	Amalie Arena	5 (1991, 1993, 1995, 1996, 2003)	1991-2017
Miami Fusion*	Soccer	MLS	Lockhart Stadium		1997
Tampa Bay Mutiny*	Soccer	MLS	Raymond James Stadium		1996
Orlando Miracle*	Basketball	WNBA	TD Waterhouse Centre		1999
Miami Sol*	Basketball	WNBA	American Airlines Arena		2000

*Team has folded or relocated

=== Spring training ===
Florida is the traditional home for Major League Baseball spring training, with teams informally organized into the "Grapefruit League." As of 2022, Florida hosts the following major league teams for spring training:

Club	Location
Atlanta Braves	North Port
Baltimore Orioles	Sarasota
Boston Red Sox	Fort Myers
Detroit Tigers	Lakeland
Houston Astros	West Palm Beach
Miami Marlins	Jupiter
Minnesota Twins	Fort Myers
New York Mets	Port St. Lucie
New York Yankees	Tampa
Philadelphia Phillies	Clearwater
Pittsburgh Pirates	Bradenton
St. Louis Cardinals	Jupiter
Tampa Bay Rays	Port Charlotte
Toronto Blue Jays	Dunedin
Washington Nationals	West Palm Beach

== Individual sports ==
Golf, tennis and auto racing are popular in Florida.

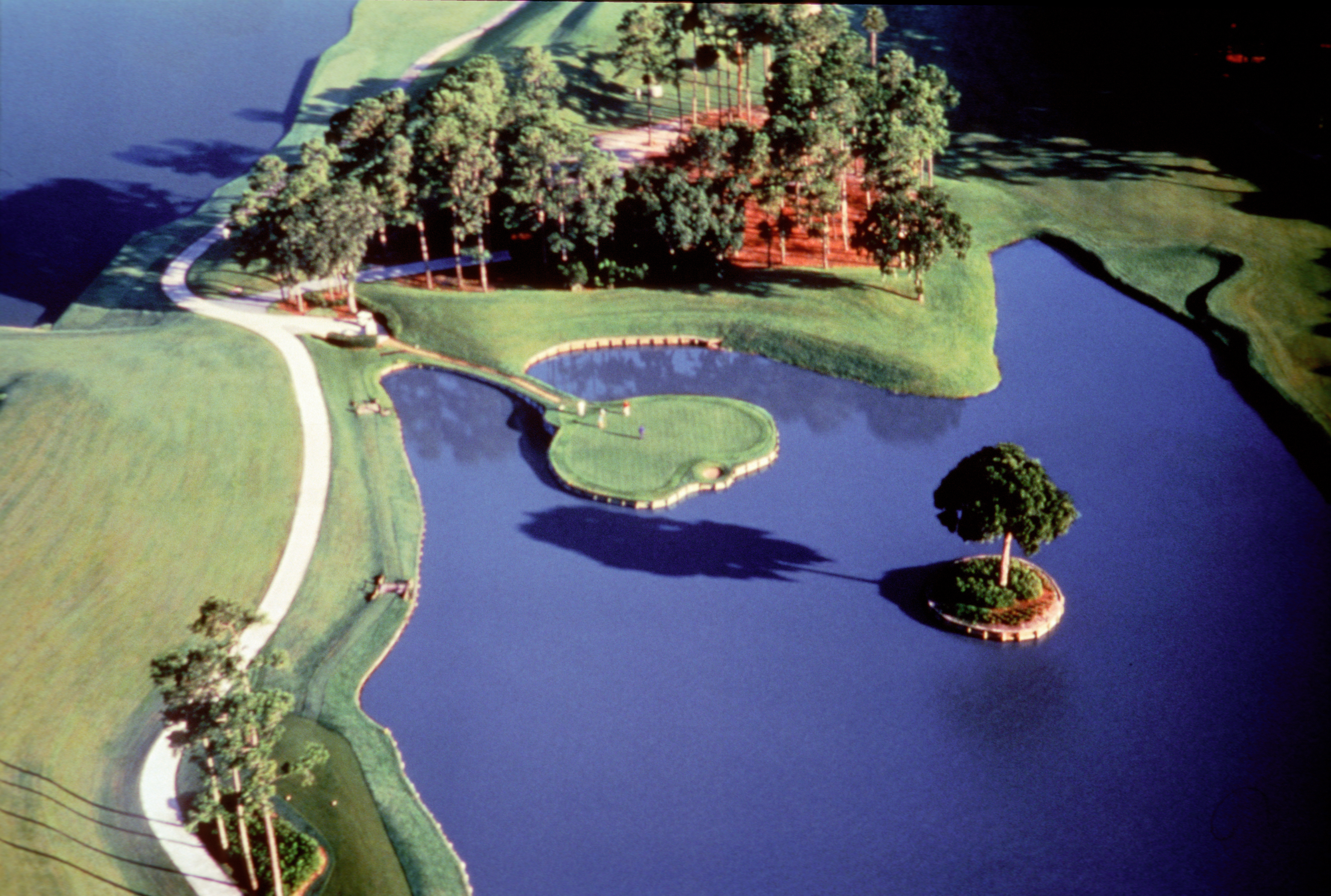
"Island Green" par-3 17th hole at The Players Championship.

The Professional Golfers Association of America (PGA), the trade association for club professionals which organizes major championships for men and women and also co-organizes the biennial Ryder Cup, was long based in Palm Beach Gardens before moving its headquarters to Frisco, Texas in 2022. The PGA Tour, which has been separate from the PGA of America since 1968, has its home base in Ponte Vedra Beach, while the LPGA is headquartered in Daytona Beach. The Players Championship, sometimes referred to as the fifth (men's) major, is held every year near Jacksonville. Additionally, the WGC Championship, Arnold Palmer Invitational, Honda Classic and Valspar Championship are PGA Tour events.

In tennis, the Miami Open is an ATP Tour Masters 1000 and WTA Premier Mandatory event. The Delray Beach International Tennis Championships is an ATP World Tour 250 event.

NASCAR (headquartered in Daytona Beach) begins all three of its major auto racing series in Florida at Daytona International Speedway in February, featuring the Daytona 500, and ends all three Series in November at Homestead-Miami Speedway. Daytona also has the Coke Zero 400 NASCAR race weekend around Independence Day in July. The 24 Hours of Daytona is one of the world's most prestigious endurance auto races. The Grand Prix of St. Petersburg and Grand Prix of Miami have held IndyCar races as well.

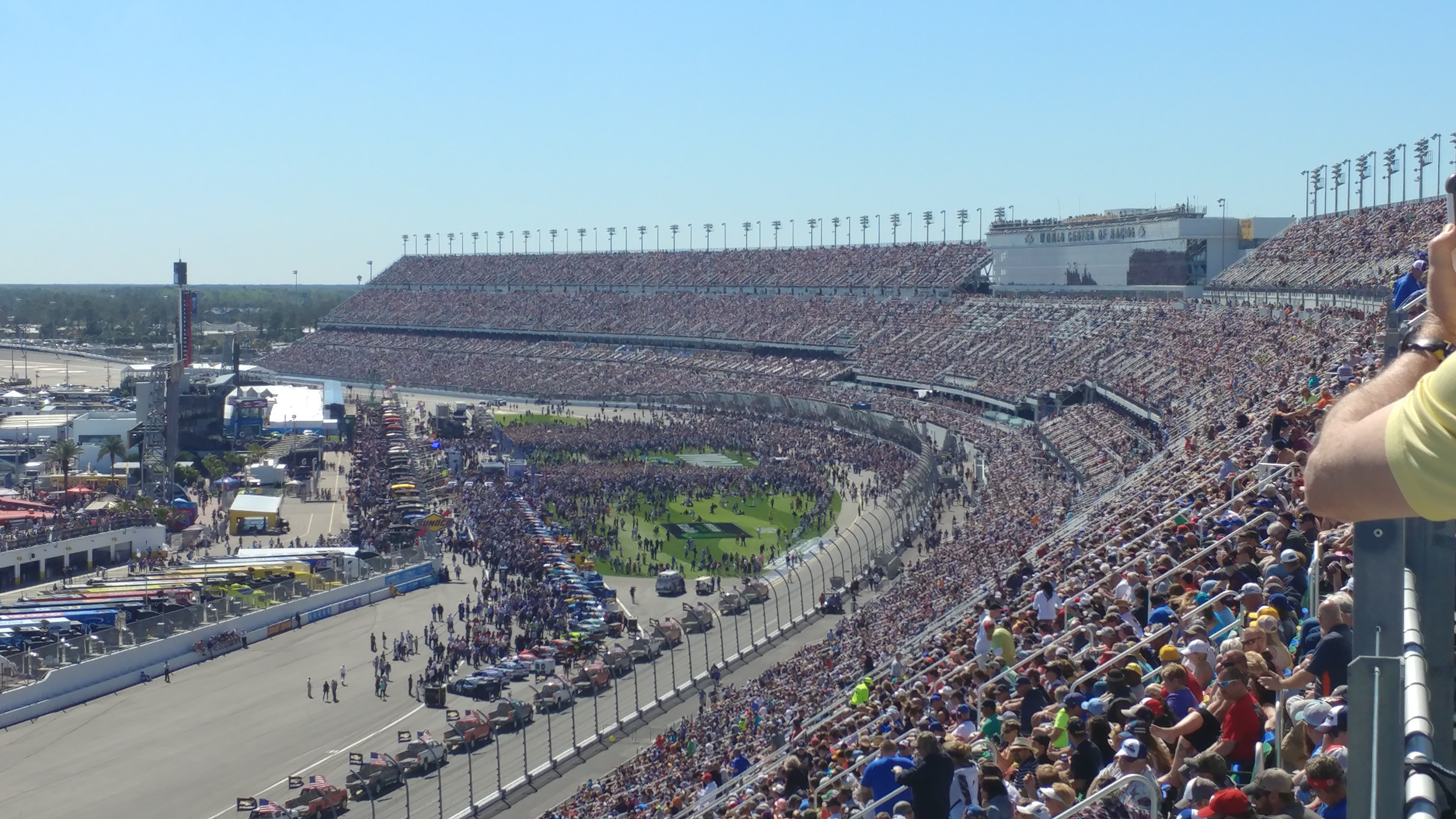
Daytona International Speedway

=== Auto racing tracks ===
- Daytona International Speedway
- Homestead-Miami Speedway
- Citrus County Speedway
- Volusia Speedway Park
- East Bay Raceway Park
- Showtime Speedway
- Bubba Raceway Park
- North Florida Speedway
- Lake City Speedway
- Freedom Factory
- Hendy County Motorsports Park
- Southern Raceway
- Sebring Raceway
- Florida International Rally and Motorsports Park
- Palm Beach International Raceway
- Streets of St. Petersburg
- Walt Disney World Speedway (demolished)
- New Smyrna Speedway
- Five Flags Speedway
- Gainesville Raceway

== Minor league, semi-pro and other pro teams ==
Club	Sport	League	Venue	Championships (Years)
Orlando Guardians (folded with league joint)	American football	XFL	Camping World Stadium	0
Orlando Storm	American football	UFL	Inter&Co Stadium	0
Jacksonville Jumbo Shrimp	Baseball	MiLB, International League	121 Financial Ballpark	7 (1968, 1996, 2001, 2005, 2009, 2010, 2025)
Pensacola Blue Wahoos	Baseball	MiLB, Southern League	Pensacola Bayfront Stadium	0
Bradenton Marauders	Baseball	MiLB, Florida State League	McKechnie Field	1 (2016)
Clearwater Threshers	Baseball	MiLB, Florida State League	Spectrum Field	1 (2007)
Daytona Tortugas	Baseball	MiLB, Florida State League	Jackie Robinson Ballpark	3 (1995, 2004, 2008)
Dunedin Blue Jays	Baseball	MiLB, Florida State League	Knology Park	0
Fort Myers Mighty Mussels	Baseball	MiLB, Florida State League	Hammond Stadium	7 (1969, 1970, 1971, 1972, 1978, 2018, 2018)
Jupiter Hammerheads	Baseball	MiLB, Florida State League	Roger Dean Stadium	0
Lakeland Flying Tigers	Baseball	MiLB, Florida State League	Joker Marchant Stadium	3 (1976, 1977, 1992)
Palm Beach Cardinals	Baseball	MiLB, Florida State League	Roger Dean Stadium	1 (2005)
St. Lucie Mets	Baseball	MiLB, Florida State League	Clover Park	5 (1988, 1996, 1998, 2003, 2006)
Tampa Tarpons	Baseball	MiLB, Florida State League	George M. Steinbrenner Field	5 (1994, 2001, 2004, 2009, 2010)
Osceola Magic	Basketball	NBA G League	Silver Spurs Arena	1 (2021 as Lakeland Magic)
Florida Flight	Basketball	Florida Basketball Association	RDV Sportsplex	1 (2019)
Clermont Crocs	Basketball	American Basketball Association; Florida Basketball Association	RDV Sportsplex	1 (2021)
Jacksonville Giants	Basketball	American Basketball Association	VyStar Veterans Memorial Arena	3 (2012, 2013, 2016)
Miami Midnites	Basketball	American Basketball Association; Florida Basketball Association	David Posnack Jewish Community Center	3 (2014, 2015, 2016 in the FBA)
Florida Everblades	Ice hockey	ECHL	Hertz Arena	2 (2012, 2022)
Jacksonville Icemen	Ice hockey	ECHL	VyStar Veterans Memorial Arena	0
Orlando Solar Bears	Ice hockey	ECHL	Amway Center	0
Pensacola Ice Flyers	Ice hockey	SPHL	Pensacola Civic Center	3 (2013, 2014, 2016)
Jacksonville Sharks	Indoor football	Indoor Football League	VyStar Veterans Memorial Arena	3 (2011, 2017, 2019, 2023)
Orlando Predators	Indoor football	National Arena League	Amway Center	0
Florida Tropics SC	Indoor soccer	Major Arena Soccer League	RP Funding Center	0
Jacksonville Axemen	Rugby League	USA Rugby League	Hodges Stadium	2 (2010, 2012)
Lakeland Renegades	Rugby league	USA Rugby League	All Saints Academy	0
Southwest Florida Copperheads	Rugby league	USA Rugby League	Lehigh Senior High School	0
Tampa Mayhem	Rugby league	USA Rugby League	Tampa Catholic High School	0
Miami FC	Soccer	USL Championship	Pitbull Stadium	3 (2018 & 2019 in NPSL), (2019 in NISA)
Tampa Bay Rowdies	Soccer	USL Championship	Al Lang Stadium	2 (1975 and 2012 in NASL)
FC Naples	Soccer	USL League One	Paradise Coast Sports Complex	0
Inter Miami CF II	Soccer	MLS Next Pro	Chase Stadium	0
Club de Lyon	Soccer	National Independent Soccer Association	Daytona Stadium	0
Beaches FC	Soccer	National Premier Soccer League		0
Central Florida Panthers SC	Soccer	National Premier Soccer League	Showalter Field	0
Jacksonville Armada FC	Soccer	National Premier Soccer League	Hodges Stadium	0
Miami United FC	Soccer	National Premier Soccer League		0
Naples United FC	Soccer	National Premier Soccer League		0
Storm FC	Soccer	National Premier Soccer League		0
IMG Academy Bradenton	Soccer	USL League Two		0
Lakeland Tropics	Soccer	USL League Two	Bryant Stadium	0
FC Miami City	Soccer	USL League Two		0
North County United	Soccer	USL League Two		0
Next Academy Palm Beach	Soccer	USL League Two		0
SIMA Águilas	Soccer	USL League Two		0
The Villages SC	Soccer	USL League Two		0
Weston FC	Soccer	USL League Two		0
Boca Raton FC	Soccer	United Premier Soccer League	Lynn University	1 (2015 in APSL)
Fort Lauderdale Herd BC	Basketball	National Basketball League - US	Joseph C. Carter Center	0

== College sports ==
School	Nickname	City	Affiliation	Conference	National Championships
ASA College Miami	Silver Storm	Miami	NJCAA DI	Southern Conference	
Ave Maria University	Gyrenes	Ave Maria	NAIA	The Sun Conference	
Barry University	Buccaneers	Miami Shores	NCAA DII	Sunshine State Conference	
Beacon College	Blazers	Leesburg	USCAA DI	New South Athletic Conference	
Bethune–Cookman University	Wildcats	Daytona Beach	NCAA DI	Southwestern Athletic Conference	0
Broward College	Seahawks	Davie	NJCAA DI	Southern Conference	
Chipola College	Indians	Marianna	NJCAA DI	Panhandle Conference	
Clearwater Christian College	Cougars	Clearwater	NCCAA DII	School closed	17
College of Central Florida	Patriots	Ocala	NJCAA DI	Mid-Florida Conference	
Daytona State College	Falcons	Daytona Beach	NJCAA DI	Mid-Florida Conference	
Eastern Florida State College	Titans	Melbourne	NJCAA DI	Southern Conference	
Eckerd College	Tritons	St. Petersburg	NCAA DII	Sunshine State Conference	
Edward Waters University	Tigers	Jacksonville	NCAA DII	Southern Intercollegiate Athletic Conference	
Embry-Riddle Aeronautical University	Eagles	Daytona Beach	NCAA DII	Sunshine State Conference	19
Florida International University (FIU)	Panthers	Miami (Note: Mailing address is Miami, but the campus and all athletic venues are in unincorporated Miami-Dade County.)	NCAA DI	Conference USA	4
Flagler College	Saints	St. Augustine	NCAA DII	Peach Belt Conference	
University of Florida	Gators	Gainesville	NCAA DI	Southeastern Conference	39
Florida A&M University	Rattlers	Tallahassee	NCAA DI	Southwestern Athletic Conference	25
Florida Atlantic University	Owls	Boca Raton	NCAA DI	American Conference	2
Florida College	Falcons	Temple Terrace	NAIA; USCAA DI	Southern States Athletic Conference	23
Florida Gulf Coast University	Eagles	Fort Myers (Note: Mailing address is Fort Myers, but the campus and all athletic venues are in unincorporated Lee County.)	NCAA DI	Atlantic Sun Conference	0
Florida Memorial University	Lions	Miami Gardens	NAIA	The Sun Conference	
Florida National University	Conquistadors	Hialeah	USCAA DI		
Florida Southern College	Moccasins	Lakeland	NCAA DII	Sunshine State Conference	30
Florida SouthWestern State College	Buccaneers	Fort Myers	NJCAA DI	Southern Conference	
Florida State University	Seminoles	Tallahassee	NCAA DI	Atlantic Coast Conference	15
Florida State College at Jacksonville	Bluewave	Jacksonville	NJCAA DI	Mid-Florida Conference	
Florida Institute of Technology (Florida Tach)	Panthers	Melbourne	NCAA DII	Sunshine State Conference	2
Gulf Coast State College	Commodores	Panama City	NJCAA DI	Panhandle Conference	4
Hillsborough Community College	Hawks	Tampa	NJCAA DI	Suncoast Conference	
Indian River State College	Pioneers	Fort Pierce	NJCAA DI	Southern Conference	
Jacksonville University	Dolphins	Jacksonville	NCAA DI	Atlantic Sun Conference	0
Johnson & Wales University	Wildcats	North Miami	NAIA	The Sun Conference	
Johnson University Florida	Suns	Kissimmee	NCCAA DII	School closed	
Keiser University	Seahawks	West Palm Beach	NAIA	The Sun Conference	
Lake-Sumter State College	Lakehawks	Leesburg	NJCAA DI	Mid-Florida Conference	
Lynn University	Fighting Knights	Boca Raton	NCAA DII	Sunshine State Conference	22
University of Miami	Hurricanes	Coral Gables (Note: The campus and most athletic venues are in Coral Gables, but the football team plays in Miami Gardens.)	NCAA DI	Atlantic Coast Conference	21
Miami Dade College	Sharks	Miami	NJCAA DI	Southern Conference	
University of North Florida	Ospreys	Jacksonville	NCAA DI	Atlantic Sun Conference	4
Northwest Florida State College	Raiders	Niceville	NJCAA DI	Panhandle Conference	
Nova Southeastern University	Sharks	Fort Lauderdale	NCAA DII	Sunshine State Conference	11
Palm Beach Atlantic University	Sailfish	West Palm Beach	NCAA DII	Sunshine State Conference	0
Palm Beach State College	Panthers	Lake Worth	NJCAA DI	Southern Conference	
Pasco–Hernando State College	Conquistadors	New Port Richey	NJCAA DII		
Pensacola Christian College	Eagles	Pensacola	NCCAA DII		10
Pensacola State College	Pirates	Pensacola	NJCAA DI	Panhandle Conference	
Polk State College	Eagles	Winter Haven	NJCAA DI	Suncoast Conference	
Rollins College	Tars	Winter Park	NCAA DII	Sunshine State Conference	22
St. Johns River State College	Vikings	Palatka	NJCAA DI	Mid-Florida Conference	
Saint Leo University	Lions	St. Leo	NCAA DII	Sunshine State Conference	0
St. Petersburg College	Titans	St. Petersburg	NJCAA DI	Suncoast Conference	
Saint Thomas University	Bobcats	Miami Gardens	NAIA	The Sun Conference	
Santa Fe College	Saints	Gainesville	NJCAA DI	Mid-Florida Conference	
Seminole State College of Florida	Raiders	Sanford	NJCAA DI	Mid-Florida Conference	
University of South Florida	Bulls	Tampa	NCAA DI	American Conference	6
South Florida State College	Panthers	Avon Park	NJCAA DI	Suncoast Conference	
Southeastern University	Fire	Lakeland	NAIA, NCCAA DI	The Sun Conference	4
State College of Florida, Manatee-Sarasota	Manatees	Bradenton	NJCAA DI	Suncoast Conference	13
Stetson University	Hatters	DeLand	NCAA DI	Atlantic Sun Conference	0
Tallahassee Community College	Eagles	Tallahassee	NJCAA DI	Panhandle Conference	
University of Tampa	Spartans	Tampa	NCAA DII	Sunshine State Conference	18
Trinity Baptist College	Eagles	Jacksonville	NCCAA DII		
Trinity College (Florida)	Tigers	New Port Richey	USCAA DII		
University of Central Florida (UCF)	Knights	Orlando (Note: Mailing address is Orlando, but the campus and all athletic venues are in unincorporated Orange County.)	NCAA DI	Big 12 Conference	2
Warner University	Royals	Lake Wales	NAIA, NCCAA DI	The Sun Conference	
Webber International University	Warriors	Babson Park	NAIA	The Sun Conference	0
University of West Florida	Argonauts	Pensacola	NCAA DII	Gulf South Conference	8

== See also ==
- Sports in Florida
