= Bill Hurst =

American baseball player (born 1970)

- Pitcher
- Born: April 28, 1970 (age 56); Miami Beach, Florida, U.S.
- Batted: Right Threw: Right

MLB debut
- September 18, 1996, for the Florida Marlins

Last MLB appearance
- September 28, 1996, for the Florida Marlins

MLB statistics
- Games pitched: 0
- Earned run average: 0.00
- Strikeouts: 1
- Stats at Baseball Reference

Teams
- Florida Marlins (1996)

William Hansel Hurst (born April 28, 1970) is an American former Major League Baseball player. He played for Palmetto High School in Miami and for Central Florida Community College in Ocala.

== Playing in the MLB ==
He was drafted by the St. Louis Cardinals in the 20th round of the 1989 amateur entry draft. On December 10, 1992, he was released by the Cardinals. On March 12, 1995, he signed as a free agent with the Florida Marlins.

He started 1996 by saving 30 games with a 2.20 ERA for the Portland Sea Dogs of the Eastern League. He debuted in the majors on September 18, 1996. Hurst pitched in two games for the Florida Marlins in the 1996 season. He pitched two innings and had one strike out, with a walk, and did not allow a run to score. Hurst is Jewish.
