= John Crawford (author) =

- Born: Palatka, Florida
- Education: Associate of Arts from Tallahassee Community College; Bachelor of Arts in Anthropology, Florida State University, Master of Fine Arts, Florida State University
- Occupations: Writer, Soldier
- Writing career
- Language: English
- Genres: Memoir; War
- Notable work: The Last True Story I'll Ever Tell

SPC John Crawford is an American Iraq War veteran and writer originally from Palatka, Florida known for his 2005 bestselling memoir The Last True Story I'll Ever Tell, about his tour in Iraq. In the early 2000s, Crawford, already an Army veteran, had enlisted in the Army National Guard to help pay for his college tuition. Because he already held an associate degree from Tallahassee Community College, he was assigned the rank of Specialist.

In 2002, John Crawford was recently married and close to earning a degree in Anthropology from Florida State University. In 2003, his National Guard unit was deployed to Kuwait and later Iraq during the early stages of the Iraq War. "I was planning to enroll in a master's program at FSU," he says. "Instead I took a vacation to Iraq." Crawford describes his experiences as having created a "new level of accountability," and remarked that when he told his fellow soldiers he was writing a memoir about his experience, all of them "wanted to know if I was writing a 'super liberal' book." Crawford later plans to travel to Afghanistan to write an account of the current war on terror in the country from a civilian perspective. Crawford has made appearances on National Public Radio as well as C-SPAN and The Daily Show.
