= NJCAA Region 8 =

College athletic conference in the United States

Region 8 of the National Junior College Athletic Association (NJCAA) comprises at least 26 community and state colleges from the Florida college system. All members of the NJCAA Region 8 are Division I, excluding Pasco–Hernando State College, which is in Division II. The college athletic programs are collectively administered by the Florida College System Activities Association (FCSAA), with the exception of ASA College of Miami, which was a private institution.

== Members ==
=== Mid-Florida Conference ===
- Daytona State College
- Florida State College at Jacksonville
- College of Central Florida
- Lake-Sumter State College
- Santa Fe College
- St. Johns River State College
- Seminole State College

=== Panhandle Conference ===
- Chipola College
- Gulf Coast State College
- Northwest Florida State College
- Pensacola State College
- Tallahassee Community College

=== Southern Conference ===
- Eastern Florida State College
- Miami Dade College
- Palm Beach State College
- Indian River State College

=== Suncoast Conference ===
- St. Petersburg College
- Polk State College
- Hillsborough Community College
- State College of Florida, Manatee–Sarasota
- Florida SouthWestern State College (formerly Edison Community College)
- South Florida State College

=== Independent ===
- Pasco–Hernando State College
- ASA College of Miami
- The College of the Florida Keys

=== Former Members ===
- Broward College
- Florida Gateway College (formerly Lake City Community College)
- North Florida Community College
- Valencia College (formerly Valencia Community College)

== See also ==
- National Junior College Athletic Association (NJCAA)
- Florida College System Activities Association (FCSAA - the governing body of NJCAA Region 8)
- Florida College System
- NJCAA Region 23
