= Florida College System Activities Association =

Athletics governing organization in Tallahassee, Florida, U.S.

Coordinates: 30°26′25.8″N 84°16′52.7″W

Florida College System Activities Association Incorporated
- Abbreviation: FCSAA
- Predecessor: Florida Community College Activities Association
- Formation: March 24, 1975; 51 years ago
- Type: Nonprofit corporation
- Tax ID no.: 59-6193023; tax status: §501(c)(3)
- Legal status: Active
- Location: 113 East College Avenue Tallahassee, Florida, U.S. 32301
- Formerly called: Florida State College Activities Association

Florida College System Activities Association Incorporated (FCSAA) is the governing body for all extracurricular activities of the member schools of the Florida College System. Activities include athletics, Brain Bowl, forensics, music, publications, theater, and student government. The athletic programs fall under The NJCAA Region 8. There are currently 28 schools in the FCSAA. In the 1960s, twelve historically black institutions were merged into other colleges within their districts, with full integration being achieved by 1966.

== Schools ==
- Broward College
- Chipola College
- College of Central Florida
- Daytona State College
- Eastern Florida State College
- Florida Gateway College
- Florida Keys Community College
- Florida SouthWestern State College
- Florida State College at Jacksonville
- Gulf Coast State College
- Hillsborough Community College
- Indian River State College
- Lake–Sumter State College
- Miami Dade College
- North Florida Community College
- Northwest Florida State College
- Palm Beach State College
- Pasco–Hernando State College
- Pensacola State College
- Polk State College
- Santa Fe College
- Seminole State College of Florida
- South Florida State College
- St. Johns River State College
- St. Petersburg College
- State College of Florida, Manatee-Sarasota
- Tallahassee Community College
- Valencia College

== Student Government ==
FCSAA's student government division is known as the Florida College System Student Government Association (FCSSGA).

Dealaney Allen is the 2019–2020 President of the FCSSGA. In this role, Allen and her executive board represent the one million students at Florida State and Community colleges before the Florida Legislature.

== See also ==
- Florida Student Association, Inc.
- National Junior College Athletic Association
