= Hillsborough College =

Public college in Hillsborough County, Florida, US

Coordinates: 28°01′36″N 82°06′13″W

- Hillsborough College logo
- Former name: Hillsborough Community College (1968-2025)
- Motto: We'll Get You There
- Type: Public community college
- Established: 1968; 58 years ago
- Parent institution: Florida College System
- Endowment: $7.6 million (2020)
- President: Ken Atwater
- Students: 43,000
- Location: Hillsborough County, Florida, United States
- Nickname: Hawks
- Sporting affiliations: NJCAA
- Website: www.hcfl.edu

Hillsborough College (HC), formerly known as Hillsborough Community College, is a public community college in Hillsborough County, Florida, United States. It is part of the Florida College System.

== History ==
Hillsborough College was one of the last community colleges to be created in Florida, founded in 1968. Only Pasco–Hernando State College, out of the 28-school Florida College system, was founded later.

In January 2008 the school opened its first residence hall, Hawk's Landing, named after the school mascot. This marks HC as one of the few community colleges with its own residence hall.

Hillsborough Community College began offering 4-year degrees in 2022. On July 1, 2025, HCC announced that it will undergo a rebrand, dropping "community" from its name in the process to become Hillsborough College. HC was the last school within the Florida College System to use "community" in its name.

On January 20, 2026, there was vote by the college's board of trustees to allow for the Tampa Bay Rays to develop the Dale Mabry campus into a sports complex including the a new stadium for the team. The trustees discussed a nonbinding memorandum of understanding (MOU) to outline key terms and conditions for any project agreement. "The MOU does not require the College to do the Project, and it can be terminated by the Board at any time," the agenda reads. "If the MOU is approved, the Rays and the College will begin negotiating and drafting Project agreements for the Board’s review approval at a future meeting." The board of trustees approved the initial step to begin negotiating this project on the site.

== Campus ==
The college has five campuses located throughout the county. Locations include: Brandon, Dale Mabry, Plant City, Ybor City, and South Shore (on the south shore of Tampa Bay in Ruskin); with the Dale Mabry campus being the largest. There are also instructional centers at MacDill Air Force Base (South Tampa/aligned with the Plant City Campus) and at the Regent (Riverview) aligned with the Brandon Campus. Administrative offices and headquarters are located on Davis Islands, near downtown Tampa. HC has over 80 campus clubs, groups and organizations available.

== Academics ==
HC has grown to include over 43,000 students. In 2010, HC ranked 8th in the state and 20th in the nation in total number of associate degrees produced. HC houses the Honors Institute.

== Athletics ==
HC participates in the Suncoast Conference within Division I of NJCAA Region VIII within the Florida State College Activities Association (FSCAA). Sports include men's baseball and basketball, and women's basketball, softball, tennis and volleyball. The school's nickname is the Hawks. The school's competitions are broadcast on both the school's athletic site and the school radio station WMNF 88.5 HD4. Basketball is played at the Dale Mabry campus.

In 2026, the Tampa Bay Rays’ new stadium hasn’t broke ground yet, but is expected to be built by 2029.

== Notable people ==
=== Alumni ===
- Geoffrey Giuliano, author and actor
- Colton Gordon, professional baseball player
- Garry Hancock, professional baseball player
- Hulk Hogan (Terry Bollea), professional wrestler
- Othello Hunter, professional basketball player
- Bobby Mosebach, professional baseball player
- Jeffrey Webb, professional soccer official
- Chad Zerbe, professional baseball player

=== Faculty ===
- Percival Davis, professor of life science, young earth creationist, and activist in the intelligent design movement
