= Southern Conference (NJCAA) =

College athletic conference in the United States

- Association: NJCAA
- Commissioner: John Schultz
- Sports fielded: 13; men's: 5; women's: 8
- Division: Region 8
- No. of teams: 5
- Region: Florida

The Southern Conference is a conference within the National Junior College Athletic Association (NJCAA) Region 8. The conference consists of one private and five state and colleges located in Florida.

== Members ==
Member institutions are:

Institution	Nickname	Location
Broward College	Seahawks	Fort Lauderdale
Eastern Florida State College	Titans	Cocoa
Indian River State College	Pioneers	Fort Pierce
Miami Dade College	Sharks	Miami
Palm Beach State College	Panthers	Lake Worth

== Former members ==
- ASA College Miami, Avengers, ceased operations March 2023.

== See also ==
- Florida State College Activities Association (FCSAA), the governing body of NJCAA Region 8
- Mid-Florida Conference, also in Region 8
- Panhandle Conference, also in Region 8
- Suncoast Conference, also in Region 8
