= Suncoast Conference =

- Association: NJCAA
- Founded: 1981
- Sports fielded: 18 (10 men's, 8 women's)
- Division: Region 8
- No. of teams: 4
- Region: Florida

The Suncoast Conference (SCC), hosted by the National Junior College Athletic Association (NJCAA), is one of four conferences within Region 8 of the NJCAA. It is composed of four state colleges within the state of Florida, and is administered by the Florida State College Activities Association (FCSAA). Conference championships are held in most sports and individuals can be named to All-Conference and All-Academic teams.

== Members ==
=== Current members ===
- Hillsborough Community College
- Florida SouthWestern State College
- Polk State College
- St. Petersburg College
- State College of Florida, Manatee–Sarasota
- South Florida State College

=== Former members ===
- Florida College
- Pasco–Hernando State College

== See also ==
- Florida State College Activities Association (FCSAA), the governing body of NJCAA Region 8
- Mid-Florida Conference, also in Region 8
- Panhandle Conference, also in Region 8
- Southern Conference, also in Region 8
