= Mid-Florida Conference =

College athletic conference in the United States

- Association: NJCAA
- Commissioner: John Schultz
- Sports fielded: 13; men's: 5; women's: 8
- Division: Region 8
- No. of teams: 7
- Region: Florida

The Mid–Florida Conference is a conference within the National Junior College Athletic Association (NJCAA) Region 8. The conference consists of seven state colleges located in Florida.

== Members ==
Member institutions are:

- Seminole State College of Florida
- St. Johns River State College
- College of Central Florida
- Daytona State College
- Florida State College at Jacksonville
- Lake-Sumter State College
- Santa Fe College

== See also ==
- Florida College System Activities Association (FCSAA), the governing body of NJCAA Region 8
- Panhandle Conference, also in Region 8
- Southern Conference, also in Region 8
- Suncoast Conference, also in Region 8
