= College of Central Florida =

Public college in Florida, United States

Coordinates: 29.1654329°N 82.1750359°W

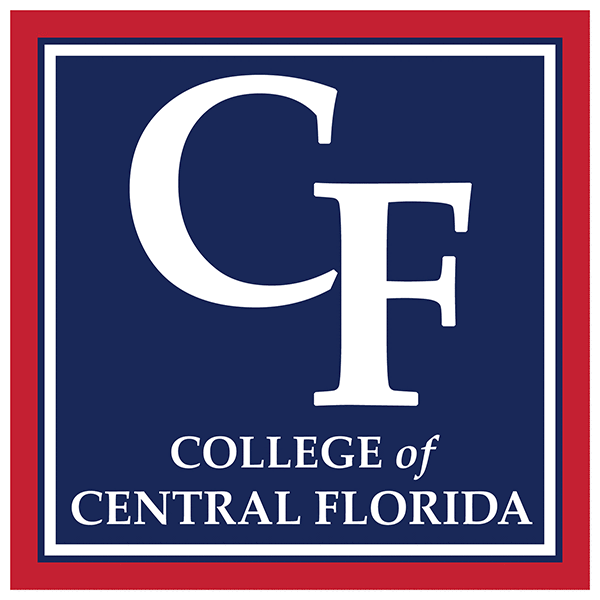
- Former names: Central Florida Community College; Central Florida Junior College; Hampton Junior College
- Type: Public college
- Established: 1957; 69 years ago
- Parent institution: Florida College System
- Endowment: $118 million (2025)
- President: James Henningsen
- Administrative staff: 402 (as of 2017)
- Students: 10,854 (2017-2018)
- Location: Ocala, Florida, U.S.
- Nickname: Patriots
- Sporting affiliations: NJCAA Region 8 Mid-Florida Conference
- Website: www.cf.edu

The College of Central Florida (CF) is a public college with campuses in Marion, Citrus, and Levy counties in the U.S. state of Florida. It is part of the Florida College System and was founded in 1957 as Central Florida Junior College. CF has grown to span three counties and include the Appleton Museum of Art and Vintage Farm in Ocala.

The college is accredited by the Southern Association of Colleges and Schools Commission on Colleges to award baccalaureate, Associate in Arts, and Associate in Science degrees as well as certificates. The college started offering bachelor's degree programs in 2010.

== History ==
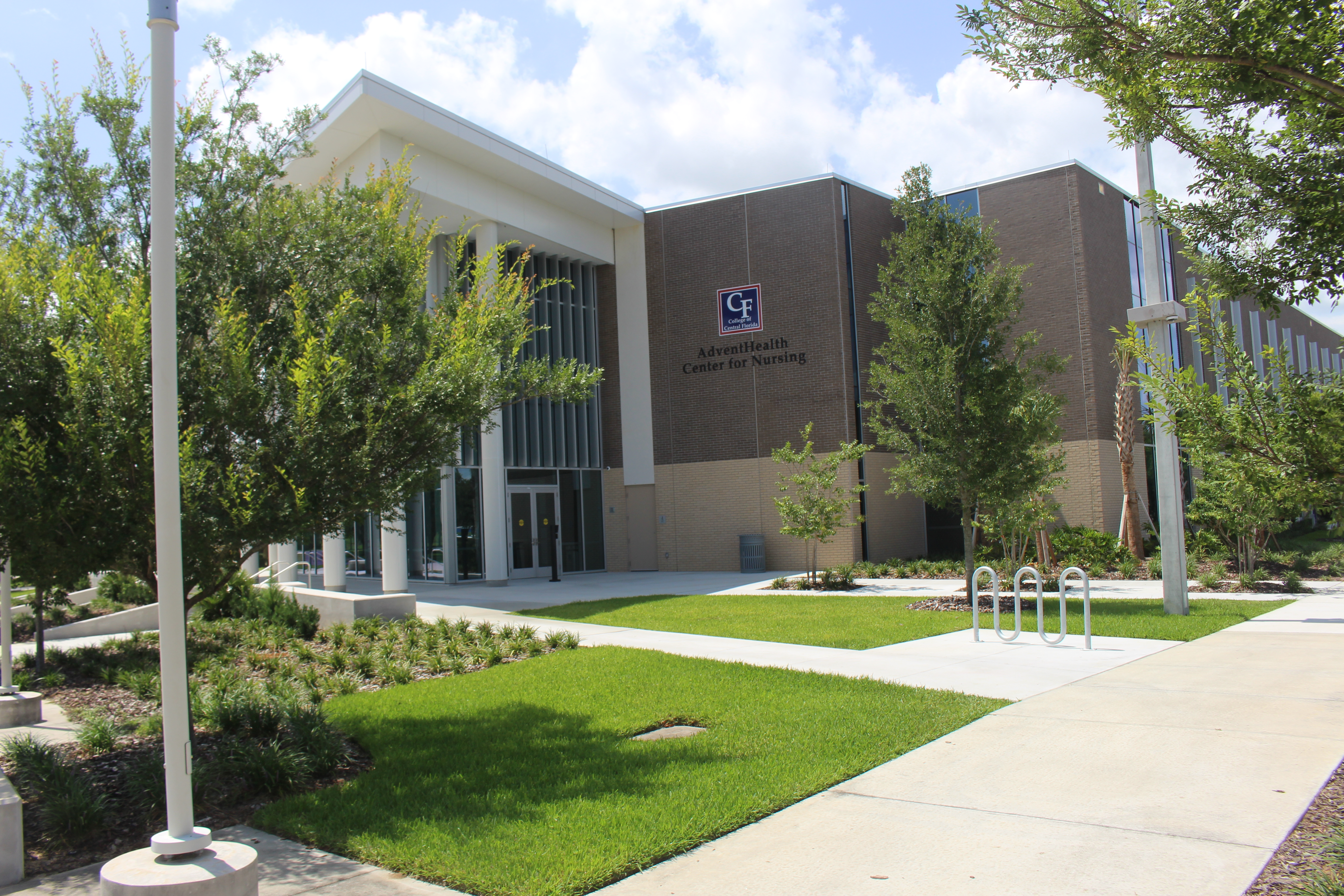
AdventHealth Center for Nursing

Central Florida Junior College was established in 1957 to serve Citrus, Levy and Marion counties in Florida. In 1958 classes began, with 320 students using temporary facilities at the Marion County Vocational School. The first president was Kenneth Williams. The Ocala campus was originally established on 60 acres (24 ha) of land donated by Atlantic Realty and Investment Company and the city of Ocala. It has since grown to 140 acres (57 ha). The first four structures were a science building, a health center, a library and the student center.

Howard Junior College originally opened in 1958 as one of the first black, two-year colleges in the state. Within a couple of years, it was renamed Hampton Junior College in honor of Lee Royal Hampton, the first black dentist in Marion County who was a champion of education. Their first president was William H. Jackson.

HJC and CFCJ merged in 1966. The school changed names again in 1971 to Central Florida Community College to reflect the goal of educating the community.

Retired Tallahassee Community College president Jim Hinson was asked by the Florida Department of Education to serve as interim president to help the struggling CFCC stabilize their finances. On May 25, 2010, CFCC officially changed its name to College of Central Florida. Charles "Chick" Dassance was college president.

James Henningsen is the college president and assumed the position in 2012.

=== Citrus County ===
In 1996, a free-standing campus opened on 88 acres (36 ha) in Lecanto. Over time, an additional 10 acres (4.0 ha) were added to the Wilton Simpson Citrus Campus, and the Citrus Learning and Conference Center opened in fall 2009.

=== Levy County ===
The Jack Wilkinson Levy Campus opened in fall 2017 on Hwy 19 North, replacing the Levy Center located in Chiefland.

=== Hampton Center ===
CF's Hampton Center, which offers health occupation courses and community outreach programs, opened in 1996 on the site of the former Florida State Fire College in West Ocala. In 2004, the facility was completely rebuilt.

=== Appleton museum ===
The college maintained a partnership interest in the Appleton Museum of Art for more than a decade before accepting full responsibility for operations in 2004.

=== Vintage farm ===
The farm was donated in late 2016 and is a few miles from the Ocala campus. The 103 acres includes a large barn and farmhouse and was valued at almost $3 million. The farm is utilized for agricultural education with practical training in Agribusiness and Equine Studies.

== Locations ==
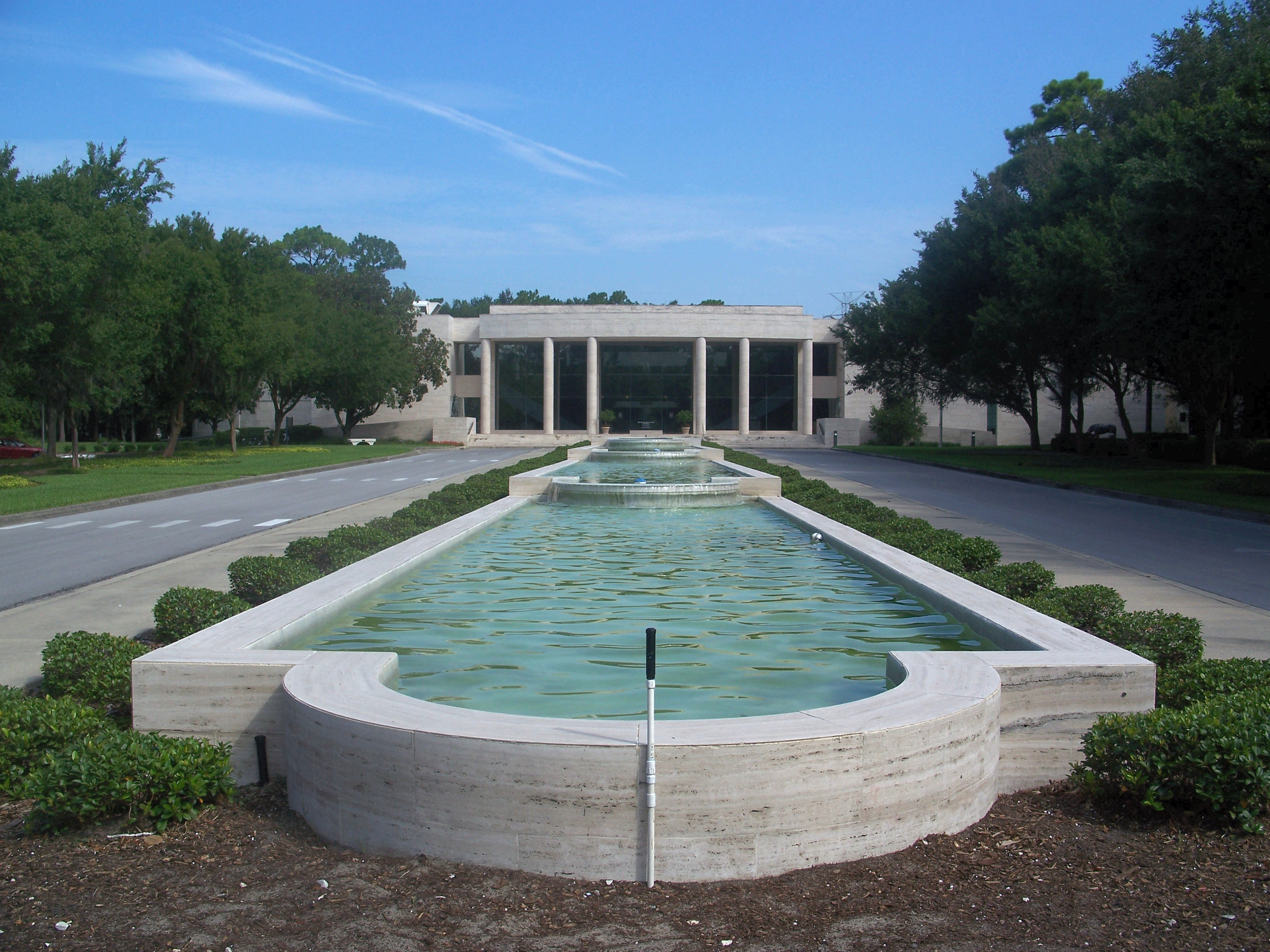
Appleton Museum of Art

The College of Central Florida operates three campuses and three sites in Marion, Citrus, and Levy counties.

=== Campuses ===
- Ocala Campus located at 3001 S.W. College Road, Ocala, FL 34474
- Citrus Campus located at 3800 S. Lecanto Highway, Lecanto, FL 34461
- Jack Wilkinson Levy Campus located at 15390 N.W. Highway 19, Chiefland, FL 32626

=== Sites ===
- Appleton Museum of Art located at 4333 E Silver Springs Boulevard, Ocala, Florida 34470
- Hampton Center located at 1501 W. Silver Springs Boulevard, Ocala FL 34475
- Vintage Farm Campus located at 4020 SE 3rd Ave, Ocala, FL 34480

== Awards and recognition ==
- Ranked among the top 150 colleges in the nation for quality in 2011, 2013 and 2017 in by the Aspen Institute College Excellence program.

== Student profile ==
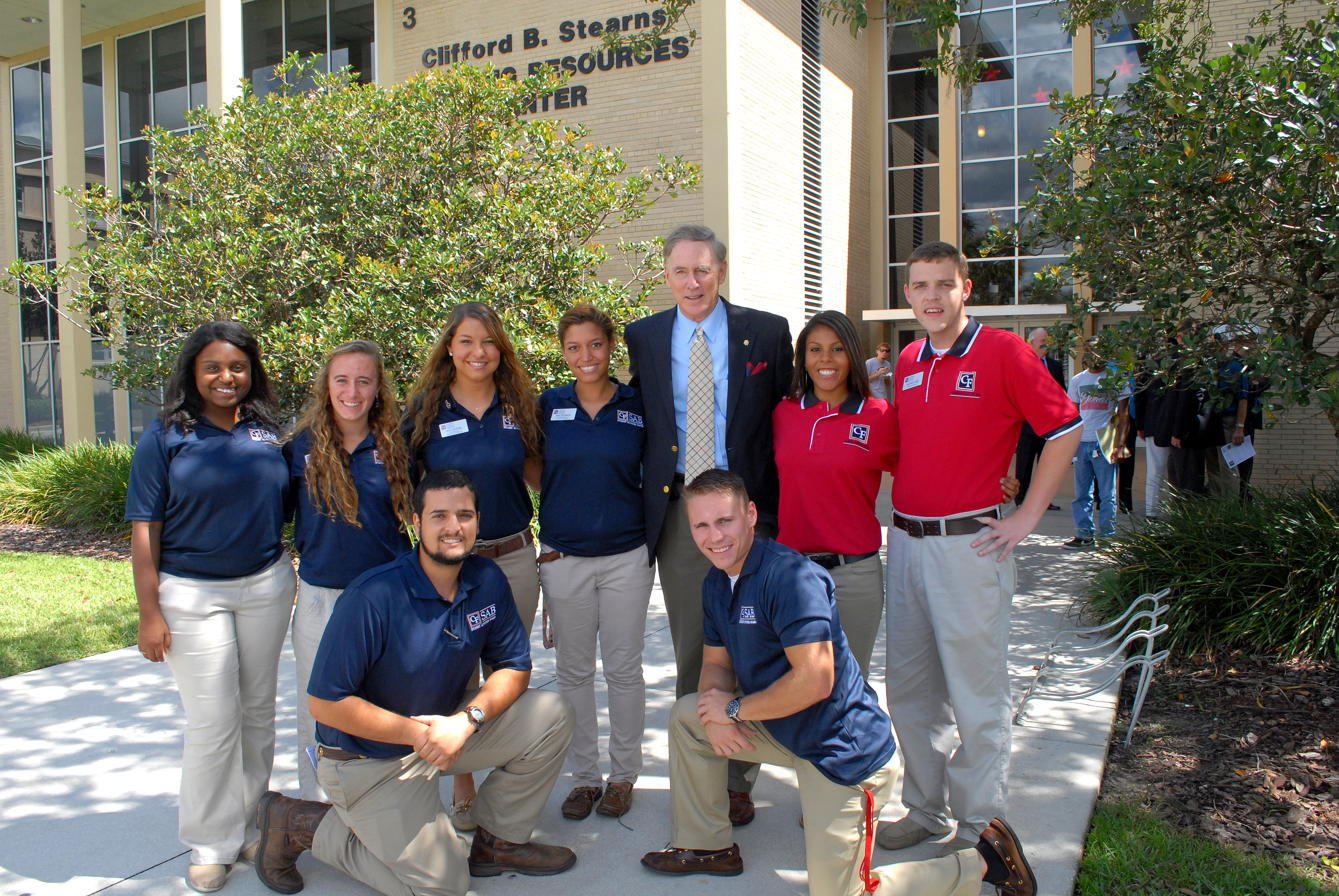
Congressman Cliff Stearns joins students on campus to celebrate Constitution Day.

College-wide unduplicated headcount was 10,854 for the 2017–2018 academic year.

=== Headcount by campus ===
- Ocala Campus: 9,546
- Citrus Campus: 4,264
- Levy Campus: 1,872
- Hampton Center: 151

=== Enrollment by program ===
- Associate in Arts: 63%
- Associate in Science, Associate in Applied Science: 20.8%
- Baccalaureate: 10.1%
- Adult Vocational Certificate: 2.4%
- College Credit Certificate: 1.5%
- Other: 2.2%

=== Student demographics ===
==== Gender ====
- Female: 62.4%
- Male: 37.5%
- Undeclared: 0.1%

==== Age, credit and noncredit ====
- Under 18: 11.5%
- 18-24: 49.0%
- 25-34: 20.8%
- 35-44: 9.3%
- 45 and older: 9.4%

==== Race/ethnicity ====
- White (not of Hispanic origin): 54.7%
- Black (not of Hispanic origin): 14.1%
- Hispanic: 15.6%
- Undeclared: 10.9%
- Asian: 3.1%
- American Indian/Pacific Islanders: 1.6%

== Student life ==
Each of the three CF campuses has its own Student Life organization promoting campus activities and engagement. Collectively, the campuses hold more than 50 student clubs for academic, athletic, social, and service learning opportunities.

== Athletics ==
College of Central Florida fields intercollegiate athletics teams in men's and women's basketball, baseball, fast-pitch softball and women's volleyball. The Patriots compete in the Mid-Florida Conference of the National Junior College Athletic Association (NJCAA) Region VIII and the Florida State College Activities Association.

CF's tennis programs produced three of the program's NJCAA national championships. The men's program won national titles in 1963 and 1981; the women's team won the NJCAA Division II championship in 2001. The men's basketball team won the NJCAA championship in 2013.

The Patriots won five state championships across three sports in the 1990s, including women's basketball titles in 1992 and in 1997, a men's basketball title in 1996, and consecutive baseball championships in 1997 and 1998.

The CF athletics program annually produces NCAA student-athletes and has started the careers of several professional athletes. Its prominent athletic alumni include former Major League Baseball players Brian Buscher, Mike Figga, and Bill Hurst. Clinton Hart, a seven-year veteran of the National Football League, began his collegiate athletic career as an outfielder for the Patriots baseball team.

Since 2006, three CF alumni have celebrated national championships at the NCAA level. Alberta Auguste won consecutive NCAA women's basketball titles at the University of Tennessee in 2006 and 2007; Nick Ebert won a College World Series title at the University of South Carolina in 2010; and Breanna Fort won an NCAA Division II national championship at Clayton State University in 2011.

In the spring of 2010, men's basketball standout Ricardo Ratliffe capped an historic two-year career at CF by winning the 2010 NJCAA Male Student-Athlete of the Year Award. The honor, selected from among all male student-athletes in all sports across the NJCAA's 525 member schools, marked the first national player of the year award won by a CF student-athlete. In June 2010, the CF District Board of Trustees voted to add women's volleyball to the school's athletics program, with its inaugural season scheduled for the fall of 2011.

The College of Central Florida announced in 2019 that the volleyball and basketball programs would be canceled after the 2019–2020 seasons.

== Notable alumni ==
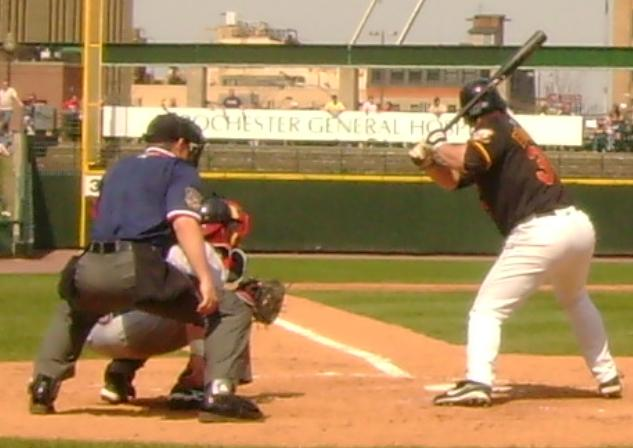
Brian Buscher

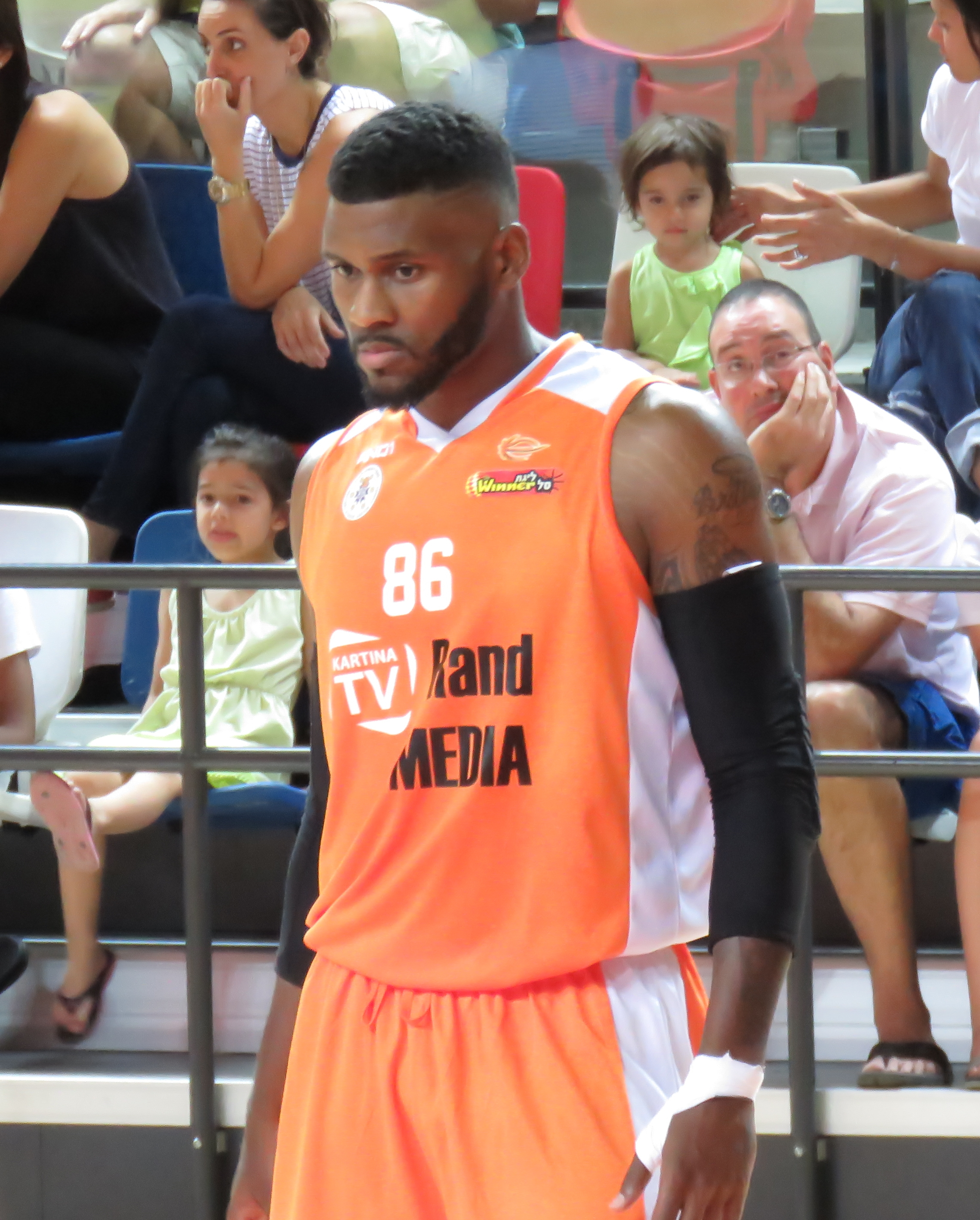
Darryl Monroe

- Dennis Baxley, member of the Florida Senate
- Brian Buscher, Major League Baseball player with the Minnesota Twins
- Evaldas Dainys, professional Lithuanian basketball player
- Charles Dean, member of the Florida Senate
- Javonte Douglas, professional international basketball player
- Mike Figga, MLB catcher with the New York Yankees and the Baltimore Orioles
- Clinton Hart, NFL player
- Patrick Hilliman, professional basketball player in the Netherlands
- Malia Hosaka, professional wrestler
- Bill Hurst, MLB pitcher with the Florida Marlins
- Kurt Kelly, member of the Florida House of Representatives
- Todd Lickliter, college basketball coach
- Kevin "K. J." Maura, professional basketball player in Puerto Rico
- Carlos Eduardo Mendoza, United States federal judge
- Darryl Monroe, professional basketball player in South Korea
- Mathiang Muo, professional basketball player in Australia
- Jordan Parks, professional basketball player in Italy
- Nate Pearson, MLB pitcher for Toronto Blue Jays and the Chicago Cubs
- Eddy Polanco, professional basketball player in Italy
- Ricardo Ratliffe, professional basketball player in South Korea
- Wade Simoneaux, college baseball coach
- Brandon Tabb, professional international basketball player
