= Panhandle Conference =

College athletic conference in the United States

- Association: NJCAA
- Commissioner: John Schultz
- Sports fielded: 13; men's: 5; women's: 8
- Division: Region 8
- No. of teams: 5
- Region: Florida

The Panhandle Conference is a conference within the National Junior College Athletic Association (NJCAA) Region 8. The conference consists of five state colleges located in Florida.

== Members ==
Member institutions are Chipola College, Pensacola State College, Northwest Florida State College, Gulf Coast State College, and Tallahassee State College.

== See also ==
- Florida State College Activities Association (FCSAA), the governing body of NJCAA Region 8
- Mid-Florida Conference, also in Region 8
- Southern Conference, also in Region 8
- Suncoast Conference, also in Region 8
