= Florida SouthWestern State College =

Public college in Fort Myers, Florida, US

- Former names: Edison Junior College (1962–1972); Edison Community College (1972–2004); Edison College (2004–2008); Edison State College (2008–2014)
- Type: Public college
- Established: 1962; 64 years ago
- Parent institution: Florida College System
- Accreditation: HLC
- Endowment: $50.3 million (2025)
- President: Jeffery Allbritten
- Faculty: 194 (full-time); 338 (part-time)
- Undergraduates: 14,326 (fall 2022)
- Location: Fort Myers, Florida, United States; 26.5513°N 81.8872°W
- Campus: Large suburb
- Colors: Purple and aqua
- Nickname: Buccaneers
- Sporting affiliations: NJCAA Region 8 – Suncoast Conference
- Mascot: Captain Blackbeard
- Website: www.fsw.edu

Florida SouthWestern State College (FSW) is a public college in Fort Myers, Florida, United States. It is a member of the Florida College System.

== History ==
FSW was established in 1962 as Edison Junior College, named after Thomas Edison, who spent winter months in Fort Myers. Its first campus opened in 1965. The school rebranded several times, reflecting changes in its mission and academic offerings. It became a baccalaureate-granting institution in 2008, when it was renamed Edison State College. In 2014, the college adopted its current name, cutting ties to Edison and aligning with its expanded geographic reach.

== Academics ==
FSW offers both associate and baccalaureate degrees, and several vocational certificate programs, focusing on healthcare, business, technology, and education. FSW is accredited by the Higher Learning Commission.

== Campuses ==
The main campus is located in Fort Myers, and covers 140 acres (57 ha). The college also has additional campuses, including the Charlotte Campus in Punta Gorda, which opened in 1997 and is the largest campus at 204 acres (83 ha). The Collier Campus, located in Naples, opened in 1992 on a 50-acre (20 ha) site. The main campus offers on-campus housing at LightHouse Commons.

Additionally, the Hendry/Glades Curtis Center in LaBelle serves as a hub for outreach programs. Hendry/Glades Curtis Center also offers classes for degree seeking students and classes for credits like its sister campuses that are part of FSW College system. It serves the students in both Hendry and Glades counties as well as students from other campuses and counties.

== Athletics ==
FSW reestablished its athletics program in 2014 under the "Buccaneers" moniker. Teams participate in the Suncoast Conference of the Florida State College Activities Association and the National Junior College Athletic Association. The 3,500-seat Suncoast Credit Union Arena opened in 2016 and is home to the basketball and volleyball teams, as well as the City of Palms Classic high school basketball tournament. Baseball and softball teams play at City of Palms Park.

== Notable alumni ==
- Brad Branson, former professional basketball player who played in the NBA for the Cleveland Cavaliers and Indiana Pacers
- Keon Ellis, professional NBA basketball player for the Brooklyn Nets
- Todd Fischer – former professional MLB baseball pitcher who played for the Angels
- Kris Foster – former professional MLB baseball pitcher who played for the Baltimore Orioles
- Charles Ghigna, poet and children's author
- Jan Hooks, comedian and actress, former Saturday Night Live cast member.
- Matt Hudson, member of the Florida House of Representatives
- Eric Knott – former professional MLB baseball pitcher who played for the Arizona Diamondbacks and Montreal Expos
- Joel Piñeiro, former professional baseball pitcher who played in MLB for the Seattle Mariners, Boston Red Sox, St. Louis Cardinals, and Los Angeles Angels of Anaheim
- Tina Wainscott, romance and suspense novelist
- Fuzzy Zoeller, professional golfer
