= Lake–Sumter State College =

Multi-campus public college in central Florida, US

Coordinates: 28.8276°N 81.7970°W

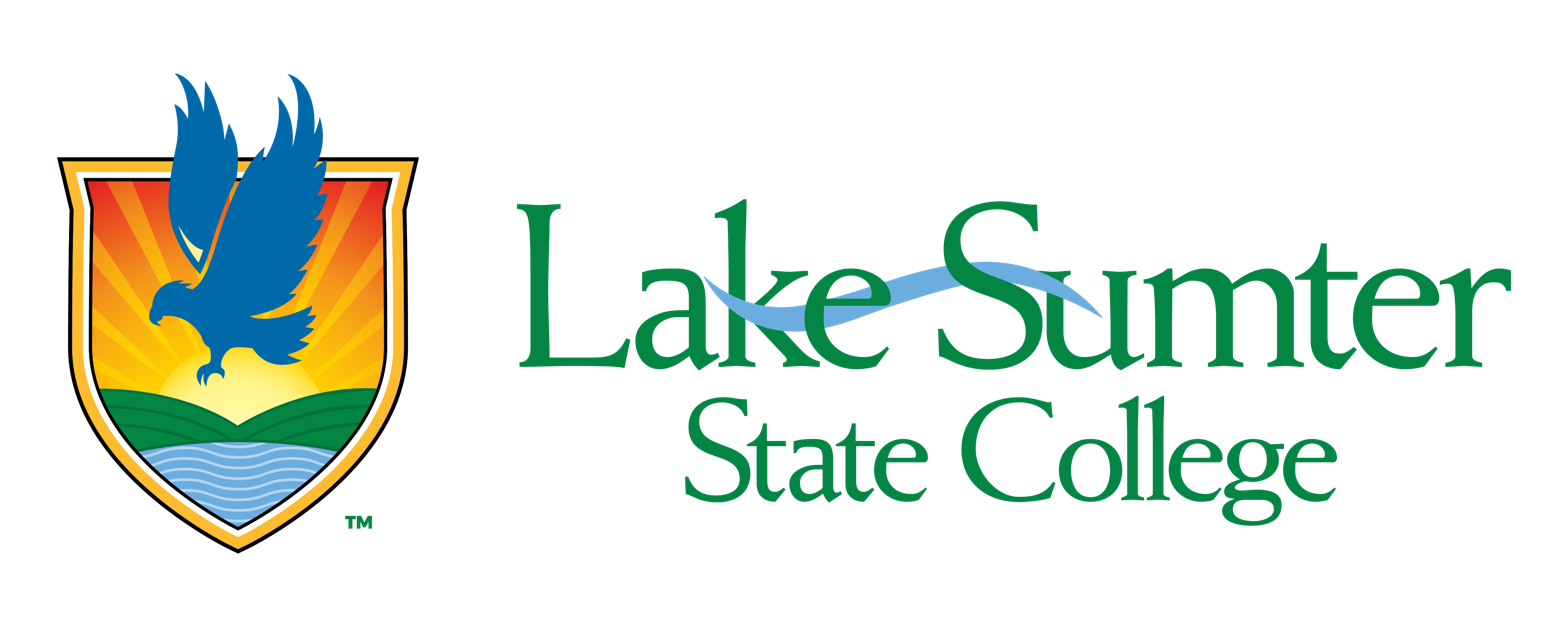
- Former names: Lake–Sumter Junior College (1962–1970); Lake–Sumter Community College (1970–2012)
- Motto: Where Futures Soar
- Type: Public college
- Established: 1962; 64 years ago
- Parent institution: Florida College System
- President: John P. Temple
- Faculty: 229 (fall 2014)
- Administrative staff: 203 (fall 2014)
- Students: 6,042 (fall 2014)
- Location: Leesburg, Florida, U.S.
- Campus: Leesburg South Lake (Clermont, Florida) Sumter (Sumterville, Florida)
- Colors: Blue & green
- Sporting affiliations: NJCAA Region 8, Mid-Florida Conference
- Mascot: Lakehawks
- Website: www.lssc.edu

Lake–Sumter State College is a public college with multiple campuses in Central Florida: three campuses in Lake and Sumter Counties; the original campus in Leesburg; the South Lake Campus in Clermont; and the Sumter Campus in Sumterville. It is a member of the Florida College System. The college also partners with The Villages Charter High School as a dual enrollment site.

== History ==
=== Before 1962 ===
The original campus site in Leesburg has served multiple purposes over time. Silver Lake, which is adjacent to the original campus, was a Pre-Columbian site known to indigenous Floridians before the coming of Columbus to the New World. It was originally part of the Timucuan territorial range and was known to the Seminoles who inhabited the area. The area was later home to turpentine mills, farming, citrus groves, winter tourists and land sales.

In 1942, the United States Army established an army air base, which extended from the current campus site across nearby U.S. Route 441. Today's campus buildings sit where the base's barracks were constructed. The site was home to the 313th Tactical Fighter Squadron for a short time in 1943. After the 313th Tactical Fighter Squadron left the location, German Prisoners of war (POW) moved into the barracks after being transferred to Leesburg from Camp Blanding. 250 POWs were held on the site. The Leesburg camp boasted one of the lowest rates of escape for prisoners in the country.

=== Formation and early years (1962–1987) ===
Lake–Sumter Junior College was formed in 1962 by the Florida Legislature following the concerted efforts of citizens of both Lake and Sumter counties and the Leesburg Area Chamber of Commerce to provide college education to residents of both counties. Several different sites were considered, including Tavares, Mt. Dora, and Wildwood, but it was in Leesburg that the campus found an official home. Land was donated to the college by the city of Leesburg in June 1962, and in the fall of that year, Lake–Sumter Junior College began operating under the state community college system. Classes began on September 5, 1962, in temporary facilities at Leesburg High School. The college was established in 1962 by the Florida Legislature due to the efforts of Lake and Sumter county citizens. In 1962 it began operating under the state community college system, and classes began September 5 of that year in temporary facilities at Leesburg High School with Dr. Paul P. Williams as the college's first President. In May 1964, groundbreaking for the 70 acre Leesburg campus began, and in January 1965 the library/administration building, two classroom buildings, and a teaching auditorium were opened to students.

Around the same time as Lake–Sumter Junior College began operations, Johnson Junior College – a college for African American students, who at the time were not permitted to study at Lake–Sumter, which was all white – also began operations at Carver Heights High School, led by President Perman Williams. The Civil Rights Act of 1964 prompted the Lake County School Board, the college's governing body, to merge Lake–Sumter Junior College and Johnson Junior College in 1965. Johnson Junior College operated for one final year as the Johnson center of Lake–Sumter Junior College.

The first commencement ceremony for Lake–Sumter Junior College was held in 1964 and 39 students graduated. The first and only commencement ceremony for Johnson Junior College was held in 1965 and 57 students graduated.

In 1965, Lake–Sumter Junior College was accredited by the Southern Association of Colleges and Schools (SACS) ensuring that credits earned at Lake–Sumter Junior College were accepted for transfer to other regionally-accredited institutions. Every decade since 1965, Lake–Sumter has been granted SACS reaffirmation of accreditation, most recently in June 2011.

Lake–Sumter Junior College became Lake–Sumter Community College (LSCC) in 1970 after the Florida Legislature authorized a Division of Community Colleges to oversee all community colleges in Florida.

=== Expansion (1988–2011) ===
The Leesburg campus was expanded from 70 acres to 114 acres in 1990 when the Florida Legislature appropriated funds for the board of trustees to purchase two additional parcels of land adjacent to the campus. Since then, other parcels have been added to the college's US Highway 441 frontage with the purchases of Building M and the Facilities building. The Health Sciences Center, Science-Math Building, refurbished Everett A. Kelly Convocation Center/Magnolia Room, and the Sports and Recreation Complex have also enhanced the campus' facilities.

In 1988, LSCC began planning for a campus in Sumter County. LSCC and the Sumter County School Board adopted a resolution to establish a joint-use facility in Sumterville that would provide adult education classes for the School Board and college-level programs. Through the efforts of the college, community, and many individuals, the 40 acre Sumter Center welcomed its first students in the summer of 1995. A joint-use agreement was finalized with the Sumter County Library System in July 1999 for the operation of a shared library facility at the Sumter campus. The Clark Maxwell, Jr. Library and Student Services Building opened in January 2000. The joint-use agreement with the Sumter County Library System remained in place until August 2014, when the county terminated the agreement.

Planning for the South Lake campus began as far back as 1993, but it wasn't until 1999 that the plan became a reality. The college opened its first building at the South Lake campus on September 20, 1999, but closed on September 21 due to Tropical Storm Harvey. With the addition of a second building in March 2002, the campus fully supported a partnership with the University of Central Florida, South Lake Hospital, and the National Training Center. The joint-use campus offers both UCF and LSSC classes as well as a library that serves public, college, and university library users. Planning for the Cooper Memorial Library on the South Lake campus began in 2006 and the joint-use facility serving LSCC, UCF and the Lake County Library System opened on August 17, 2009. The new building retained the name of the Cooper Memorial Library, commemorating the South Lake area's first public library.

In August 2011, the college's district board of trustees voted unanimously to enhance Lake–Sumter Community College's academic program by offering four-year Bachelor of Science and/or Bachelor of Applied Science degrees. Required permissions for the expansion were sought and granted by the State of Florida and the Southern Association of Colleges and Schools Commission on Colleges. In January 2013 classes began for the college's first four-year degree, the Bachelor of Applied Science in Organizational Management.

=== 50th anniversary and future (2012–present) ===
During the 2012–2013 year, the college celebrated its 50th anniversary using the slogan, "Appreciating the Past, Anticipating the Future". Because of the newly inaugurated four-year degree program, the college's name was changed from Lake–Sumter Community College to Lake–Sumter State College on November 1, 2012. Along with this name change the original nickname and mascot for the school's athletic teams, the Lakers, was changed to the Lakehawks which is used in the college's official logos.

== Academics ==
Lake–Sumter State Colleges offers Associate of Arts degrees, Associate of Applied Science degrees, Associate of Science degrees, vocational and technical certificates, and a Bachelor of Applied Science degree in Organizational Management.

Lake–Sumter State College also participates in the DirectConnect to UCF program. LSSC Students who sign up for DirectConnect to UCF are guaranteed acceptance and accelerated admission to the University of Central Florida.

== Student life ==
LSSC encourages student participation in activities that complement the academic programs of the college by providing opportunities for leadership development, pursuit of special interests, and social interaction. Opportunities for participation include the Student Government Association, Campus Diplomats, Leadership Institute, clubs and organizations, student publications, intramurals and campus recreation, and community service.

== Athletics ==
Lake–Sumter State College offers intercollegiate athletics in three sports for both men and women. The LSSC Athletic Program completes in Women's Volleyball, Women's Fast-Pitch Softball, and Men's Baseball. The college competes as a Division 1 program in the Mid-Florida Conference of the Florida State College Activities Association (FSCAA) in the Mid-Florida Conference. The FSCAA is governed by the rules of the National Junior Community College Athletic Association (NJCAA), of which Lake-Sumter is a member of Region 8. Intercollegiate athletics has become an integral part of student life on campus. The program offers scholarships to local student-athletes who have excelled academically and athletically during their high school careers. These scholarships are based upon financial need, scholastic aptitude and athletic excellence.

== Mascot ==
Lake–Sumter State College adopted the "Lakehawks" nickname in 2012. They got a new mascot in 2019, Swoop the Lakehawk, a hawk dressed in a green college shirt and bright yellow bucket hat. The name of the mascot was chosen by the faculty, students, and staff of the college.

== Notable alumni ==
- Carey Baker – Former member of the Florida State Senate
- Ben Potter – Discoverer of youngest Ice Age infants ever found in North America
