= Gulf Coast State College =

Public college in Panama City, Florida, U.S.

Coordinates: 30°11′13″N 85°43′35″W

- Type: Public college
- Established: 1957; 69 years ago
- Parent institution: Florida College System
- Endowment: $30 million (2016)
- President: Glen McDonald
- Students: c. 7,000
- Location: Panama City, Florida, U.S.
- Colors: Blue & gold
- Sporting affiliations: NJCAA Region 8, Panhandle Conference
- Mascot: Commodores
- Website: www.gulfcoast.edu

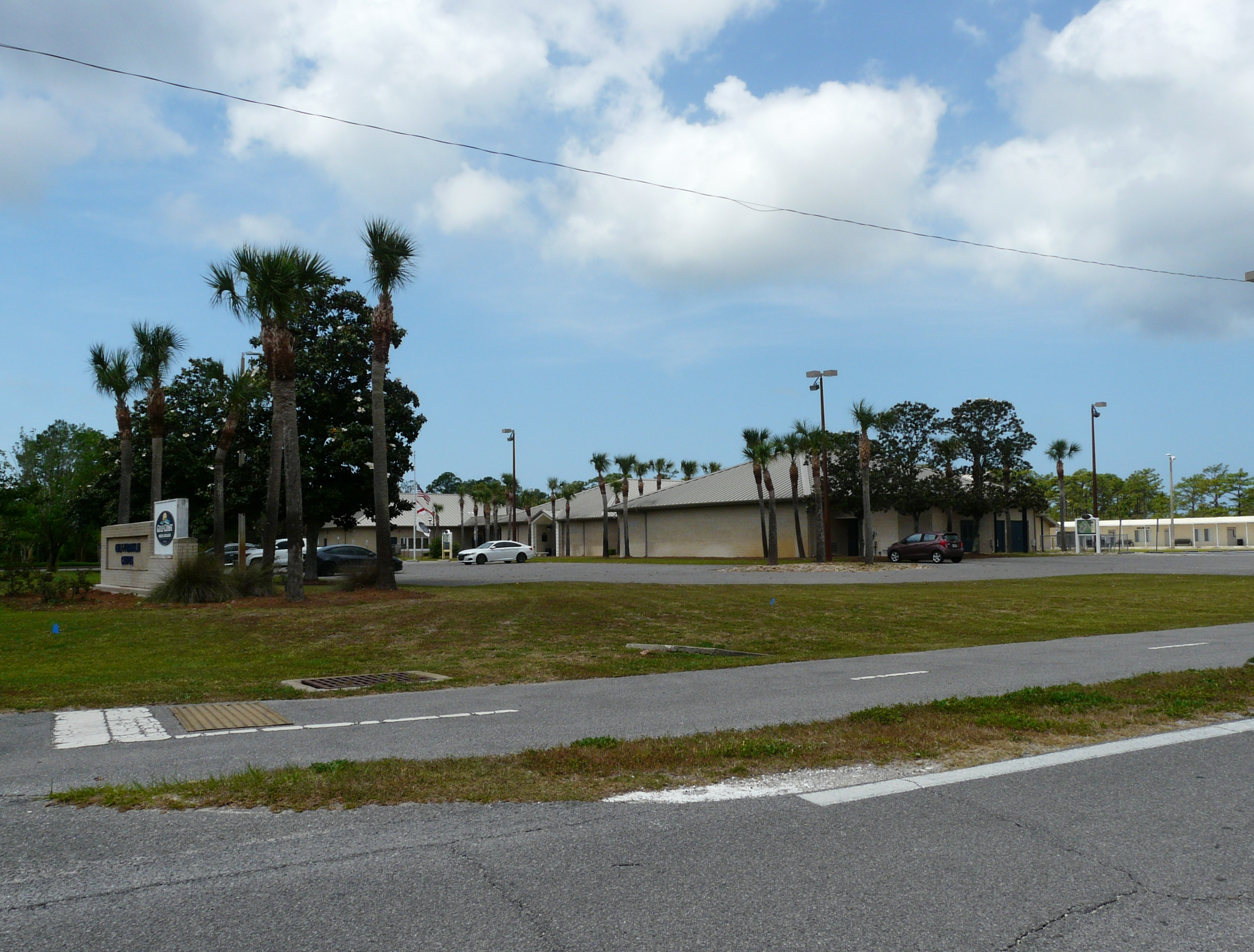
Gulf/Franklin Campus in Port St. Joe, Florida

Gulf Coast State College is a public college in Panama City, Florida, United States. It is part of the Florida College System. It offers the Associate of Arts degree, Associate of Science degree, certificates, and as of 2011, bachelor's degrees.

== History ==
The institution was founded in 1957 by the Florida Legislature. On January 13, 2011, the college was renamed Gulf Coast State College. The school had previously been named Gulf Coast Community College as well as Gulf Coast Junior College.

In 1966, Rosenwald Junior College was merged with Gulf Coast Junior College.

== Campus ==
The main college campus is in Panama City, Florida, with other campuses in Southport, in Port St. Joe, and at Tyndall Air Force Base.

== Organization and administration ==
The college is a member institution of the Florida College System. Its president is John Holdnak, Ed.D. President Holdnak is its sixth, having assumed that position in June 2014. A district board of trustees oversees the administration of the college.

== Academics ==
Gulf Coast State College offers associate and bachelor's degrees.

== Student life ==
=== Athletics ===
Gulf Coast State College Athletic teams are nicknamed the Commodores and participate in men's basketball, men's baseball, women's basketball, women's softball, and women's volleyball. The school's athletic teams compete in the Panhandle Conference of the Florida State College Activities Association, a body of the National Junior College Athletic Association Region 8.

== Notable people ==
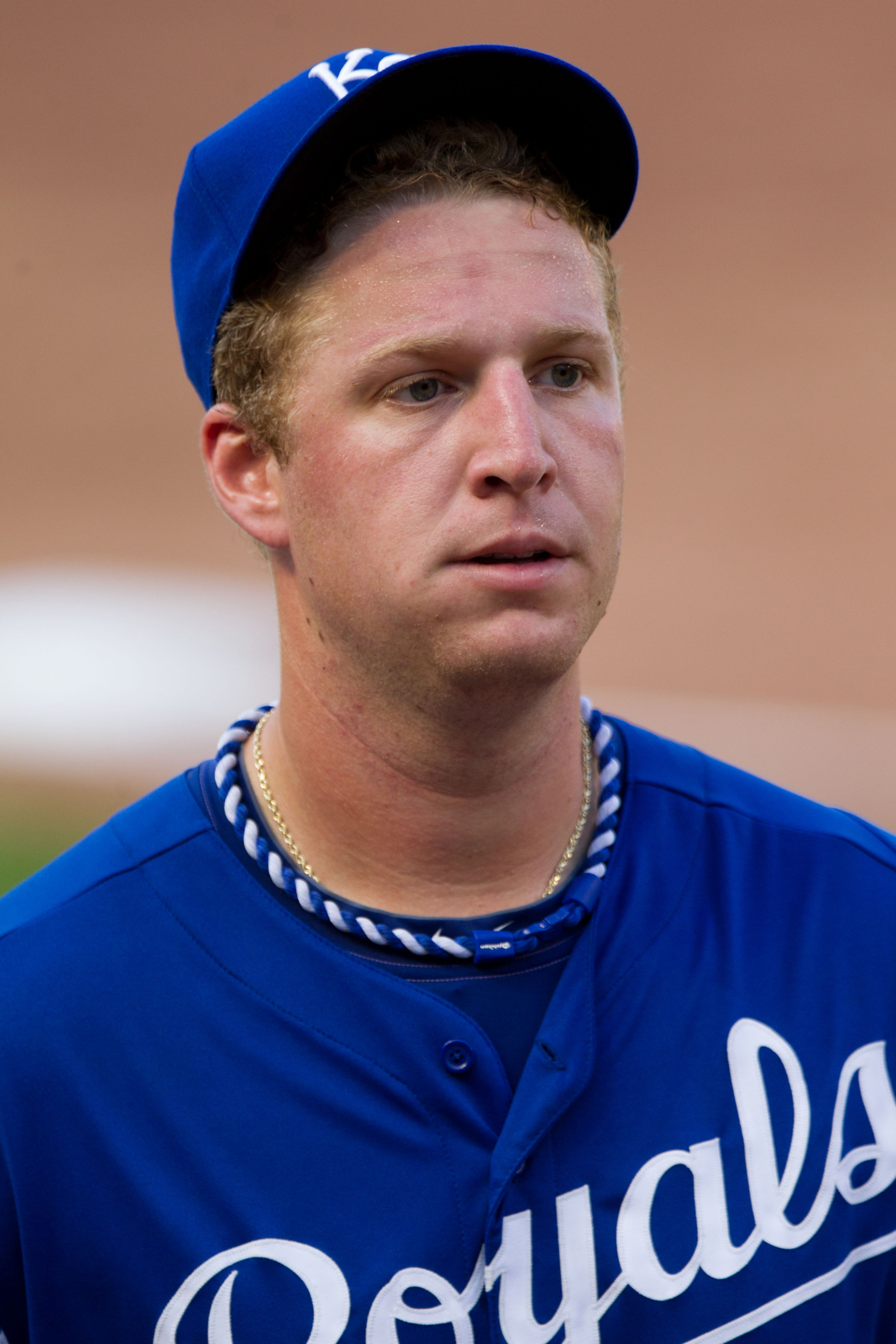
Will Smith

- Daniel Davidson - former Major League Baseball pitcher
- Tony Dawson - former NBA player
- Matt Foster - current MLB player for the Chicago White Sox
- Terrance Gore - MLB player who won three World Series rings: the 2015 World Series with the Kansas City Royals, the 2020 World Series with the Los Angeles Dodgers, and the 2021 World Series with the Atlanta Braves
- Vontrell Jamison - former NFL player
- Smoke Laval - college baseball coach of Louisiana–Monroe, LSU, and North Florida
- Frank Menechino - former Major League Baseball infielder for the Oakland Athletics and the Toronto Blue Jays
- Michael Papajohn - actor, stuntman, and college baseball player
- Jimmy Patronis - U.S. Representative from Florida's 1st congressional district, chief financial officer of Florida, state fire marshal, and member of the Florida Cabinet
- Said Sharbini - politician
- Will Smith - current Major League Baseball pitcher who won three consecutive World Series rings with the 2021 Atlanta Braves, 2022 Houston Astros, and 2023 Texas Rangers
- Don Sutton - former Major League Baseball player and television sportscaster; holds the Los Angeles Dodgers all-time wins record (233); held the Dodgers strikeout record (2696) for 42 years
