= Pasco–Hernando State College =

Public college in Pasco and Hernando counties, Florida, US

Coordinates: 28.3792485°N 82.2175365°W

Pasco-Hernando State College
- Former name: Pasco-Hernando Community College (1967-2014)
- Type: Public college
- Established: 1967
- Parent institution: Florida College System
- Accreditation: SACSCOC
- President: Eric Hall
- Students: 9,886
- Location: Pasco County, Florida and Hernando County, Florida, United States
- Campus: Suburban
- Colors: Black and Gold
- Nickname: Bobcats
- Sporting affiliations: NJCAA Region 8 – Suncoast Conference
- Mascot: Bobcat
- Website: www.phsc.edu

Pasco–Hernando State College (PHSC) is a public college in Florida with campuses in Pasco and Hernando counties. The college was established in 1967 by the Florida Legislature, and then opened to students in the fall of 1972. It is part of the Florida College System and has additional campuses in Brooksville, Dade City, New Port Richey, Spring Hill, and Wesley Chapel. The name of the school changed from Pasco-Hernando Community College to Pasco–Hernando State College in 2014.

== History ==
Pasco-Hernando Community College was established in 1967 in New Port Richey, Florida by the Florida Legislature and opened to students in the fall of 1972. It was established as part of the Florida College System and opened campuses in Brooksville, Dade City, and Spring Hill.

In March 2013, PHCC president Katherine Johnson announced plans to change the college's name to reflect that it would begin to offer baccalaureate programs in 2014. The school sought public feedback via its website regarding four proposed new names. The name changed to Pasco–Hernando State College on January 21, 2014.

A fifth campus opened in 2014 in Wesley Chapel to serve central Pasco County. The new campus was named the Porter Campus at Wiregrass Ranch after the Porter family which donated the land to the college. In October 2024, PHSC opened its Institute for Nursing and Allied Health Advancement at the Porter Campus and its Workforce Development Center at Gowers Corner in Spring Hill.

In May 2025, Jesse Pisors, the college's president abruptly resigned. The chair of the college's board of trustees, Marilyn Pearson-Adams, had called for a meeting of the trustees in the wake of student enrollment data being made available by the state's Department of Government Efficiency. The report alleged that the college had the second worst retention rate among the 28 institution's in the state's college system. Pearson-Adams claims to have requested student enrollment and retention data from Pisors that he never provided. Eric Hall was subsequently hired by the board as the college's president.

== Campuses ==
Pasco–Hernando State College has seven locations in Pasco County and Hernando, County, Florida.

- East Campus – Dade City
- North Campus – Brooksville
- Porter Campus at Wiregrass Ranch – Wesley Chapel
- Spring Hill Campus – Spring Hill
- West Campus and District Office – New Port Richey
- Instructional Performing Arts Center – Wesley Chapel
- Workforce Development Center at Gowers Corner – Spring Hill

== Academics ==
PHSC offers a Bachelor of Applied Science, Bachelor of Science, Associate in Arts, and Associate in Science degree programs. It also offers certificates, diplomas, and apprenticeships. The college also offers dual-enrollment classes for high school students. It offers degrees in 38 fields, including the popular programs Liberal Arts and Sciences, Mental and Society Health Services, and Registered Nursing. Its enrollment is 9,886 in the fall of 2024.

Pasco–Hernando State College is accredited by the Southern Association of Colleges and Schools Commission on Colleges (SACSCOC) to award associate and baccalaureate degrees.

== Athletics ==
PHSC's Collegiate Sports offers seven sports and is a member of the National Junior College Athletic Association (NJCAA) and the Florida College System Activities Association (FCSAA). Its mascot is the Bobcat. Its colors are black and gold. Lyndon Coleman became its athletics director in 2025.

=== Collegiate Sports ===
The PHSC Bobcats compete in seven NJCAA sports:

==== Men's sports ====
- Baseball
- Basketball
- Cross Country

==== Women's sports ====
- Cross Country
- Flag Football
- Soccer
- Softball
- Volleyball

== Notable alumni ==
Name	Notability	References
Kurt S. Browning	Florida's Secretary of State and Superintendent of Schools of Pasco County, Florida	
Greg Jones	Retired Major League Baseball pitcher	
Jay Forry	National syndicated film critic known as "the nation's only blind movie critic"	
John Legg	Member of the Florida House of Representatives and Florida Senate	
George Lowe	Voice actor and comedian	
Lucy Morgan	Journalist; winner of 1985 Pulitzer Prize for Investigative Reporting	
Robert Schenck	Member of the Florida House of Representatives	
Wilton Simpson	Member of the Florida Senate and Florida Commissioner of Agriculture	

== See also ==
- Florida College System
