= Seminole State College of Florida =

Public college in Sanford, Florida, US

- Former names: Seminole Junior College (1965–1975); Seminole Community College (1975–2009)
- Type: Public college
- Established: 1965; 61 years ago
- Parent institution: Florida College System
- Accreditation: SACS
- Endowment: $12.5 million (2024)
- Budget: $95.6 million (2024)
- President: Georgia L. Lorenz
- Faculty: 202 (full-time); 360 (part-time)
- Undergraduates: 14,323 (fall 2022)
- Location: Sanford, Florida, United States; 28.7444°N 81.3055°W
- Campus: Large suburb
- Colors: Dark blue and bright gold
- Nickname: Raiders
- Sporting affiliations: NJCAA Region 8 – Mid-Florida Conference
- Mascot: Rally Raider
- Website: www.seminolestate.edu

Seminole State College of Florida is a public college based in Sanford, Florida, United States, with other campuses within Seminole County. It is part of the Florida College System. Established in 1965, the college offers associate and bachelor's degrees, along with various certificate programs, available both on campus and online.

Seminole State is accredited by the Southern Association of Colleges and Schools, with additional accreditations for its business and nursing programs. It partners with the University of Central Florida (UCF) through the "DirectConnect to UCF" program, which guarantees admission for graduates.

The SCC logo circa 1997–2009

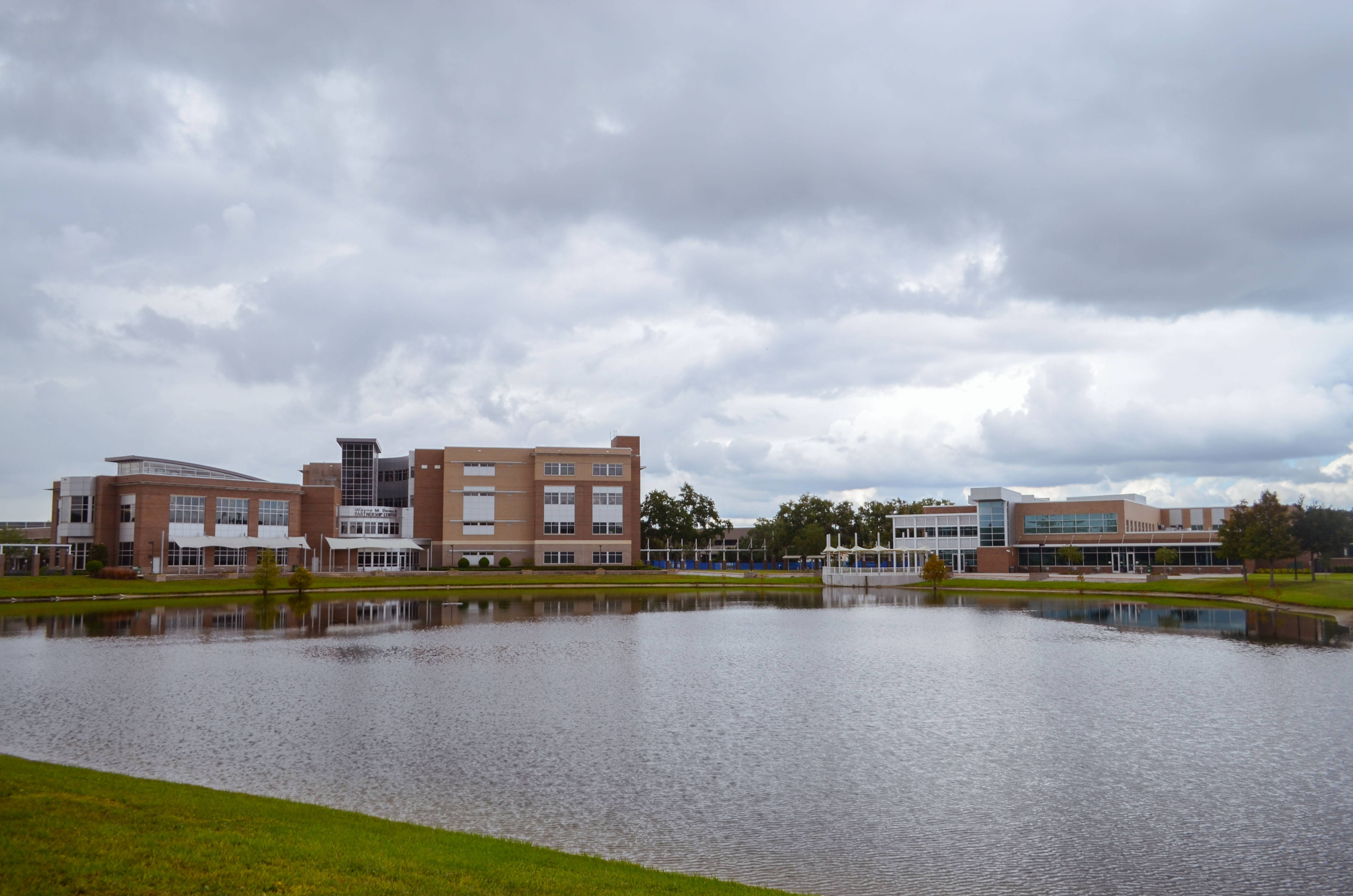
View of a few buildings at Seminole State College

== Campuses ==
- The main campus in Sanford features a broad range of academic programs, as well as the Grindle Honors Institute, a fine arts theater, a planetarium, and the Center for Public Safety.
- The Oviedo campus supports students planning to transfer to UCF
- The Altamonte Springs campus focuses on healthcare, general education, and adult education.
- The Center for Economic Development in Heathrow provides workforce training and supports local technology industries in collaboration with area businesses.

== Notable alumni ==
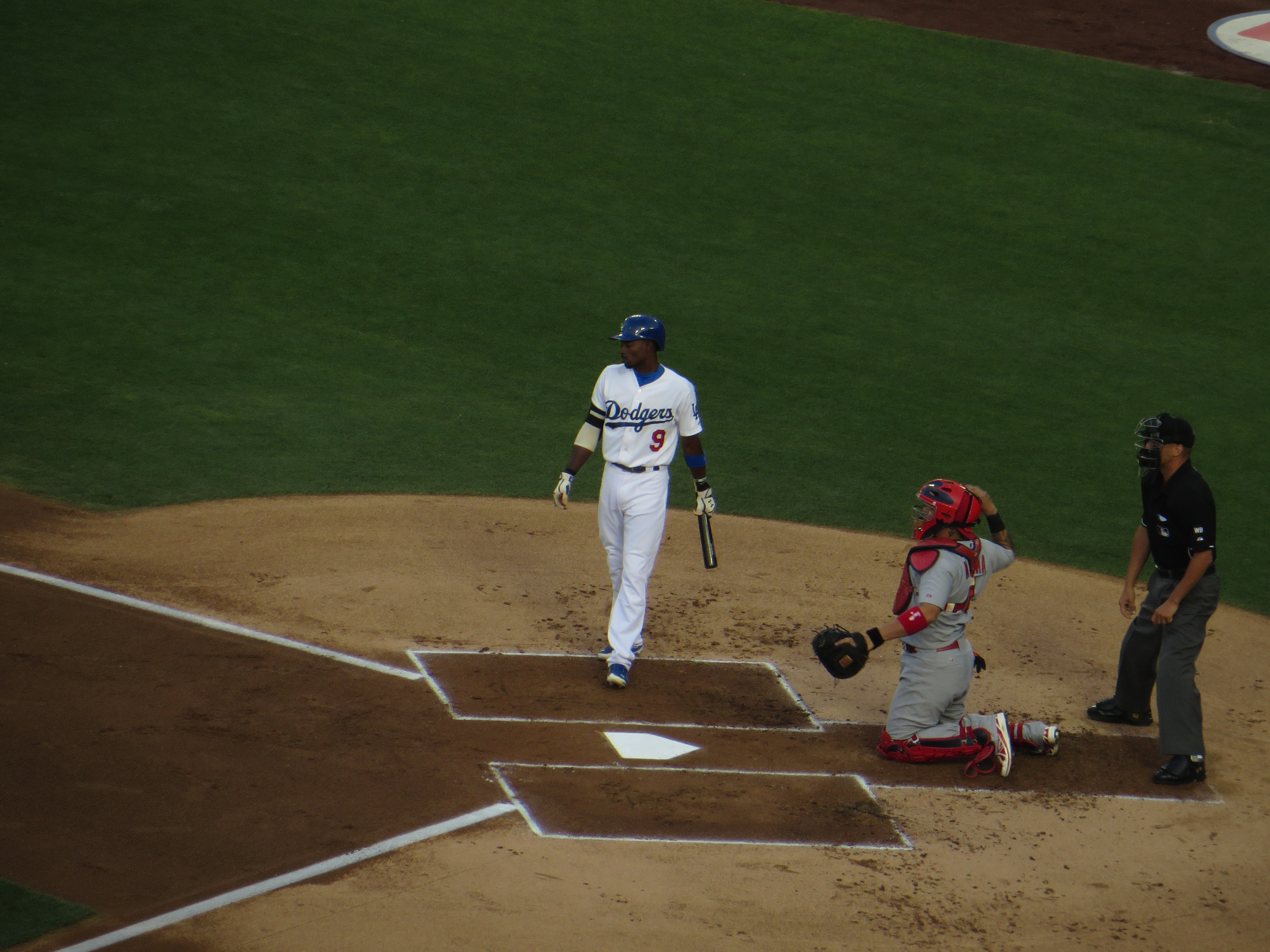
Dee Gordon

- Wendy Bruce, retired gymnast
- Mike Clevinger, professional baseball player
- Rob Ducey, professional baseball player and member of 2004 Canadian Olympic team
- Chad Epperson, professional baseball manager, coach, and former player
- Dee Gordon, professional baseball player
- John Hart, professional baseball manager
- Ed Hickox, professional baseball umpire
- Norm Lewis, Broadway actor
- Doug Marlette, cartoonist
- Preston McGann, professional football player
- Ross Minor, blind accessibility content creator and former para swimmer
- Brett Oberholtzer, professional baseball player
- Paula Pell, comedy and screenwriter
- Mikael Pernfors, professional tennis player
- Hardy Rawls, actor
- Bobby Thigpen, professional baseball player
- George Zimmerman, man who fatally shot Trayvon Martin
