= Polk State College =

Public college in Winter Haven, Florida, US

Coordinates: 27.9906672°N 81.8900359°W

- Former names: Polk Junior College (1964–1971); Polk Community College (1971–2009)
- Type: Public college
- Established: 1964; 62 years ago
- Parent institution: Florida College System
- Accreditation: SACS
- Endowment: $34.1 million (2024)
- Budget: $70 million (2024)
- President: Anastasios Kamoutsas
- Faculty: 150 (full-time); 212 (part-time)
- Undergraduates: 8,180 (fall 2022)
- Location: Winter Haven, Florida, United States
- Campus: Small city
- Colors: Red, yellow, and black
- Nickname: Eagles
- Sporting affiliations: NJCAA Region 8 – Suncoast Conference
- Website: www.polk.edu

Polk State College (PSC) is a public college based in Winter Haven, Florida, United States. It is part of the Florida College System and was established in 1964. PSC operates its main campuses in Winter Haven and Lakeland, with additional education centers in Bartow and Lake Wales. The college offers both associate and bachelor's degrees.

PSC also operates three charter high schools on its Winter Haven and Lakeland campuses, allowing high school students to earn an Associate in Arts degree while completing their high school diploma.

The college also participates in the Suncoast Conference of the NJCAA Region 8, offering athletic programs in men's basketball, baseball, and women's cheerleading, soccer, softball, and volleyball. The men's basketball team has won several conference and regional championships.

== Notable people ==
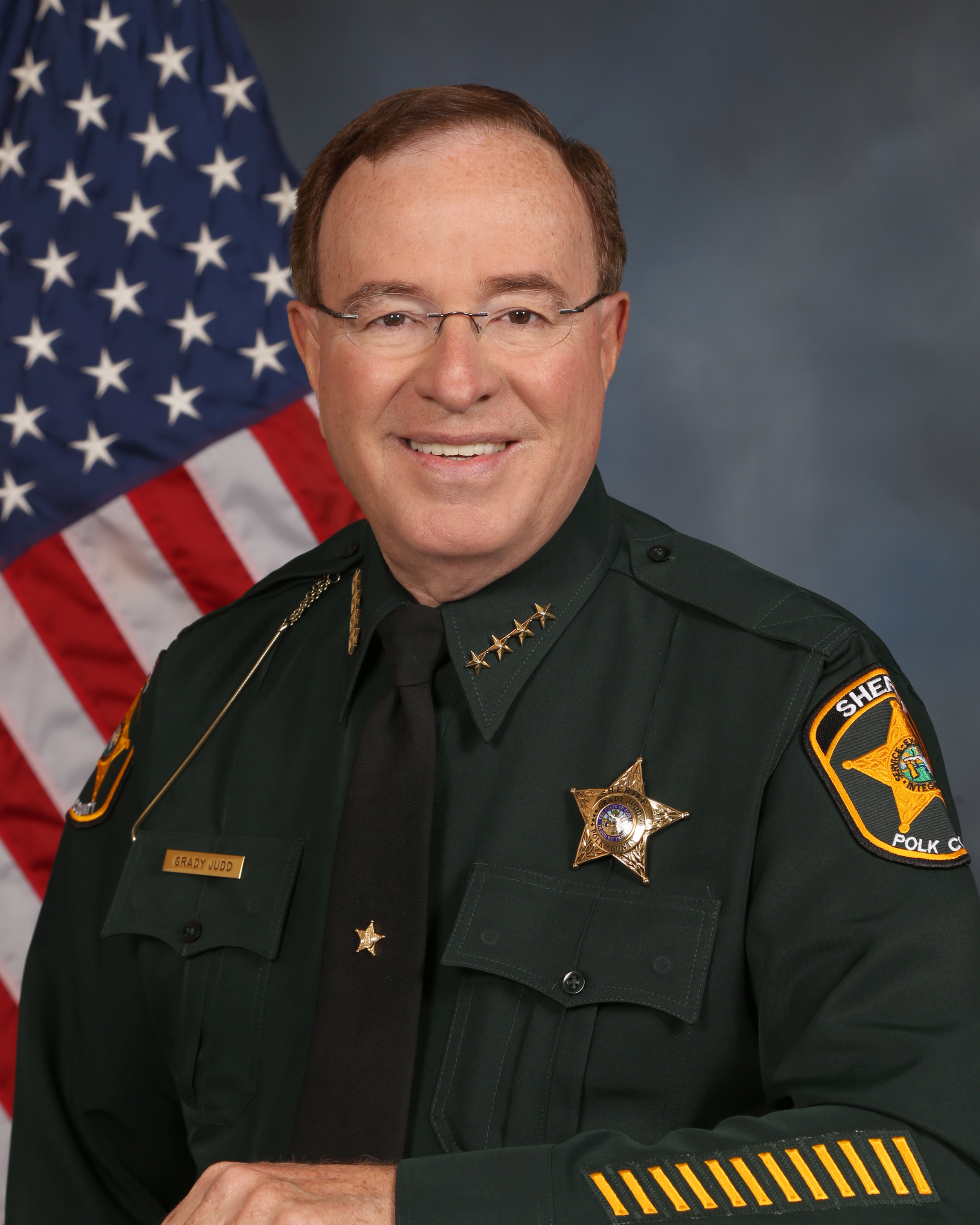
Grady Judd

- Alec Asher, professional baseball player
- Mark Brisker, American-Israeli professional basketball player
- Robert Gilchrist, professional basketball player
- Denise Grimsley, member of the Florida House of Representatives
- Grady Judd, sheriff of Polk County, Florida
- Maryly Van Leer Peck, academic
- Dean Pelman, baseball pitcher for the Israel national baseball team
- Lawrence Scarpa, architect
- Lorenzo Williams, professional basketball player
