= Tallahassee State College =

Public college in Tallahassee, Florida, US

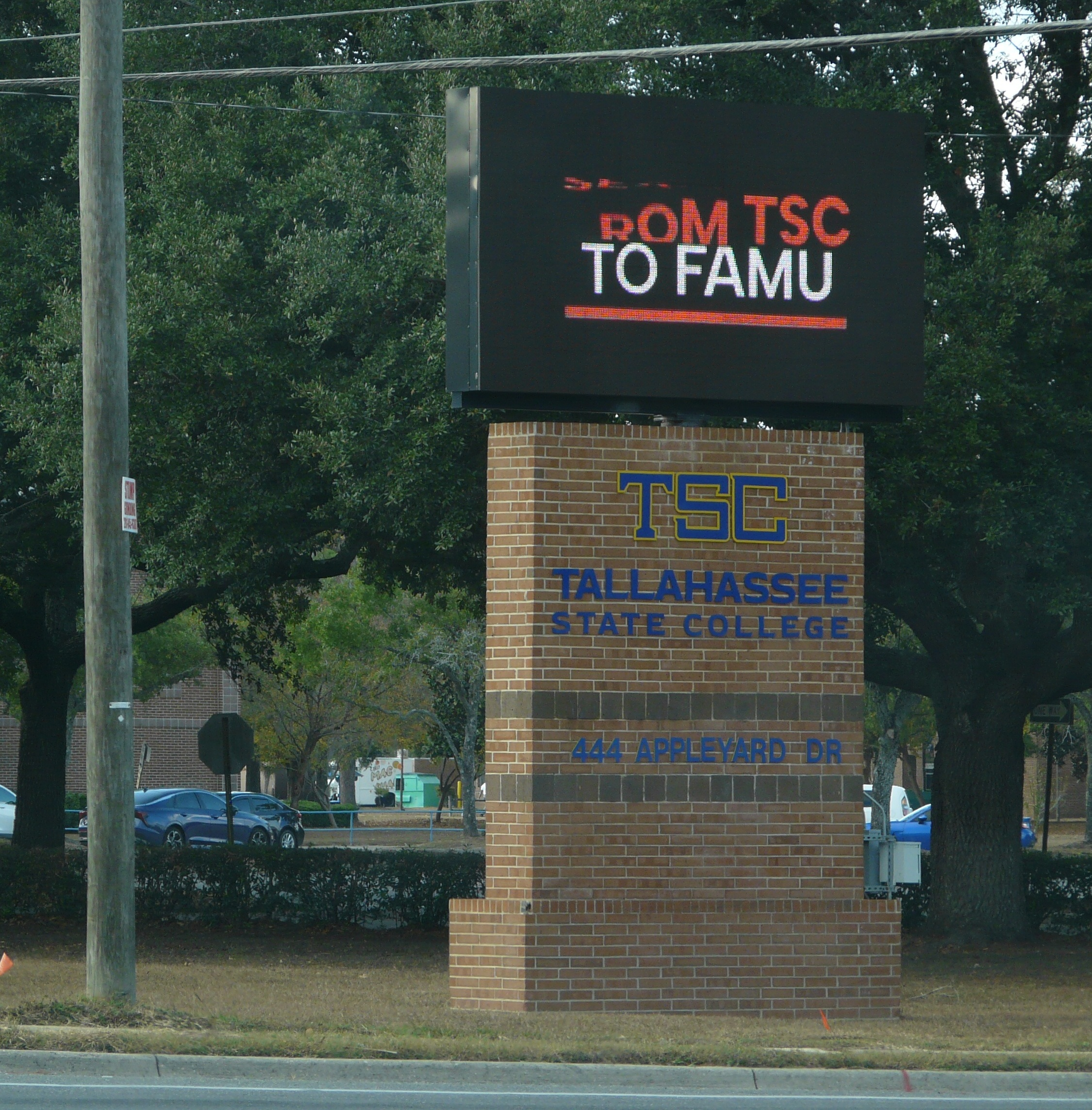
- Motto: The College of Choice
- Type: Public college
- Established: 1966; 60 years ago
- Parent institution: Florida College System
- Endowment: $30.4 million
- Chairman: Karen B. Moore
- President: Jim Murdaugh
- Faculty: 1,468
- Students: 11,671 (2022)
- Location: Tallahassee, Florida, United States; 30°26′43″N 84°20′26″W
- Campus: Suburban, 200 acres (81 ha)
- Colors: Blue and gold
- Nickname: Eagles
- Sporting affiliations: NJCAA Region 8, Panhandle Conference
- Website: www.tsc.fl.edu

Tallahassee State College (TSC) is a public college in Tallahassee, Florida, United States. It is part of the Florida College System and the Southern Association of Colleges and Schools has accredited the school. Peak enrollment was fall 2014 when TSC reported 38,017 students. From 1970 to 2024, the institution was known as Tallahassee Community College.

== History ==
Tallahassee Junior College was founded in 1966 by the Florida Legislature. Prior to completion of the main campus, classes were held at Godby High School.

The campus was built on what had been Tallahassee's airport, Dale Mabry Field, prior to the opening of the Tallahassee Municipal Airport in 1961. The former runways of the airport are still visible, and these paved areas are used primarily for parking.

The college was renamed Tallahassee Community College in 1970 and has grown from an initial enrollment of 698 students to more than 15,000 students annually. On July 1, 2024, the school was rebranded as Tallahassee State College to reflect its expanding statewide impact. TSC offers a wide range of academic and workforce training programs, including associate degrees, bachelor’s degrees, and in-demand certifications.

There have been six presidents in the history of the college:

Seq	President	Years in Office
1	Fred W. Turner	1965-1979
2	Marm M. Harris	1979-1982
interim	Fred W. Turner	1982-1983
3	James H. Hinson, Jr.	1983-1995
4	T. K. Wetherell	1995-2001
5	William D. Law	2002-2009
6	Jim Murdaugh	2010–present

Tallahassee State College had an annual economic impact of $387.7 million as of 2015.

== Locations ==
The main campus is located 1.9 miles from Florida State University. The surrounding area is primarily made up of student housing and commercial amenities that cater to college students.

=== Campuses ===
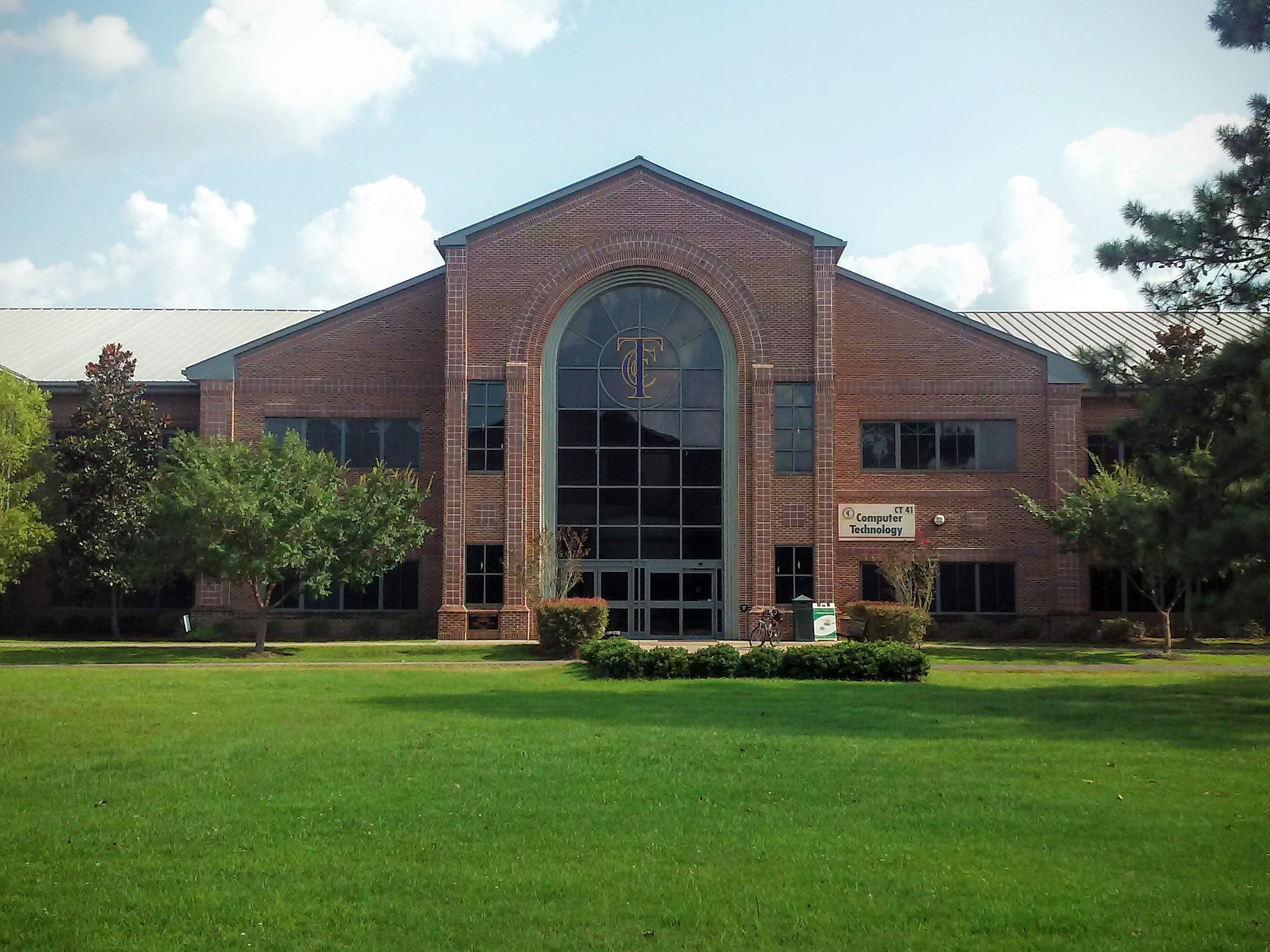
Classroom building on the main campus

- Main Campus, 195-acre (0.79 km^{2}) located on the west side of Tallahassee, opened in 1967.

=== Centers ===
- Center for Innovation
- Gadsden Center, located in Quincy, Florida, opened in 2016.
- Wakulla Center, located in Crawfordville, Florida, opened in 2006.
- Wakulla Environmental Institute (WEI), located in Crawfordville, Florida.

=== Public Safety ===
A state-sponsored law-enforcement training program was proposed in the 1990s, to be administered by the Leon County Schools. When T.K. Wetherell became President of Tallahassee Community College (TCC) in 1995, he used his legislative influence as former speaker of the house to move the program under TCC control. The Pat Thomas Law Enforcement Academy was named for popular Quincy legislator Pat Thomas in 1996. Jim Murdaugh was hired by Wetherell to lead the Pat Thomas Law Enforcement Academy in 1999.

TCC purchased 833 acres in Gadsden County near Havana in 2003 for the training center. The property grew to include 1,500 acres. Training for firefighters and EMTs was proposed, but none of the involved agencies wanted it to be under a law enforcement group. TCC partnered with Tallahassee Fire Department to establish the Tallahassee Fire Academy in 2007. Governor Jeb Bush stated that he wanted to consolidate law enforcement training for the state agencies. Murdaugh listened and began planning and researching to make it happen.

== Academics ==
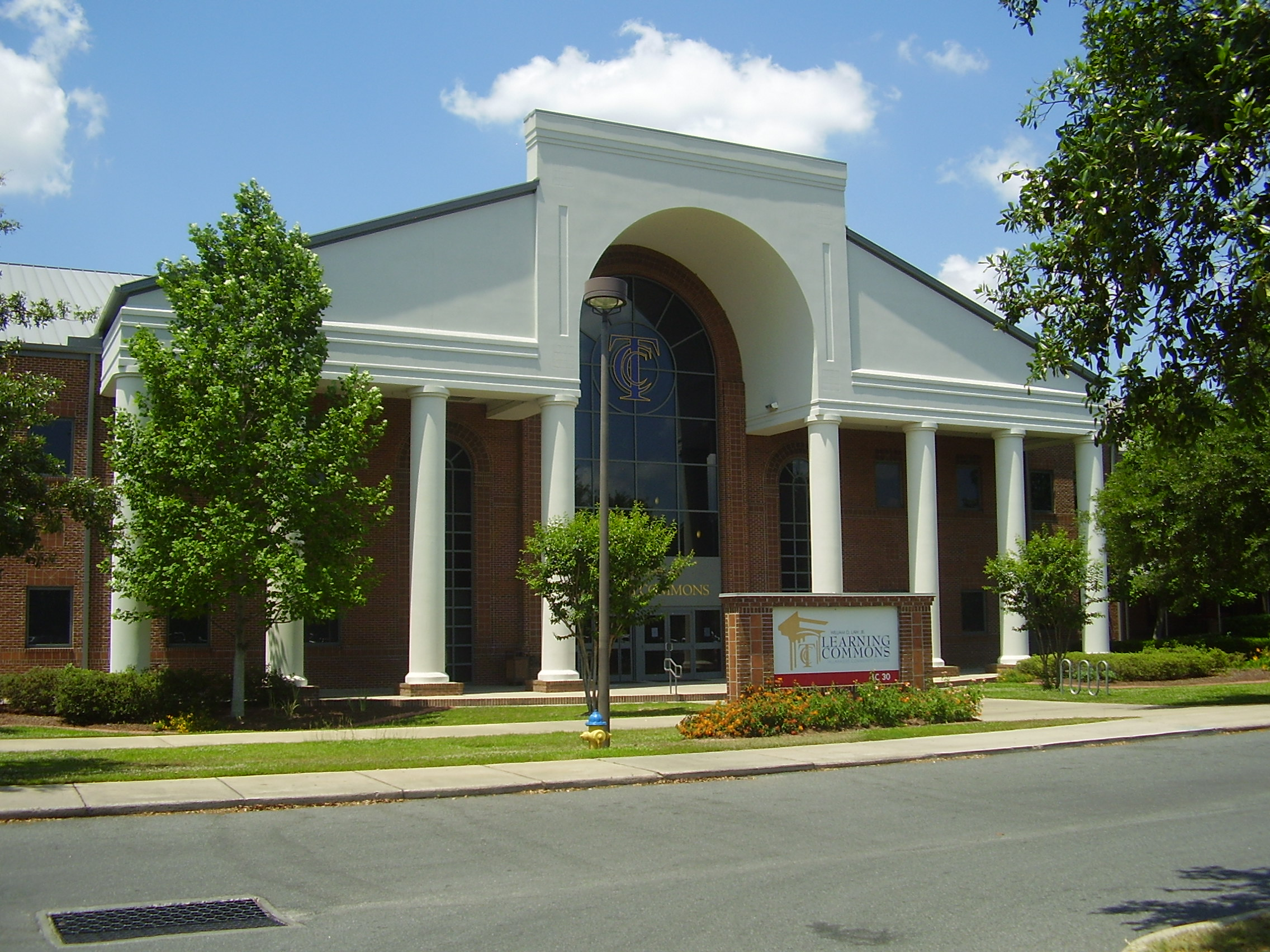
The TSC Learning Commons

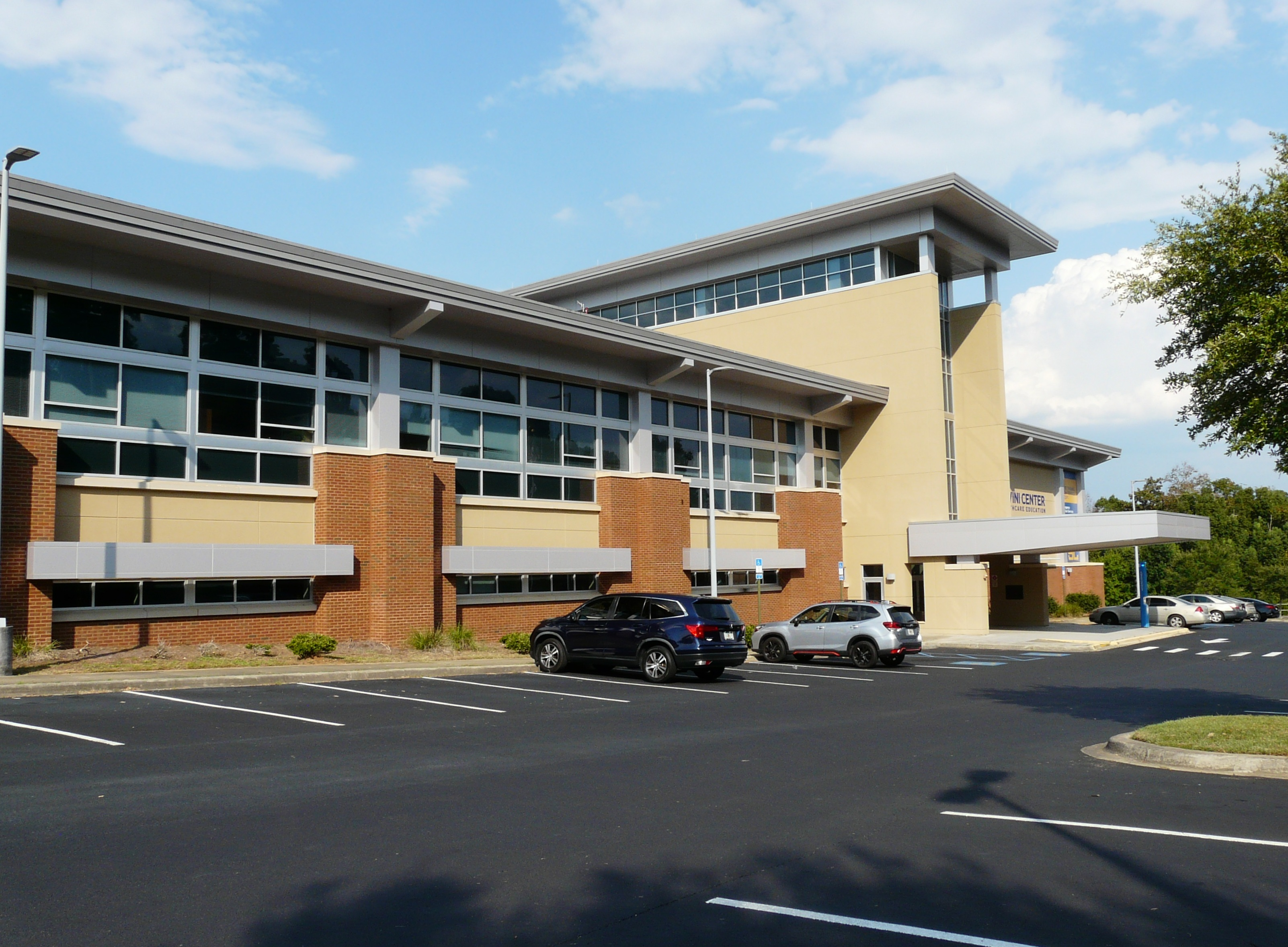
Ghazvini Center for Healthcare Education

TSC has 121 programs leading to degrees, certificates and job-training programs in:

- Art, Communication, Design and Humanities
- Education
- Business
- Health Science
- Construction, Trucking and Manufacturing
- Public Safety
- Engineering, Science, Technology and Mathematics
- Social & Behavioral Sciences, Human Sciences

TSC also offers four bachelor's degrees: Bachelor of Applied Science in Business Administration or
Bachelor of Science in Elementary Education, Exceptional Student Education, or Nursing

=== Enrollment ===
As of the Fall of 2022:

- Enrollment was 11,671
- 97% of students came from Florida; 10 students outside the U.S.; students came from 39 different states and Washington, DC
- 41% of students came to TSC from outside the service district of Leon, Wakulla, and Gadsden counties. Top Florida counties for enrollment include Broward, Miami-Dade, Hillsborough, Orange, and Palm Beach.
- 40% white; 30% Black, 25% Hispanic, 4% Multi-Racial
- 56% female; 44% male
- 54% full-time course load; 46% part-time course load
- 71% 21 & under; 11% 22-24; 13% 25-39; 5% 40+

== Student life ==
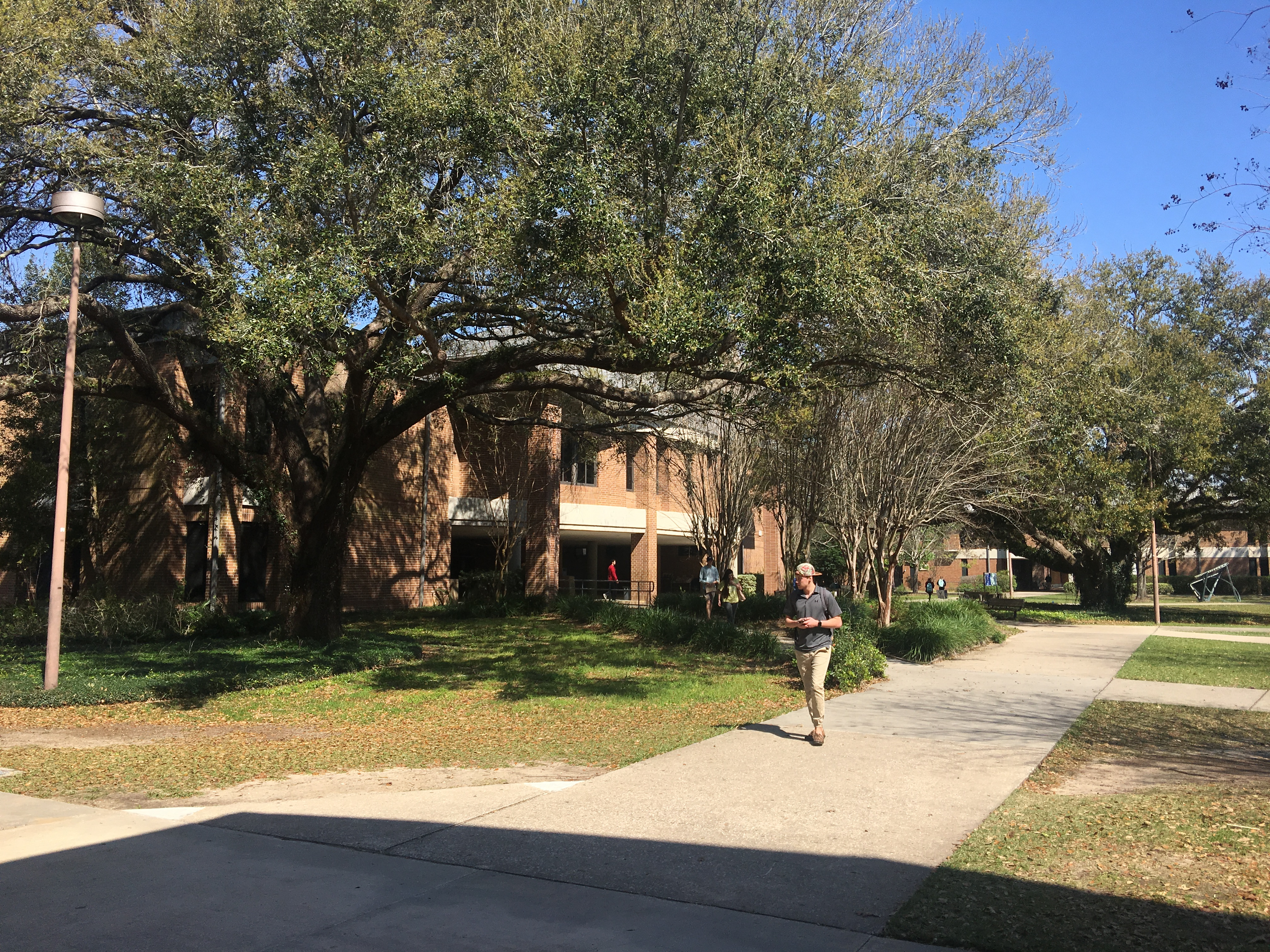
TSC Science and Mathematics Building and courtyard

TSC is home to many student clubs, organizations, academic programs, and teams that provide students the opportunity to get involved on campus. A student newspaper, the Talon, is published at least five times a semester by the students of a journalism class, and a literary magazine, The Eyrie, is published annually. There are no dormitories on campus, so students must find their own off-campus housing.

== Athletics ==
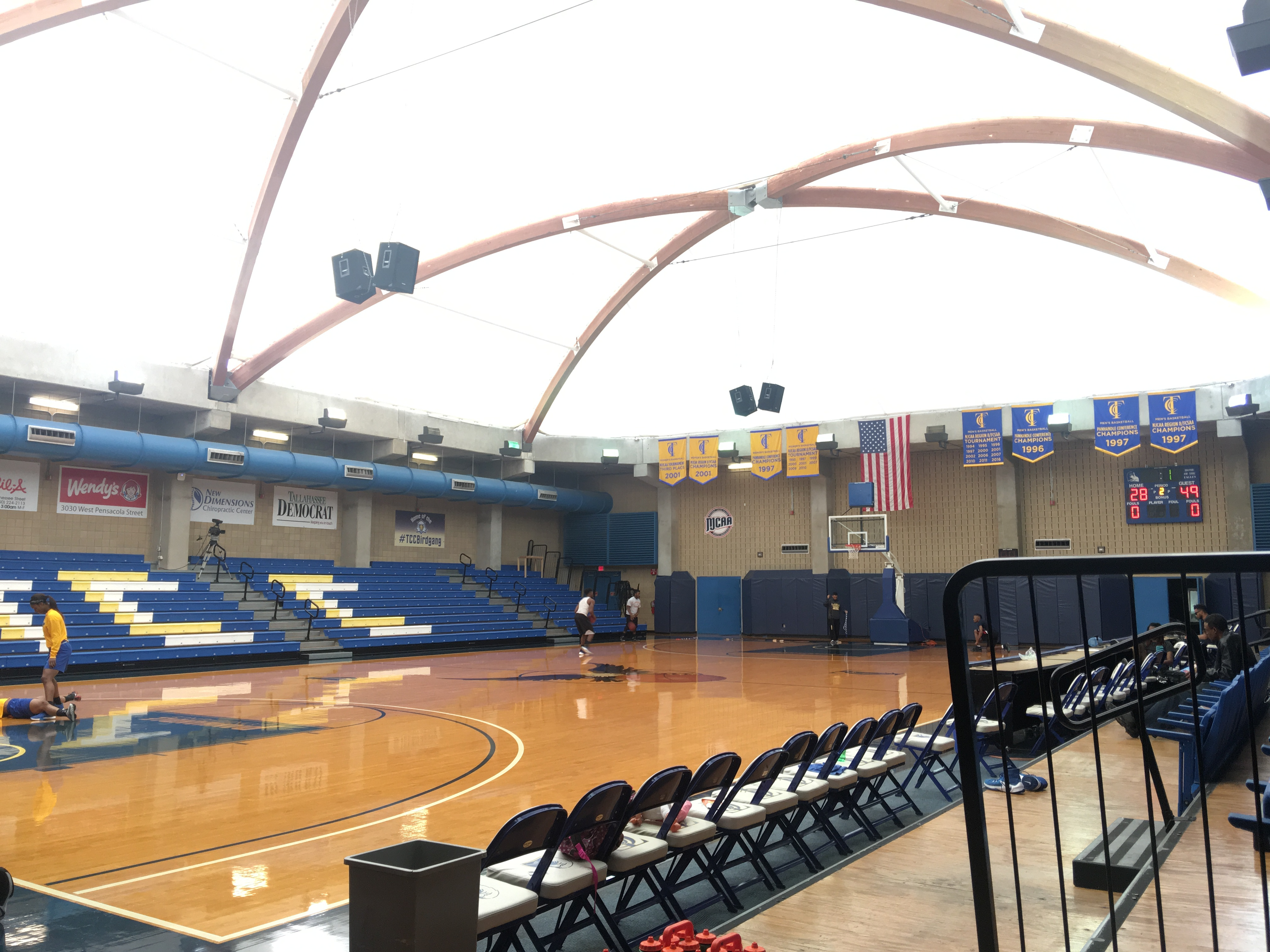
Basketball court in the TSC Lifetime Sports Complex

TSC Athletics include men's basketball, women's basketball, baseball, softball, men's cross country, and women's cross country. The official mascot is the eagle. The school's athletic teams compete in the Panhandle Conference of the Florida College System Activities Association, a body of the National Junior College Athletic Association Region 8.

== Sport dome ==
The Lifetime Sports Complex (LSC) opened in 1976. It is a 70,000-square-foot (6,500 m2) complex located on the west side of campus. The Bill Hebrock Eagledome is one half of the LSC and has been home to TSC Basketball since 1990, when athletics was revitalized.

=== Eagledome ===
The facility was rededicated on November 4, 2011 to honor Bill Hebrock, a trustee and athletic supporter who recently died. The dome contains 812 seats with west side bleacher seats for students and east side chairback seats with a section reserved for boosters.

== Notable alumni ==
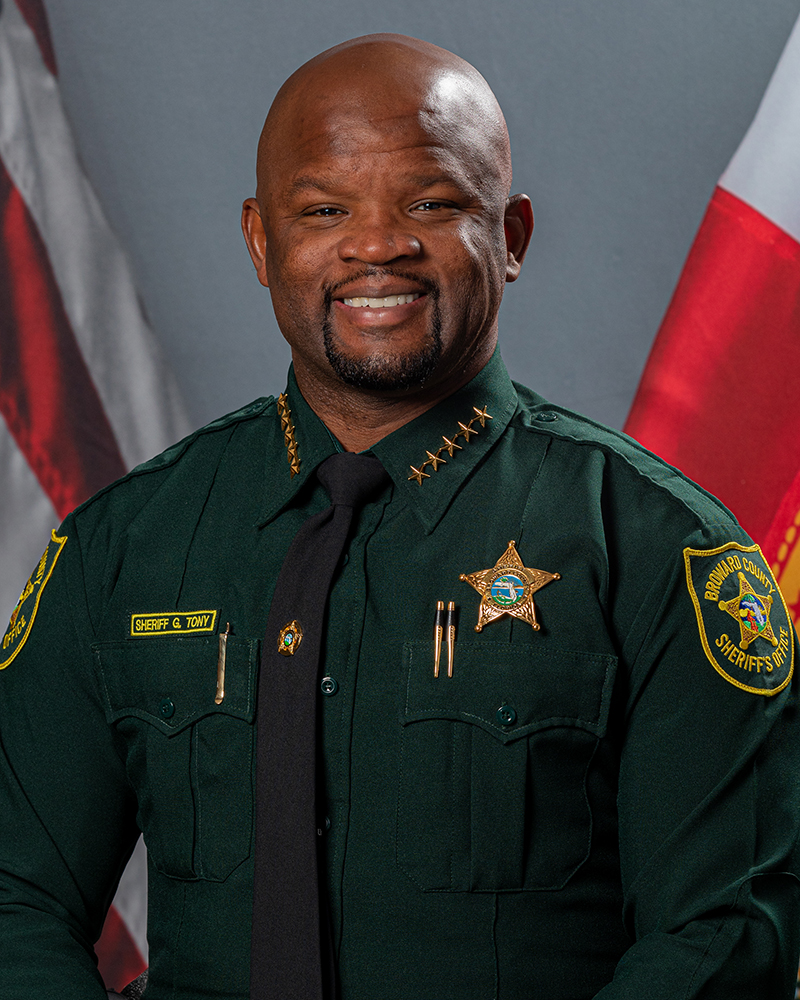
Gregory Tony

- Jason Bennett - professional basketball player
- Lorenzo Cain - professional baseball player
- John Crawford - author
- Ryan Freel - professional baseball player
- Clay Harvison - professional mixed martial artist
- Marcus Hatten - professional basketball player
- Cheryl Hines - actress, comedian, producer and director
- Bernard James - professional basketball player
- Michael Saunders - professional baseball player
- Bootsy Thornton - professional basketball player
- Gregory Tony - Sheriff of Broward County, Florida
