= Gallon (disambiguation) =

A gallon is unit of measurement for volume

Gallon may refer to:

- Gallon (Scots), unit of measurement
- Wine gallon, unit of measurement
- Gallon (surname)
- Gallon, a.k.a. Jon Talbain, a fictional character from the video game series Darkstalkers
- A misspelling of Galloon

== See also ==
Galon (disambiguation)
