= J. David Armstrong Jr. =

American academic

J. David Armstrong, Jr.

6th President of Broward College
- In office 2007–2018
- Preceded by: Will Holcombe
- Succeeded by: Gregory Adam Haile

First Chancellor of the Florida College System
- In office 2001–2006

Personal details
- Born: Alabama
- Education: Harvard Kennedy School; Troy State University; University of Montevallo

J. David Armstrong Jr. is an American academic, and the sixth president of Broward College, a community college with 63,000 students across 11 campuses and centers in South Florida. Armstrong has more than 33 years of experience as a state and national leader in higher education and economic development, and served as President of Broward College for 11 years.

== College leadership ==
Under Armstrong's leadership, Broward College has been ranked among the top community colleges in the country. In 2017, the college was recognized as one of the top three community and state colleges in the nation when it was named a "Finalist with Distinction" by the Washington D.C.–based Aspen Institute. It also ranks second in a new list of the 50 Best Community Colleges for 2017 published by College Choice, a leading authority in higher education rankings and resources. Broward College is consistently in the top five producers of associate degrees and the top producer of industry certifications in Florida for the last four years.

With a strong commitment to the community, a business owner's understanding of the evolving workforce landscape and the changing role of higher education, President Armstrong has led a redesign of the college to focus on new programs that better address skills gaps for students and employers. Several workforce bachelor's degrees, for example, have been added in the fields of information technology, nursing, supply chain management, education, and aerospace science.

In a challenging financial environment where colleges face state budget reductions, Armstrong managed to balance the budget while prioritizing initiatives for student success. This includes spearheading programs that focus on the entire student experience from prospects to post-graduation. While most colleges and universities implemented significant cost increases to students, Broward College under his leadership increased tuition only once in the last five years, maintaining an affordable value and increasing number of programs with no textbook costs.

=== Pathways@BC ===
In addition to new technologies and leading-edge facilities, Armstrong has helped pioneer a revolutionary change to the way students approach and interact with higher education. In 2015, Broward College was selected as one of 30 institutions nationwide to participate in the Pathways Project, led by the American Association of Community Colleges (AACC). Dubbed Pathways@BC, this new academic model combines similar programs and concentrations into learning communities, called Pathways, and changes the way students connect their college experience to future careers with sustainable earnings.

=== Campus expansion ===
Under his leadership, Broward College has expanded access to higher education with new locations and improved facilities such as the Miramar West Center (Aug, 2014), a public private partnership that includes Florida International University, the Health Sciences Simulation Center constructed in (Nov, 2014), a new Aviation Annex at North Perry Airport (Jan, 2017), and a soon-to-be-constructed downtown Fort Lauderdale complex in partnership with Stiles featuring class A office on Las Olas Boulevard. In addition, the college has continued to form international educational partnerships with centers and affiliates in Shanghai, Beijing, Vietnam, Sri Lanka, Peru, Ecuador, Colombia, Bolivia, and others under development.

== Professional organizations ==
President Armstrong serves in a variety of positions with non-profit, workforce and educational organizations, including:

- Co-chair for the Greater Fort Lauderdale Alliance Six Pillars Economic Program
- Broward Workshop Board of Directors
- Broward College Foundation Board of Directors
- Council for International Exchange of Scholars (CIES), Fulbright Scholar Program Board of Directors
- Past chairman of Leadership Florida and the Greater Fort Lauderdale Alliance.

== Awards and recognition ==
He has been recognized for his influential work and service in the business community, receiving several awards, including:

- Association of Community College Trustees (ACCT) “Southern Region CEO/President of the Year"
- Symphony of the Americas “Style and Substance”
- Leadership Broward Foundation “Profiles in Leadership”
- The Seafarer's House “South Florida Business Leader of the Year”
- South Florida Business Journal “Diamond CEO Award”
- South Florida Business and Wealth “Apogee Award”
- Urban League of Broward County “Diversity Champion Award”
- South Florida Business Journal “Power Leader”
- Gold Coast Magazine’s “50 Most Powerful People in Broward County” a
- Greater Fort Lauderdale Chamber of Commerce 2017 Hall of Fame Honoree

Armstrong graduated with his master's degree from Troy State University in Management and his bachelor's degree in Social Science from the University of Montevallo. He is a graduate of the Program for Senior Executives in State and Local Government from Harvard Kennedy School at Harvard University. Prior to this position, Armstrong was the Chancellor of the Florida College System from 2001 to 2006.

Academic offices
Preceded by Willis N. Holcombe	Broward College President; 2006–18	Succeeded by Gregory Adam Haile
