= List of Baldwin Wallace University people =

This is a list of notable individuals who have or had an association with Baldwin Wallace University, located in Berea, Ohio. Baldwin Wallace University is a private college that enjoys a long and rich affiliation with the United Methodist Church. This includes faculty, alumni and staff. The college is located in the greater Cleveland, Ohio area in the United States. The college and town of Berea were founded by Methodist settlers from Connecticut.

The list includes faculty, alumni, staff, and former university presidents. It includes people affiliated with the university under its past names such as Baldwin–Wallace College, Baldwin University, Baldwin Institute and German Wallace College. This list also includes alumni of the Baldwin Wallace Conservatory of Music.

== Alumni ==
=== Academia ===
- Clinton E. Adams, former medical school dean at Western University of Health Sciences; president of Rocky Vista University
- Wayne G. Hammond, J.R.R. Tolkien scholar
- Willis N. Holcombe, chancellor of Florida Community Colleges System; president of Broward College
- William Kelso, archeologist, discoverer of the original Jamestown colony in Virginia
- Drew Meyer, John Teagle Professorial Fellow in Chemistry at Case Western Reserve University
- Larry Shinn, president of Berea College, Kentucky
- Philip L. White, nationality scholar and political activist in Austin, Texas

=== Leadership and politics ===
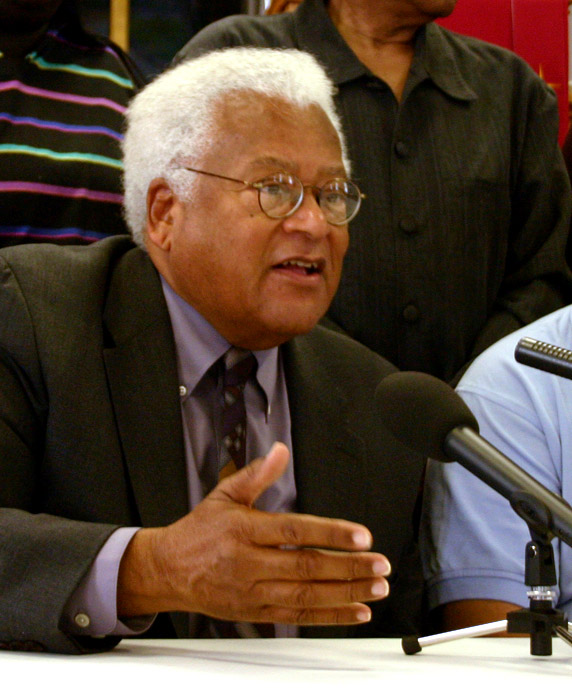
James Lawson speaking at a community meeting in Nashville, Tennessee in 2005

- Nan Baker, member of Ohio House of Representatives
- Henderson H. Carson, U.S. representative from Ohio
- Genevieve R. Cline, first female United States federal judge
- Mike Dovilla, member of Ohio House of Representatives
- William L. Fiesinger, U.S. representative from Ohio
- George L. Forbes, Cleveland City Council president, member of Baldwin-Wallace Board of Trustees
- Chester K. Gillespie, civil rights lawyer and Ohio state representative from Cleveland
- Jane Edna Hunter, L.B. 1925, founder of the Phyllis Wheatley Center for the poor in Cleveland, Ohio
- Jay Ford Laning, U.S. representative from Ohio
- James Lawson, civil rights leader and minister, worked alongside Martin Luther King in the Southern Baptist Leadership Conference
- Charles O. Lobeck, U.S. representative from Nebraska
- Myra McDaniel, first African-American secretary of state of Texas
- Eugene Miller, former member of Ohio House of Representatives
- Peter Neffenger, nominated by President Barack Obama in 2015 to lead the Transportation Security Administration
- George Norris, U.S. senator from Nebraska, creator of the Tennessee Valley Authority, creator of the Nebraska unicameral legislature, and author of the 20th Amendment to the U.S. Constitution
- Miner Norton, U.S. representative from Ohio
- William Skiles, U.S. representative from Ohio
- Martin Sweeney, U.S. representative from Ohio
- Robert E. Sweeney, U.S. representative from Ohio
- Stanley Tolliver, Sr., legal counsel for Rev. Martin Luther King, Jr., Southern Christian Leadership Conference, and Congress of Racial Equality, and survivor and activist of the Kent State shooting
- Harriet G. Walker, vice president of Woman's Christian Temperance Union
- Hazel Mountain Walker, L.B. 1919, among the first African-American lawyers in the state of Ohio
- Amos Webber, judge; biographer of college founder John Baldwin; U.S. representative from Ohio

=== Media and entertainment ===
- Steven Caple Jr., film director, producer, screenwriter, most known for The Land and Creed II
- Claudia Jordan, model, actress, on CBS game show The Price is Right from 2001 to 2003, and "model #1" on the US version of Deal or No Deal

=== Music and arts ===
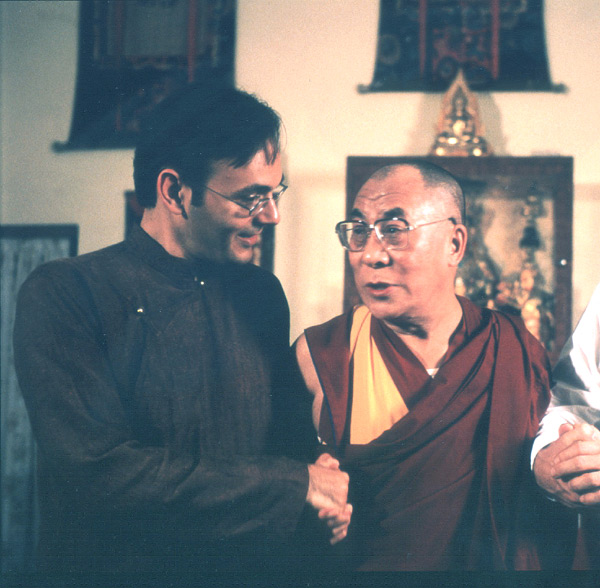
Producer-director Khashyar Darvich with the Dalai Lama in India during filming of the Dalai Lama Renaissance documentary

- Rich Brenner, sportscaster
- Khashyar Darvich, film director and producer, Dalai Lama Renaissance
- Kyle Jean-Baptiste, Broadway actor
- Nancy McArthur, children's author best known for The Plant That Ate Dirty Socks
- Chris McCarrell, Broadway actor
- James Meena, conductor and opera administrator
- Bill Moffit, marching band director, composer, inventor of the "Moffit Squares" band drill
- James Montgomery, composer and arts administrator
- Jill Paice, Broadway actress
- Rebecca Pitcher, musical theatre actress, Christine in Andrew Lloyd Webber's The Phantom of the Opera
- Ciara Renée, Broadway actress, singer, and musician
- Albert Riemenschneider (1878–1950), founder of the Baldwin-Wallace Conservatory of Music
- Kate Rockwell, Broadway actress, singer, and musician
- Colton Ryan, Broadway and television actor and singer

=== Sports ===
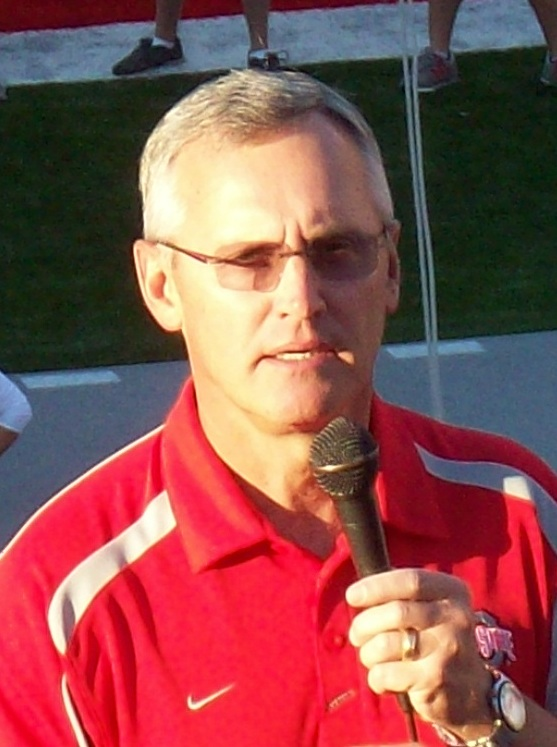
Jim Tressel

- Hank Allen, Major League Baseball player
- Bud Collins, veteran CBS Sports tennis announcer
- Harrison Dillard, 1947, U.S. Olympic gold medalist in 100 meter dash and hurdles; charter member of the U.S. Olympic Hall of Fame
- Tim Graham, sports journalist for ESPN.com
- Wynn Hawkins, Major League Baseball pitcher
- Norb Hecker, first coach of the Atlanta Falcons; won 8 NFL championships as a coach of the Green Bay Packers, San Francisco 49ers, and New York Giants
- Ryan Hulings, NCAA Division 1 soccer coach
- Donna Kelce, mother of Jason and Travis Kelce
- Tonia Kwiatkowski, bronze and silver medalist in US Figure Skating Championships; finished 6th at the 1998 World Championships
- Scott Medvin, Major League Baseball pitcher
- Scott Shafer, former head coach of the Syracuse Orange football team
- Jim Tressel, 2002 National Championship-winning former Coach of the Ohio State University football team; former president of Youngstown State University; current Lieutenant Governor of Ohio
- Matt Underwood, play-by-play announcer for the Cleveland Indians on SportsTime Ohio

=== Other ===
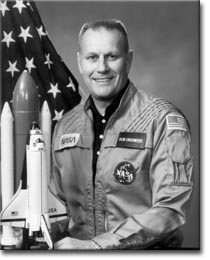
Robert F. Overmyer

- David Ferrie, allegedly involved in John F. Kennedy's assassination
- R. Hardy Juchli, physician and chief medical officer at the Nuremberg Military Tribunal
- Robert F. Overmyer, NASA astronaut
- T. B. Walker, businessman, lumberman, art collector

== Faculty ==
- Roger Bacon, physics professor 1959–71; inventor of carbon fiber in 1958
- Robert Crosser, U.S. representative from Ohio; taught law for two years
- Jane Eaglen, soprano with Metropolitan opera, professor of voice
- Eric Fingerhut, director of economic development education and entrepreneurship, state chancellor of Higher Education
- John Louis Nuelsen, first (1899) to hold the Nast Theological Professorship, bishop of the Methodist Episcopal Church
- Thomas Sutton, political analyst for Cleveland's News Channel 5
- Katharine Mulky Warne, music professor, composer, founder of Darius Milhaud Society

== Staff and administration ==
=== Presidents ===
Baldwin Wallace University has had over 20 people serve as president under the school's various names of Baldwin Wallace University, Baldwin–Wallace College, Baldwin University, German Wallace College and Baldwin Institute.

=== Coaches ===
- Lee Tressel, football coach and athletic director at BW, 1925–1981; inducted into the College Football Hall of Fame in 1996; father of alum and former Ohio State football coach Jim Tressel

==== BW football coaches ====
Name	Term	References
No coach	1893	
No team	1894	
Percy C. Cole	1895	
No team	1896	
F. Smith	1896–1897	
Dave W. Jones	1898–1899	
No team	1900–1902	
E. J. Pfieffer	1903	
No team	1904	
E. J. Pfieffer	1905	
No team	1906	
E. J. Pfieffer	1907–1908	
No team	1909–1911	
F. J. Norton]	1912	
No team	1913–1915	
W. E. Ruetchey	1916	
R. S. Honaker	1917	
V. E. Whitney	1918	
F. Hendershot	1919	
C. E. Cartwright	1920–1921	
R. W. Bechtel	1922–1923	
A. W. Collins	1924–1927	
Ray Watts	1928–1948	
Eddie L. Finnigan	1949–1950	
Louis B. Juillerat	1951–1953	
Paul Adams	1954–1957	
Lee Tressel	1958–1980	
Bob Packard	1981–2001	
John Snell	2002–2016	
Jim Hilvert	2017–present	
