= Gregory Adam Haile =

American education administrator

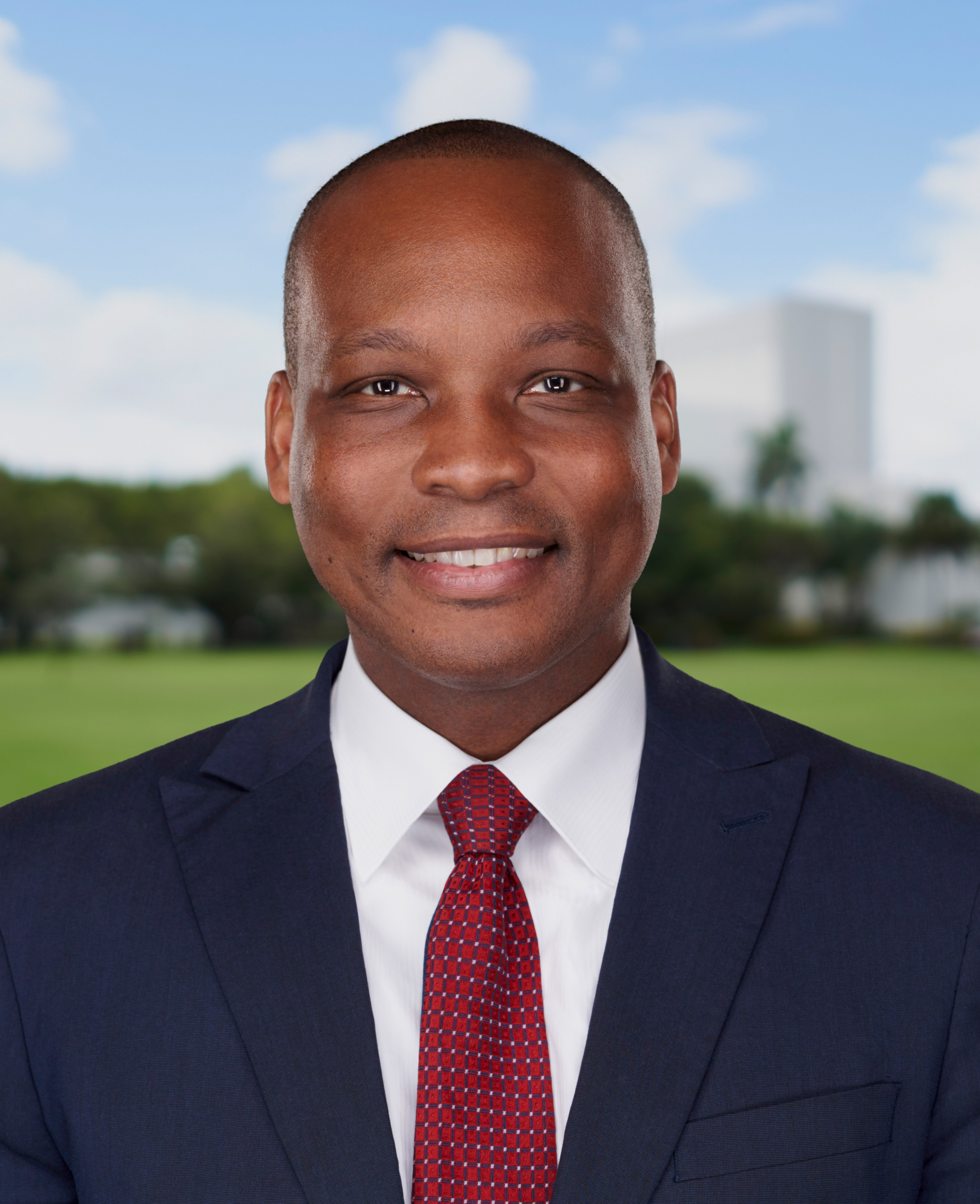

CEO, Upwardly Global; Chairman, Federal Reserve of Atlanta
- Incumbent
- Assumed office January 5, 2026

Personal details
- Born: October 20, 1977 (age 49)
- Spouse: Chae Haile
- Children: 2
- Education: Arizona State University (BA); Columbia Law School (JD); Nova Southeastern University (DHL); Vanderbilt University
- Occupation: Workforce development leader, lawyer, former college administrator

Gregory Adam Haile, J.D. (born October 20, 1977), is the CEO of Upwardly Global, a national workforce development organization that supports U.S. economic productivity and global competitiveness by helping work authorized, highly skilled immigrants restart their careers in the U.S. He is also a senior fellow at the Mossavar-Rahmani Center for Business and Government at the Harvard Kennedy School and Board Chair at the Federal Reserve Bank of Atlanta. Previously, he was a partner at Strategos Group, founder and head of its Higher Ed and Workforce Advisory practice. He previously served as the seventh president of Broward College, part of the Florida College System. Haile started his career as a corporate litigator.

== Early life and education ==
Haile was born on October 20, 1977, in Queens, New York. The first member of his family to attain a post-secondary education degree, Haile graduated magna cum laude with a Bachelor of Arts from Arizona State University, receiving the Most Outstanding Graduate award from his college.

As a Harlan Fiske Stone Scholar, Haile earned a J.D. degree from the Columbia University School of Law in 2002. During law school, he served as editor-in-chief of the National Black Law Journal and editor of the Journal on Gender and Law. He later received an Honorary Doctorate of Humane Letters from Nova Southeastern University and is a fellow of the Vanderbilt University Higher Education Management Institute.

== Career ==
Currently, Haile serves as the CEO of Upwardly Global, leading the organization’s work to grow the US economy by connecting high-skilled work-authorized immigrants with US employers seeking to fill talent gaps. He advises on the role of international professionals in growing the U.S. economy, optimizing the relationship between human capital and AI, building an economy that benefits from all talent.

Building on the work he has been doing during his senior fellowship at Mossavar-Rahami Center, Haile previously guided the Strategos Group’s higher Education and Workforce Training practice in advising private sector companies on go-to-market strategy for products designed to increase economic opportunity, while supporting higher education institutions in their pursuit of innovation.

During the Biden Administration, Haile also served on the U.S.- EU Talent for Growth Task Force. Co-chaired by the U.S. Secretary of Commerce and the U.S. Secretary of State, the task force assembled 6 U.S. leaders from business, labor and education, with counterparts from the EU to build on workforce initiatives from both sides of the Atlantic, to catalyze and advance human capital in technology fields. He was the only college president appointed to the Task Force based on the success of Broward College's many workforce training programs, including bachelors and associate degrees, certificate, apprenticeship, and micro-credentialing programs.

Haile served as the seventh president of Broward College from July 2018-September 2023.

During his investiture (formal installation) speech, Haile announced an expanded business model for Broward College, Broward UP™, with the goal of improving access to higher education for residents in six Broward County ZIP codes with disproportionately high unemployment rates, low education attainment, and low household income.

Under his leadership, Broward College was named a top-10 finalist for the Aspen Prize for Community College Excellence in 2019 and 2021 (with distinction), received $30 million from philanthropist MacKenzie Scott (the largest private gift in its history), and the U.S. Department of Education named Broward UP a Promise Neighborhood, awarding $30 million over five years – the largest grant in the College's history.

Haile served as an adjunct professor with Broward College, teaching Business Law and Ethics in the fall semester of 2014, and with Miami Dade College, teaching Business Law from January 2003 to February 2004. From 2011 to 2018, Haile was the General Counsel and Vice President for Public Policy and Government Affairs at Broward College.

In 2016, 2017, 2019, 2021, and 2022, Haile taught a self-designed 4-credit course in Higher Education Law and Policy at Harvard University.

Florida Governor Ron DeSantis appointed Haile to the State of Florida's Re-Open Task Force, and to the Florida Department of Education Career and Technical Education Advisory Committee on April 22, 2020.

== Professional organizations ==
Haile has served on the board of directors for a variety of corporations, nonprofit organizations, and community groups, such as the Federal Reserve Bank of Atlanta, BBX Capital Corporation, Leadership Florida, Florida Chamber of Commerce, Pace Center for Girls, The Broward Workshop, United Way of Broward County, Greater Fort Lauderdale Alliance, and the Orange Bowl Committee

== Awards and recognitions ==
Haile has been recognized for his work and service in the business community, receiving several awards, including:

- Florida Chamber of Commerce's Florida Chair's Award, 2020
- Aspen Institute Presidential Fellowship for Community College Excellence, 2020–21
- Junior Achievement of South Florida's U.S. President's Volunteer Service Award, 2021
- South Florida Business Journal's Top 250 Power Leaders, 2019–21
- South Florida Business Journal's South Florida Ultimate CEOs, 2021
