= List of Omicron Delta Kappa circles =

The honor society Omicron Delta Kappa, also known as The Circle, uses the term circle to indicate chapters. As of May 4, 2023, 431 circles have been chartered. The practice of designating circles with Greek letter names was abandoned in 1949. In the following list, active circles are indicated in bold and inactive circles are indicated in italics.

#	Circle (chapter)	Charter date and range	Institution	Location	Status	Ref.
1	**Alpha**	December 3, 1914	Washington and Lee University	Lexington, Virginia	Active	
2	**Beta**	May 1, 1916	Johns Hopkins University	Baltimore, Maryland	Active	
3	**Gamma**	June 9, 1916	University of Pittsburgh	Pittsburgh, Pennsylvania	Active	
4	**Delta**	May 24, 1917	Davidson College	Davidson, North Carolina	Active	
5	**Epsilon**	March 12, 1921	University of Richmond	Richmond, Virginia	Active	
6	**Eta**	May 27, 1921	College of William and Mary	Williamsburg, Virginia	Active	
7	**Zeta**	May 28, 1921	Centre College	Danville, Kentucky	Active	
8	**Theta**	April 29, 1922	University of Akron	Akron, Ohio	Active	
9	**Iota**	February 21, 1924	University of Alabama	Tuscaloosa, Alabama	Active	
10	**Kappa**	March 22, 1924	Birmingham-Southern College	Birmingham, Alabama	Active	
11	**Lambda**	April 12, 1924	Hampden-Sydney College	Hampden-Sydney, Virginia	Active	
12	**Mu**	January 24, 1925	Emory University	Atlanta, Georgia	Active	
13	**Nu**	May 4, 1925	University of Kentucky	Lexington, Kentucky	Active	
14	Xi	May 24, 1925 – July 1, 2011	Lehigh University	Bethlehem, Pennsylvania	Inactive	
15	**Omicron**	May 28, 1925	University of Virginia	Charlottesville, Virginia	Active	
16	**Pi**	March 8, 1926	Millsaps College	Jackson, Mississippi	Active	
17	Rho	May 26, 1926 – July 1, 1983	Duke University	Durham, North Carolina	Inactive	
18	**Sigma**	February 2, 1927	University of Maryland	College Park, Maryland	Active	
19	**Tau**	May 15, 1927	Ohio Wesleyan University	Delaware, Ohio	Active	
20	**Upsilon**	May 17, 1927	Dickinson College	Carlisle, Pennsylvania	Active	
21	**Phi**	May 25, 1927	Rhodes College	Memphis, Tennessee	Active	
22	**Chi**	May 29, 1927	University of South Carolina	Columbia, South Carolina	Active	
23	Psi	February 17, 1928 – 19xx ?; April 5, 1997 –July 1, 2008	Allegheny College	Meadville, Pennsylvania	Inactive	
24	**Omega**	May 22, 1928	Auburn University	Auburn, Alabama	Active	
25	**Alpha Alpha**	May 19, 1929	University of the South	Sewanee, Tennessee	Active	
26	Alpha Delta	May 25, 1929	George Washington University	Washington, District of Columbia	Inactive	
27	**Alpha Epsilon**	March 22, 1930	Muhlenberg College	Allentown, Pennsylvania	Active	
28	**Alpha Eta**	May 28, 1930	Georgia Institute of Technology	Atlanta, Georgia	Active	
29	**Alpha Zeta**	May 28, 1930	Tulane University	New Orleans, Louisiana	Active	
30	**Alpha Theta**	March 7, 1931	University of Cincinnati	Cincinnati, Ohio	Active	
31	**Alpha Iota**	March 23, 1931	Rollins College	Winter Park, Florida	Active	
32	Alpha Kappa	February 24, 1933– August 3, 2010	Washington University in St. Louis	St. Louis, Missouri	Inactive	
33	**Alpha Lambda**	March 4, 1933	Randolph–Macon College	Ashland, Virginia	Active	
34	**Alpha Mu**	May 10, 1933	Denison University	Granville, Ohio	Active	
35	**Alpha Beta**	May 12, 1933	Drake University	Des Moines, Iowa	Active	
36	**Alpha Nu**	May 12, 1933	Louisiana State University	Baton Rouge, Louisiana	Active	
37	**Alpha Xi**	May 12, 1933	University of Missouri	Columbia, Missouri	Active	
38	**Alpha Omicron**	June 2, 1933	Virginia Polytechnic Institute and State University	Blacksburg, Virginia	Active	
39	Alpha Pi	March 5, 1934 – July 1, 2010	University of Denver	Denver, Colorado	Inactive	
40	**Alpha Rho**	April 28, 1934	Vanderbilt University	Nashville, Tennessee	Active	
41	**Alpha Sigma**	May 31, 1934 – February 23, 2014	Miami University	Oxford, Ohio	Active	
42	**Alpha Tau**	April 9, 1935	Westminster College (Missouri)	Fulton, Missouri	Active	
43	**Alpha Upsilon**	April 29, 1935	University of Georgia	Athens, Georgia	Active	
44	**Alpha Phi**	February 3, 1936	University of Mississippi	Oxford, Mississippi	Active	
45	**Alpha Chi**	May 22, 1937	Mississippi State University	Starkville, Mississippi	Active	
46	**Alpha Psi**	November 12, 1937	Washington College	Chestertown, Maryland	Active	
47	Alpha Omega	March 12, 1938 – July 1, 1998	American University	Washington, District of Columbia	Inactive	
48	**Beta Alpha**	May 13, 1939	Wake Forest University	Winston-Salem, North Carolina	Active	
49	Beta Beta	June 2, 1939 – July 1, 1996	University of Arkansas	Fayetteville, Arkansas	Inactive	
50	**Beta Gamma**	February 15, 1942	Albion College	Albion, Michigan	Active	
51	Beta Delta	September 19, 1942 – July 1, 1970	Carnegie-Mellon University	Pittsburgh, Pennsylvania	Inactive	
52	**Beta Epsilon**	May 14, 1943	University of Louisville	Louisville, Kentucky	Active	
53	**Beta Zeta**	May 10, 1946	Bucknell University	Lewisburg, Pennsylvania	Active	
54	Beta Eta	June 9, 1946 – July 1, 1996	Wayne State University	Detroit, Michigan	Inactive	
55	Beta Theta	May 8, 1947 – July 1, 1970	Case Western Reserve University	Cleveland, Ohio	Inactive	
56	Beta Iota	May 10, 1947 - June 3, 2023	University of Iowa	Iowa City, Iowa	Inactive	
57	Beta Kappa	May 11, 1947 – June 2, 2022	University of Kansas	Lawrence, Kansas	Inactive	
58	**Beta Lambda**	May 23, 1947	Marshall University	Huntington, West Virginia	Active	
59	**Beta Mu**	June 3, 1947	Grove City College	Grove City, Pennsylvania	Active	
60	**Beta Nu**	November 16, 1947	University of Tennessee	Knoxville, Tennessee	Active	
61	Beta Xi	May 23, 1948 – July 1, 1996	Beloit College	Beloit, Wisconsin	Inactive	
62	**Beta Omicron**	January 18, 1949	Louisiana Tech University	Ruston, Louisiana	Active	
63	**Beta Pi**	February 18, 1949	Centenary College	Shreveport, Louisiana	Active	
64	**Beta Rho**	February 25, 1949	Hillsdale College	Hillsdale, Michigan	Active	
65	Beta Sigma	March 9, 1949 – May 31, 2018	University of Delaware	Newark, Delaware	Inactive	
66	**Beta Tau**	May 22, 1949	Bowling Green State University	Bowling Green, Ohio	Active	
67	**Beta Upsilon**	June 2, 1949	University of Miami	Coral Gables, Florida	Active	
68	Bradley University	April 22, 1949 – July 1, 2010	Bradley University	Peoria, Illinois	Inactive	
69	New Jersey Institute of Technology	May 6, 1950 – June 29, 2019	New Jersey Institute of Technology	Newark, New Jersey	Inactive	
70	Drury University	May 13, 1950 – May 31, 2018	Drury University	Springfield, Missouri	Inactive	
71	**Seminole**	May 13, 1950	Florida State University	Tallahassee, Florida	Active	
72	**University of Nebraska Omaha**	May 20, 1950	University of Nebraska Omaha	Omaha, Nebraska	Active	
73	**Gold Key**	November 16, 1950	Marietta College	Marietta, Ohio	Active	
74	**Samford University**	April 6, 1951	Samford University	Birmingham, Alabama	Active	
75	**Florida Southern College**	April 7, 1951	Florida Southern College	Lakeland, Florida	Active	
76	**Ohio University**	November 10, 1951	Ohio University	Athens, Ohio	Active	
77	**Baldwin-Wallace College**	March 28, 1952	Baldwin-Wallace College	Berea, Ohio	Active	
78	Colorado State University	June 4, 1952 – July 1, 1969	Colorado State University	Fort Collins, Colorado	Inactive	
79	**Stetson University**	May 14, 1953	Stetson University	DeLand, Florida	Active	
80	**University of Redlands**	April 4, 1954 – May 14, 2013	University of Redlands	Redlands, California	Active	
81	Sachem	May 8, 1954 – July 1, 2011	Oklahoma State University	Stillwater, Oklahoma	Inactive	
82	**Kalen-Kixioc**	May 10, 1954	St. Lawrence University	Canton, New York	Active	
83	University of Wyoming	May 16, 1954 – July 1, 2012	University of Wyoming	Laramie, Wyoming	Inactive	
84	**University of Southern Mississippi**	May 26, 1954	University of Southern Mississippi	Hattiesburg, Mississippi	Active	
85	**University Park**	May 15, 1955 – July 1, 2016	Pennsylvania State University	State College, Pennsylvania	Inactive	
86	University of Oklahoma	May 21, 1955 – July 1, 2008	University of Oklahoma	Norman, Oklahoma	Inactive	
87	University of Hawaii	May 22, 1955 – July 1, 1968	University of Hawaii	Manoa, Hawaii	Inactive	
88	Willamette University	May 22, 1955 – July 1, 2000	Willamette University	Salem, Oregon	Inactive	
89	**University of Missouri-Kansas City**	December 9, 1956	University of Missouri-Kansas City	Kansas City, Missouri	Active	
90	University of South Dakota	March 24, 1957 – June 29, 2019	University of South Dakota	Vermillion, South Dakota	Inactive	
91	Western Michigan University	May 17, 1958 – July 1, 1982	Western Michigan University	Kalamazoo, Michigan	Inactive	
92	Washington State University	December 12, 1959 – July 1, 2004	Washington State University	Pullman, Washington	Inactive	
93	University of Louisiana at Monroe	March 1, 1960 – July 1, 2015	University of Louisiana at Monroe	Monroe, Louisiana	Inactive	
94	**Central Methodist University**	April 23, 1960	Central Methodist University	Fayette, Missouri	Active	
95	**University of Houston**	April 24, 1960	University of Houston	Houston, Texas	Active	
96	**Mississippi College**	April 25, 1960	Mississippi College	Clinton, Mississippi	Active	
97	Westminster College	May 21, 1960 – July 1, 2015	Westminster College	New Wilmington, Pennsylvania	Inactive	
98	Whittier College	May 21, 1960 – May 31, 2018	Whittier College	Whittier, California	Inactive	
99	**Wagner College**	May 28, 1960	Wagner College	Staten Island, New York	Active	
100	Kendall	April 29, 1961 – July 1, 2015	University of Tulsa	Tulsa, Oklahoma	Inactive	
101	**Century**	May 21, 1961 – April 29, 2016	Purdue University	West Lafayette, Indiana	Active	
102	**Black Key**	April 14, 1962	Hiram College	Hiram, Ohio	Active	
103	University of Illinois at Urbana-Champaign	May 12, 1962 – July 1, 1996	University of Illinois at Urbana-Champaign	Urbana, Illinois	Inactive	
104	**Augustana College**	May 13, 1962	Augustana College (IL)	Rock Island, Illinois	Active	
105	**Baylor University**	May 19, 1962	Baylor University	Waco, Texas	Active	
106	**Gold Key**	April 21, 1963	Pittsburg State University	Pittsburg, Kansas	Active	
107	**University of Memphis**	May 17, 1963	University of Memphis	Memphis, Tennessee	Active	
108	**Oklahoma Baptist University**	May 19, 1963	Oklahoma Baptist University	Shawnee, Oklahoma	Active	
109	**McDaniel College**	May 25, 1963	McDaniel College	Westminster, Maryland	Active	
110	Michigan State University	May 26, 1963 – July 1, 1996	Michigan State University	East Lansing, Michigan	Inactive	
111	**West Virginia Wesleyan College**	May 26, 1963	West Virginia Wesleyan College	Buckhannon, West Virginia	Active	
112	**Erskine College**	April 19, 1964	Erskine College	Due West, South Carolina	Active	
113	Bowman	October 22, 1965 – July 1, 2011	Kent State University	Kent, Ohio	Inactive	
114	Illinois State University	May 7, 1966 – July 1, 2006	Illinois State University	Normal, Illinois	Inactive	
115	University of Texas at Austin	May 19, 1966 – July 1, 1996	University of Texas at Austin	Austin, Texas	Inactive	
116	Alma College	May 12, 1967 – June 2, 2022	Alma College	Alma, Michigan	Inactive	
117	**Georgia State University**	April 5, 1968	Georgia State University	Atlanta, Georgia	Active	
118	University of Florida	May 17, 1968 – June 29, 2019	University of Florida	Gainesville, Florida	Inactive	
119	University of Colorado at Boulder	May 11, 1969 – July 1, 1971	University of Colorado at Boulder	Boulder, Colorado	Inactive	
120	**Ohio Northern University**	January 22, 1970	Ohio Northern University	Ada, Ohio	Active	
121	**Murray State University**	February 15, 1970	Murray State University	Murray, Kentucky	Active	
122	**University of South Florida**	May 20, 1970	University of South Florida	Tampa, Florida	Active	
123	**University of New Orleans**	March 26, 1971	University of New Orleans	New Orleans, Louisiana	Active	
124	**Ferris State University**	April 18, 1971	Ferris State University	Big Rapids, Michigan	Active	
125	**Valdosta State University**	April 24, 1971	Valdosta State University	Valdosta, Georgia	Inactive	
126	**Western Kentucky University**	April 24, 1971	Western Kentucky University	Bowling Green, Kentucky	Active	
127	Wichita State University	May 2, 1971 – July 1, 2010	Wichita State University	Wichita, Kansas	Inactive	
128	**Delta State University**	May 23, 1971	Delta State University	Cleveland, Mississippi	Active	
129	**Louisiana College**	December 10, 1971	Louisiana Christian University	Pineville, Louisiana	Active	
130	**Texas Tech University**	January 29, 1972	Texas Tech University	Lubbock, Texas	Active	
131	**North Carolina Wesleyan College**	February 11, 1972	North Carolina Wesleyan College	Rocky Mount, North Carolina	Active	
132	**Houston Christian University**	April 22, 1972	Houston Christian University	Houston, Texas	Active	
133	Westmont College	April 24, 1972 – July 1, 2015	Westmont College	Santa Barbara, California	Inactive	
134	University of Tampa	May 20, 1972 – May 31, 2018	University of Tampa	Tampa, Florida	Inactive	
135	Northern Illinois University	May 21, 1972 – July 1, 1996	Northern Illinois University	DeKalb, Illinois	Inactive	
136	**Troy State University**	May 26, 1973	Troy State University	Montgomery, Alabama	Active	
137	University of Wisconsin–Eau Claire	April 29, 1974 – July 1, 2016	University of Wisconsin–Eau Claire	Eau Claire, Wisconsin	Inactive	
138	Olivet College	May 6, 1974 – June 2, 2022	Olivet College	Olivet, Michigan	Inactive	
139	**University of Central Florida**	May 25, 1975	University of Central Florida	Orlando, Florida	Active	
140	**William Carey College**	May 9, 1975	William Carey College	Hattiesburg, Mississippi	Active	
141	**Tennessee Technological University**	May 30, 1975	Tennessee Technological University	Cookeville, Tennessee	Active	
142	**The College of Charleston**	October 26, 1975 – December 1, 2011	The College of Charleston	Charleston, South Carolina	Active	
143	**Icarus**	November 21, 1975	Embry-Riddle Aeronautical University	Daytona, Florida	Active	
144	**University of Alabama at Birmingham**	November 22, 1975	University of Alabama at Birmingham	Birmingham, Alabama	Active	
145	**Salisbury University**	December 15, 1975	Salisbury University	Salisbury, Maryland	Active	
146	**Elmhurst College**	February 8, 1976	Elmhurst College	Elmhurst, Illinois	Active	
147	**Rider University**	March 6, 1976	Rider University	Lawrence Township, New Jersey	Active	
148	**Wittenberg University**	March 6, 1976	Wittenberg University	Springfield, Ohio	Active	
149	**Mary Baldwin University**	March 28, 1976	Mary Baldwin University	Staunton, Virginia	Active	
150	Morris Brown College	April 2, 1976 – July 1, 1996	Morris Brown College	Atlanta, Georgia	Inactive	
151	**Oglethorpe University**	April 2, 1976	Oglethorpe University	Atlanta, Georgia	Active	
152	**James Madison University**	May 2, 1976	James Madison University	Harrisonburg, Virginia	Active	
153	**Old Dominion University**	May 8, 1976	Old Dominion University	Norfolk, Virginia	Active	
154	**Southwest Missouri State University**	May 9, 1976	Southwest Missouri State University	Springfield, Missouri	Active	
155	**University of Minnesota**	May 23, 1976 – July 1, 2010	University of Minnesota	Minneapolis, Minnesota	Inactive	
156	**University of North Alabama**	October 1, 1976 – January 20, 2021	University of North Alabama	Florence, Alabama	Inactive	
157	**University of South Alabama**	May 21, 1977	University of South Alabama	Mobile, Alabama	Active	
158	**Transylvania University**	May 27, 1977	Transylvania University	Lexington, Kentucky	Active	
159	**Campbell University**	December 2, 1977	Campbell University	Buies Creek, North Carolina	Active	
160	**Elon University**	December 4, 1977	Elon University	Elon, North Carolina	Active	
161	**Radford University**	January 21, 1978	Radford University	Radford, Virginia	Active	
162	Jacksonville State University	February 28, 1978 – May 31, 2018	Jacksonville State University	Jacksonville, Alabama	Inactive	
163	**University of Montevallo**	March 1, 1978	University of Montevallo	Montevallo, Alabama	Active	
164	**Duquesne University**	November 10, 1978	Duquesne University	Pittsburgh, Pennsylvania	Active	
165	**Mansfield University**	December 5, 1978 – June 29, 2019	Mansfield University	Mansfield, Pennsylvania	Inactive	
166	University of West Georgia	April 22, 1979 – June 2, 2022	University of West Georgia	Carrollton, Georgia	Inactive	
167	**Austin Peay State University**	May 4, 1979	Austin Peay State University	Clarksville, Tennessee	Active	
168	University of South Carolina Upstate	May 12, 1979 - July 1, 2008	University of South Carolina Upstate	Spartanburg, South Carolina	Inactive	
169	**Francis Marion University**	October 6, 1979	Francis Marion University	Florence, Alabama	Active	
170	**LaGrange College**	November 11, 1979	LaGrange College	LaGrange, Georgia	Active	
171	**Coastal Carolina University**	March 16, 1980	Coastal Carolina University	Conway, South Carolina	Active	
172	**Arizona State University**	March 21, 1980 – March 21, 2018	Arizona State University	Tempe, Arizona	Active	
173	California State University, Northridge	March 22, 1980	California State University, Northridge	Northridge, California	Inactive	
174	**Auburn University Montgomery**	March 23, 1980	Auburn University Montgomery	Montgomery, Alabama	Active	
175	Michigan Technological University	May 2, 1980 – July 1, 2015	Michigan Technological University	Houghton Michigan	Inactive	
176	**Hollins University**	May 4, 1980	Hollins University	Roanoke, Virginia	Active	
177	**East Tennessee State University**	September 14, 1980 – April 25, 2018	East Tennessee State University	Johnson City, Tennessee	Active	
178	**Virginia Wesleyan College**	April 5, 1981	Virginia Wesleyan College	Virginia Beach, Virginia	Active	
179	**Winthrop University**	April 12, 1981	Winthrop University	Rockhill, South Carolina	Active	
180	**SUNY Plattsburgh**	May 2, 1981	SUNY Plattsburgh	Plattsburgh, New York	Active	
181	**University of Maryland, Baltimore County**	May 3, 1981	University of Maryland, Baltimore County	Baltimore, Maryland	Active	
182	**Furman University**	May 18, 1981	Furman University	Greenville, South Carolina	Active	
183	**Jacksonville University**	October 8, 1981	Jacksonville University	Jacksonville, Florida	Active	
184	**Methodist University**	October 15, 1981	Methodist University	Fayetteville, North Carolina	Active	
185	**Emerald**/**University of North Carolina at Charlotte**	February 24, 1982	University of North Carolina at Charlotte	Charlotte, North Carolina	Active	
186	**University of Alabama in Huntsville**	May 10, 1982	University of Alabama in Huntsville	Huntsville, Alabama	Active	
187	Millikin University	May 19, 1982 – July 1, 1998	Millikin University	Decatur, Illinois	Inactive	
188	**University of Northern Iowa**	December 5, 1982	University of Northern Iowa	Cedar Falls, Iowa	Active	
189	**Eckerd College**	March 20, 1983	Eckerd College	St. Petersburg, Florida	Active	
190	**Morningside College**	May 1, 1983	Morningside College	Sioux City, Iowa	Active	
191	Louisiana State University in Shreveport	May 22, 1983 – June 17, 2017	Louisiana State University in Shreveport	Shreveport, Louisiana	Inactive	
192	**Moravian College**	November 6, 1983	Moravian College	Bethlehem, Pennsylvania	Active	
193	**University of West Florida**	March 4, 1984 – December 10, 1998	University of West Florida	Pensacola, Florida	Active	
194	**Hilary Jo Karp**	March 11, 1984	University of Houston–Clear Lake	Clear Lake, Texas	Active	
195	**Monmouth University**	March 24, 1985	Monmouth University	West Long Branch, New Jersey	Active	
196	Columbia College	April 13, 1985 - June 3, 2023	Columbia College (SC)	Columbia, South Carolina	Inactive	
197	Penn State Erie, The Behrend College	April 19, 1985 – June 2, 2022	Penn State Erie, The Behrend College	Erie, Pennsylvania	Inactive	
198	**Florida International University**	April 21, 1985	Florida International University	Miami, Florida	Active	
199	Fairleigh Dickinson University	April 28, 1985 – July 1, 2004	Fairleigh Dickinson University	Madison, New Jersey	Inactive	
200	**Presbyterian College**	October 26, 1985	Presbyterian College	Clinton, South Carolina	Active	
201	**Bridgewater College**	November 24, 1985	Bridgewater College	Bridgewater, Virginia	Active	
202	Maryville University	February 22, 1986 - June 3, 2023	Maryville University	St. Louis, Missouri	Inactive	
203	**Amber**	March 2, 1986 – May 6, 2012	Virginia Commonwealth University	Richmond, Virginia	Active	
204	**Berry College**	April 19, 1986	Berry College	Mount Berry, Georgia	Active	
205	California State Polytechnic University, Humboldt	April 25, 1986 – July 1, 2012	California State Polytechnic University, Humboldt	Arcata, California	Inactive	
206	**Salem College**	November 7, 1986	Salem College	Winston-Salem, North Carolina	Active	
207	**University of West Alabama**	April 3, 1987	University of West Alabama	Livingston, Alabama	Active	
208	Augsburg University	April 10, 1987 – July 1, 2010	Augsburg University	Minneapolis, Minnesota	Inactive	
209	**University of North Carolina at Asheville**	April 11, 1987	University of North Carolina at Asheville	Asheville, North Carolina	Active	
210	**Clemson University**	April 13, 1987	Clemson University	Clemson, South Carolina	Active	
211	**Golden Crest**	April 26, 1987	Missouri Southern State University	Joplin, Missouri	Active	
212	**Concordia College**	April 27, 1987	Concordia College (Moorhead)	Moorhead, Minnesota	Active	
213	**Towson University**	April 30, 1987	Towson University	Towson, Maryland	Active	
214	Heidelberg University	March 26, 1988 – July 1, 2011	Heidelberg University	Tiffin, Ohio	Inactive	
215	**Creighton University**	May 1, 1988	Creighton University	Omaha, Nebraska	Active	
216	California State University, Fullerton	May 15, 1988 – July 1, 1996	California State University, Fullerton	Fullerton, California	Inactive	
217	Villanova University	September 25, 1988 – June 2, 2022	Villanova University	Philadelphia, Pennsylvania	Inactive	
218	**Randolph College**	April 2, 1989	Randolph College	Lynchburg, Virginia	Active	
219	**Huntingdon College**	April 18, 1989	Huntingdon College	Montgomery, Alabama	Active	
220	**University of North Georgia**	November 15, 1989	University of North Georgia	Dahlonega, Georgia	Active	
221	Southern Oregon University	March 11, 1990 – June 29, 2019	Southern Oregon University	Ashland, Oregon	Inactive	
222	**East Carolina University**	March 18, 1990	East Carolina University	Greenville, North Carolina	Active	
223	**Sincerus Orbis**	April 25, 1990	University of Texas at Arlington	Arlington, Texas	Active	
224	**Simpson College**	May 7, 1990	Simpson College	Indianola, Iowa	Active	
225	**University of South Carolina Aiken**	January 29, 1991	University of South Carolina Aiken	Aiken, South Carolina	Active	
226	**Grand Valley State University**	April 14, 1991	Grand Valley State University	Allendale, Michigan	Active	
227	**Muskingum College**	April 21, 1991	Muskingum College	New Concord, Ohio	Active	
228	East Stroudsburg University	April 21, 1991 – July 1, 2015	East Stroudsburg University	East Stroudsburg, Pennsylvania	Inactive	
229	**University of St. Thomas**	April 27, 1991	University of St. Thomas	Saint Paul, Minnesota	Active	
230	**State University of New York at Oneonta**	April 29, 1992	State University of New York at Oneonta	Oneonta, New York	Active	
231	**Aurora University**	May 2, 1992	Aurora University	Aurora, Illinois	Active	
232	**Carthage College**	May 12, 1992	Carthage College	Kenosha, Wisconsin	Active	
233	Gannon University	November 22, 1992 – July 1, 2006	Gannon University	Erie, Pennsylvania	Inactive	
234	**Susquehanna University**	December 10, 1992	Susquehanna University	Selinsgrove, Pennsylvania	Active	
235	University of California, Riverside	April 7, 1994	University of California, Riverside	Riverside, California	Inactive	
236	**Truman State University**	May 2, 1994	Truman State University	Kirksville, Missouri	Active	
237	**Eastern Connecticut State University**	May 13, 1994	Eastern Connecticut State University	Windham, Connecticut	Active	
238	University of Virginia's College at Wise	September 3, 1994 – July 1, 2015	University of Virginia's College at Wise	Wise, Virginia	Inactive	
239	Appalachian State University	March 24, 1995 - June 3, 2023	Appalachian State University	Boone, North Carolina	Inactive	
240	**Harding University**	April 20, 1995	Harding University	Searcy, Arkansas	Active	
241	**Brenau University**	April 22, 1995	Brenau University	Gainesville, Georgia	Active	
242	**State University of New York at Oswego**	May 5, 1995	State University of New York at Oswego	Oswego, New York	Active	
243	**Elmira College**	May 21, 1995	Elmira College	Elmira, New York	Active	
244	**Marymount Manhattan College**	February 12, 1996	Marymount Manhattan College	New York, New York	Active	
245	**Christopher Newport University**	March 29, 1996	Christopher Newport University	Newport News, Virginia	Active	
246	Northern Kentucky University	April 13, 1996–July 1, 2008	Northern Kentucky University	Highland Heights, Kentucky	Inactive	
247	**Georgetown College**	April 14, 1996	Georgetown College	Georgetown, Kentucky	Active	
248	University of Dayton	April 21, 1996 – July 1, 2016	University of Dayton	Dayton, Ohio	Inactive	
249	**Roanoke College**	April 24, 1996	Roanoke College	Salem, Virginia	Active	
250	**Cumberland University**	April 27, 1996	Cumberland University	Lebanon, Tennessee	Active	
251	University of Toledo	October 25, 1996 – July 1, 2015	University of Toledo	Toledo, Ohio	Inactive	
252	**Newberry College**	November 9, 1996	Newberry College	Newberry, South Carolina	Active	
253	**University of Lynchburg**	February 22, 1997	University of Lynchburg	Lynchburg, Virginia	Active	
254	**Flagler College**	March 9, 1997	Flagler College	St. Augustine, Florida	Active	
255	Gettysburg College	April 6, 1997 - June 3, 2023	Gettysburg College	Gettysburg, Pennsylvania	Inactive	
256	**University of North Carolina-Wilmington**	April 20, 1997	University of North Carolina-Wilmington	Wilmington, North Carolina	Active	
257	**Ramapo College of New Jersey**	April 25, 1997	Ramapo College of New Jersey	Mahwah, New Jersey	Active	
258	**Shenandoah University**	April 26, 1997	Shenandoah University	Winchester, Virginia	Active	
259	**Hastings College**	May 4, 1997	Hastings College	Hastings, Nebraska	Active	
260	**Mercer University**	May 9, 1997	Mercer University	Macon, Georgia	Active	
261	Youngstown State University	June 4, 1997–June 17, 2017	Youngstown State University	Youngstown, Ohio	Inactive	
262	**Indiana State University**	March 29, 1998	Indiana State University	Terre Haute, Indiana	Active	
263	Greensboro College	April 23, 1998 – July 1, 2012	Greensboro College	Greensboro, North Carolina	Inactive	
264	Eastern Illinois University	April 25, 1998 – July 1, 2017	Eastern Illinois University	Charleston, Illinois	Inactive	
265	Indiana University Southeast	April 26, 1998 – July 1, 2016	Indiana University Southeast	New Albany, Indiana	Inactive	
266	Waynesburg University	May 2, 1998 – July 1, 2006	Waynesburg University	Waynesburg, Pennsylvania	Inactive	
267	**Carson-Newman College**	May 2, 1998	Carson-Newman College	Jefferson City, Tennessee	Active	
268	**Alfred University**	May 3, 1998	Alfred University	Alfred, New York	Active	
269	Chapman University	May 6, 1998 – July 1, 2016	Chapman University	Orange, California	Inactive	
270	West Virginia State University	May 9, 1998 – July 1, 2011	West Virginia State University	Institute, West Virginia	Inactive	
271	Assumption University	May 10, 1998 – July 1, 2015	Assumption University	Worcester, Massachusetts	Inactive	
272	**University of Nebraska–Lincoln**	November 22, 1998	University of Nebraska–Lincoln	Lincoln, Nebraska	Active	
273	**University of Arizona**	March 28, 1999	University of Arizona	Tucson, Arizona	Active	
274	St. Ambrose University	April 11, 1999 – July 1, 2015	St. Ambrose University	Davenport, Iowa	Inactive	
275	**University of Texas at San Antonio**	April 16, 1999	University of Texas at San Antonio	San Antonio, Texas	Active	
276	Maryville College	April 17, 1999 – July 1, 2014	Maryville College	Maryville, Tennessee	Inactive	
277	**Georgia Southern University**	April 18, 1999	Georgia Southern University	Statesboro, Georgia	Active	
278	Webster University	April 23, 1999 – June 2, 2022	Webster University	St. Louis, Missouri	Inactive	
279	**St. Mary's College of Maryland**	April 25, 1999	St. Mary's College of Maryland	St. Mary's, Maryland	Active	
280	University of Wisconsin-Stevens Point	April 25, 1999 – July 1, 2016	University of Wisconsin-Stevens Point	Stevens Point, Wisconsin	Inactive	
281	**Brevard College**	April 9, 2000	Brevard College	Brevard, North Carolina	Active	
282	**Dillard University**	April 11, 2000	Dillard University	New Orleans, Louisiana	Active	
283	Angelo State University	April 16, 2000 – July 1, 2010	Angelo State University	San Angelo, Texas	Inactive	
284	Bridgewater State University	April 16, 2000 – July 1, 2010	Bridgewater State University	Bridgewater, Massachusetts	Inactive	
285	**Juniata College**	April 18, 2000	Juniata College	Huntingdon, Pennsylvania	Active	
286	**Emmanuel College**	April 19, 2000	Emmanuel College (GA)	Franklin Springs, Georgia	Inactive	
287	**Bellarmine University**	April 27, 2000	Bellarmine University	Louisville, Kentucky	Active	
288	Southeast Missouri State University	April 30, 2000 – June 29, 2019	Southeast Missouri State University	Cape Girardeau, Missouri	Inactive	
289	**West Chester University**	April 30, 2000	West Chester University	West Chester, Pennsylvania	Active	
290	**Franklin College**	May 4, 2000	Franklin College	Franklin, Indiana	Active	
291	**University of Rhode Island**	May 7, 2000	University of Rhode Island	South Kingstown, Rhode Island	Active	
292	**Drexel University**	May 21, 2000	Drexel University	Philadelphia, Pennsylvania	Active	
293	Nicholls State University	November 14, 2000 – June 2, 2022	Nicholls State University	Thibodaux, Louisiana	Inactive	
294	Pennsylvania State University Altoona	December 9, 2000 – July 1, 2016	Pennsylvania State University Altoona	Altoona, Pennsylvania	Inactive	
295	Longwood University	April 23, 2001 – June 29, 2019	Longwood University	Farmville, Virginia	Inactive	
296	**Georgia College and State University**	April 25, 2001	Georgia College & State University	Milledgeville, Georgia	Active	
297	**Morehouse College**	May 1, 2001	Morehouse College	Atlanta, Georgia	Active	
298	Missouri University of Science and Technology	May 10, 2001 – July 1, 2010	Missouri University of Science and Technology	Rolla, Missouri	Inactive	
299	**State University of New York at Potsdam**	May 12, 2001	State University of New York at Potsdam	Potsdam, New York	Active	
300	**McMurry University**	November 4, 2001	McMurry University	Abilene, Texas	Active	
301	Ball State University	April 28, 2002 – June 29, 2019	Ball State University	Muncie, Indiana	Inactive	
302	**Tarleton State University**	April 28, 2002	Tarleton State University	Stephenville, Texas	Active	
303	**Adelphi University**	May 17, 2002	Adelphi University	Garden City, New York	Active	
304	Buffalo State University	November 17, 2002 – July 1, 2012	Buffalo State University	Buffalo, New York	Inactive	
305	Northwest Missouri State University	December 8, 2002 – July 1, 2015	Northwest Missouri State University	Maryville, Missouri	Inactive	
306	**Wilmington College**	February 2, 2003	Wilmington College	Wilmington, Ohio	Active	
307	**Virginia Military Institute**	March 24, 2003	Virginia Military Institute	Lexington, Virginia	Active	
308	University of Southern California	April 27, 2003-July 1, 2010	University of Southern California	Los Angeles, California	Inactive	
309	Fort Hays State University	April 27, 2003 - June 3, 2023	Fort Hays State University	Hays, Kansas	Inactive	
310	Coker University	May 3, 2003 – June 2, 2022	Coker University	Hartsville, South Carolina	Inactive	
311	Fairfield University	May 4, 2003 – July 1, 2010	Fairfield University	Fairfield, Connecticut	Inactive	
312	Bethel University	May 7, 2003 – January 20, 2021	Bethel University (MN)	Saint Paul, Minnesota	Inactive	
313	**University at Albany**	October 26, 2003	University at Albany	Albany, New York	Active	
314	**Stephen F. Austin State University**	November 15, 2003	Stephen F. Austin State University	Nacogdoches, Texas	Active	
315	California Lutheran University	April 18, 2004 – June 17, 2017	California Lutheran University	Thousand Oaks, California	Inactive	
316	**Sweet Briar College**	April 18, 2004	Sweet Briar College	Amherst, Virginia	Active	
317	**College of Idaho**	April 25, 2004	College of Idaho	Caldwell, Idaho	Active	
318	Georgetown University	April 25, 2004 – May 31, 2018	Georgetown University	Washington, District of Columbia	Inactive	
319	**Saint Louis University**	April 25, 2004	Saint Louis University	St. Louis, Missouri	Active	
320	**Widener University**	April 29, 2004	Widener University	Chester, Pennsylvania	Active	
321	Molloy University	April 30, 2004 – July 1, 2010	Molloy University	Rockville Centre, New York	Inactive	
322	**Wright State University**	May 2, 2004	Wright State University	Dayton, Ohio	Active	
323	Central Washington University	May 5, 2004	Central Washington University	Ellensburg, Washington	Inactive	
324	**Worcester State College**	May 14, 2004	Worcester State College	Worcester, Massachusetts	Active	
325	Notre Dame de Namur University	December 12, 2004	Notre Dame de Namur University	Belmont, California	Inactive	
326	**Colorado Christian University**	April 19, 2005	Colorado Christian University	Lakewood, Colorado	Active	
327	Emmanuel College	April 20, 2005 - June 3, 2023	Emmanuel College (MA)	Boston, Massachusetts	Inactive	
328	**Stockton University**	April 24, 2005	Stockton University	Galloway Township, New Jersey	Active	
329	**St. John's University**	May 1, 2005	St. John's University (NY)	Queens, New York	Active	
330	**Bryant University**	May 9, 2005	Bryant University	Smithfield, Rhode Island	Active	
331	**United States Military Academy**	May 13, 2005	United States Military Academy	West Point, New York	Active	
332	**Western New England University**	February 25, 2006	Western New England University	Springfield, Massachusetts	Active	
333	**Armstrong Campus**	April 6, 2006	Georgia Southern University	Savannah, Georgia	Active	
334	**Southwestern University**	April 19, 2006	Southwestern University	Georgetown, Texas	Active	
335	**Nova Southeastern University**	April 23, 2006	Nova Southeastern University	Davie, Florida	Active	
336	San José State University	April 28, 2006 – July 1, 2010	San José State University	San Jose, California	Inactive	
337	**Concordia University Irvine**	April 28, 2006	Concordia University Irvine	Irvine, California	Active	
338	DePaul University	May 20, 2006 – July 1, 2011	DePaul University	Chicago, Illinois	Inactive	
339	Texas Christian University	February 9, 2007 – June 17, 2017	Texas Christian University	Fort Worth, Texas	Inactive	
340	Western Carolina University	March 1, 2007 – July 1, 2015	Western Carolina University	Cullowhee, North Carolina	Inactive	
341	**Hope College**	April 29, 2007	Hope College	Holland, Michigan	Active	
342	University of Central Oklahoma	April 30, 2007 – July 1, 2015	University of Central Oklahoma	Edmond, Oklahoma	Inactive	
343	**University of Massachusetts Lowell**	May 6, 2007	University of Massachusetts Lowell	Lowell, Massachusetts	Active	
344	**University of Baltimore**	May 11, 2007	University of Baltimore	Baltimore, Maryland	Active	
345	**Florida Agricultural and Mechanical University**	April 19, 2008	Florida Agricultural and Mechanical University	Tallahassee, Florida	Active	
346	**Hamline University**	May 4, 2008	Hamline University	Saint Paul, Minnesota	Active	
347	**Campbellsville University**	October 27, 2008	Campbellsville University	Campbellsville, Kentucky	Active	
348	**North Carolina Central University**	November 15, 2008	North Carolina Central University	Durham, North Carolina	Active	
349	**William Woods University**	April 15, 2009	William Woods University	Fulton, Missouri	Active	
350	**Peace College**	April 26, 2009	Peace College	Raleigh, North Carolina	Active	
351	**Georgian Court University**	November 15, 2009	Georgian Court University	Lakewood, New Jersey	Active	
352	**Florida Gulf Coast University**	February 5, 2010	Florida Gulf Coast University	Fort Myers, Florida	Active	
353	**Florida Atlantic University**	April 28, 2010	Florida Atlantic University	Boca Raton, Florida	Active	
354	**Middle Tennessee State University**	April 30, 2010	Middle Tennessee State University	Murfreesboro, Tennessee	Active	
355	SUNY Morrisville	May 4, 2010 - June 3, 2023	SUNY Morrisville	Morrisville, New York	Inactive	
356	**Merrimack College**	February 15, 2011	Merrimack College	Andover, Massachusetts	Active	
357	**SUNY Maritime College**	April 1, 2011	SUNY Maritime College	Bronx, New York	Active	
358	**Chatham University**	October 6, 2011	Chatham University	Pittsburgh, Pennsylvania	Active	
359	**Neumann University**	October 6, 2011	Neumann University	Aston, Pennsylvania	Active	
360	Seton Hall University’”	October 8, 2011 – 20xx ?	Seton Hall University	South Orange, New Jersey	Inactive	
361	**Union College**	October 30, 2011	Union College	Schenectady, New York	Active	
362	**Doane College**	November 29, 2011	Doane College	Crete, Nebraska	Active	
363	**Worcester Polytechnic Institute**	December 5, 2011	Worcester Polytechnic Institute	Worcester, Massachusetts	Active	
364	Thomas Jefferson University	February 12, 2012 – June 2, 2022	Thomas Jefferson University	Philadelphia, Pennsylvania	Inactive	
365	**Ashland University**	March 18, 2012	Ashland University	Ashland, Ohio	Active	
366	**Saint Leo University**	April 11, 2012	Saint Leo University	St. Leo, Florida	Active	
367	**Trinity University**	April 26, 2012	Trinity University (TX)	San Antonio, Texas	Active	
368	**Southern Utah University**	May 2, 2012	Southern Utah University	Cedar City, Utah	Active	
369	Johnson and Wales University	May 3, 2012 – June 29, 2019	Johnson and Wales University	Providence, Rhode Island	Inactive	
370	**Converse College**	May 6, 2012	Converse College	Spartanburg, South Carolina	Active	
371	**United States Naval Academy**	March 7, 2013	United States Naval Academy	Annapolis, Maryland	Active	
372	**Washington Adventist University**	April 14, 2013	Washington Adventist University	Takoma Park, Maryland	Active	
373	**Texas Woman's University**	April 19, 2013	Texas Woman's University	Denton, Texas	Active	
374	**Lincoln Memorial University**	August 24, 2013	Lincoln Memorial University	Harrogate, Tennessee	Active	
375	**University of Washington Tacoma**	November 15, 2013	University of Washington Tacoma	Tacoma, Washington	Active	
376	**Fontbonne University**	November 16, 2013	Fontbonne University	Clayton, Missouri	Active	
377	**Cabrini University**	April 6, 2014	Cabrini University	Wayne, Pennsylvania	Active	
378	**The College of New Jersey**	April 23, 2014	The College of New Jersey	Ewing, New Jersey	Active	
379	**Lake Forest College**	April 27, 2014	Lake Forest College	Lake Forest, Illinois	Active	
380	**University of Tennessee Southern**	May 1, 2014	University of Tennessee Southern	Pulaski, Tennessee	Active	
381	**SUNY Brockport**	May 2, 2014	SUNY Brockport	Brockport, New York	Active	
382	**Guilford College**	November 11, 2014	Guilford College	Greensboro, North Carolina	Active	
383	**Dr. Glenn Hilburn**	December 10, 2014	Dallas Baptist University	Dallas, Texas	Active	
384	**St. Norbert College**	January 31, 2015	St. Norbert College	DePere, Wisconsin	Active	
385	Idaho State University	February 24, 2015 - June 3, 2023	Idaho State University	Pocatello, Idaho	Inactive	
386	**Loyola University New Orleans**	March 23, 2015	Loyola University New Orleans	New Orleans, Louisiana	Active	
387	**Pace University**	April 6, 2015	Pace University	New York, New York	Active	
388	**LIU - Post**	April 12, 2015	Long Island University	Brookville, New York	Active	
389	**Loyola University Maryland**	April 16, 2015	Loyola University Maryland	Baltimore, Maryland	Active	
390	**Staten Island**	April 21, 2015	St. John's University	Staten Island, New York	Active	
391	Pfeiffer University	April 24, 2015 – January 20, 2021	Pfeiffer University	Misenheimer, North Carolina	Inactive	
392	**Belmont University**	April 27, 2015	Belmont University	Nashville, Tennessee	Active	
393	**SUNY Old Westbury**	May 8, 2015	SUNY Old Westbury	Old Westbury, New York	Active	
394	Norwich University	June 6, 2015 - June 3, 2023	Norwich University	Northfield, Vermont	Inactive	
395	**Weber State University**	November 20, 2015	Weber State University	Ogden, Utah	Active	
396	**Southern Virginia University**	March 15, 2016	Southern Virginia University	Buena Vista, Virginia	Active	
397	**New England College**	April 13, 2016	New England College	Henniker, New Hampshire	Active	
398	**Lycoming College**	April 23, 2016	Lycoming College	Williamsport, Pennsylvania	Active	
399	**Agnes Scott College**	April 27, 2016	Agnes Scott College	Decatur, Georgia	Active	
400	**Reno**	April 30, 2016	University of Nevada	Reno, Nevada	Active	
401	**Suffolk University**	May 19, 2016	Suffolk University	Boston, Massachusetts	Active	
402	**Western State Colorado University**	October 20, 2016	Western State Colorado University	Gunnison, Colorado	Active	
403	**University of Mary**	November 17, 2016	University of Mary	Bismarck, North Dakota	Active	
404	**University of Saint Katherine**	January 8, 2017	Saint Katherine College	San Marcos, California	Active	
405	**University of North Carolina at Greensboro**	February 24, 2017	University of North Carolina at Greensboro	Greensboro, North Carolina	Active	
406	**Purdue University Northwest**	April 9, 2017	Purdue University Northwest	Hammond, Indiana	Active	
407	**The Citadel**	May 4, 2017	The Citadel	Charleston, South Carolina	Active	
408	**Camden**	May 7, 2017	Rutgers University	Camden, New Jersey	Active	
409	**Dalton State College**	September 8, 2017	Dalton State College	Dalton, Georgia	Active	
410	Crimson	September 15, 2017–June 2, 2022	Washington State University Tri-Cities	Richland, Washington	Inactive	
411	**Southern Connecticut State University**	October 2, 2017	Southern Connecticut State University	New Haven, Connecticut	Active	
412	**University of Jamestown**	October 5, 2017	University of Jamestown	Jamestown, North Dakota	Active	
413	**Lees-McRae College**	November 28, 2017	Lees-McRae College	Banner Elk, North Carolina	Active	
414	**Xavier University of Louisiana**	April 18, 2018	Xavier University of Louisiana	New Orleans, Louisiana	Active	
415	**Eastern Kentucky University**	April 25, 2018	Eastern Kentucky University	Richmond, Kentucky	Active	
416	**Dickinson State University**	October 26, 2018	Dickinson State University	Dickinson, North Dakota	Active	
417	**SUNY Fredonia**	November 4, 2018	SUNY Fredonia	Fredonia, New York	Active	
418	**University of Holy Cross**	February 15, 2019	University of Holy Cross	New Orleans, Louisiana	Active	
419	**Florida State University Panama City**	April 2, 2019	Florida State University Panama City	Panama City, Florida	Active	
420	**Kentucky State University**	April 22, 2019	Kentucky State University	Frankfort, Kentucky	Active	
421	**Millersville University**	December 2, 2019	Millersville University	Millersville, Pennsylvania	Active	
422	**University of Minnesota Duluth**	October 23, 2020	University of Minnesota Duluth	Duluth, Minnesota	Active	
423	**Wilson College**	November 11, 2020	Wilson College	Chambersburg, Pennsylvania	Active	
424	**Talladega College**	April 21, 2021	Talladega College	Talladega, Alabama	Active	
425	**High Point University**	October 24, 2021	High Point University	High Point, North Carolina	Active	
426	**Lamar University**	March 3, 2022	Lamar University	Beaumont, Texas	Active	
427	**Bethany College**	April 20, 2022	Bethany College	Bethany, West Virginia	Active	
428	**Valparaiso University**	December 5, 2022	Valparaiso University	Valparaiso, Indiana	Active	
429	**Young Harris College**	March 16, 2023	Young Harris College	Young Harris, Georgia	Active	
430	**Union Adventist University**	April 30, 2023	Union Adventist University	Lincoln, Nebraska	Active	
431	**Texas A&M University-Commerce**	May 4, 2023	Texas A&M University-Commerce	Commerce, Texas	Active	
432	**Canisius University**	November 30, 2023	Canisius University	Buffalo, New York	Active	
433	**University of North Carolina at Pembroke**	December 1, 2023	University of North Carolina at Pembroke	Pembroke, North Carolina	Active	
434	**Keiser University**	April 5, 2024	University of North Carolina at Pembroke	West Palm Beach, Florida	Active	
435	**National Circle**	April 24, 2024	Omicron Delta Kappa	Lexington, Virginia	Active	
