= Randall W. Hanna =

Dean of Florida State University Panama City
- Incumbent
- Assumed office August 1, 2016

Personal details
- Born: July 5, 1958 (age 68) Quincy, Florida
- Spouse: Jerri
- Children: Curtis, Grace Ellen
- Education: Florida State University; University of Florida; Emory University; University of Pennsylvania

Randy Hanna is the Dean of Florida State University Panama City and the College of Applied Studies at FSU. He assumed these roles on December 1, 2016, after having served as interim dean since August 2016.

An educator and attorney, Randy Hanna served as Chancellor of the Florida College System from 2011 to 2014. Prior to being named Chancellor of the Florida College System, he served as Chair of the Florida State Board of Community Colleges, Chair of the Florida College System Foundation, and as a member of the Board of Trustees at Tallahassee Community College, Florida A&M University, and the University of West Florida. He served as a member of Florida's Prepaid Tuition Board and the state's Higher Education Coordinating Council.

Prior to taking on the role at Florida State University Panama City, he held faculty appointments at FSU's Learning Systems Institute and College of Education.

Hanna is a lawyer by training. He spent his early career as an attorney at Bryant Miller Olive, a multi-state law firm where he represented clients before state agencies and has worked on numerous projects in the educational, energy and utility areas. He served as counsel of record for, and personally argued, five cases before the Florida Supreme Court. Hanna was the Managing Shareholder of the firm from 1997 to 2011.

Hanna has a B.S. degree from the University of Florida and an M.B.A. from the Goizueta Business School at Emory University. He earned his juris doctor at Florida State University where he was a member of the Law Review and Order of the Coif. Hanna received his Doctorate in Education from the University of Pennsylvania. He has been listed in The Best Lawyers in America and served as Chairman of The Florida Board of Bar Examiners and Chairman of the Tallahassee Area Chamber of Commerce.

He received the "Grad Made Good" award from Florida State University in 2014, was named Leader of the Year by Leadership Tallahassee in 2002 and previously received the Florida Bar President's Pro Bono Service Award. He is rated AV by Martindale Hubbell and has been named one of the "Most Influential Floridians" by Florida Trend Magazine.
