= NWFSC =

NWFSC may refer to:

- Northwest Fisheries Science Center, in Seattle, part of the National Marine Fisheries Service
- Northwest Florida State College, in Niceville, part of the Florida College System
