= Gallon (surname) =

Gallon is a surname. Notable people with the surname include:

- Aguinaldo Roberto Gallon, Brazilian footballer
- Dennis P. Gallon, American academic
- Gary Gallon (1945–2003), Canadian environmental activist
- Johan Gallon (born 1978), French footballer
- Thomas Gallon (1886–1945), Canadian track and field athlete

== See also ==
- Gallo (surname)
