= Wilson G. Bradshaw =

American academic administrator (born 1949)

3rd President of Florida Gulf Coast University in Fort Myers, Florida
- In office August 25, 2007 – June 30, 2017
- Preceded by: William Merwin

Personal details
- Born: April 20, 1949 (age 77) Sanford, Florida
- Spouse: Jo Anna Bradshaw
- Education: Palm Beach State College; Florida Atlantic University; University of Pittsburgh
- Occupation: College president

Wilson G. Bradshaw was the third president of Florida Gulf Coast University.

A native of Sanford, Florida and raised in West Palm Beach, Wilson Bradshaw holds bachelor's and master's degrees in psychology from Florida Atlantic University and a doctorate in psychobiology from the University of Pittsburgh. He is married to Jo Anna and they have three adult sons.

Bradshaw came to FGCU from Metropolitan State University in St. Paul, Minnesota, having previously served as its president for seven years. Prior to that he served as provost and Vice President of Academic Affairs at Bloomsburg University and Dean of Graduate Studies at Florida Atlantic University.

Bradshaw became FGCU president on August 25, 2007, replacing Bill Merwin who resigned after admitting to an extramarital affair with a faculty member.
