= Baldwin Wallace Conservatory of Performing Arts =

Music school in Ohio, U.S.

Coordinates: 41°22′03″N 81°51′07″W

- Former names: Baldwin Institute, Baldwin Wallace Conservatory of Music
- Motto: Excellence... from Bach to Broadway
- Type: Conservatory of Music
- Established: 1899
- Religious affiliation: United Methodist Church
- Academic affiliations: Riemenschneider Bach Institute
- Director: Susan Van Vorst
- Academic staff: 24 full-time and 36 adjunct faculty
- Students: 260
- Location: Berea, Ohio, United States
- Campus: Baldwin Wallace University
- Website: www.bw.edu/academics/conservatory

The Baldwin Wallace Conservatory of Performing Arts is part of the Baldwin Wallace University, in Berea, Ohio. The main building is Kulas Hall. The Conservatory is home to the Baldwin Wallace Bach Festival, the oldest collegiate Bach Festival in the United States. The music theatre program, founded by Victoria Bussert and currently directed by Jennifer Hemphill, draws hundreds of applicants each year. The instrumental programs have produced musicians; several BW alumni play in the Cleveland Orchestra.

== History ==
Today's Baldwin Wallace Conservatory of Performing Arts was established during the Baldwin Institute's existence. The undergraduate-only conservatory was founded in 1898 by Albert Riemenschneider. Before that, the Baldwin Institute offered music classes for one dollar extra per term. In 1912, land donated by the citizens of Berea was used to expand the institution and improve the facilities for music. The Kulas Musical Arts Building was constructed, housing a $25,000 pipe organ.

In 1975 the Conservatory expanded into an adjacent residence hall (Merner-Pfeiffer Hall) and later an enclosed bridge was constructed connecting the two buildings. In 2009, Berea First Congregational Church became part of the college. In 2011, an expansion was done to connect the Kulas Musical Arts Building with the church.

The Baldwin Wallace Conservatory of Performing Arts is home to the BW Bach Festival, the oldest collegiate Bach festival in the nation, as well as the second-oldest Bach festival in the nation. The festival was founded in 1932 by Professor Albert Riemenschneider (longtime Director of the College Conservatory) and his wife, Selma. The then Baldwin-Wallace Festival Choir and Orchestra presented the first Bach Festival in June 1933 and has continued on an annual basis ever since.

In 2007, the nation's oldest Bach Festival, The Bethlehem, and Baldwin Wallace performed together for BW's 75th anniversary of the festival. These two groups have worked together to celebrate the milestones of their festivals. The Bethlehem (Pennsylvania) choir was founded in 1898 by J. Fred Wolle. Riemenschneider, founder of the BW festival, was inspired by a 1931 trip to the Bethlehem Bach Festival. In 2012, internationally heiled Bach scholar Ton Koopman worked with the Conservatory's Motet choir.

In 2023, the university announced that the theatre department, including the B.F.A. in Acting and the B.M. in Musical Theatre, would be moving from the School of Humanities to the conservatory. With this shift, the Conservatory of Music was renamed to the Conservatory of Performing Arts.

== Facilities ==
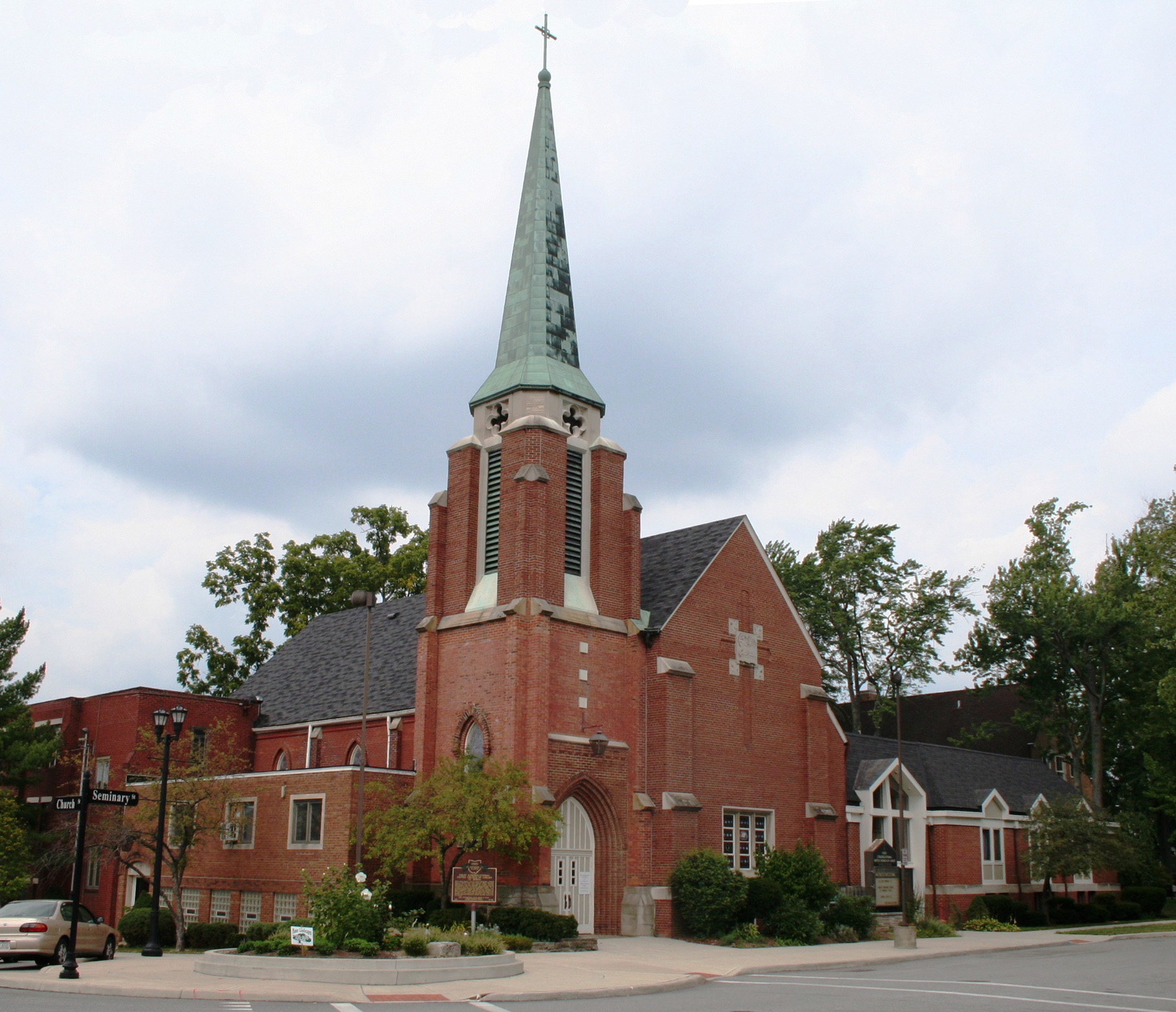
The BBCCM Annex prior to renovation

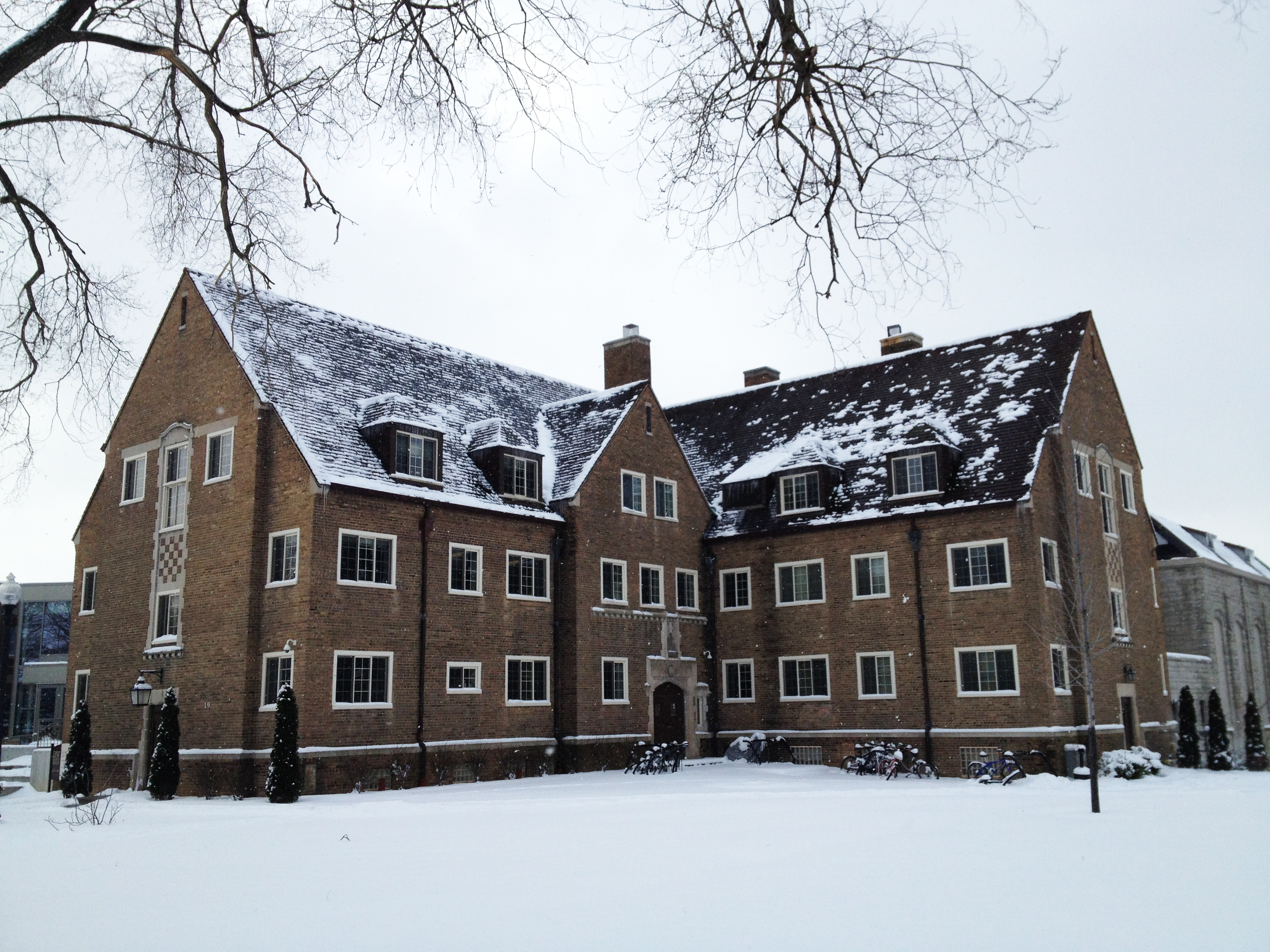
Merner-Pfeiffer Hall opened in 1913

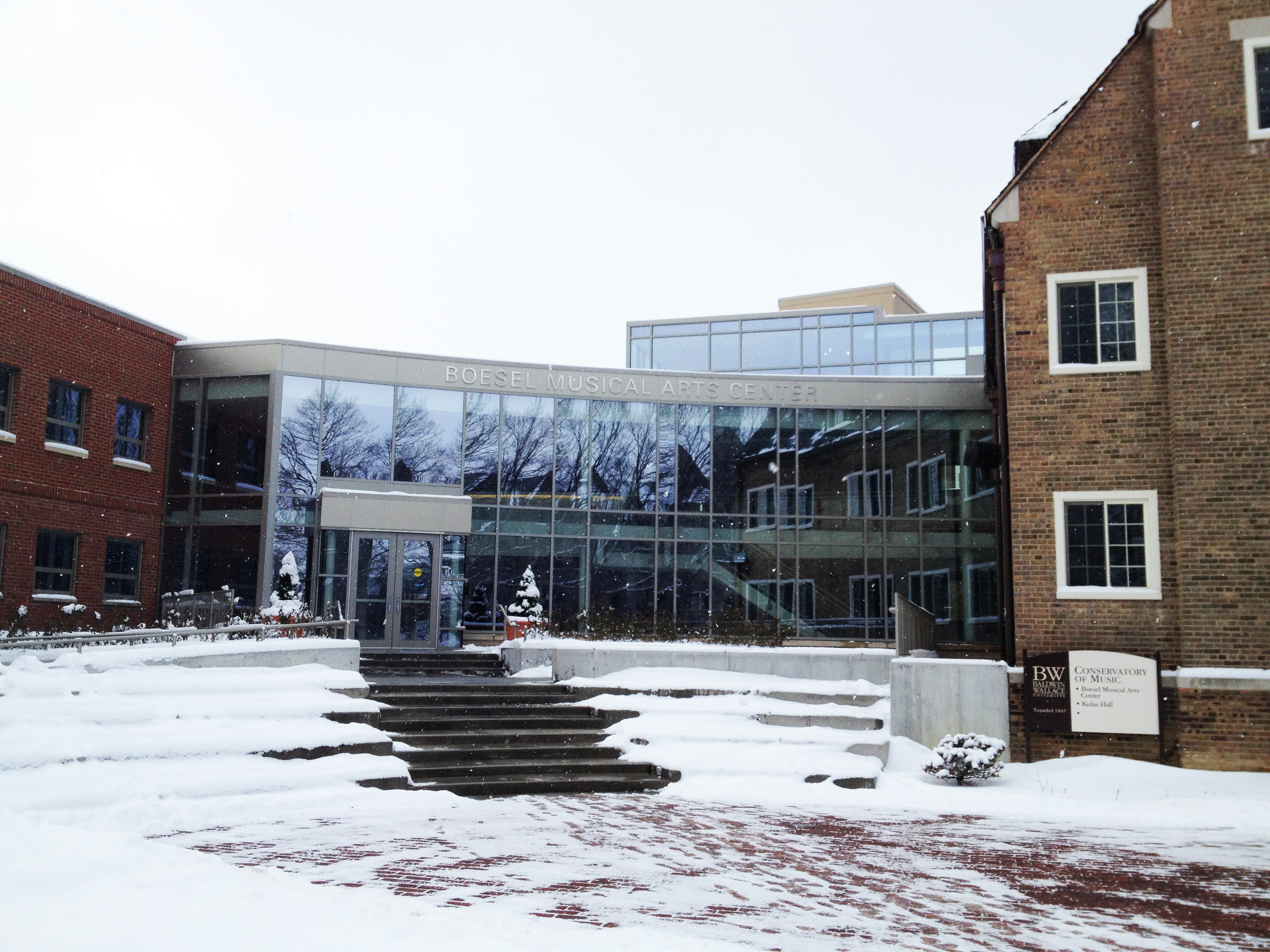
Boesel Musical Center opened in 2011

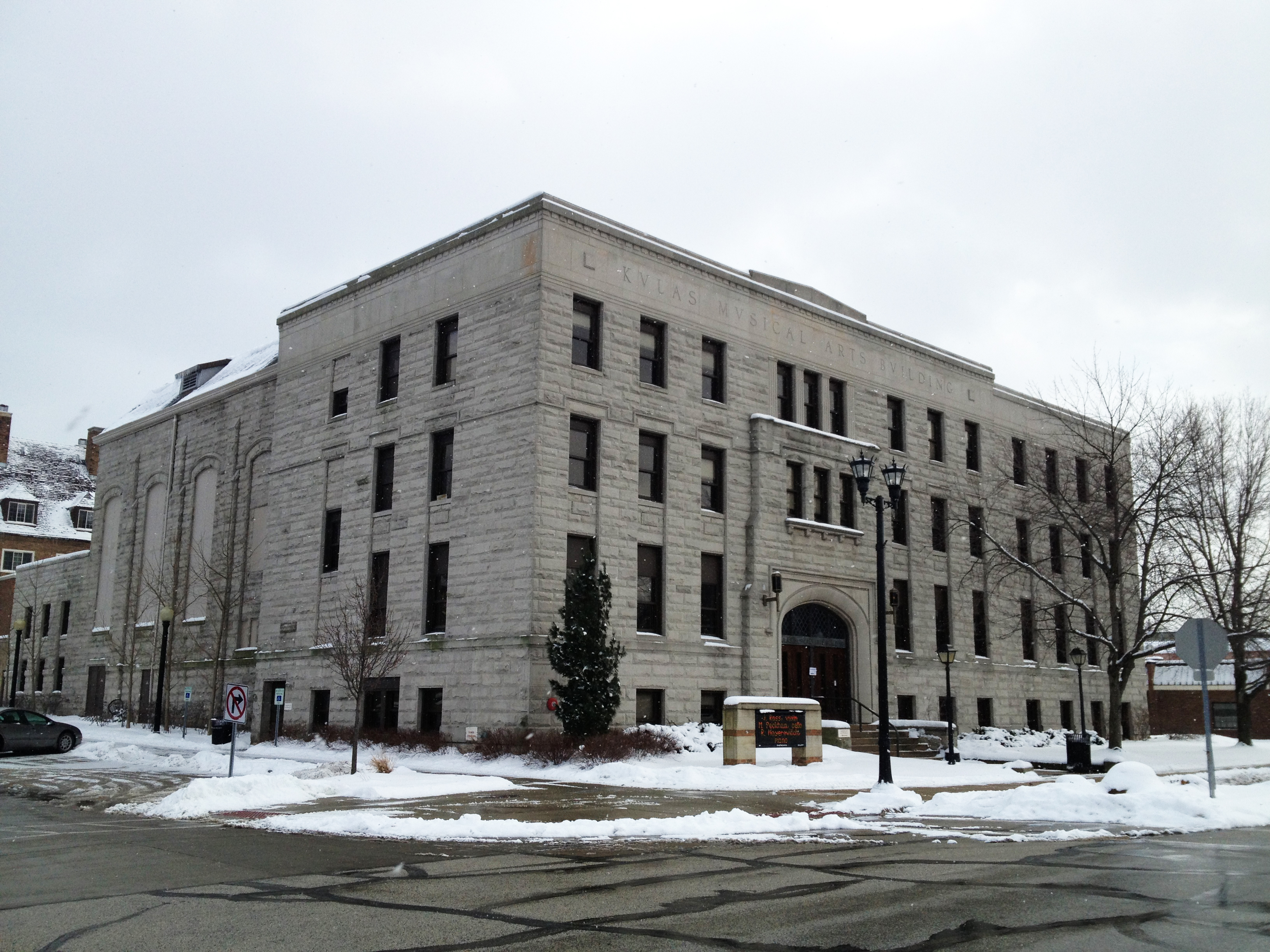
Kulas Hall opened in 1912

The main conservatory buildings include Kulas Musical Arts Building, Merner-Pfeiffer Hall and Boesel Musical Arts Center. The Boesel Musical Arts Center opened in 2011. In the Conservatory's beginnings, Kulas Musical Arts Building was the sole home of the music students, with Merner-Pfeiffer Hall being a very close dormitory in proximity. Eventually, Merner-Pfeiffer was renovated and became a part of the Conservatory buildings. Kohler Hall, a nearby building, houses many conservatory students. Having outgrown its existing facilities in the early 2000s, the Conservatory embarked on a second expansion and renovation project, and in August 2008 acquired the adjacent First Congregational United Church of Christ building. This building was renovated to house conservatory programs and attached to Merner-Pfeiffer Hall via a new connecting structure. The connecting structure and what used to be the United Church of Christ were named Boesel Musical Arts Center.

The Ferne Patterson Jones Music Library is located in the basement of Merner-Pfeiffer Hall. The library contains nearly 40,000 items, including approximately 13,000 volumes of printed music.

The Riemenschneider Bach Institute, located in the Boesel Musical Arts Center, holds a priceless collection of rare materials related to J. S. Bach and his circle. The Riemenschneider Bach Library, a unique collection of Bach-oriented books, manuscripts, archival materials, and scores, includes rare items such as the Emmy Martin Collection of first-edition scores; the Riemenschneider Graduate Library Collection; the Hans T. David Collection of books, manuscripts, archival items, and scores (including a number of first-edition scores); the opera-oriented Tom Villella collection of phonodiscs, books, archival materials, and memorabilia and the Albert and Helen Borowitz Recording Collection (2007). The library also holds a collection of Cleveland Orchestra programs (1902-1974). Currently, the total Bach Institute "volume count" exceeds the 20,000 mark. The institute also publishes BACH: Journal of the Riemenschneider Bach Institute, a scholarly journal, and serves as the research arm of the Baldwin Wallace Bach Festival.

== Programs ==
=== Majors ===
- Music Performance (all instruments including keyboard and voice)
- Music Education
- Music Therapy
- Music History and Literature
- Music Composition
- Music Theatre
- Music in the Liberal Arts

=== Additional Programs ===
- Arts Management
- Music Therapy Equivalency

== Programs ==
=== Bach Festival ===
The Baldwin Wallace Conservatory of Performing Arts is the home of the first Collegiate Bach Festival in the nation. It is the nation's second-oldest Bach festival. It was founded in 1932 by Riemenschneider and his wife, Selma. The festival rotates four major Bach works—the B-minor Mass, the St. John Passion, the St. Matthew Passion, and the Christmas Oratorio—every four years in sequence. Since the festival's inception, Baldwin Wallace's vocal and instrumental students have performed Bach's major choral and orchestral works with a cast of vocal soloists, faculty and local professionals. It has become a three-day event.

=== Music theatre ===
In recent years, BW conservatory of music has become nationally recognized for its top tier musical theatre program. Founded by Victoria Bussert, who parted ways with the university in 2025 to found the music theater program at Oberlin Conservatory of Music, the program at BW has been recognized by many in the theatrical community as one of the best college education programs for musical theatre in the country. The annual senior showcase in New York City has ended with every senior receiving representation from various talent agencies for the past ten years. Jennifer Hemphill is the program's current director, Greg Daniels is the chair of the dance department, and JR Fralick is the chair of the vocal studies department.

=== Rent and La Bohème in Repertory ===
Rent was performed in the spring of 2011. The conservatory presented the Puccini and Larson works in repertory, for the first time in the world, in February 2011, with nearly 80 students from the music theater and voice departments. Some singers performed in both productions. Sharing the same set, "La Boheme," updated to the 1930s, had six performances during the run February 15–27, 2011, at BW's John Patrick Theatre, while "Rent" had ten performances.

=== Phantom of the Opera ===
In 2007, Baldwin Wallace was selected to perform one of six pre-release pilot productions of Andrew Lloyd Webber's Phantom of the Opera. The running had 12 performances, with a cast of more than 50. The production featured a 35-piece orchestra and a production staff of nearly 100 students. The performances drew over 6,000 playgoers, averaging about 500 audience members per show.

While there are no plans at this time to release Phantom to the stock and amateur market, we want to be fully prepared for when that great day arrives. What we learn from the production at Baldwin-Wallace College and five other sites we've chosen will help us with the process of bringing the longest running musical in Broadway history to theaters across the country.

—Charlie Scatamacchia, vice president for R&H Theatricals

R&H Theatricals cited BW's production as the responsible party for the planned staging of all non-professional productions of "Phantom".

=== The Beatles Festival ===
During each spring since 2011, students from Baldwin Wallace have performed an entire album recorded by The Beatles, complete with full orchestrations. This ensemble features a unique collection of performers drawing from all majors in the Conservatory. In a nod to the school's Bach Festival, The Beatles Festival rotates four of group's works: Abbey Road, Sgt. Pepper's Lonely Hearts Club Band, Magical Mystery Tour, and The White Album.

== Alumni & Faculty ==
for a List of renowned BW Conservatory alumni, see List of BW Conservatory Alumni

Several of the staff members are full-time Cleveland Orchestra members, and all faculty maintain an active performance career. In 2009, BW added Wagnerian soprano Jane Eaglen to the staff, joining the 20th-century music performer Nanette Canfield, and heldentenor Timothy Mussard. The instrumental staff features Cleveland Orchestra trumpeter Jack Sutte and author and keyboard studies clinician Robert Mayerovitch.
