= Willis N. Holcombe =

American academic (born 1945)

Chancellor of the Florida College System
- In office 2007–Present
- Preceded by: J. David Armstrong, Jr.

Personal details
- Born: April 18, 1945 (age 81)
- Education: Baldwin-Wallace College

Willis "Will" N. Holcombe is an American academic. He became Chancellor of the Florida College System in October 2007 and previously served as President of Broward College from 1987 to 2004, and returned as interim President from November 2006 to July 2007.

== Early life ==
Holcombe was born on April 18, 1945. He graduated in 1963 from Defiance High School in Defiance, Ohio. He ran track and still owns the school record in the 200 meter dash, with a time of 21.2 set in 1963.

He graduated in 1967 with a bachelor's degree from Baldwin-Wallace College, where he ran track and was a member of Sigma Phi Epsilon fraternity. He later earned a master's and doctorate in College Administration from the University of Florida.

In addition, he was a former U.S. Marine Corps Captain before he was honorably discharged.

== Career ==
Holcombe began his teaching career at Ford Junior High School in Brook Park, Ohio. He later joined Florida's State College System, serving as an English professor at Santa Fe College and Broward College, where he eventually became president in 1987.

He has served as Interim Chancellor of the Florida Department of Education’s Division of Community Colleges. In addition he was Vice-Chancellor of the Miami Chamber of Commerce. Holcombe has more than 30 years of experience in educational leadership and collegiate administration.

He has also served as Vice President of Brevard Community College, provost and academic dean for Broward Community College's Central Campus and assistant to the President for Broward Community College.

Dr. Holcombe has numerous professional affiliations. He is a member of the Florida Collegiate Consortium for International/Intercultural Education, the Steering Committee of statewide Council of Community College Presidents, Florida Association of Community Colleges, Florida Association of Colleges and Universities, Florida Distance Learning Institute, College Consortium of International Studies, and the Community College of the Air Force. Dr. Holcombe's community activities include the United Way of Broward County, the Coordinating Council of Broward, Community Blood Centers of South Florida, the Executive Committee of the Board of Governors of the Greater Fort Lauderdale Chamber of Commerce, and the Broward Alliance.

Since 2003, he has been serving on the Board of Directors of BankAtlantic, on the compensation committee.

== Awards and recognition ==
He was inducted into the Baldwin-Wallace College Athletic Hall of Fame.

Broward College would later name an ultra-high tech Higher Education Complex on its main downtown Fort Lauderdale as the "Willis Holcombe Center."

Holcombe was a torchbearer for the 1996 Summer Olympics in Atlanta. He has also received the "Miami Herald Spirit of Excellence Charles Whited Award," "Leader of the Year Award" from Leadership Broward, "Honorary Doctorate of Humane Letters" from Nova Southeastern University, the "Silver Medallion Award" from the National Conference of Community and Justice, and the "President's Award for Professional Excellence" from the Florida Association of Community Colleges.

There is a transfer student scholarship in his name at Florida International University that is awarded to students who not only thrive in the classroom but outside as well through volunteer and community involvement. It is available to graduates of Broward College covers the full cost of in-state tuition and registration fees. A minimum cumulative grade point average of 3.5 is required.

== See also ==
- Education in Florida
- List of Baldwin-Wallace College people

Academic offices
Preceded by J. David Armstrong, Jr.	Chancellor of the Florida College System; 2007–	Succeeded by N/A
