= Dennis P. Gallon =

American academic

Dr. Dennis P. Gallon

Former President of Palm Beach State College
- Incumbent
- Assumed office 1997

Personal details
- Education: University of Florida; Indiana University Bloomington; Edward Waters College

Dennis P. Gallon is an American academic. Gallon graduated with a bachelor's degree in business from Edward Waters College. He received a master's degree from Indiana University Bloomington in business. He went on to complete his Doctorate in Higher Education Administration from the University of Florida. In 1997 he was selected to be President of Palm Beach State College, then referred to as Palm Beach Community College, He has since retired. Prior to that appointment, Gallon had been President of Florida Community College at Jacksonville; Kent-Campus.

== See also ==
- Palm Beach State College
- Florida College System
