= Palm Beach State College =

Public college in Lake Worth, Florida, US

Coordinates: 26.8436°N 80.0787°W

- Former names: Palm Beach Junior College, Palm Beach Community College
- Motto: Your Pathway To Success
- Type: Public college
- Established: 1933; 93 years ago
- Parent institution: Florida College System
- President: Ava L. Parker, J.D.
- Administrative staff: 1,099
- Students: 24,223 (all undergraduate)
- Location: Lake Worth Beach, Florida, United States
- Campus: Urban
- Nickname: Panthers
- Website: www.palmbeachstate.edu

Palm Beach State College is a public college in Lake Worth, Florida, United States. It is part of the Florida College System. Palm Beach State College enrolls 40,000 students in 170 programs of study including bachelor of applied science, associate in arts and associate in science degree programs, and short-term certificates, as well as continuing education and avocational courses. In 2009, the college started its first baccalaureate program, a Bachelor of Applied Science degree in Supervision & Management.

== History ==
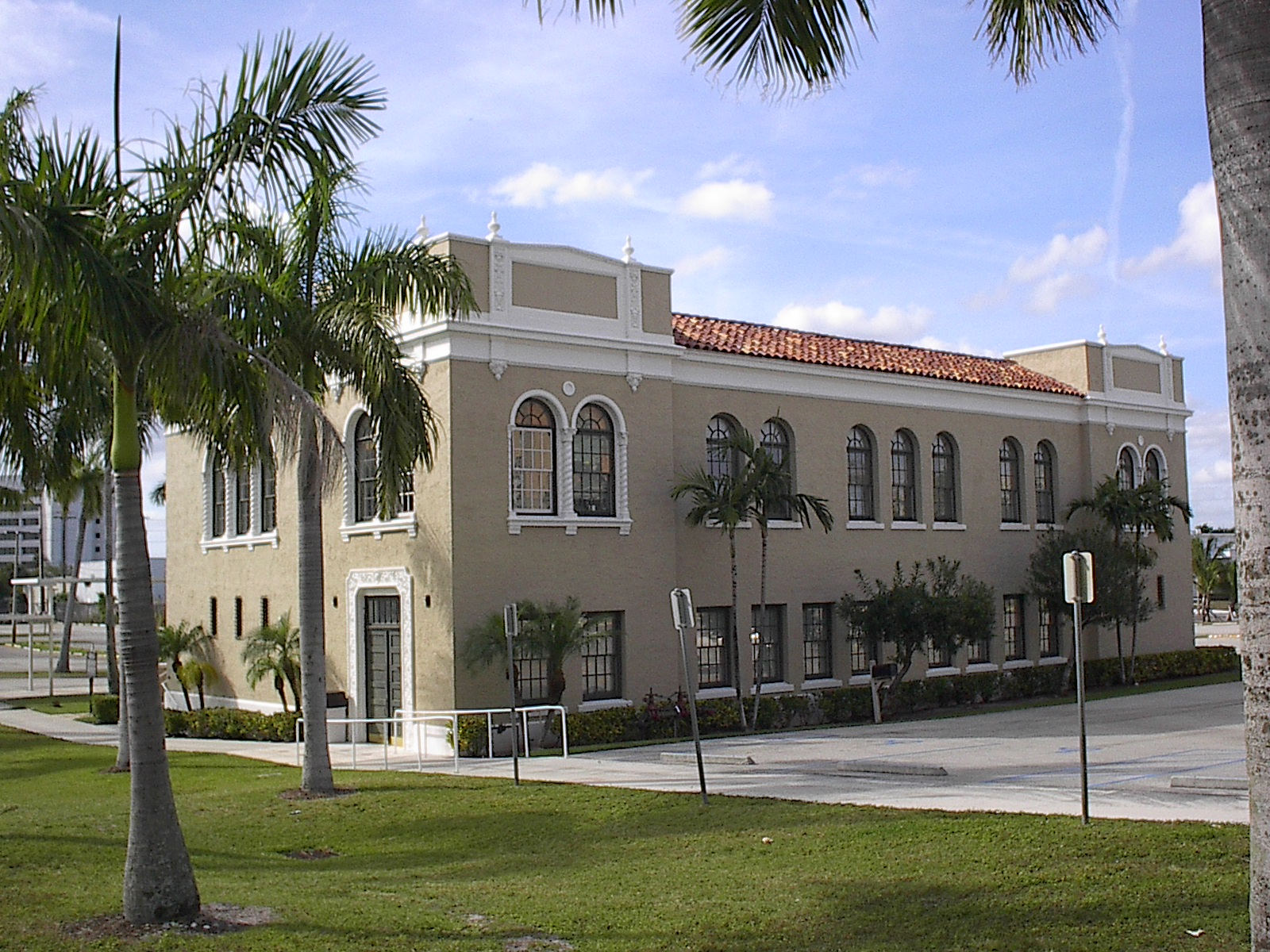
Original Palm Beach Junior College building, located on campus of Dreyfoos School of the Arts

Palm Beach State College was founded in 1933 as Palm Beach Junior College and was the first public junior college in the state of Florida. The Old Palm Beach Junior College Building is listed on the National Register of Historic Places.

The college's first classes were held at Palm Beach High School in West Palm Beach. County school superintendent Joe Youngblood and Howell Watkins, principal of Palm Beach High School, who became the college's first dean, were instrumental in opening the college. The college's initial goal was to provide additional training to local high school graduates who were unable to find jobs during the Great Depression.

In 1948, Palm Beach Junior College moved to Morrison Field, a deactivated Army Air Force base, which is now President Donald J. Trump International Airport. In 1951, the college relocated to the Lake Park Town Hall. Due to the limited availability of space at the town hall, the college had to lay off faculty and staff and cut enrollment to 200 students. During this period, Palm Beach Junior College was known as "the little orphan college." In 1955, the Palm Beach County Commission gave the college 114 acres (46 ha) in Lake Worth, and the state legislature passed a bill providing over $1,000,000 for construction at this site. The college moved to this location, which remains its main campus, in the fall of 1956.

In 1965, Palm Beach Junior College merged with Roosevelt Junior College, which was established in 1958 under President Britton Sayles to serve African American students. In 1968, control over the college passed from the Palm Beach County school district to a board of trustees. In 1978, the college opened its Belle Glade campus. The Palm Beach Gardens campus opened in 1982. In 1983, the college opened a campus adjacent to Florida Atlantic University in Boca Raton. In 1988, the college's board of trustees changed the college's name to Palm Beach Community College.

The District Board of Trustees approved a resolution in June 2009 stating that the college's name should change in light of offering baccalaureate degrees. On September 8, 2009, the Board approved changing the name to Palm Beach State College. The new name officially took effect on January 12, 2010.

== Campus ==
Palm Beach State College's main campus is located in Palm Beach County, Florida. In addition to the Lake Worth campus, the largest (114 acre/51 building complex) and longest established campus (1956), the college also serves students at full-service locations in Belle Glade (1978), Palm Beach Gardens (1982), Boca Raton (1983) and Loxahatchee Groves (2017).

== Academics ==
Palm Beach State College enrolls nearly 25,000 students in over 100 programs of study including bachelor of applied science, associate in arts and associate in science degree programs, and short-term certificates.

=== Enrollment ===
Demographics of student body (Fall 2018)
	Students	Florida	U.S. Census
African American	26.5%	16.9%	13.4%
Asian American	3.5%	2.9%	5.8%
White	35.7%	54.1%	60.7%
Hispanic American	29.2%	25.6%	18.1%
Native American	0.5%	0.5%	1.3%

The college is accredited by the Southern Association of Colleges and Schools Commission on Colleges to award the Bachelor of Science, Bachelor of Applied Science, Associate in Arts, Associate in Science and Associate in Applied Science degrees.

The Palm Beach State College truck technology program was ranked as the best in the United States in 2015.

== Athletics ==
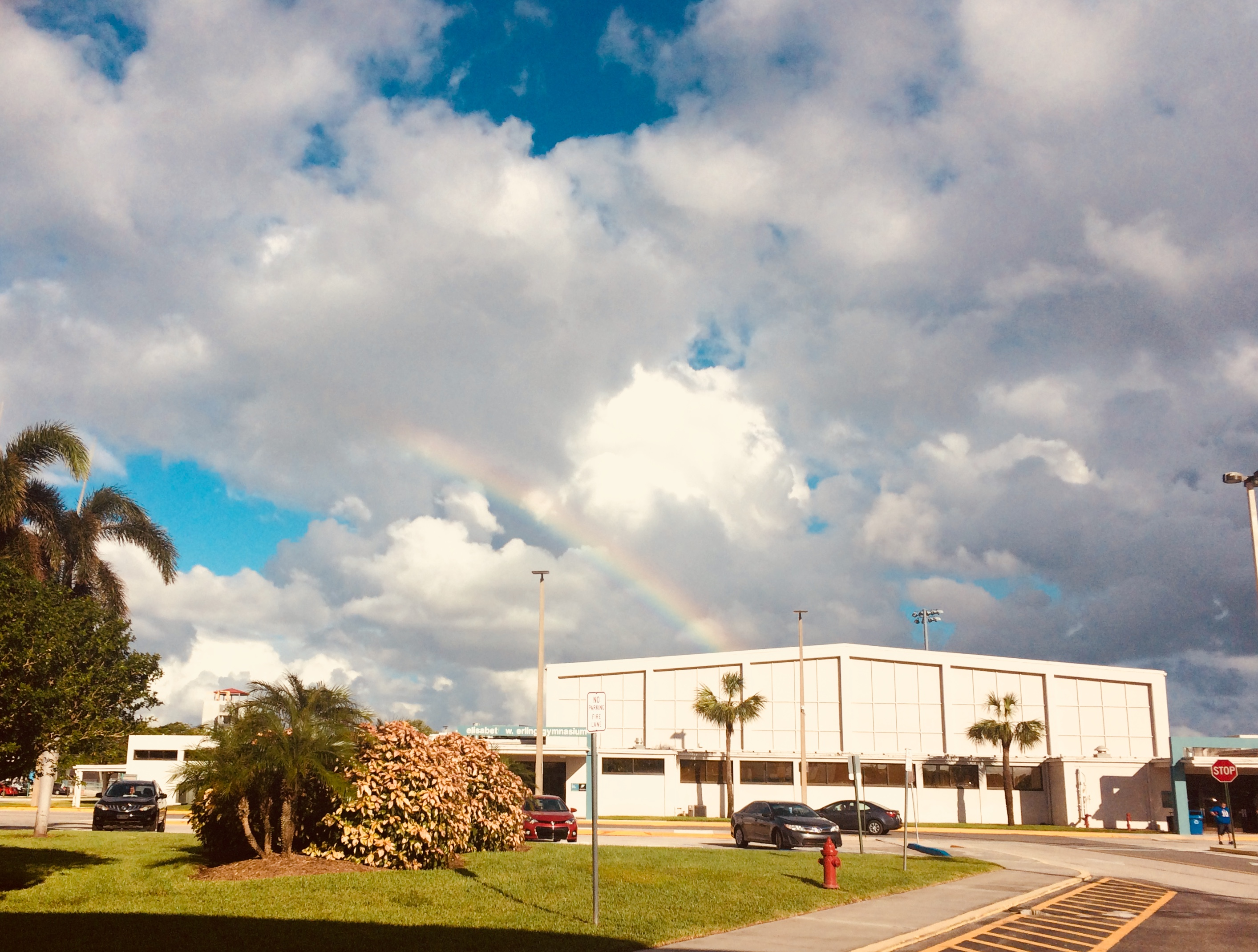
The Athletic Center

The Palm Beach Panthers compete in the Southern Conference of the Florida State College Activities Association, a body of the National Junior College Athletic Association Region 8. In 2013, the Panthers baseball team were runners-up at the Alpine Bank Junior College World Series.

== Notable people ==
=== Administrators and faculty ===
Historical administrators and faculty of the college include names foundational to the history of education in Palm Beach County and Florida, as evident on buildings throughout the campus and on public schools across the county bearing their names.

In 1933, then-county school superintendent Joe A. Youngblood and then-Palm Beach High School principal Howell L. Watkins founded Palm Beach Junior College with volunteer teachers and 45 students.

More names of that ilk include the college's first and second presidents, John I. Leonard (from 1936 to 1958) and Harold C. Manor (from 1958 to 1978) respectively, and Britton G. Sayles, president and founder of Roosevelt Junior College (from 1958 to 1965). And the school's third and fourth presidents, Edward M. Eissey (from 1979 to 1997) and Dennis P. Gallon (from 1997 to 2015).

Notable faculty names include Watson B Duncan III of whom it was written: "the man who taught myth was indeed mythological". In addition to inspiring students and seeing the new theater named for him, between 1948 and 1991, Duncan taught English and speech, and was chair of the communications department.

=== Alumni ===
Among the most notable alumni of Palm Beach State College are actor Burt Reynolds; Jesper Parnevik, who currently plays on the PGA Tour; soap opera actress Deidre Hall; Yolanda Griffith, an Olympic Gold Medalist and Professional Basketball Player with the WNBA; and James L. Wattenbarger, who was the Architect of the Florida Community College system.

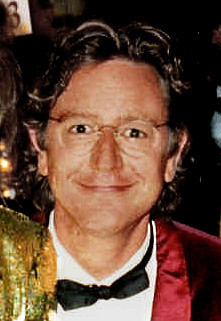
Judge Reinhold

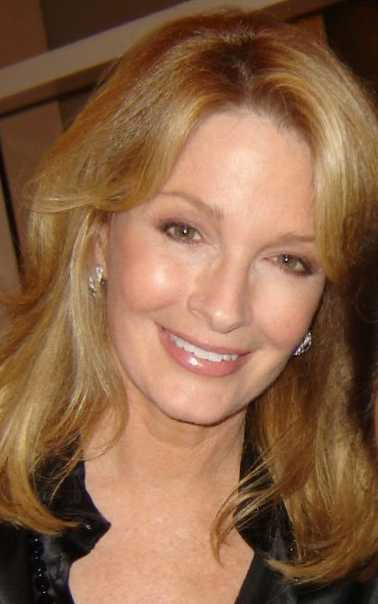
Deidre Hall

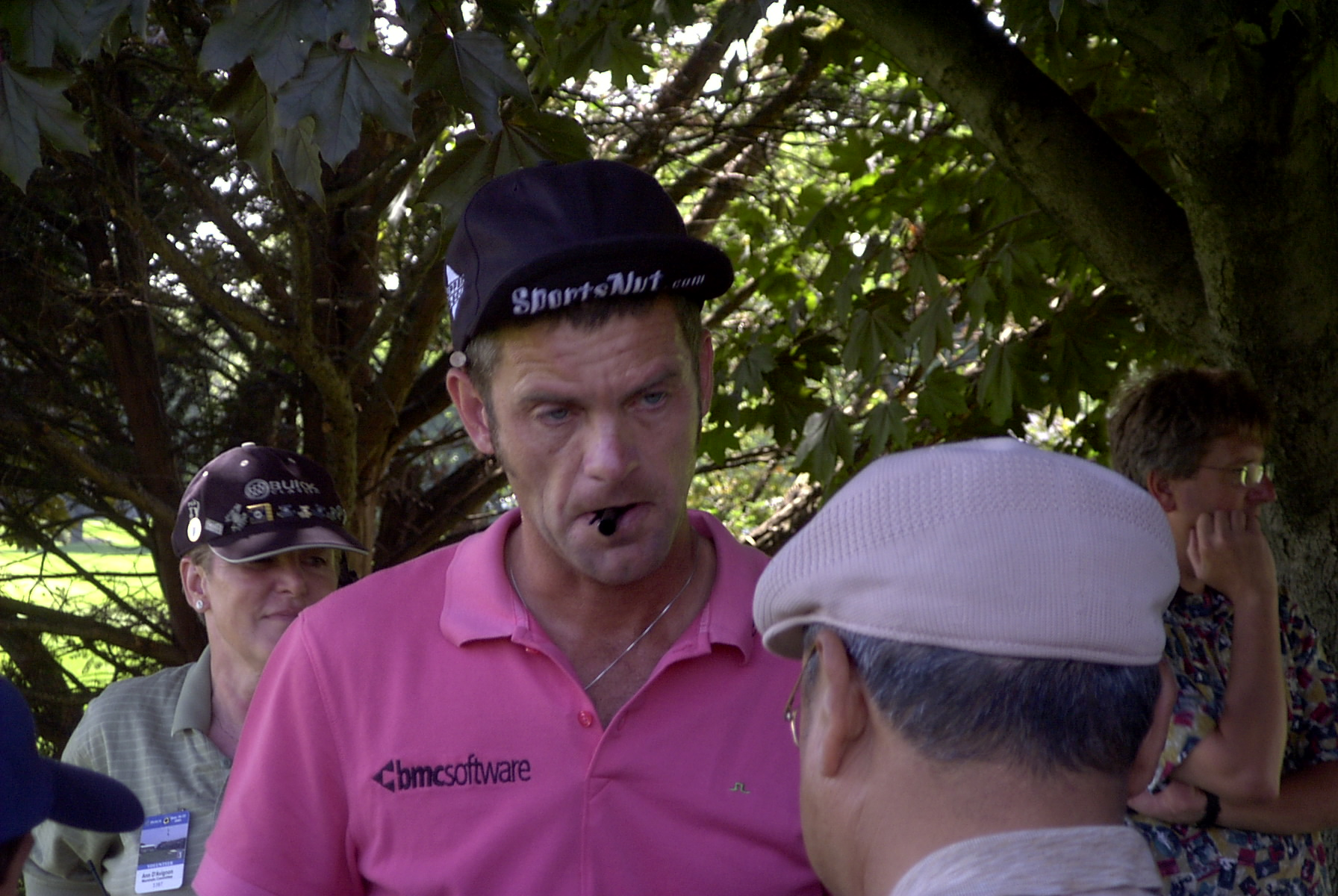
Jesper Parnevik

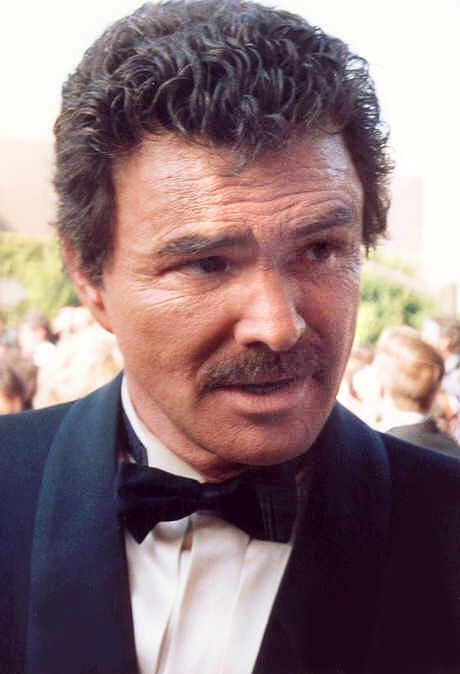
Burt Reynolds

- Ross Baumgarten, professional baseball player
- Dante Bichette, professional baseball player
- Wilson G. Bradshaw, President of Florida Gulf Coast University
- Mark Brownson, professional baseball player
- Crystl Bustos, Olympic gold medalist in softball
- William Calley, convicted war criminal (did not graduate)
- Tony Cruz, professional baseball player
- Paul Dicken, professional baseball player
- Tal Erel, Israel National Baseball Team player
- Gar Finnvold, professional baseball player
- Mark Foley, former U.S. Representative
- Joe Grahe, professional baseball player
- Ken Green, professional golfer
- Yolanda Griffith, Olympic gold medalist and professional basketball player
- Deidre Hall, television actress
- David Manning, professional baseball player
- Monte Markham, television and movie actor
- Andy McGaffigan, professional baseball player
- Bobby Muñoz, professional baseball player
- Randy O'Neal, professional baseball player
- Jesper Parnevik, professional golfer
- Brad Peacock, professional baseball player
- Judge Reinhold, television and movie actor
- Sammis Reyes, Chilean basketball and American football player
- Burt Reynolds, television and movie actor
- Dusty Rhodes (baseball coach), college and Olympic baseball coach
- Antoan Richardson, professional baseball player and coach
- Lucia St. Clair Robson, historical novelist
- Kevin Siegrist, professional player
- Kim Swan, politician and leader of the opposition party in Bermuda
- Robby Thompson, professional baseball player
- James L. Wattenbarger, architect of the Florida Community College system
- Charles Willeford, writer
- Gareth Williams, television and movie actor
- Jeff Wilpon, former Chief Operating Officer of the New York Mets

== See also ==
- List of colleges and universities in Florida
- List of community colleges
