= James L. Wattenbarger =

American educator (1922–2006)

Dr. James L. Wattenbarger
- Born: May 2, 1922
- Died: August 14, 2006 (aged 84)
- Education: University of Florida
- Known for: Known as the Father of the Florida Community Colleges System

James Lorenzo Wattenbarger (May 2, 1922 – August 14, 2006) was an American educator.

A native of Cleveland, Tennessee, Wattenbarger is credited as being the Father of the Community College System of Florida. His doctoral dissertation at the University of Florida outlined a master plan that the state used in 1955 to create the modern community college system.

Wattenbarger returned to the University of Florida in 1968 to become a professor, and he founded the Institute of Higher Education. He was an active faculty member at the University of Florida until his retirement in 1992.

Santa Fe College named the Wattenbarger Student Services Building after him in 1995.

== Education ==
- Associate degree from Palm Beach Junior College in 1941
- Bachelor's degree from the University of Florida in 1943
- Master's degree from University of Florida in 1947
- Doctorate in Education from the University of Florida in 1950
