= Gary Gallon =

Canadian activist

Gary Thomas Gallon (October 1, 1945 – July 3, 2003) was a Canadian environmental activist and policy advisor.

President of the Canadian Institute for Business and the Environment, and editor of The Gallon Environment Letter, Gallon dedicated 30 years to raising environmental awareness among Canadians and inspiring environmentalists worldwide. Originally from California, Gallon came to Canada during the Vietnam War. Gallon's early forays in environmental activism included helping to found the Society Promoting Environmental Conservation (SPEC, now one of the oldest environmental organizations in British Columbia) and co-founding Greenpeace. His later moves away from heady activism into the political arena made him an authority on "Green" economics. In the early 1990s he became president of a Montreal-based think tank called the Canadian Institute for Business and the Environment (CIBE) "filling" what he called the "knowledge gap" of protecting the environment based on the logic of economics.

On July 3, 2003, Gary Gallon died after a long battle with cancer. He was 58.
