= Junior Achievement of South Florida =

Junior Achievement (JA) was founded in 1919 by Theodore Vail, president of American Telephone & Telegraph; Horace Moses, president of Strathmore Paper Co. and Senator Murray Crane of Massachusetts. Its first program, The Company Program, was offered to high school students on an after-school basis. In 1975, the organization entered the classroom with the introduction of Project Business for the middle grades. Since then, Junior Achievement has gradually expanded its activities and broadened its scope to encompass an ever-widening student population.

Junior Achievement of South Florida was founded locally in 1959 by the Fort Lauderdale Rotary Club and served just 373 high school students during its first year. Programs now span grades K-12, with age appropriate curricula designed to teach elementary students about their roles as individuals, workers, and consumers and to prepare middle grade and high school students for key economic and workforce issues they will face. Junior Achievement programs reached over 80,000 Broward and South Palm Beach County students during the 2025-2026 school year.

== Programs ==
Junior Achievement of South Florida offers age-appropriate curricula to ensure that students understand their roles as future members of the business community. The programs are divided into three categories: elementary, middle school and high school.

=== Elementary ===
The elementary school programs include six sequential themes for kindergarten through fifth-grade students and one capstone experience. Students learn the basic concepts of business and economics and how education is relevant to the workplace. The activities build on studies from each preceding grade and prepare students for secondary school and continued learning. Fifth graders can have the opportunity to work at JA BizTown, a facility on the Broward College campus.

=== Middle school ===
The middle school programs emphasize the value of workforce readiness, entrepreneurship, and financial literacy. Students are also introduced to many economic concepts and facts about the working world.

The programs at this level expand upon the concepts that were learned in elementary school and help teens make good decisions about their futures. Junior Achievement's lessons are meant to supplement standard social studies curricula and develop communication skills. 8th graders have the opportunity to work beyond JA BizTown to JA Career Discovery Park, also on the Broward College campus.

=== High school ===
The high school programs teach students about concepts relating to entrepreneurship, financial literacy, and work readiness. Students are encouraged to make informed decisions about their future, and foster skills that might be useful in the business world. Volunteers aid in these goals by bringing real-life business experience into the classroom, to reinforce the lessons that are taught.

== JA World Huizenga Center at Broward College ==
Since its inception, Junior Achievement has been committed to "experiential learning." Taking it to the next level, Junior Achievement of South Florida created the JA World Huizenga center at Broward College that houses two new programs: JA BizTown and JA Career Discovery Park. This dramatic shift forward will significantly transform how every local student is taught to view the world of work, free enterprise and their possibilities for success in it. Through the experiential learning derived from both BizTown and Career Discovery Park, students achieve advanced levels of engagement, reflection, and personal responsibility.

=== JA BizTown ===
JA BizTown is a simulated miniature city where fifth-grade students take on roles as business owners, civic leaders, and consumers. The program introduces students to the principles of the free enterprise system through practical activities involving customer service, business loan repayment, and financial management. Participants operate simulated businesses and work toward achieving profitability by the end of the activity.

=== JA Career Discovery Park ===
JA Career Discovery Park is an immersive simulation program that allows students to explore over 150 career pathways in industries like automotive, beauty, construction, healthcare and maritime. They also learn about Florida career opportunities. The program includes financial literacy from the original JA Finance Park, giving students an identity to manage that includes marital status, number of children, annual income, education attained, and job type. Students take these characteristics into consideration as they prepare budgets that take into consideration housing, food, furniture, insurance, education, automobiles, investments, and more. The new program brings together interests, income, abilities, aptitudes and values under one exploration umbrella.

=== JA Pre-Apprenticeship Programs ===
The JA Pre-Apprenticeship Program prepares 18-24 year old seniors high school students and young adults for trade industry jobs. They train participants for 6 months in their career track of choice: Marine Service Technician, Construction, Water Management, and Telecommunications. The program includes hands on training and industry certifications as a pathway into paid jobs.
