= Rebecca Pitcher =

American actress

- Born: March 21, 1972
- Education: Baldwin Wallace College Peabody Institute
- Occupation(s): Singer, actress

Rebecca Pitcher is an American musical theatre actress. She is primarily known for her role as Christine Daaé in the Broadway adaptation of The Phantom of the Opera.

== Biography ==
Pitcher graduated from Baldwin Wallace College in Ohio and later attending the Peabody Institute. She was part of the Pittsburgh Opera Center at Duquesne, playing roles such as Papagena in The Magic Flute.

From 1999 to 2004, Pitcher played the role of Christine Daaé in the Phantom of the Opera on the third national tour. A year later, she joined the Broadway cast as an alternate for Christine, and on April 17, 2006, she became the main performer of the role, replacing Sandra Joseph.

In February 2018 she joined the cast of Carousel on Broadway.

== Performance credits ==
Year(s)	Production	Role	Location	Category
1999-2004	The Phantom of the Opera	Christine Daaé		US Tour
2005-2006	The Phantom of the Opera	Christine Daaé	Majestic Theatre	Broadway
2008	The Phantom of the Opera	Christine Daaé	Raleigh Memorial Auditorium	Regional
2009	Camelot	Nimue, Ensemble	Goodspeed Opera House	Regional
2011	Jane Austen's Pride and Prejudice, A Musical	Cassandra Austen, Mrs. Reynolds	Peter Norton Space	Festival
2011-2012	Annie	Grace Farrell	Northern Stage Company	Regional
2013	She Loves Me	Amalia Balash	Beck Center for the Performing Arts	Regional
2014	Til Divorce Do Us Part	Kate understudy, Audrey understudy, Suzy understudy	DR2 Theatre	Off-Broadway
2015-2017	The Sound of Music	Baroness Elberfeld replacement, Elsa Schraeder understudy/replacement		US Tour
2018	Carousel	Ensemble, Mrs. Mullin understudy	Imperial Theatre	Broadway
