= Galon =

Galon, Gal-on, etc. may refer to:

- Gal On, a kibbutz in Israel's southern lowlands
- Zehava Gal-On, an Israeli politician
- Galon, a Burmese term for Garuda, a legendary bird or bird-like creature in Hindu, Buddhist and Jain faith
- Galon or Gallon, bishop of Beauvais (c. 1099-1104) and Paris (1104-1116)

== See also ==
- Gallon, a measure of volume of approximately four litres
- Galloon, a metallic braid used for trimming clothing and uniforms
