= Florida State University Panama City =

Public college in Panama City, Florida, US

- Established: 1982
- Parent institution: Florida State University
- Accreditation: SACSCOC
- Students: 4,000
- Location: 4750 Collegiate Drive, Panama City, Florida, 32405, United States
- Campus: 28 acres (11 ha)
- Website: pc.fsu.edu

Florida State University–Panama City (commonly referred to as FSU Panama City, Florida State PC or FSUPC) is located 100 miles (160 km) from the Florida State University Tallahassee campus in Panama City, Florida. Established in 1982, the campus serves more than 4,000 students supported by 20 bachelor's and nine graduate degree programs on campus and online.

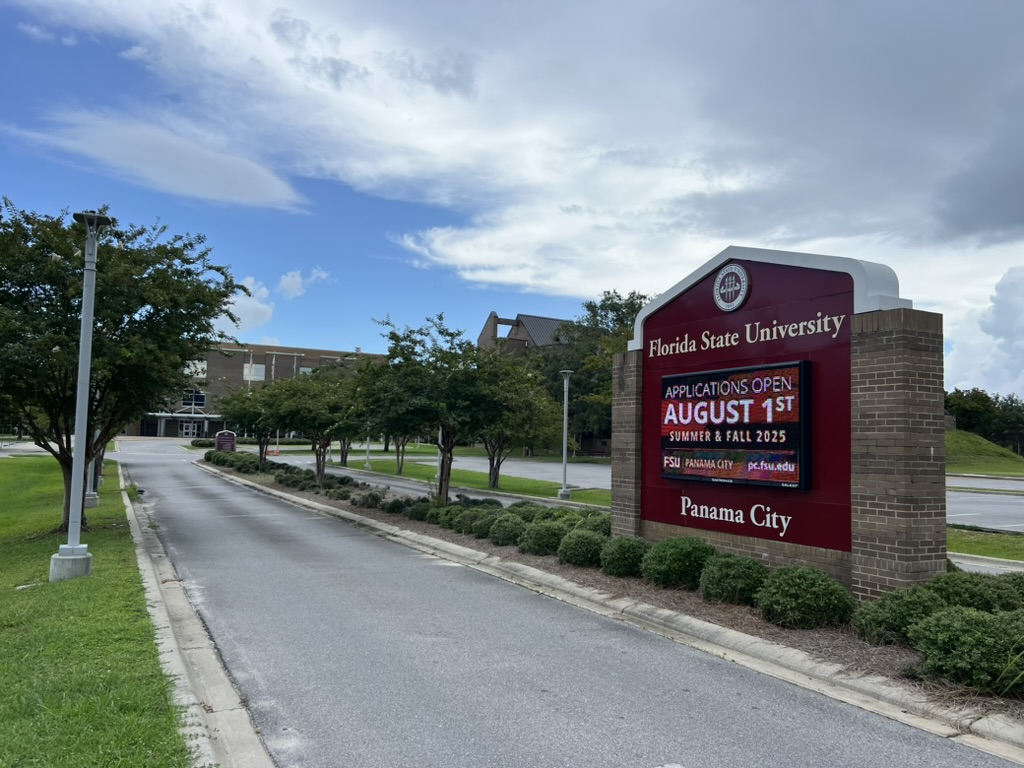
Main entrance of FSU Panama City

Recognizing the need for four-year degree programs in the Bay County area in the early 1970s, members of the local business community, the Naval Coastal Systems Center, Gulf Coast State College, formerly Gulf Coast Community College, the Bay County School Board and Tyndall Air Force Base began lobbying for an institution of higher learning. Shortly after the community began lobbying, the Florida Board of Regents (BOR) instituted a plan to make higher education available to Florida citizens living in major population areas located beyond a reasonable commuting distance (50 miles) of a state-supported university.

In 1972, the BOR directed the University of West Florida to establish a center in Panama City. Classes began that summer with an enrollment of 65 elementary education students and a staff of two. Facilities for the center were located in the Bay County School Board Office Building and Gulf Coast Community College. In 1976, the Bay County Commission purchased 17.5 acres (71,000 m^{2}) located between Gulf Coast Community College and the beautiful waters of North Bay. The commission deeded the land to the State for use by the center. In 1981 the commission donated an additional 2.54 acres (1.03 ha) and three quadriplex buildings.

In the fall of 1982, the State Legislature and the BOR transferred administrative responsibility for the Panama City Center to the Florida State University. The new FSU at Panama City began operating with six administrative and support staff, five resident faculty, 531 students, and eleven degree programs. Classes continued to be held in the Bay County School Board Office Building and Gulf Coast Community College. Administrative offices were moved to the quadriplex buildings. When FSU accepted responsibility for the Panama City campus, it was apparent that five resident faculty could not provide all the instructional support necessary to meet the demands of a new campus. The university realized that if educational quality and program consistency were to be maintained, it would be essential for the majority of the courses on the Panama City campus to be taught by regular FSU faculty. So, a plan was developed to transport Tallahassee faculty the 100 miles (160 km) to Panama City. Two vans were placed on daily round trips from Tallahassee to Panama City.

On June 23, 1983, ground breaking occurred for the $9.1 million Phase I development of FSU at Panama City. The new facilities were formally dedicated on March 22, 1986. The administrative building was named in honor of Senator Dempsey Barron, who sponsored the bill that secured funds for the permanent location of an FSU facility in Panama City. The new campus facilities opened for students in January 1987. In March 1987, an additional 5.62 acres (22,700 m^{2}) along the bay were deeded to the State for use by the campus. This donation brought the campus to its current size of 28 acres (110,000 m^{2}). A new conference center facility was completed in January 2000, and the master plan for the development of the campus over the next decade included the construction of facilities, student life and academic buildings.

On June 8, 2012, The Florida State University's board of trustees approved a four-year academic plan for FSU Panama City which allowed the campus to offer a limited range of general-education and lower-level courses that are focused on upper-level majors offered at FSU Panama City. This historic decision allowed for the admission of the first freshman class in fall 2013.

FSU Panama City is the only university in the country to offer undergraduate and graduate certificates in Underwater Crime Scene Investigation. Starting in 2016, FSU Panama City began an expansion of programs including undergraduate degrees in mechanical engineering, hospitality management, commercial entrepreneurship public health, and financial planning and graduate degrees in law enforcement intelligence, organizational management and communication, and systems engineering. In addition, the degree in nurse anesthesia was converted to a Doctorate in Nurse Anesthesia. As part of this growth in programs, FSU Panama City added student housing serving both FSU and Gulf Coast State College students.
