= Florida College System =

State colleges in the U.S. state of Florida

- Former name: Florida Community College System
- Type: Public college system
- Established: 1933
- Chancellor: Kathy Hebda
- Students: 640,183
- Location: 28 colleges, Florida, U.S.
- Sporting affiliations: Florida State College Activities Association, NJCAA Region VIII
- Website: www.fldoe.org/schools/higher-ed/fl-college-system

The Florida College System, previously the Florida Community College System, is a system of 28 public community colleges and state colleges in the U.S. state of Florida. In 2020–2021, enrollment consisted of 640,183 students. In the 2015–16 academic year, the system had 70 campuses, had 46,329 employees, had 801,023 students, and awarded 115,908 degrees and certificates. Together with the State University System of Florida, which consists of Florida's twelve public universities, the two systems control all public higher education in the state of Florida.

While governed by local boards of trustees, the colleges are coordinated under the jurisdiction of Florida's State Board of Education. Administratively, the chancellor of the Florida College System is the chief executive officer of the system, reporting to the commissioner of Education who serves as the chief executive officer of Florida's public education system. In 2009, the Florida Legislature changed the name from the "Florida Community College System" to the "Florida College System," reflecting the fact that some of its member institutions now offer four-year bachelor's degrees. Hillsborough Community College was the last remaining member institution to use "community" in its official name before rebranding, dropping "Community" from its name to become Hillsborough College on July 1, 2025.

== Mission and offerings ==
Section (s.) 1004.65, Florida Statutes (F.S.), establishes the primary mission and responsibility of Florida College System institutions as responding to community needs for post secondary academic education and career degree education. This mission and responsibility includes:

(a) Providing lower level undergraduate instruction and awarding associate degrees.
(b) Preparing students directly for careers requiring less than baccalaureate degrees. This may include preparing for job entry, supplementing of skills and knowledge, and responding to needs in new areas of technology. Career education in a Florida College System institution shall consist of career certificates, credit courses leading to associate in science degrees and associate in applied science degrees, and other programs in fields requiring substantial academic work, background, or qualifications. A Florida College System institution may offer career education programs in fields having lesser academic or technical requirements.
(c) Providing student development services, including assessment, student tracking, support for disabled students, advisement, counseling, financial aid, career development, and remedial and tutorial services, to ensure student success.
(d) Promoting economic development for the state within each Florida College System institution district through the provision of special programs, including, but not limited to:

1. Enterprise Florida-related programs.
2. Technology transfer centers.
3. Economic development centers.
4. Workforce literacy programs.

(e) Providing dual enrollment instruction.
(f) Providing upper level instruction and awarding baccalaureate degrees as specifically authorized by law.

A separate and secondary role for Florida College System institutions includes the offering of programs in:

(a) Community services that are not directly related to academic or occupational advancement.
(b) Adult education services, including adult basic education, adult general education, adult secondary education, and General Educational Development test instruction.
(c) Recreational and leisure services.

In addition, s. 1007.33(2), F.S., requires that any Florida College System institution that offers one or more baccalaureate degree programs:

(a) Maintain as its primary mission:

1. Responsibility for responding to community needs for post secondary academic education and career degree education as prescribed in s. 1004.65(5), F.S.
2. The provision of associate degrees that provide access to a university.

(b) Maintain an open-door admission policy for associate-level degree programs and workforce education programs.
(c) Continue to provide outreach to underserved populations.
(d) Continue to provide remedial education.
(e) Comply with all provisions of the statewide articulation agreement which relate to 2-year and 4-year public degree-granting institutions as adopted by the State Board of Education pursuant to s. 1007.23, F.S.

In 2023, the presidents of the system's member institutions issued a joint statement against Diversity, equity, and inclusion initiatives and stated that they "will not fund or support any institutional practice, policy, or academic requirement that compels belief in critical race theory or related concepts such as intersectionality".

== Member institutions ==
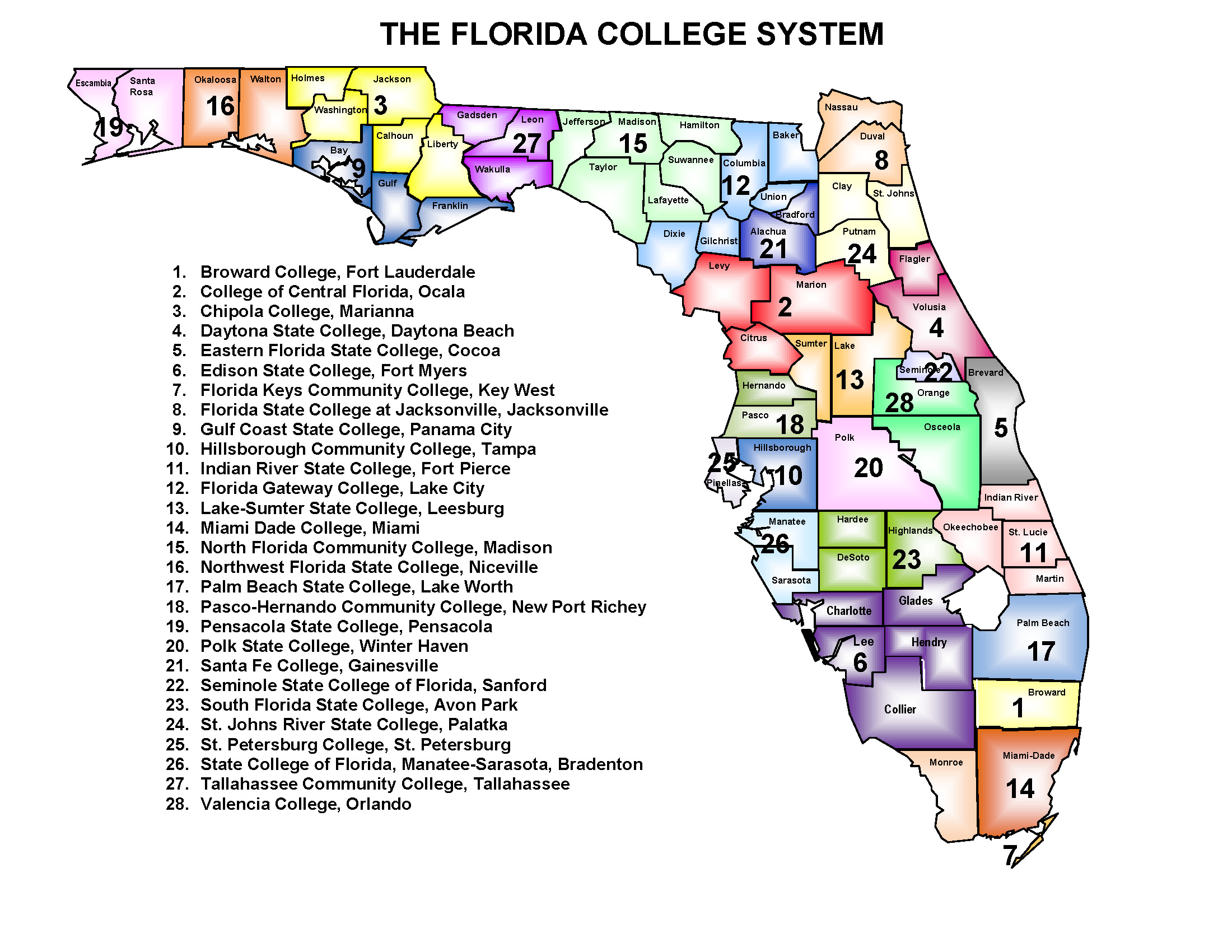
Map of the System

- Broward College
- Chipola College
- College of Central Florida
- Daytona State College
- Eastern Florida State College
- Florida Gateway College
- College of the Florida Keys
- Florida SouthWestern State College
- Florida State College at Jacksonville
- Gulf Coast State College
- Hillsborough College
- Indian River State College
- Lake–Sumter State College
- Miami Dade College
- North Florida College
- Northwest Florida State College
- Palm Beach State College
- Pasco–Hernando State College
- Pensacola State College
- Polk State College
- Santa Fe College
- Seminole State College of Florida
- South Florida State College
- St. Johns River State College
- St. Petersburg College
- State College of Florida, Manatee-Sarasota
- Tallahassee State College
- Valencia College

== Student profile ==
Racial and/or ethnic background (2014)
	Students	Florida	United States
Non-Hispanic White	45%	57%	63%
Hispanic (of any race)	26%	23%	17%
Black	18%	17%	13%
Multi-ethnic	2%	N/A	N/A
International student	2%	N/A	N/A
Other races	8%	N/A	N/A

== Athletics ==
The schools athletic teams are governed by the Florida State College Activities Association (FSCAA) and compete in the National Junior College Athletic Association Region 8.

== Chancellors and directors ==
Year	Names	Title
1957–1967	James L. Wattenbarger	Director of the Division of Community Colleges
1967–1983	Lee G. Henderson	Director of the Division of Community Colleges
1984–1997	Clark Maxwell Jr.	Executive director of the Florida Community College System
1998–2007	J. David Armstrong, Jr.	Executive director of the Florida Community College System (1998–2001), chancellor of the Florida College System (2001–2007)
2007–2011	Willis N. Holcombe	Chancellor of the Florida College System
2011–2014	Randall W. Hanna	Chancellor of the Florida College System
2015–2018	Madeline M. Pumariega	President & CEO of Take Stock in Children (2013–2015), chancellor of the Florida College System (2015–2018)
2019–present	Kathy Hebda	Chancellor of the Florida College System

== Timeline ==
James L. Wattenbarger, distinguished service professor emeritus, University of Florida and Harry T. Albertson, former chief executive officer, Florida Association of Community Colleges, outlined the history of the Florida College System through 2009.

Timeline of the Florida College System
1927	St. Petersburg Junior College founded as private, two-year college
1933	Palm Beach Junior College founded as first public college
1939	Legislature passes law allowing counties to petition for the establishment of public colleges
1947	"Junior colleges" detailed in report to legislature
1947–1948	St. Petersburg Junior College becomes part of Florida's public system Legislature approves creation of three new colleges: Palm Beach Junior College, Chipola Junior College, and Pensacola Junior College
1948	Creation of Florida Association of Public Junior Colleges
1955	Legislature created Community College Council to formulate long-range plans
1957–58	Community College Council issues report to legislature which recommended state plan for 28 community/junior colleges Legislature approves creation of six new colleges: Gulf Coast Community College, Central Florida Community College, Daytona Beach Community College, Manatee Junior College, North Florida Junior College, and St. Johns River Community College. Legislature approves statutory revisions permitting junior colleges to separate from K–12; Legislature establishes the Division of Community Colleges
1960	Legislature approves creation of four new colleges: Brevard Community College, Broward Community College, Miami Dade Community College, and Indian River Community College
1962	Legislature approves creation of three new colleges: Edison Community College, Lake City Community College, and Lake-Sumter Junior College
1964	Legislature approves creation of Okaloosa-Walton Community College
1965	Legislature approves creation of Polk Community College
1966	Legislature approves creation of five new colleges: Florida Keys Community College, Florida Community College at Jacksonville, Santa Fe Community College, Seminole Community College, and South Florida Community College
1967	Legislature approves creation of two new colleges: Valencia Community College and Tallahassee Community College
1968	Legislature approves creation of Hillsborough Community College Legislature approves measure allowing community colleges to be governed under local boards
1972	Legislature approves creation of Pasco-Hernando Community College
1979	Legislature creates Community College Coordinating Board
1983	Legislature replaces Community College Coordinating Board with State Board of Community Colleges
1996	Colleges become first state agency in Florida to embrace performance based budgeting
1998	Commissioner of Education eliminated from cabinet position
2000	Florida higher Education Reorganization Act restructures higher education systems and Division of Community Colleges merged with Division of Workforce Development
2001	Senate Bill 1162 eliminates State Board of Community Colleges, creates State Board of Education, and creates local boards of trustees
2002	New statutes give more control to local boards
2004	Legislation outlines process for community colleges to create baccalaureate degrees and allows community colleges to change names to reflect expanding mission
2009	The Florida Community College System is renamed the Florida College System
2011	FCS member institution Valencia College named nation's best community college as first-ever winner of Aspen Prize for Community College Excellence
2012	Governor Rick Scott announces "$10,000 degree challenge will help us continue to improve the value of our higher education system." As of 2015, 23 of the 28 Florida College System institutions are offering $10,000 bachelor's degrees.
2015	Santa Fe College is the second Florida college to win the Aspen Prize for Community College Excellence
2019	Indian River State College and Miami Dade College win the Aspen Prize for Community College Excellence

== See also ==
- Education in Florida
- Florida Board of Governors
- Florida Department of Education
- State University System of Florida
- List of colleges and universities in Florida
