= List of college and university student newspapers in the United States =

This is a list of student newspapers at colleges and universities in the United States.

== Alabama ==
- Alabama State University – The Hornet Tribune
- Auburn University – The Auburn Plainsman
- Auburn University at Montgomery – The Aumnibus
- Calhoun Community College – Warhawk News
- Jacksonville State University – The Chanticleer
- Miles College – The Milean
- Samford University – The Samford Crimson
- Spring Hill College – The SpringHillian
- Troy University – Tropolitan
- University of Alabama at Birmingham – The Kaleidoscope
- University of Alabama in Huntsville – The Charger Times
- University of Alabama, Tuscaloosa – The Crimson White
- University of Montevallo – The Alabamian
- University of North Alabama – Florala
- University of South Alabama – Vanguard
- University of West Alabama – muse

== Alaska ==
- University of Alaska Anchorage – The Northern Light
- University of Alaska Fairbanks – The Sun Star
- University of Alaska Southeast – The Whalesong

== Arizona ==
- Arizona State University – State Press
- Arizona State University at the West campus – @west news
- Embry–Riddle Aeronautical University – Horizons
- Mesa Community College – Mesa Legend
- Northern Arizona University – The Lumberjack
- Pima Community College – The Aztec Press
- Prescott College – The Raven Review
- University of Arizona – Arizona Daily Wildcat

== Arkansas ==
- Arkansas State University – The Herald
- Arkansas Tech University – Arka Tech
- Central Baptist College – The Tower
- Harding University – The Bison
- Henderson State University – The Oracle
- Hendrix College – The Profile
- John Brown University – The Threefold Advocate
- Lyon College – The Highlander
- Northwest Arkansas Community College – Eagle View
- Ouachita Baptist University – OBU Signal
- Southern Arkansas University – The Bray
- University of Arkansas – The Arkansas Traveler
- University of Arkansas–Fort Smith – Lions Chronicle
- University of Arkansas Little Rock – The Forum
- University of Arkansas at Pine Bluff – Arkansawyer
- University of Central Arkansas – The Echo

== California ==
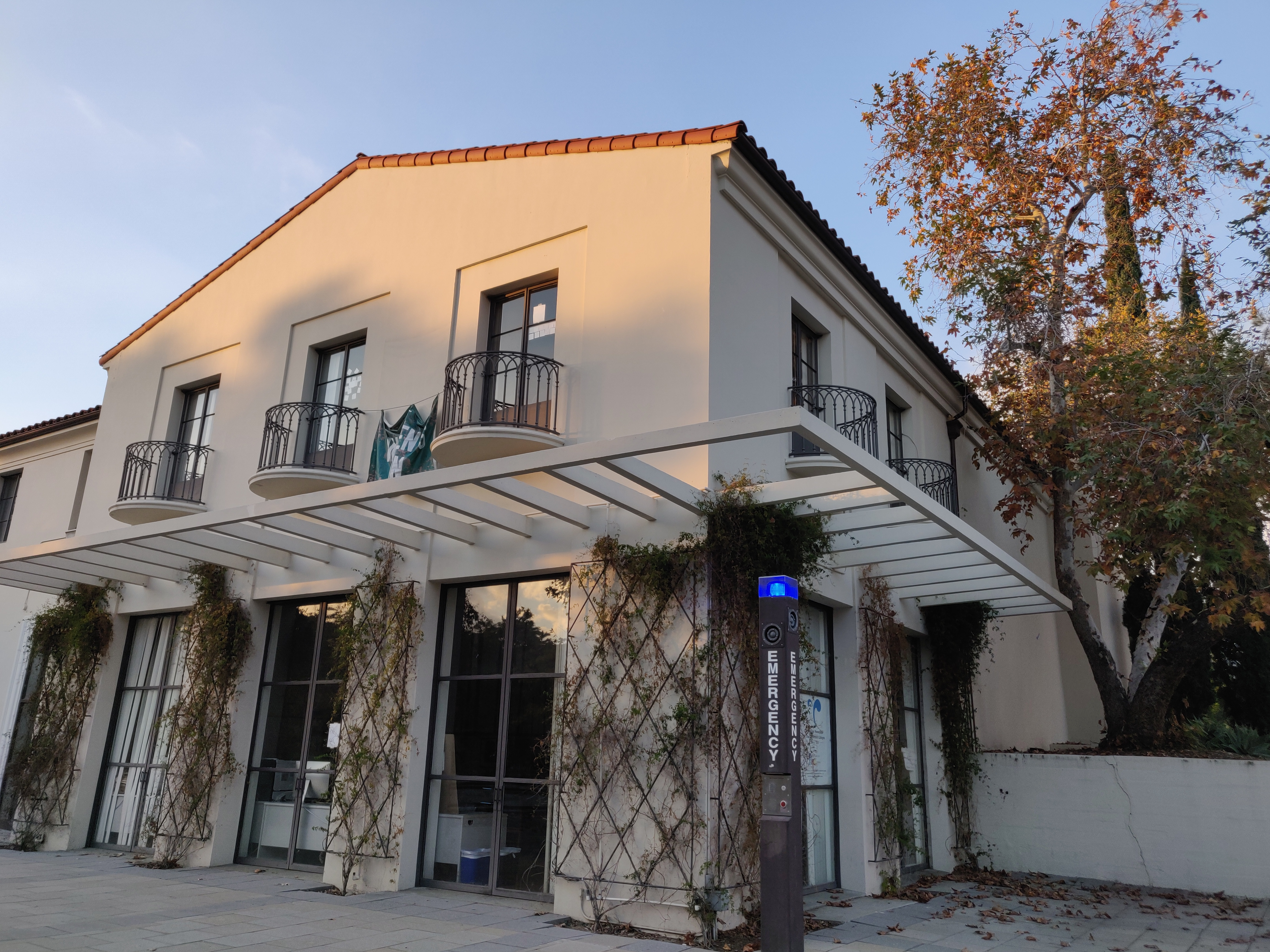
Office of The Student Life, the Claremont Colleges' newspaper

- Azusa Pacific University – The Clause
- Bakersfield College – The Renegade Rip
- Biola University – The Chimes
- Cabrillo College – The Voice
- California Baptist University – The Banner
- California Institute of Technology – The California Tech
- California Lutheran University – The Echo
- California Polytechnic State University, San Luis Obispo – Mustang News
- California State Polytechnic University, Humboldt – The Lumberjack
- California State Polytechnic University, Pomona – The Poly Post, The Pomona Point
- California State University, Chico – The Orion
- California State University, Dominguez Hills – The Bulletin
- California State University, East Bay – The Pioneer
- California State University, Fresno – The Daily Collegian
- California State University, Fullerton – The Daily Titan
- California State University, Long Beach – 22 West Magazine, Daily Forty-Niner and DIG magazine
- California State University, Los Angeles – University Times
- California State University, Monterey Bay – The Lutrinae
- California State University, Northridge – The Daily Sundial
- California State University, Sacramento – The State Hornet
- California State University, San Bernardino – Coyote Chronicle
- California State University, San Marcos – Cougar Chronicle
- California State University, Stanislaus – The Signal!
- Cerritos College – Talon Marks
- Chapman University – The Panther
- City College of San Francisco – Guardsman
- Claremont Colleges – The Student Life, Claremont Undercurrents, The Feedbacker
- Claremont McKenna College – The Forum
- College of the Desert – The Chaparral
- College of Marin – Echo Times
- Concordia University Irvine – Hilltop Herald
- Contra Costa College – The Advocate
- Cuesta College – The Cuestonian
- The Culinary Institute of America (Greystone campus) – Sage Thymes
- De Anza College – La Voz
- Diablo Valley College – The Inquirer
- Foothill College – The Sentinel
- Glendale Community College – El Vaquero
- Harvey Mudd College – The Muddraker
- John Paul the Great Catholic University – The Pelican Scoop
- Laney College – The Citizen
- Life Chiropractic College West – Lifelines
- Long Beach City College – The Viking Online
- Los Angeles Valley College – The Valley Star
- Los Medanos College – Experience
- Loyola Marymount University – The Los Angeles Loyolan
- Menlo College – Menlo Oak Press
- Occidental College – The Occidental
- Ohlone College — The Ohlone Monitor
- Pasadena City College – Courier
- Pepperdine University – Graphic
- Pitzer College – The Outback News
- Point Loma Nazarene University – The Point Weekly
- Saint Mary's College of California – The Collegian
- San Diego State University – The Daily Aztec
- San Francisco State University – The Golden Gate [X]press
- San José State University – The Spartan Daily
- Santa Ana College – el Don
- Santa Clara University – The Santa Clara
- Santa Monica College – The Corsair
- Scripps College – The Scripps Voice
- Sonoma State University – The Sonoma State STAR
- Stanford University – The Stanford Daily, The Stanford Review
- The Public Forum
- University of California, Berkeley – The Daily Californian, The Free Peach
- University of California, Davis – The California Aggie
- University of California, Irvine – New University
- University of California, Los Angeles – Daily Bruin
- University of California, Merced – The Prodigy
- University of California, Riverside – The Highlander
- University of California, San Diego – The UCSD Guardian
- University of California, Santa Barbara – Daily Nexus, The Bottom Line
- University of California, Santa Cruz – City on a Hill Press
- University of La Verne – Campus Times
- University of Redlands – Redlands Bulldog
- University of San Diego – The USD Vista, California Review
- University of San Diego School of Law – Motions
- University of San Francisco – San Francisco Foghorn
- University of Southern California – Daily Trojan
- University of the Pacific – The Pacifican
- Westmont College – The Horizon
- Whittier College – The Quaker Campus

== Colorado ==
- Adams State University – The South Coloradan
- Arapahoe Community College – The Arapahoe Pinnacle
- Fort Lewis College – The Independent
- Front Range Community College – The Front Page
- Colorado College – The Catalyst
- Colorado Mesa University – Criterion
- Colorado School of Mines – The Oredigger
- Colorado State University – Rocky Mountain Collegian
- Colorado State University Pueblo – Today
- Metropolitan State University of Denver – The Metropolitan
- Pikes Peak State College – The Paper
- University of Colorado Boulder – CU Independent
- University of Colorado Colorado Springs – The Scribe
- University of Colorado Denver – The Advocate
- University of Denver – Clarion
- University of Northern Colorado – The Mirror
- Western Colorado University – Top o’ the World

== Connecticut ==
- Central Connecticut State University – The Recorder
- Connecticut College – The College Voice
- Connecticut State Community College Capital – Capital Student News
- Connecticut State Community College Housatonic – Horizons
- Connecticut State Community College Manchester – Live Wire
- Connecticut State Community College Middlesex – The Flying Horse
- Connecticut State Community College Naugatuck Valley – The Tamarack
- Connecticut State Community College Norwalk – The Voice
- Connecticut State Community College Quinebaug Valley – Quinebaug Inquirer
- Connecticut State Community College Tunxis – Tunxis Sun
- Eastern Connecticut State University – The Campus Lantern
- Fairfield University – The Fairfield Mirror
- Quinnipiac University – The Quinnipiac Chronicle
- Sacred Heart University – The Spectrum
- Southern Connecticut State University – Southern News
- Trinity College – The Trinity Tripod
- University of Connecticut – The Daily Campus
- University of Hartford – The Informer
- University of New Haven – The Charger Bulletin
- Wesleyan University – The Wesleyan Argus
- Western Connecticut State University – The Echo
- Yale University – The Yale Daily News (daily), The Yale Herald (weekly)

== Delaware ==
- Delaware State University – The Hornet
- Delaware Technical Community College Jack F. Owens Campus – The Script
- University of Delaware – The Review

== District of Columbia ==
- American University – The Eagle
- Catholic University of America – The Tower
- Gallaudet University – The Buff and Blue
- George Washington University – The GW Hatchet
- Georgetown University – The Georgetown Voice, The Hoya, Georgetown Law Weekly
- Howard University – The Hilltop
- Trinity Washington University – Trinity Times
- University of the District of Columbia – Freevoice

== Florida ==
- Barry University – The Buccaneer
- Bethune–Cookman University – Voice of the Wildcats
- Broward College – The Observer
- College of Central Florida – The Patriot Press
- Daytona State College – In Motion
- Eckerd College – The Current
- Embry–Riddle Aeronautical University – The Avion
- Flagler College – The Gargoyle
- Florida A&M University – The Famuan
- Florida Atlantic University – University Press
- Florida Gulf Coast University – Eagle News
- Florida Institute of Technology – The Crimson
- Florida International University – PantherNOW
- Florida Southern College – The Southern
- Florida SouthWestern State College – The FSW Compass
- Florida State University – FSView & Florida Flambeau
- Jacksonville University – The Navigator
- Lake–Sumter State College – The Angler
- Lynn University – iPulse
- Miami Dade College – The Reporter
- New College of Florida – The Catalyst
- Nova Southeastern University – The Current
- Palm Beach Atlantic University – The Beacon
- Pensacola State College – The Corsair
- Rollins College – The Sandspur
- Saint Leo University – The Lions' Pride
- St. Petersburg College – The Sandbox
- Stetson University – The Reporter
- Tallahassee Community College – The Talon
- University of Central Florida – NSM Today, Central Florida Future
- University of Florida – The Independent Florida Alligator, The Fine Print
- University of Miami – The Miami Hurricane
- University of Miami School of Law – Res Ipsa Loquitur
- University of North Florida – The Spinnaker
- University of South Florida – The Oracle
- University of Tampa – The Minaret
- University of West Florida – The Voyager
- Valencia College – The Valencia Voice

== Georgia ==
- Abraham Baldwin Agricultural College – The Stallion
- Agnes Scott College – The Profile
- Augusta University – Bell Ringer
- Berry College – Campus Carrier
- Brenau University – The Alchemist
- Clark Atlanta University – The Panther
- Clayton State University – The Bent Tree
- Covenant College – The Bagpipe
- East Georgia State College – The Hoopee Bird
- Emory University – The Emory Wheel
- Georgia College & State University – The Colonnade
- Georgia Gwinnett College – The Globe
- Georgia Highlands College – Six Mile Post
- Georgia Institute of Technology (Georgia Tech) – The Technique
- Georgia Southern University – The George-Anne
- Georgia Southwestern State University – The Sou'Wester
- Georgia State University – The Signal
- Kennesaw State University – The Sentinel
- Mercer University – The Mercer Cluster
- Middle Georgia State University – The Statement
- Morehouse College – The Maroon Tiger
- Oglethorpe University – The Stormy Petrel
- Oxford College of Emory University – Oxford Spokesman
- Piedmont University – The Roar
- Savannah College of Art and Design – District
- Savannah State University – The Tiger's Roar
- Spelman College – The Blue Print
- Toccoa Falls College – The Talon
- University of Georgia – The Red & Black
- University of North Georgia – The Vanguard
- University of West Georgia – The West Georgian
- Valdosta State University – The Spectator
- Young Harris College – Enotah Echoes

== Hawaii ==
- Hawaiʻi Community College – Ka 'Io Weekly News
- Hawaii Pacific University – Kalamalama
- Honolulu Community College – Ka La
- Kapiʻolani Community College – Kapio
- Kauaʻi Community College – Ka Leo O KCC
- Leeward Community College – Ka Manao
- University of Hawaiʻi at Hilo – Ke Kalahea
- University of Hawaiʻi at Mānoa – Ka Leo O Hawaii
- University of Hawaiʻi Maui College – Ho‘oulu
- Windward Community College – Ka Ohana

== Idaho ==
- Boise State University – The Arbiter
- Brigham Young University–Idaho – The Scroll
- College of Idaho – The Coyote
- Idaho State University – The Bengal
- Lewis–Clark State College – The Pathfinder
- North Idaho College – The Sentinel
- University of Idaho – The Argonaut

== Illinois ==
- Augustana College – Augustana Observer
- Blackburn College – The ‘Burnian
- Bradley University – The Scout
- Chicago State University – CSU News
- Columbia College – Columbia Chronicle
- DePaul University – The DePaulia
- East–West University – The Phantom Press
- Eastern Illinois University – The Daily Eastern News
- Elmhurst University – The Leader
- Eureka College – Pegasus
- Governors State University – GSU Phoenix
- Illinois Central College – ICC Harbinger
- Illinois Institute of Technology – TechNews
- Illinois State University – The Vidette
- Illinois Wesleyan University – The Argus
- Knox College – The Knox Student
- Lake Forest College – The Stentor
- Lake Land College – The Navigator News
- Lewis University – The Lewis Flyer
- Loyola University Chicago – Phoenix
- Millikin University – The Decaturian
- Monmouth College – The Courier
- Moraine Valley Community College – The Glacier
- National Louis University – The National
- Northeastern Illinois University – Independent
- Northern Illinois University – Northern Star
- Northwestern University – The Daily Northwestern
- Principia College – The Pilot
- Quincy University – QUMedia
- Southern Illinois University Carbondale – The Daily Egyptian
- Southern Illinois University Edwardsville – The Alestle
- University of Chicago – The Chicago Maroon, South Side Weekly
- University of Illinois Chicago – The Chicago Flame, The Argus, The Asterisk
- University of Illinois Springfield – The Observer
- University of Illinois Urbana–Champaign – Daily Illini
- Western Illinois University – Western Courier
- Wheaton College – The Wheaton Record

== Indiana ==
- Anderson University – Anderson University News and Events
- Ball State University – The Ball State Daily News
- Butler University – The Butler Collegian
- DePauw University – The DePauw
- Earlham College – Earlham College Word
- Franklin College – The Franklin
- Goshen College – Goshen College Record
- Grace College & Seminary – The Sounding Board
- Indiana State University – Indiana Statesman
- Indiana University Bloomington – Indiana Daily Student
- Indiana University Indianapolis – The Campus Citizen
- Indiana University Kokomo – The Correspondent
- Indiana University South Bend – The Preface
- Indiana University Southeast – The Horizon
- Ivy Tech Community College – The Campus Insider
- Marian University – The Marian Phoenix
- Purdue University – Purdue Exponent
- Purdue University Northwest – The Pioneer
- Rose-Hulman Institute of Technology – The Rose Thorn
- Taylor University – The Echo
- University of Indianapolis – The Reflector
- University of Notre Dame – The Observer and The Irish Rover
- University of Southern Indiana – The Shield
- Valparaiso University – The Torch
- Wabash College – The Bachelor

== Iowa ==
- Briar Cliff University – Cliff Network
- Buena Vista University – The Tack
- Coe College – The Cosmos
- Cornell College – The Cornellian
- Des Moines Area Community College – Campus Chronicle
- Dordt University – The Diamond
- Drake University – The Times-Delphic
- Graceland University – The Tower
- Grand View University – Viewfinder Media
- Grinnell College – The Scarlet and Black
- Iowa Central Community College – The Collegian
- Iowa State University – Iowa State Daily
- Kirkwood Community College – Communiqué
- Luther College – CHIPS
- Mount Mercy University – The Mount Mercy Times
- North Iowa Area Community College – Logos
- Northwestern College – Beacon
- Simpson College – Simpsonian
- St. Ambrose University – Buzz
- University of Dubuque – The Belltower
- University of Iowa – The Daily Iowan
- University of Northern Iowa – The Northern Iowan
- Upper Iowa University – The Collegian
- Waldorf University – The Lobbyist
- Wartburg College – The Trumpet
- William Penn University – Chronicle

== Kansas ==
- Baker University – The Baker Orange
- Benedictine College – The Circuit
- Bethany College – The Advocate
- Bethel College – The Collegian
- Emporia State University – The Bulletin
- Fort Hays State University – The Leader and The Edge
- Haskell Indian Nations University – The Indian Leader
- Kansas City Kansas Community College – Advocate
- Kansas State University – The Collegian
- Kansas Wesleyan University – The Advance
- McPherson College – The Spectator
- Newman University – The Vantage
- Pittsburg State University – Collegio
- Southwestern College – The Collegian
- Sterling College – Observer
- Tabor College – The View
- University of Kansas – University Daily Kansan
- University of Saint Mary – Spire-Times
- Washburn University – The Washburn Review
- Wichita State University – The Sunflower

== Kentucky ==
- Bellarmine University – The Concord
- Berea College – The Pinnacle
- Centre College – The Cento
- Eastern Kentucky University – The Eastern Progress
- Henderson Community College – The Hill
- Jefferson Community and Technical College – The Quadrangle
- Morehead State University – The Trail Blazer
- Murray State University – The Murray State News
- Northern Kentucky University – The Northerner
- Transylvania University – The Rambler
- University of the Cumberlands – The Patriot Newspaper
- University of Kentucky – Kentucky Kernel
- University of Louisville – The Louisville Cardinal
- Western Kentucky University – College Heights Herald

== Louisiana ==
- Baton Rouge Community College – BRCC Today
- Louisiana State University – The Daily Reveille
- Louisiana Tech University – The Tech Talk
- Loyola University New Orleans – The Maroon
- LSU New Orleans – Driftwood
- McNeese State University – The Contraband
- Nicholls State University – The Nicholls Worth
- Northwestern State University – The Current Sauce
- Southeastern Louisiana University – The Lion's Roar
- Southern University – The Southern Digest
- Grambling State University – The Gramblinite
- Tulane University – The Hullabaloo
- University of Louisiana at Lafayette – The Vermilion
- University of Louisiana at Monroe – The Hawkeye

== Maine ==
- Bates College – The Bates Student
- Bowdoin College – The Bowdoin Orient
- Colby College – The Colby Echo
- Southern Maine Community College – The Beacon
- University of Southern Maine – The Free Press
- University of Maine – The Maine Campus

== Maryland ==
- Anne Arundel Community College – Campus Current
- Frostburg State University – The Bottom Line
- Johns Hopkins University – The Johns Hopkins News-Letter
- Loyola University Maryland – The Greyhound
- McDaniel College – The Free Press
- Montgomery College – Advocate
- Morgan State University – The Spokesman
- Mount St. Mary's University - "The Mountain Echo"
- St. John's College – The Gadfly
- St. Mary's College of Maryland – The Point News
- Salisbury University – The Flyer
- Towson University – Towerlight
- University of Baltimore – The UB Post
- University of Maryland, Baltimore County – The Retriever Weekly
- University of Maryland, College Park – The Diamondback
- Washington College – The Elm
- Goucher College - The Quindecim

== Massachusetts ==
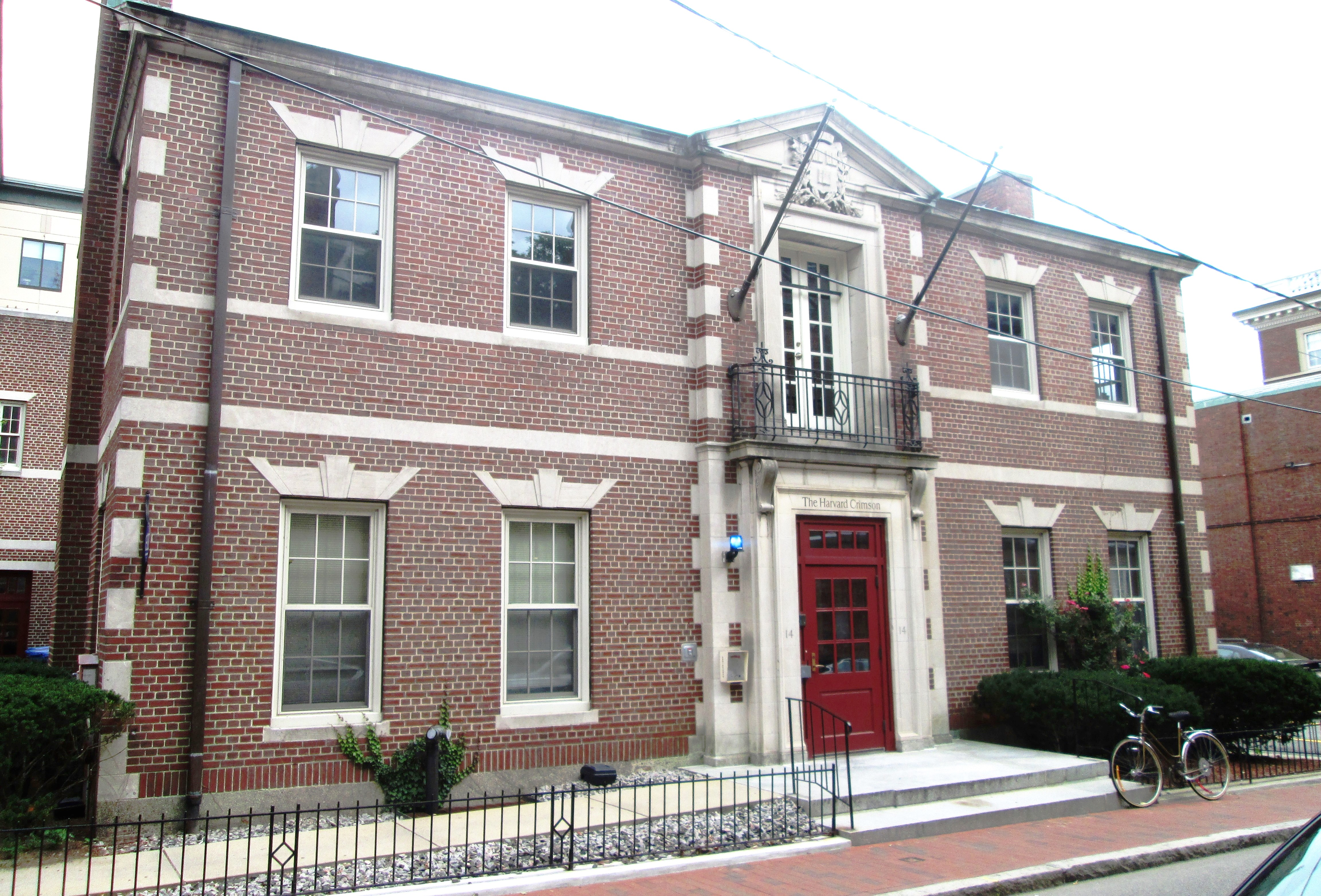
Office of The Harvard Crimson at Harvard University

- Amherst College – The Student
- Bay Path University – Network News
- Bentley University – The Vanguard
- Boston College –The Heights
- Boston University – Daily Free Press
- Brandeis University – The Brandeis Hoot, The Justice, The Blowfish (satirical)
- Bridgewater State University – The Comment
- Emerson College – The Berkeley Beacon
- Fitchburg State University – The Point
- Framingham State University – The Gatepost
- Gordon College – The Tartan
- Harvard Law School – Harvard Law Record
- Harvard University – The Harvard Crimson
- Massachusetts College of Liberal Arts – The Beacon
- MIT – The Tech
- Mount Holyoke College – Mount Holyoke News
- Northeastern University – The Huntington News
- Quincy College – The QC Voice
- Simmons University – The Simmons Voice
- Smith College – The Sophian
- Suffolk University – The Suffolk Journal
- Tufts University – Tufts Daily
- University of Massachusetts Amherst – Massachusetts Daily Collegian
- University of Massachusetts Boston – Mass Media
- University of Massachusetts Lowell – The Connector
- Wellesley College — The Wellesley News
- Wheaton College – Wheaton Wire
- Williams College – The Williams Record
- Worcester Polytechnic Institute – The Towers

== Michigan ==
- Albion College – The Pleiad
- Andrews University – The Student Movement
- Calvin University – Chimes
- Central Michigan University – Central Michigan Life, Grand Central Magazine
- Cornerstone University – The Herald
- Delta College – Delta Collegiate
- Eastern Michigan University – The Eastern Echo
- Grand Rapids Community College – The GRCC Collegiate
- Grand Valley State University – Grand Valley Lanthorn
- Hillsdale College – The Collegian
- Hope College – The Anchor
- Lake Superior State University – The Compass
- Madonna University – Madonna Herald
- Marygrove College – Mustang Matters
- Michigan State University – The State News
- Michigan Technological University – The Lode
- Oakland Community College – Highland Voice
- Oakland University – The Oakland Post
- University of Olivet – The Echo
- Saginaw Valley State University – The Saginaw Valley Journal and The Valley Vanguard
- Siena Heights University – Eclipse and Spectra
- Spring Arbor University – The Crusader and Blackbird Press
- St. Clair County Community College – The Erie Square Gazette
- University of Detroit Mercy – The Varsity News
- University of Michigan – The Michigan Daily, The Michigan Review, The Michigan Every Three Weekly
- University of Michigan–Dearborn – The Michigan Journal
- University of Michigan–Flint – The Michigan Times
- Washtenaw Community College – 'The Washtenaw Voice
- Wayne State University – The South End and The Wayne Review
- Western Michigan University – Western Herald

== Minnesota ==
- Augsburg University – The Echo
- Bemidji State University – Northern Student
- Bethel University – The Clarion
- Carleton College – The Carletonian
- College of Saint Benedict and Saint John's University – The Record
- Concordia College (Moorhead) – The Concordian
- Gustavus Adolphus College – The Gustavian Weekly
- Hamline University – The Oracle
- Luther Seminary – The Concord
- Macalester College – The Mac Weekly
- Metro State University - The Metropolitan
- Minnesota State University, Mankato – The Reporter
- North Central University – The Northerner
- St. Catherine University – The St. Catherine Wheel
- St. Cloud State University – University Chronicle
- St. Olaf College – Manitou Messenger
- St. Thomas – The Aquin
- Southwest Minnesota State University – The Spur
- University of Minnesota, Duluth – Statesman
- University of Minnesota Morris – The University Register
- University of Minnesota, Twin Cities – Minnesota Daily
- Winona State University – The Winonan

== Mississippi ==
- Alcorn State University – Campus Chronicle
- Jackson State University – The Blue & White Flash
- Mississippi Christian University – The Collegian
- Mississippi State University – The Reflector
- Mississippi Valley State University – The Delta Devils Gazette
- University of Mississippi – Daily Mississippian

== Missouri ==
- Lindenwood University – The Legacy
- Missouri Southern State University – The Chart
- Missouri State University – The Standard
- Missouri Western State University – The Griffon News
- Northwest Missouri State University – Northwest Missourian
- Penn Valley Community College – Spectrum
- Rockhurst University – Rockhurst Sentinel
- St. Louis Community College–Florissant Valley – The Forum
- St. Louis Community College–Meramec – The Montage
- Saint Louis University – The University News
- Southeast Missouri State University – The Capaha Arrow
- Truman State University – Index
- University of Central Missouri – The Muleskinner
- University of Missouri – The Maneater
- University of Missouri–Kansas City – Roo News
- University of Missouri–St. Louis – The Current
- Washington University in St. Louis – Student Life
- Webster University – The Journal

== Montana ==
- Montana State University – The Exponent
- University of Montana – Montana Kaimin

== Nebraska ==
- Chadron State College – The Eagle
- Creighton University – Creightonian
- Doane University – Doane Owl
- Hastings College — The Collegian
- Northeast Community College – The Viewpoint
- Nebraska Wesleyan University – The Yip
- University of Nebraska at Kearney – The Antelope
- University of Nebraska Omaha – The Gateway
- University of Nebraska–Lincoln – The Daily Nebraskan
- Wayne State College – The Wayne Stater

== Nevada ==
- Nevada State College, Henderson – The Scorpion's Tale
- University of Nevada – Nevada Sagebrush
- University of Nevada, Las Vegas – Rebel Yell

== New Hampshire ==
- Dartmouth College – The Dartmouth, The Dartmouth Review, The Dartmouth Independent, and the Dartmouth Free Press
- Keene State College – The Equinox
- Plymouth State University – The Clock
- Southern New Hampshire University – The Penmen Press
- University of New Hampshire – The New Hampshire

== New Jersey ==
- Bergen Community College – The Torch
- The College of New Jersey – The Signal
- County College of Morris – The Youngtown Edition
- Drew University – The Nut
- Fairleigh Dickinson University – The Equinox
- Kean Jersey City – The Gothic Times
- Kean University – The Tower
- Montclair State University – The Montclarion
- New Jersey Institute of Technology – The Vector
- Princeton University – The Daily Princetonian
- Ramapo College of New Jersey – The Ramapo News
- Rowan University – The Whit]
- Rutgers University – The Daily Targum
- Saint Peter's University – The Pauw Wow
- Seton Hall University – The Setonian
- Seton Hall University School of Law – The Cross Examiner
- Stevens Institute of Technology – The Stute
- William Paterson University – The Beacon

== New Mexico ==
- New Mexico State University – The Round Up
- New Mexico Tech – Paydirt
- St. John's College – The Moon
- University of New Mexico – New Mexico Daily Lobo
- Western New Mexico University – The Mustang

== New York ==
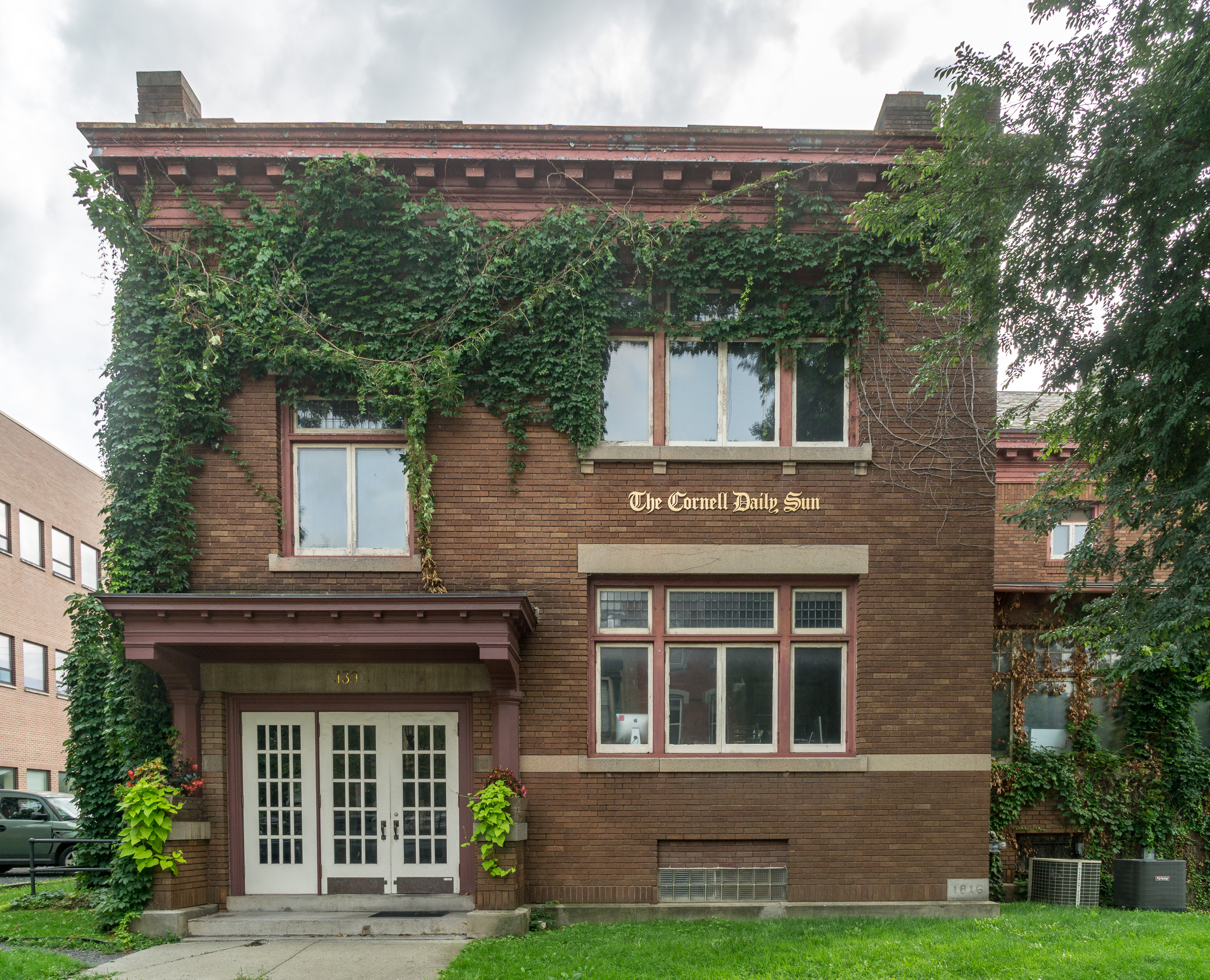
Office of The Cornell Daily Sun at Cornell University

- Adelphi University – Delphian
- Alfred University – Fiat Lux
- Baruch College – The Ticker
- Binghamton University – Pipe Dream, The Free Press
- Canisius University – The Griffin
- Cayuga Community College – The Cayuga Collegian
- The City College of New York – The Campus Magazine and The Paper
- Clarkson University – Clarkson Integrator
- Colgate University – The Colgate Maroon-News
- College of Staten Island – The Banner
- Columbia University – Columbia Daily Spectator and The Fed
- The Cooper Union for the Advancement of Science and Art – The Cooper Pioneer
- Cornell Law School – The Cornell Law Tower
- Cornell University – The Cornell Daily Sun, The Cornell Review, and The Cornell Moderator
- The Culinary Institute of America (Hyde Park campus) – La Papillote
- Five Towns College – The Record Online
- Fordham University – The Fordham Ram (Rose Hill), The Observer (Lincoln Center), and The Paper (satirical)
- Hamilton College – The Spectator
- Hartwick College – Hilltops
- Hobart and William Smith Colleges – The Herald
- Hofstra University – The Hofstra Chronicle
- Houghton University – The Houghton Star
- Hudson Valley Community College – The Hudsonian
- Iona University – The Ionian
- Ithaca College – The Ithacan
- Manhattan University – The Quadrangle
- Manhattanville University – Touchstone
- Marist University — The Marist Circle
- The New School — The New School Free Press
- New York University – Washington Square News
- Rensselaer Polytechnic Institute – The Rensselaer Polytechnic
- Rochester Institute of Technology – Reporter (full-color weekly college magazine)
- St. Bonaventure University – The Bona Venture
- St. Francis College – SFC Today
- St. John Fisher University – Cardinal Courier
- St. John's University – The Torch
- St. Lawrence University – The Hill News
- Skidmore College – Skidmore News
- State University of New York at Cortland – The Dragon Chronicle!
- State University of New York at Fredonia – The Leader
- State University of New York at Geneseo – The Lamron
- State University of New York at New Paltz – The New Paltz Oracle
- State University of New York at Oneonta – The State Times
- State University of New York at Oswego – The Oswegonian
- State University of New York at Potsdam – The Racquette
- SUNY Environmental Science and Forestry – The Knothole
- Stern College – Observer
- Stony Brook University – The Stony Brook Press
- Suffolk County Community College – The Compass (Ammerman Campus), The Western Student Press (Grant Campus)
- Syracuse University – The Daily Orange
- TAG Young Scholars - The TAG Times
- Union College – Concordiensis
- University at Albany – The Albany Student Press
- University at Buffalo – The Spectrum
- University of Rochester – Campus Times
- The Urban Assembly School for Emergency Management – The READY Report
- Utica University – The Tangerine
- Vassar College – The Miscellany News
- Villa Maria College – Villa Vibe
- Wagner College – The Wagnerian
- Yeshiva University – Commentator
- Westchester Community College – The Viking News
- Multiple campuses – Community College Campus News

== North Carolina ==
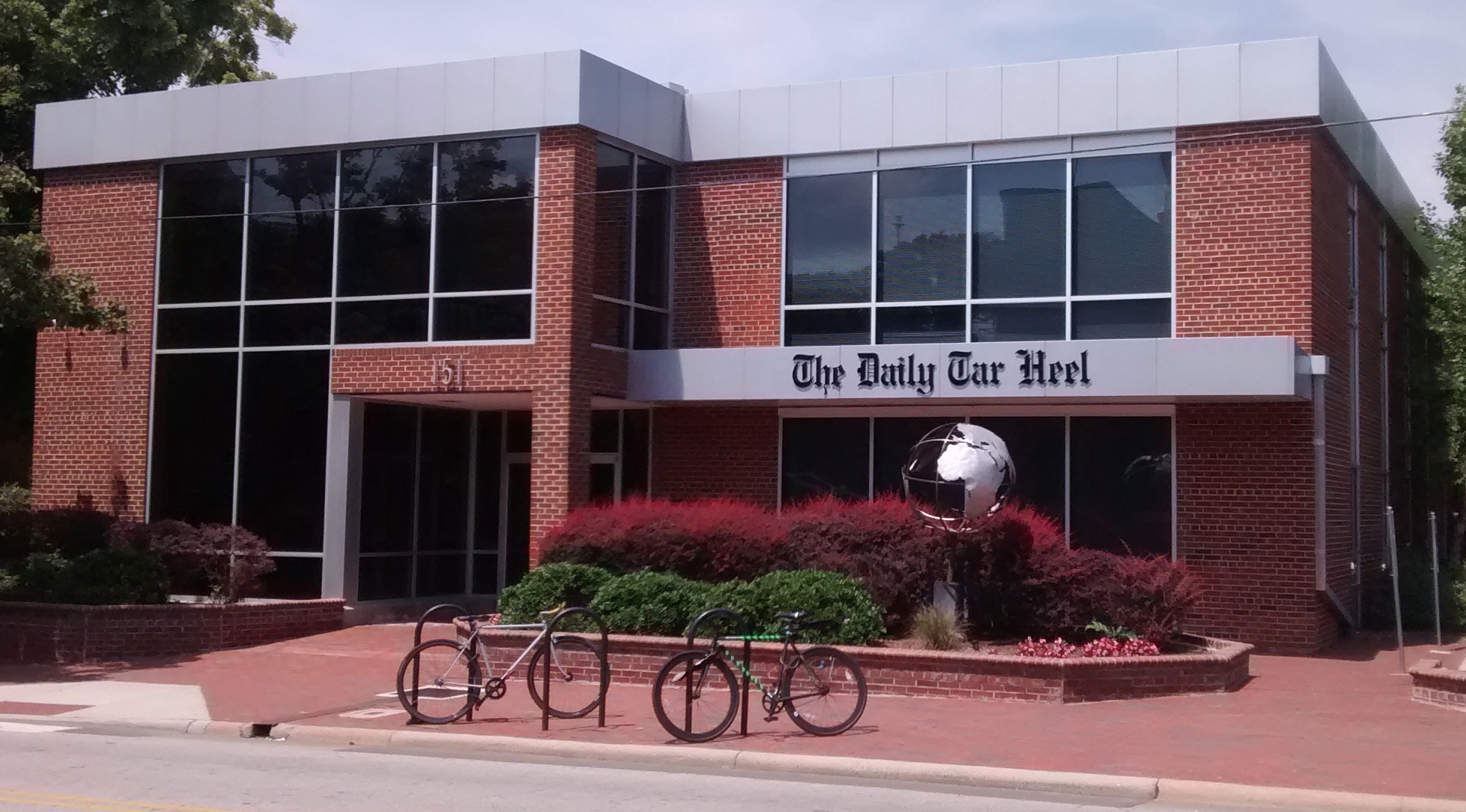
Office of The Daily Tar Heel at University of North Carolina at Chapel Hill

- Appalachian State University – The Appalachian
- Barton College – The Collegiate
- Belmont Abbey College – The Crusader
- Bennett College – The Bennett Banner
- Brevard College – The Clarion
- Campbell University – The Campbell Times
- Catawba College – The Pioneer
- Chowan University – The Chowanian
- Davidson College – The Davidsonian
- Duke University – The Chronicle
- East Carolina University – The East Carolinian
- Elizabeth City State University – The Compass
- Elon University – The Pendulum
- Fayetteville State University – The Voice
- Gardner–Webb University – GWU Today
- Greensboro College – The Collegian
- Guilford College – The Guilfordian
- High Point University – Campus Chronicle
- Johnson C. Smith University – The Bull's Eye
- Lenoir–Rhyne University – The Rhynean
- Livingstone College – Livingstone Newsletter
- Meredith College – The Meredith Herald
- Methodist University – Small Talk
- Montreat College – Whetstone
- North Carolina Agricultural and Technical State University – The A&T Register
- North Carolina Central University – The Campus Echo
- North Carolina State University – The Technician
- North Carolina Wesleyan University – The Decree
- Pfeiffer University – The Falcon's Eye
- Queens University of Charlotte – The Queens Chronicle
- Salem College – The Salemite
- Shaw University – The Bear Facts
- St. Augustine's University – The Pen
- University of Mount Olive – UMO Today
- University of North Carolina at Asheville – Banner
- University of North Carolina at Chapel Hill – The Daily Tar Heel
- University of North Carolina at Charlotte – The Niner Times
- University of North Carolina at Greensboro – The Carolinian
- University of North Carolina at Pembroke – The Pine Needle
- University of North Carolina at Wilmington – The Seahawk
- University of North Carolina School of the Arts – N.C. Essay
- Wake Forest University – Old Gold & Black
- Warren Wilson College – The Echo
- Western Carolina University – Western Carolinian
- William Peace University – The Peace Times
- Wingate University – The Weekly Triangle
- Winston-Salem State University – The News Argus

== North Dakota ==
- Minot State University – Red & Green
- North Dakota State University – The Spectrum
- University of Jamestown – The Collegian
- University of North Dakota – Dakota Student

== Ohio ==
- Ashland University – The Collegian
- Bowling Green State University – BG News
- Capital University – The Chimes
- Case Western Reserve University – The Observer
- Cedarville University – Cedars
- Cleveland State University – Cleveland Stater, The Cauldron, The Gavel
- College of Wooster – The Wooster Voice
- Denison University – The Denisonian
- John Carroll University – The Carroll News
- Kent State University – Daily Kent Stater
- Kenyon College – Kenyon Collegian, The Kenyon Observer
- Lorain County Community College – The Collegian
- Marietta College – The Marcolian
- Miami University – The Miami Student
- Mount St. Joseph University – Dateline
- Oberlin College – The Oberlin Review, The Grape, Fearless and Loathing
- Ohio Dominican University – The Tower
- Ohio Northern University – Northern Review
- Ohio State University – The Lantern, 1870, and The Sentinel
- Ohio University – The Post
- Ohio Wesleyan University – The Transcript
- Otterbein University – The Tan & Cardinal
- Sinclair Community College – The Clarion
- University of Akron – The Buchtelite
- University of Cincinnati – News Record
- University of Dayton – Flyer News
- University of Toledo – Independent Collegian
- Wilberforce University – The Mirror
- Wittenberg University – The Wittenberg Torch
- Wright State University – The Guardian
- Xavier University – Xavier Newswire
- Youngstown State University – The Jambar

== Oklahoma ==
- Cameron University – The Cameron Collegian
- Northwestern Oklahoma State University – Northwestern News
- Oklahoma Christian University – The Talon
- Oklahoma State University – The Daily O'Collegian
- Oral Roberts University – the Oracle
- University of Central Oklahoma – The Vista
- University of Oklahoma – The Oklahoma Daily / OU Daily
- University of Tulsa – The Collegian

== Oregon ==
- Clackamas Community College – The Clackamas Print
- Concordia University – Concordia Chronicles
- Corban University – Hilltop News
- Eastern Oregon University – Eastern Voice
- George Fox University – The Crescent
- Lane Community College – The Torch
- Lewis & Clark College – The Mossy Log
- Linfield University – The Linfield Review
- Linn-Benton Community College – The Commuter
- Mt. Hood Community College – The Advocate
- Oregon Institute of Technology – The Edge
- Oregon State University – The Daily Barometer
- Pacific University – The Pacific Index
- Portland State University – The Daily Vanguard
- Reed College – The Quest
- Southern Oregon University – The Siskiyou
- University of Oregon – Daily Emerald
- University of Portland – The Beacon
- Western Oregon University – The Western Oregon Journal
- Willamette University – The Collegian

== Pennsylvania ==
- Allegheny College – The Campus
- Arcadia University – The Tower
- Bryn Mawr College – The College News
- Bryn Mawr College and Haverford College – The Bi-College News
- Bucknell University – The Bucknellian
- Cabrini University – Loquitur Media
- Carnegie Mellon University – The Tartan
- Chatham University – The Communiqué
- Chestnut Hill College – The Griffin
- Commonwealth University-Bloomsburg – The Voice
- Community College of Philadelphia – The Student Vanguard
- Dickinson College – The Dickinsonian
- Drexel University – The Triangle
- Duquesne University – The Duquesne Duke
- Elizabethtown College – The Etownian
- Franklin and Marshall College – The College Reporter
- Gannon University – The Gannon Knight
- Gettysburg College – The Gettysburgian, The Gburg Forum
- Haverford College and Bryn Mawr College – The Bi-College News
- Indiana University of Pennsylvania – The Penn
- Juniata College – The Juniatian
- King's College - The Crown
- Kutztown University – The Keystone
- La Salle University – The Collegian
- Lafayette College – The Lafayette
- Lehigh University – The Brown and White
- Mercyhurst University – The Merciad
- Millersville University – The Snapper
- Moravian University – The Comenian
- Muhlenberg College – The Muhlenberg Weekly
- Pennsylvania State University (Altoona Campus) – The Altoona Collegiate Review
- Pennsylvania State University (Beaver Campus) – The Roar
- Pennsylvania State University (Brandywine Campus) – The Lion's Eye
- Pennsylvania State University (Erie Campus) – The Behrend Beacon
- Pennsylvania State University (University Park Campus) – Daily Collegian
- PennWest California – Cal Times
- PennWest Edinboro – The Spectator
- Point Park University- The Globe
- Saint Joseph's University – The Hawk
- Slippery Rock University – The Rocket
- Susquehanna University – The Quill
- Swarthmore College – The Phoenix, Voices
- Temple University – Temple Times, The Temple News
- University of Pennsylvania – The Daily Pennsylvanian
- University of Pittsburgh – The Pitt News
- University of Pittsburgh at Johnstown – The Advocate
- University of Scranton – The Aquinas
- Villanova University – The Villanovan
- Washington & Jefferson College – Red & Black
- West Chester University – The Quad
- Westminster College – The Holcad
- Wilkes University - The Beacon

== Rhode Island ==
- Brown University – The Brown Daily Herald
- Bryant University – The Archway
- Community College of Rhode Island – The Unfiltered Lens
- Johnson and Wales University – The Campus Herald
- Providence College – The Cowl
- Rhode Island College – The Anchor
- Roger Williams University – The Hawks' Herald
- University of Rhode Island –- The Good 5 Cent Cigar

== South Carolina ==
- The Citadel, The Military College of South Carolina – The Brigadier
- Clemson University – The Tiger
- Coastal Carolina University – The Chanticleer
- College of Charleston – The Yard – CisternYard News, CisternYard Media
- South Carolina State University – The Collegian
- University of South Carolina – The Daily Gamecock
- University of South Carolina Aiken – Pacer Times
- University of South Carolina Spartanburg – The Carolinian
- Winthrop University – The Johnsonian

== South Dakota ==
- Augustana University – The Augustana Mirror
- Dakota State University – Trojan Times
- The South Dakota School of Mines and Technology – The Aurum
- South Dakota State University – The Collegian
- University of South Dakota – Volante

== Tennessee ==
- Austin Peay State University – The All State
- Belmont University – Belmont Vision
- Covenant College – The Bagpipe
- East Tennessee State University – East Tennessean
- Fisk University – Fisk Forum
- Lee University – The Lee Clarion
- Maryville College - The Highland Echo
- Middle Tennessee State University – Sidelines
- Tennessee State University – The Meter
- Tennessee Technological University – The Oracle
- Union University – Cardinal & Cream
- University of Memphis – The Daily Helmsman
- University of the South – The Sewanee Purple
- University of Tennessee – The Daily Beacon
- University of Tennessee at Martin – The Pacer
- University of Tennessee, Chattanooga – The University Echo
- Vanderbilt University – The Vanderbilt Hustler, Vanderbilt Orbis

== Texas ==
- Abilene Christian University – The Optimist
- Amarillo College – The Ranger
- Angelo State University – Ram Page
- Austin College – The Observer
- Baylor University – The Baylor Lariat and The Rope (satirical)
- Brazosport College – The Navigator
- Del Mar College – Del Mar Foghorn
- East Texas A&M University – The East Texan, ceased publication in 2021.
- Eastfield College – The Et Cetera
- Houston Christian University – The Daily Collegian
- Kilgore College – The Flare
- Lamar University – The University Press
- Midwestern State University – The Wichitan
- Lone Star College–North Harris – North Star News
- Northeast Texas Community College – The Eagle
- Prairie View A&M University – The Panther
- Rice University – The Rice Thresher
- Richland College – The Chronicle
- Sam Houston State University – The Houstonian
- San Antonio College – The Ranger
- South Plains College – The Plainsman Press
- Southern Methodist University – The Daily Campus
- Southwestern University – The Megaphone
- Stephen F. Austin State University – The Pine Log
- St. Edward's University – Hilltop Views
- St. Mary's University -- The Rattler
- Sul Ross State University – The Skyline
- Tarleton State University – J-Tac
- Tarleton State University – Texan News Service
- Tarrant County College – The Collegian
- Texas A&M University – The Battalion
- Texas A&M University–Victoria – The Flame
- Texas Christian University – TCU Daily Skiff
- Texas Southern University – The TSU Herald
- Texas State University – The University Star
- Texas Tech University – The Daily Toreador
- Texas Woman's University – The Lasso
- Trinity University – The Trinitonian
- Tyler Junior College – The DrumBeat
- University of Houston – The Daily Cougar
- University of Houston–Clear Lake – The Signal
- University of Houston–Downtown – The Dateline Downtown
- University of Mary Hardin–Baylor – The Bells
- University of North Texas – North Texas Daily
- University of St. Thomas – The Summa
- University of Texas at Arlington – The Shorthorn
- University of Texas at Austin – The Daily Texan and The Texas Travesty
- University of Texas at Brownsville – The Collegian
- University of Texas at Dallas – The Mercury
- University of Texas at El Paso – The Prospector
- University of Texas at Rio Grande Valley – The Rider
- University of Texas at San Antonio – The Paisano
- University of Texas at Tyler – The Patriot Talon
- University of Texas-Pan American – The Pan-American
- West Texas A&M University – The Prairie

== Utah ==
- Brigham Young University – The Universe
- Southern Utah University — University Journal
- University of Utah – Daily Utah Chronicle
- Utah State University – Utah Statesman
- Utah Valley University – UVU Review
- Weber State University – The Signpost

== Vermont ==
- Bennington College – The Bennington Free Press, Before the End of the World
- Middlebury College – The Campus
- Norwich University – The Guidon
- Saint Michael's College – The Defender
- University of Vermont – The Vermont Cynic
- Vermont State University Johnson – Basement Medicine
- Vermont State University Lyndon – The Critic

== Virginia ==
- Averett University – The Chanticleer
- Christopher Newport University – The Captain's Log
- College of William and Mary – The Flat Hat
- Eastern Mennonite University – The Weather Vane
- Ferrum College – Iron Blade
- George Mason University – Fourth Estate
  - George Mason University School of Law – The Docket
- Hollins University – Hollins Columns
- James Madison University – The Breeze
- Liberty University – The Liberty Champion
- Longwood University – The Rotunda
- University of Lynchburg – The Critograph
- Marymount University – The Banner
- Old Dominion University – The Mace & Crown
- Radford University – The Tartan
- Randolph College – The Sundial
- Randolph-Macon College – The Yellow Jacket
- University of Mary Washington – The Weekly Ringer
- University of Richmond – The Collegian
- University of Virginia – The Cavalier Daily, The Declaration
- University of Virginia's College at Wise – The Highland Cavalier
- Virginia Commonwealth University – The Commonwealth Times
- Virginia Military Institute – The Cadet
- Virginia Tech – Collegiate Times
- Washington and Lee University – The Ring-Tum Phi

== Washington ==
- Bellevue College – The Jibsheet (renamed to The Watchdog)'
- Central Washington University – The Observer
- Clark College – The Independent
- Eastern Washington University – The Easterner
- Edmonds College – The Triton Review
- Evergreen State College – Cooper Point Journal
- Everett Community College – The Clipper
- Gonzaga University – The Gonzaga Bulletin
- Green River Community College – The Current
- Pacific Lutheran University – The Mooring Mast
- Pierce College, Puyallup – The Puyallup Post
- Pierce College, Fort Steilacoom – Pierce Pioneer
- Seattle Central Community College – The Seattle Collegian
- Seattle Pacific University – The Falcon
- Seattle University – The Spectator
- Shoreline Community College – The Ebbtide
- Spokane Falls Community College – The Communicator
- University of Puget Sound – The Puget Sound Trail
- University of Washington Bothell - The Husky Herald
- University of Washington – The Daily of the University of Washington
- University of Washington Tacoma – The Ledger
- Walla Walla University – The Collegian
- Washington State University – The Daily Evergreen
- Washington State University Vancouver – The VanCougar
- Western Washington University – Western Front
- Whitman College – The Pioneer
- Whitworth University – The Whitworthian

== West Virginia ==
- Alderson-Broaddus University – The Battler Columns
- Bethany College – The Tower
- Concord University – The Concordian
- Davis and Elkins College – The Senator
- Fairmont State University – The Columns
- Glenville State University – The Phoenix
- Marshall University – The Parthenon
- Ohio Valley University – The Highlander
- Salem International University – The Green & White
- Shepherd University – The Picket
- University of Charleston – The Eagle
- West Liberty University – The Trumpet
- West Virginia State University – The Yellow Jacket
- West Virginia University – The Daily Athenaeum, The Mountaineer Jeffersonian
- West Virginia University at Parkersburg – The Chronicle
- West Virginia Wesleyan College – The Pharos
- Wheeling Jesuit University – The Cardinal Connection

== Wisconsin ==
- Alverno College – Alverno Alpha
- Beloit College – The Round Table
- Carroll University – The New Perspective
- Lawrence University – The Lawrentian
- Madison Area Technical College – The Clarion
- Marquette University – Marquette Tribune, The Warrior
- Milwaukee Institute of Art & Design – The Streaming Rat
- Milwaukee School of Engineering – Ingenium
- St. Norbert College – St. Norbert Times
- University of Wisconsin–Eau Claire – The Spectator
- University of Wisconsin–Green Bay – The Fourth Estate
- University of Wisconsin–La Crosse – The Racquet
- University of Wisconsin–Madison – The Daily Cardinal, The Badger Herald, The Madison Misnomer, and The Mendota Beacon (defunct)
- University of Wisconsin-Milwaukee – The UWM Post, The Leader, and Frontpage Milwaukee
- University of Wisconsin-Oshkosh – Advance-Titan
- University of Wisconsin-Parkside – The Ranger News
- University of Wisconsin-Platteville – The Exponent
- University of Wisconsin-River Falls – Student Voice
- University of Wisconsin-Stevens Point – The Pointer
- University of Wisconsin-Stout – The Stoutonia
- University of Wisconsin-Superior – The Stinger
- University of Wisconsin-Whitewater – The Royal Purple

== Wyoming ==
- Laramie County Community College – Wingspan
- Northwest College – Northwest Trail
- University of Wyoming – The Branding Iron

== See also ==
- List of student newspapers
- List of student newspapers in Canada
- List of student newspapers in the United Kingdom
- National Pacemaker Awards
