= Sentinel (newspaper) =

A variety of newspapers are called Sentinel or The Sentinel, including:

- Daily Sentinel, based in Rome, New York
- The Daily Sentinel (Texas), based in Nacogdoches, Texas
- Daily Sitka Sentinel, based in Sitka, Alaska
- Dawson Sentinel, published in Dawson, Minnesota.
- Grand Junction Daily Sentinel, published in western Colorado
- Hanford Sentinel, published in Hanford, California
- Jewish Sentinel, or simply The Sentinel, newspaper.
- The Holland Sentinel, published in Holland, Michigan
- Knoxville News Sentinel, published in Knoxville, Tennessee
- Los Angeles Sentinel, published in Los Angeles, California
- Mendon-Honeoye Falls-Lima Sentinel, published in Mendon, New York
- Milwaukee Journal Sentinel, published in Milwaukee, Wisconsin
- Montgomery County Sentinel, published in Montgomery County, Maryland
- New York Daily Sentinel, America’s first daily labor newspaper
- The News-Sentinel, published in Fort Wayne, Indiana
- Orlando Sentinel, published in Orlando, Florida
- Rochester Sentinel (disambiguation), various newspapers
- San Francisco Sentinel, published in San Francisco, California
- Santa Cruz Sentinel, published in Santa Cruz, California
- Scottsboro Daily Sentinel, published in Scottsboro, Alabama
- Sentinel, a group of local newspapers in Essex and Monmouth counties, New Jersey, published by Greater Media
- The Sentinel, a weekly newspaper published in Sangamon County, Illinois
- The Sentinel, an online political newspaper established by the Kansas Policy Institute.
- Sentinel (Fairmont), published in Fairmont, Martin County, Minnesota
- The Sentinel (Guwahati), an English daily newspaper with four editions in Assam and nearby Northeastern India
- The Sentinel (KSU), student newspaper of Kennesaw State University published in Kennesaw, Georgia
- The Sentinel (Pennsylvania), published in Carlisle, Pennsylvania
- The Sentinel (Rockhurst University), the official student newspaper of Rockhurst University
- The Sentinel (Staffordshire), published in Stoke-on-Trent, England
- St. Louis Sentinel, published in St. Louis, Missouri
- Sun-Sentinel, published in Fort Lauderdale, Florida and Broward County
- Twin City Sentinel, published in Winston-Salem, North Carolina
- The Valley Sentinel, published in Valemount, British Columbia, Canada
