= Rochester Sentinel =

Rochester Sentinel is the name of a number of current and former newspapers. These include:

- The Rochester Sentinel, a newspaper based in Rochester New York since 1858
- The Rochester Sentinel, a 1910s American-American special interest newspaper, based in Rochester New York, featuring the work of F. Grant Gilmore.
- The Rochester (Ind.) Sentinel, a newspaper based in Indiana, owned by Paxton Media Group since 2019.
