= The Mercer Cluster =

Official student news publication of Mercer University

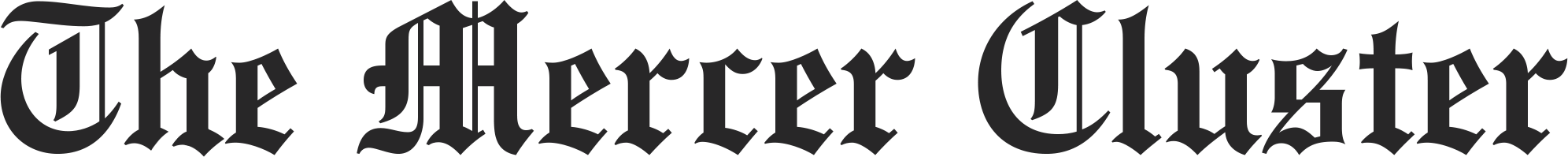

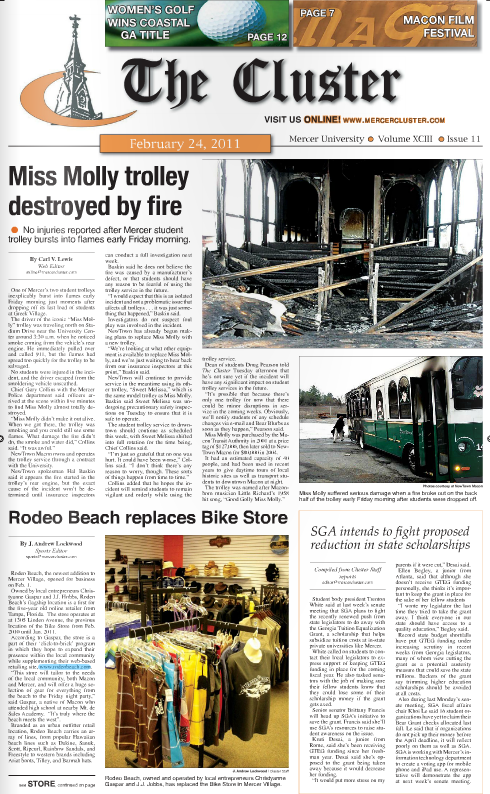
- The February 24, 2011 issue of The Mercer Cluster.
- Type: Student publication
- Format: Online newspaper
- School: Mercer University
- Founded: 1920
- Headquarters: The Center for Collaborative Journalism
- Website: mercercluster.com

The Mercer Cluster (sometimes The Cluster) is the official student news publication of Mercer University. Production of The Cluster's print edition is subsidized by Mercer's administration, but the paper retains full editorial autonomy as a student publication under the university's bylaws and receives no monetary subsidies for its digital products. Its staff is composed entirely of students, plus a faculty advisor who serves in a consulting role.

The cover of The Mercer Cluster s first issue, published on October 14, 1920.

== Origins ==
Students started publishing The Cluster in 1920. The paper received its name from a book of hymns penned by Mercer University founder and prominent Baptist minister Jesse Mercer in 1810, entitled The Cluster of Spiritual Songs, Divine Hymns, and Sacred Poems. Former Cluster contributors include longtime Atlanta publisher Jack Tarver, former U.S. attorney general Griffin Bell, attorney and author Robert Steed, novelist and physician Ferrol Sams and Atlanta Journal-Constitution editor J. Reginald Murphy. For most of its history, The Cluster has been the only newspaper published by students of Mercer University. In 1971, a group of students began publishing Mercer Today as an alternative to The Cluster, but the operation folded in 1977.

== Controversies ==
In October 2005, The Cluster ran an opinions piece and full-page advertisement in support of a pro-LGBT student organization's first annual "Coming Out Day". News of the event sparked a month-long dispute between university president R. Kirby Godsey and the Georgia Baptist Convention, eventually leading the religious group to sever its 170-year-old ties and multi-million dollar endowment to the university out of a concern that Mercer had, as a report by CNN put it, become "more liberal than its Southern Baptist roots" Since the split, Mercer has chosen to be no longer formally religiously affiliated.

== Present-day operations ==
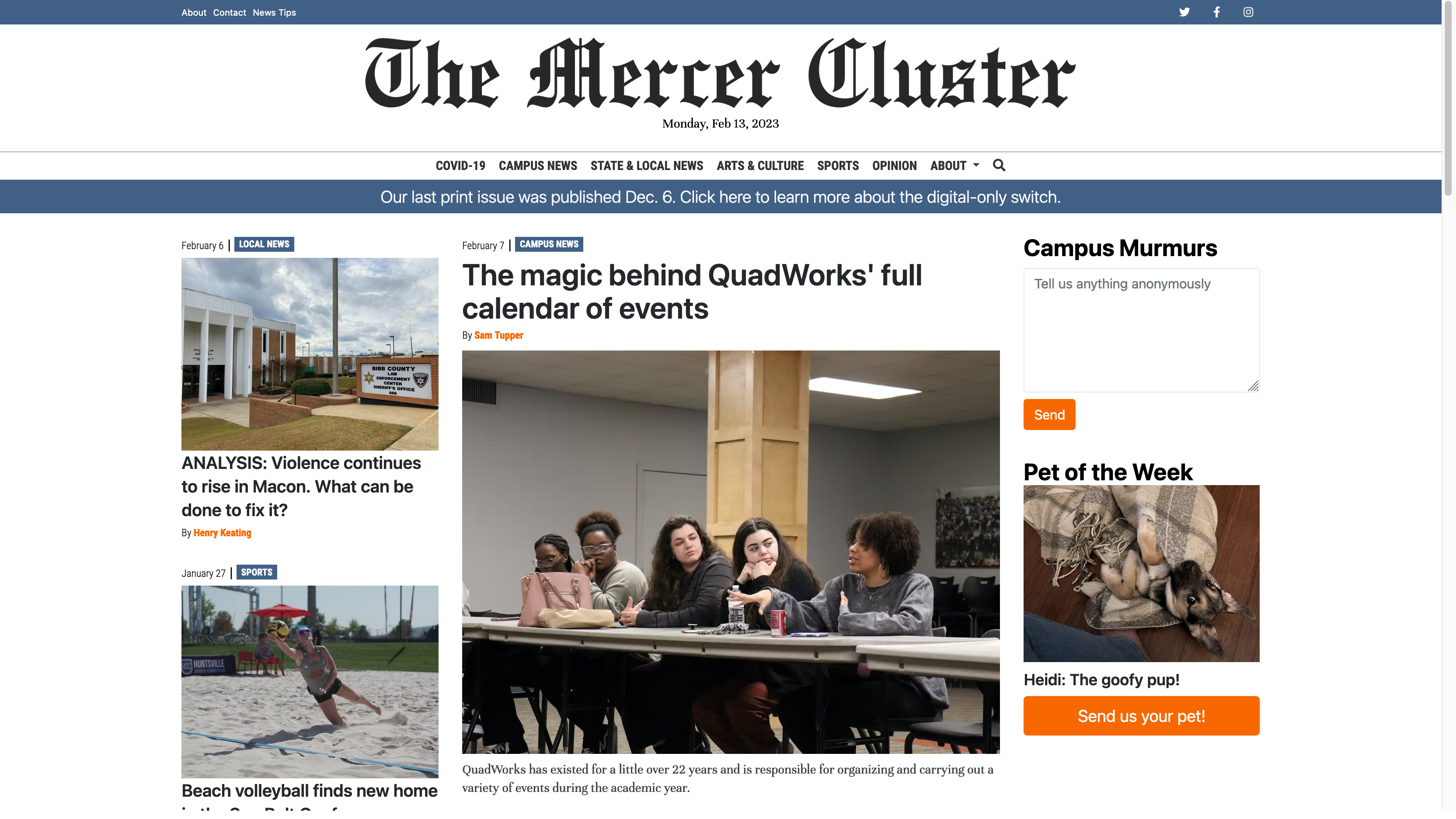
February 13, 2023 screenshot of The Mercer Cluster website.

In 2011, The Cluster launched its online edition in an effort to broaden its reach to students and the surrounding community, appointing its first digital editor, Carl V. Lewis. In fall of 2011, the paper also added a new "Local" section in an additional push to broaden its geographic reach to the increasingly gentrified neighborhoods that compose the surrounding College Hill Corridor area.

In 2014, the Digital Library of Georgia, in coordination with Mercer's Tarver Library, took on an ambitious multi-year project to digitize every printed issue of The Cluster since its founding. As of July 2015, all issues of the newspapers from 1920 to 1970 are available for searching and viewing at http://mercercluster.galileo.usg.edu.

In 2014, The Cluster's newsroom operations moved into the newly constructed Center for Collaborative Journalism, a facility that houses The Macon Telegraph's newsroom and Mercer's journalism and media studies department.

The Cluster shifted to a digital-only publication format in December 2022, when its final print issue was published. A letter from the 2021-2023 editor-in-chief published the day before the issue was published states: "It no longer makes sense for our organization, which is educational in nature, to continue to teach our staff how a print news system works when that is likely not what their jobs will look like upon graduation."
