= Escambia Amateur Astronomers Association =

Amateur astronomy club

The Escambia Amateur Astronomers Association (EAAA) is an amateur astronomy club in Northwest Florida.

== History ==
It was originally started in June 1959 by two elementary school students and one about to start junior high school. Originally known as the Warrington Amateur Astronomers Association, the first few years it operated informally as a backyard telescope group. As the membership gained in age, the club was renamed the Escambia Amateur Astronomers Association (EAAA) when the club went county-wide. Activities included star parties, meetings at the public library, and field trips, to the Pensacola Naval Air Station planetarium and centrifuge, to Spring Hill College observatory, to a high school astronomy club 100 miles (160 km) east-in DeFuniak Springs, Florida, The Walton County Astronomy Club. Both were Junior Member Clubs in the Astronomical League. In the 1960s many of the most active members left for college and a new generation of members replaced them. Soon, the club was printing a club newsletter—the "METEOR"—which is still in print. Sponsor Dr. Wayne Wooten edited it for 40 years, and former student Nicole Gunter has taken it over as part of her journalism work at the University of Florida.

The club became inactive in the 1970s. Activity resumed a few years later when the club founder Robert Blake returned to the area as a temporary replacement for the Pensacola Junior College astronomy instructor. He got together such of the old membership as were still in the area in late 1977 and planned a reactivation of the club with the facilities of the community college—such as their Owens Planetarium. With this backing, the club became more and more active. When the astronomy instructor returned, he donated the first large portable telescope to the club—permitting public viewing. Since the 1980s the club hosted a summer viewing program for the National Park Service at the Fort Pickens campground—taken over from a Pensacola Junior College professor Dr. Frank Palma who had previously given the programs. When an annular eclipse took place nearby in May 1984, the club raised the money for safe Mylar solar filter material and then gave programs to schools on how to safely watch the event—with filters handed out at no cost to the students. In 1982, Merry Edenton-Wooten became club president, and her astronomy-related business Draco Productions became the club's sponsor in 1992. She obtained permission from Thomas Baader to purchase and use the new solar filter material, and sell it in a variety of sizes. Draco Productions began making affordable, safe, and superior quality solar filters (endorsed by NASA and the Astronomical League) for naked-eye viewing as well as scope or binocular use with the new Baader solar filter film from the Baader Planetarium in Germany in 1990. Edenton-Wooten has also given many filters to school teachers and students. She believes that making these fine filters, telescopes, and astronomy educational materials available to everyone is her most important contribution to astronomy. For the August 2017 eclipse, Draco and the EAAA provided more than 5000 free safe solar filters to students and the public.

The club's gaze director Dewey Barker has added two other monthly events to the new moon gazes at Fort Pickens. The first quarter moon gazes are held at the Pensacola Beach Pavilion, and third quarter moon gazes at Big lagoon State Park, west of Pensacola. In a typical year, thousands of campers, families, students, and foreign tourists attend EAAA beach gazes. In 2010, EAAA sponsor Dr. Wayne Wooten won the Astronomical League Award for his four decades of helping organize astronomy clubs in Florida and Alabama.

== Associations ==
EAAA joined the Astronomical League in the 1960s and has been a member organization continuously—except when the club was inactive. Former EAAA President Merry Edenton-Wooten was the executive secretary of the Astronomical League from 1986–1992, and won its Wright Service Award from the AL in 1991. Sponsor Wayne Wooten won the Astronomical League Award in 2010 for his work promoting amateur astronomy in the South East.

== Equipment ==
The EAAA has made several attempts to build an observatory, including mounting a dome on top of an Avion travel trailer. But, light pollution made a permanent site impractical so a 16-inch (410 mm) telescope has its own trailer and is taken where needed for public viewing. The EAAA maintains a collection of loaner telescopes for member use for $1 per month rental fee. These now include a 16" Dobsonian, a Meade 16" SCT, a C-11. a Meade 10" SCT, an 8" Dobsonian, two 6" Newtonians, 11x80 binocs, and numerous 4" Newtonians.

Because of the generosity of members in sharing their instruments and time many people have been able to enjoy astronomy opportunities offered to the general public, scouting groups and schools.

In 1982, club president Merry Edenton-Wooten had the idea of using surplus Xerox copier lenses as objectives for beginner scopes. The "copier lens telescope" idea spread across the world, promoted by surplus suppliers like JerryCo and C&H Sales, and led to the construction of thousands of high quality rich field telescopes at very affordable prices.

Like many other astronomy clubs, the EAAA has since 2014 been donating 4" reflectors to local libraries. They have now placed seven of the loaner telescopes for the public to check out and use in Escambia and Santa Rosa county.

The EAAA has enlisted many student members at Pensacola State College and the University of West Florida. Since 2015, they have been involved in a "Galileoscopes for the Eclipse" project. Over 70 of the kits have been built by the students, fitted with safe Baader solar filters from Draco Productions and given to local schools in west Florida and South Alabama.

== Events ==
Escambia Amateur Astronomers Association set up meet dates to study the sky; typically, business meetings are on the Friday closest to the Full Moon for that calendar year.

For a current listing, refer to their Facebook page "Escambia Amateur Astronomers".[1][2]

== See also ==
- List of astronomical societies
