= Donald Downs =

American political science professor

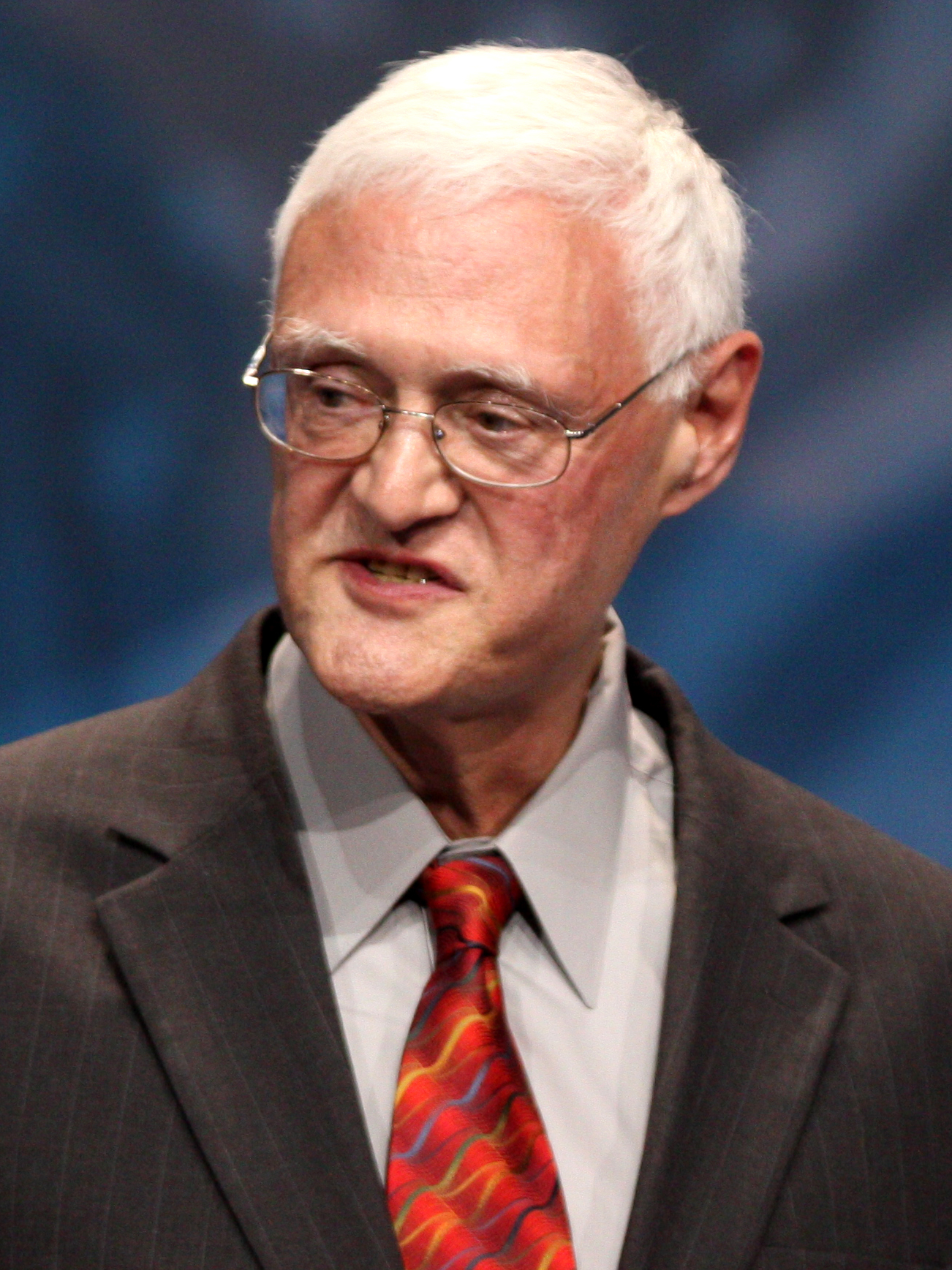
- Downs at CPAC in 2013
- Born: Donald Alexander Downs; December 2, 1948 (age 77)

Academic background
- Education: Cornell University; University of California, Berkeley
- Thesis: Freedom, community, and the First Amendment: the Skokie case and the limits of speech (1983)

Academic work
- Institutions: University of Wisconsin-Madison
- Main interests: First Amendment

Donald Alexander Downs (born December 2, 1948) is an American political science professor at the University of Wisconsin-Madison known for his work on the First Amendment.

== Education ==
Downs received his A.B. from Cornell University and his Ph.D. from the University of California, Berkeley.

== Career ==
Downs has taught at the University of Michigan and the University of Notre Dame and is currently Professor of Political Science, Law, and Journalism at UW-Madison and a Research Fellow at the Independent Institute. Downs has published many scholarly articles and books on the politics underlying central controversies in free speech, with a particular interest in recent years in academic freedom.

Downs is a co-founder of the Committee for Academic Freedom and Rights (CAFAR), and often speaks publicly in defense of academic freedom both at the University of Wisconsin–Madison and beyond.

In 2010 Downs was named the Alexander Meiklejohn Professor of Political Science at UW-Madison. He is also an affiliate professor of law and journalism at the university.

In 2012, Downs' book (co-authored by Ilia Murtazashvili) Arms and the University: Military Presence and the Civic Education of Non-Military Students. The book explores the historical and present relationship between the military and higher education, and argues that an appropriate presence of the military in the form of ROTC, military history courses, and strategic security studies expands the liberal and civic education of all students, and broadens the university's intellectual horizon.

Downs is a co-founder and present director of the Wisconsin Center for the Study of Liberal Democracy. The Center is dedicated to the understanding and critical evaluation of the central principles, policies, and practices of free societies, and to promoting genuine intellectual diversity on campus.

Downs is the faculty advisor of the Alexander Hamilton Society student chapter at UW-Madison. The Hamilton Society is a national student organization dedicated to discussing and debating important foreign policy and national security issues, and with thinking about the ways in which America can play a constructive role in international affairs.

He serves as a non-voting adviser on the Board of Directors of The Badger Herald, a student newspaper at UW-Madison.

Downs signed an open letter with other prominent academics, journalists, and politicians which both supported legally recognizing same-sex marriages and also called for respect for the rights of those who continue to oppose it.

== Key scholarly works ==
- Downs, Donald Alexander (1983). Freedom, community, and the First Amendment: the Skokie case and the limits of speech (Ph.D. thesis). University of California - Berkeley. OCLC 12277926.
- Downs, Donald Alexander (1989). The new politics of pornography. Chicago: University of Chicago Press. ISBN 9780226161631.
- Downs, Donald Alexander (1996). More than victims: battered women, the syndrome society, and the law. Morality and Society Series. Chicago: University of Chicago Press. ISBN 9780226161594.
- Downs, Donald Alexander (1999). Cornell '69 liberalism and the crisis of the American university. Ithaca, New York: Cornell University Press. ISBN 9780801478383.
- Downs, Donald Alexander (2005). Restoring free speech and liberty on campus. Oakland, California Cambridge, U.K. New York: Independent Institute Cambridge University Press. ISBN 9780521689717.
- Downs, Donald Alexander; Murtazashvili, Ilia (2012). Arms and the university: military presence and the civic education of non-military students. New York: Cambridge University Press. ISBN 9780521156707.
