= St. Bonaventure University =

Franciscan university in St. Bonaventure, New York, US

Coordinates: 42.078094°N 78.481307°W

- Former names: St. Bonaventure's College (1858–1950)
- Type: Private university
- Established: 1858; 168 years ago
- Religious affiliation: Catholic Church (Franciscan)
- Academic affiliations: ACCU; AFCU; NAICU; CIC
- Endowment: $123 million (2026)
- President: Dr. Jeff Gingerich
- Provost: Dr. David Hilmey
- Students: 3,053 (fall 2025)
- Undergraduates: 2,134 (fall 2025)
- Postgraduates: 919 (fall 2025)
- Location: St. Bonaventure, New York, U.S.
- Campus: Small town/rural, 500 acres (200 ha)
- Colors: Brown and white
- Nickname: Bonnies
- Sporting affiliations: NCAA Division I – Atlantic 10
- Mascot: The Bona Wolf
- Website: www.sbu.edu

St. Bonaventure University is a private Franciscan university in St. Bonaventure, New York, United States. The Western New York campus is home to 2,134 undergraduate and graduate students, with an additional 919 graduate students enrolled in online programs. The Franciscans established the university in 1858.

In athletics, the St. Bonaventure Bonnies play National Collegiate Athletic Association (NCAA) Division I sports in the Atlantic 10 Conference. Students and alumni often refer to the university as Bona's, derived from the school's name.

== History ==
The college was founded by Utica, New York, financier Nicholas Devereux, one of the first to gain land grants in newly surveyed Cattaraugus County from the Holland Land Company. Devereux founded the town of Allegany on the grant, hoping to build a new city. Devereux approached John Timon, the bishop of Buffalo, for assistance. The two invited the Franciscan order to Western New York, and a small group under Pamfilo da Magliano arrived in 1855. The school graduated its first class in 1858. St. Bonaventure's College was granted university status by New York State in 1950. The largest residence hall on campus, Devereux Hall, is named for the founder.

=== Franciscan connection ===
The university is named after Bonaventure, born John of Fidenza, who became a cardinal and Doctor of the Church. A theologian and contemporary of Thomas Aquinas at the University of Paris, he became head of the Franciscan order. Bonaventure was canonized in 1482 by Sixtus IV. The Franciscan friars at the St. Bonaventure Friary belong to the Holy Name Province and are members of the Order of Friars Minor, one of the orders of Franciscans.

The university is also home to the Franciscan Institute. Founded in 1939 by Thomas Plassmann, then president of St. Bonaventure's College, and led by its first director, Philotheus Boehner.

== Campus ==
The campus sits on 500 acres (2.0 km^{2}) in the town of Allegany, just over the line from the city of Olean (total pop.: 15,000), at Exit 24 of Interstate 86. The university has its own US Post Office and is listed as a separate census-designated place by the Census Bureau. The university's postal address is Saint Bonaventure, NY 14778.

== Academics ==
The university has more than 50 academic programs, including programs in the Jandoli School of Communication, School of Arts & Sciences, School of Business, School of Education, and The Dennis R. DePerro School of Health Professions.

=== Research ===
St. Bonaventure also has the Center for the Study of Attention, Learning & Memory, a joint initiative between the School of Education and the School of Arts and Sciences, promotes interdisciplinary research and increases awareness of the importance of attention and learning in education. The university also hosts the Franciscan Institute, which provides grants for research on the history and theology of the Franciscan Order.

=== Rankings ===
In the U.S. News & World Report's 2025 rankings of colleges and universities, St. Bonaventure University was ranked nineteenth (tie) among "Regional Universities North" and eighth in "Best Value Schools".

== Student life ==
=== Media ===
The campus newspaper, The Bona Venture, has been published continuously since 1926. Known on campus as The BV, the newspaper has earned The Pacemaker Award numerous times from the Associated Collegiate Press, the last time in 1994. The school's student radio station is known as WSBU 88.3 The Buzz. In 2019, the Jandoli School of Communication's student-produced newscast, "SBU-TV", became available to television viewers across Western New York.

=== Popular folklore ===
Thomas Merton, the Catholic monk and writer, taught English at St. Bonaventure for a year just at the start of World War II, living on campus on the second floor of Devereux Hall. During this time, he decided to join the Trappists, and later entered the monastery in Kentucky in 1941. A heart-shaped clearing on a mountain in view of campus is linked to Merton in campus myth. Some students call it "Merton's Heart" and claim that Merton visited the place often and that the trees fell when he died. In reality, the hillside had been cleared for oil drilling in the 1920s and trees have since regrown, leaving the bald patch.

== Athletics ==
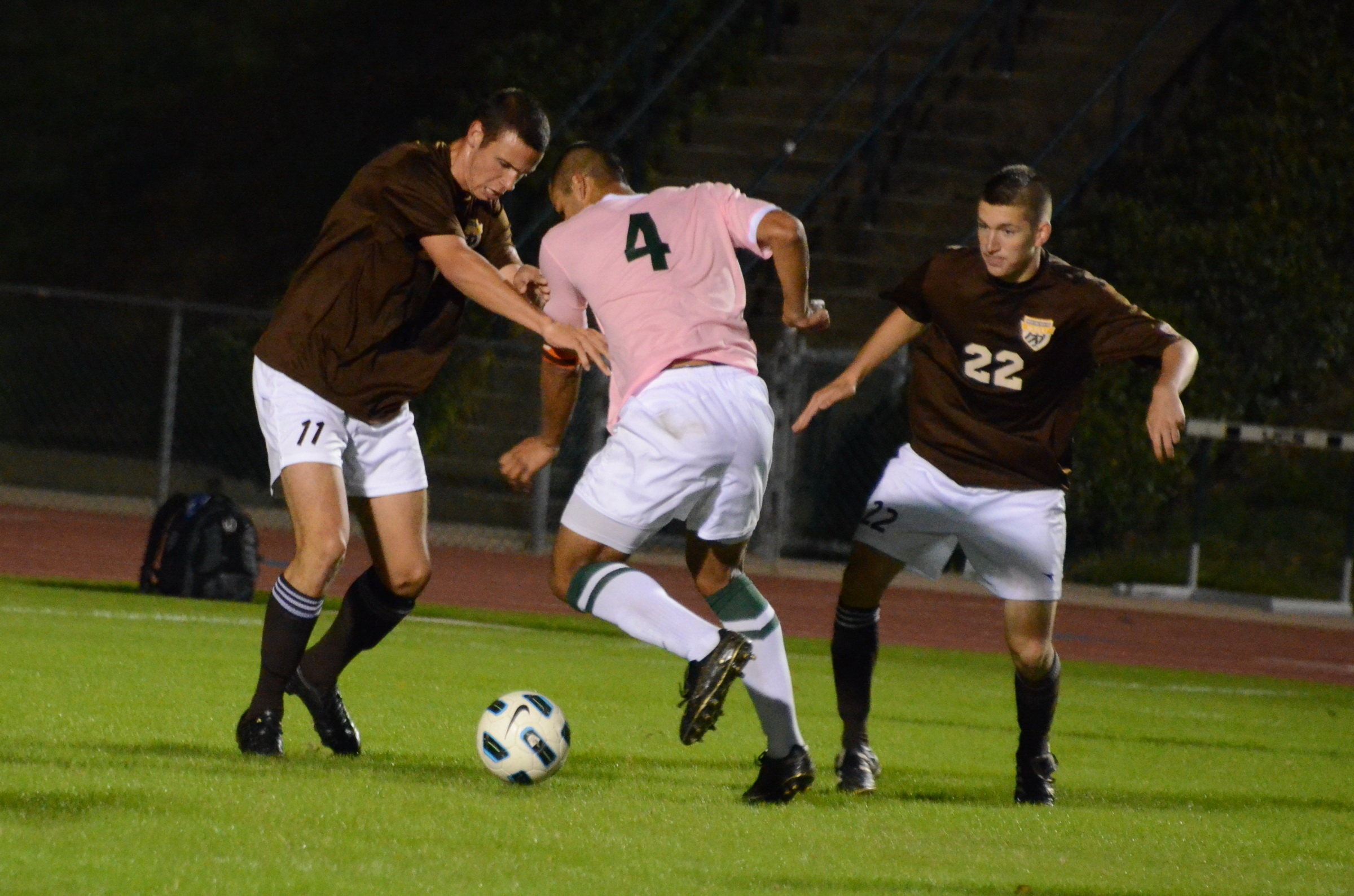
St. Bonaventure Bonnies men's soccer plays against the Charlotte 49ers men's soccer team in 2013

St. Bonaventure is an NCAA Division I member of the Atlantic 10 Conference and offers 19 varsity athletic programs. The school's programs are known as the Bonnies. The men's team has reached the NCAA men's basketball tournament a total of 8 times, most recently in the 2020–2021 season.

== Notable alumni ==
Six alumni of the university have received the Pulitzer Prize, including Dan Barry (1980), Bill Briggs (1985), Robert A. Dubill (1958), John Hanchette (1964), Charles J. Hanley (1968), and Brian Toolan (1972).
