= The Merciad =

Mercyhurst University student newspaper

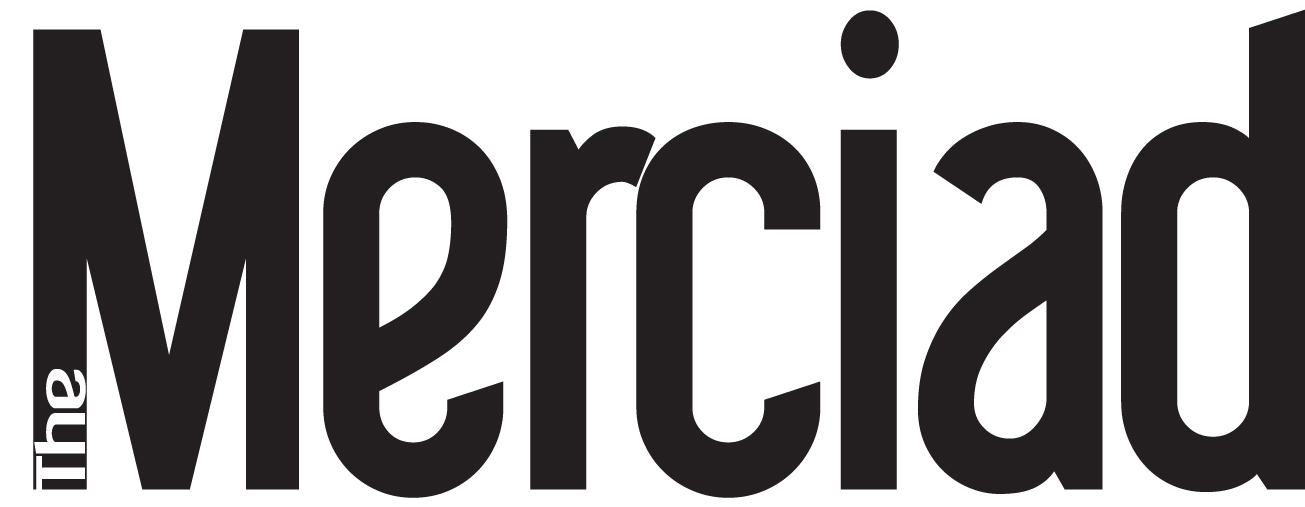
- Type: Weekly student newspaper
- Format: Tabloid
- Owner(s): Mercyhurst University
- General manager: Steph Przepiora, Bryan Colvin (advisors)
- Founded: 1929
- Relaunched: April 24, 2024
- Headquarters: Erie, Pennsylvania
- Website: merciad.mercyhurst.edu

The Merciad is the student newspaper at Mercyhurst University in Erie, Pennsylvania. The paper was founded in 1929. In 2007 the newspaper's slogan became "If you don't want it printed...don't let it happen," a slogan that is the same as that of the Aspen Daily News, however, the slogan was removed by Editor-in-Chief Mathew Anderson and the paper's staff in 2013 after being deemed unprofessional. It is a free tabloid-sized newspaper published every Wednesday while classes are in session, with the exception of the week before finals. The newspaper is the recipient of a "Best of Show" award presented February 2008, by the Associated Collegiate Press.

== The Merciad online ==
Print editions of The Merciad are published online at http://merciad.mercyhurst.edu in addition to breaking news and college updates.

In October 2022 it was announced The Merciad would be going fully digital.

In the final issue of the 2022-2023 school year, it was announced that The Merciad would be taking a hiatus to "reevaluate student-led media on campus".

On April 24, 2024, Vol. 97 Issue 1 was published, announcing the official return of The Merciad moving forward into the 2024-2025 school year.
