= The Bona Venture =

- Type: Student newspaper
- Founded: 1926; 99 years ago
- Headquarters: St. Bonaventure, New York, U.S.
- Website: thebvnewspaper.com

The Bona Venture is the student newspaper of St. Bonaventure University. The Bona Venture serves St. Bonaventure University and the city of Olean. It is free, and published weekly during the St. Bonaventure University academic year.

The paper has been printed continually since 1926. It had always been a weekly newspaper with the exception of a brief semi-weekly experiment in the early 1980s, and due to budget cuts in 2014.

Referred to in and around the campus as "The BV," the paper is published Fridays throughout the school year. There are 26 issues a year, a preview on the men's and women's basketball teams and a senior supplement at the end of the year.

All editors, writers and staff members of The Bona Venture are undergraduates who volunteer their time and skills.

In 2006, The Bona Venture launched its online edition. Subscribers can create an account and have updates e-mailed to them for free. Beginning in Fall 2007, the Web site will have exclusive online articles.

Many of The Bona Venture's editors and writers have gone on to excel in their field. Lee Coppola, the dean of St. Bonaventure's Jandoli School of Journalism and Mass Communication, and John Hanchette, a Pulitzer Prize winner and an associate professor at St. Bonaventure, each served as editor-in-chief. in 1964.

The BV has accounts on Facebook and Twitter, where breaking news and announcements are posted.
