= The Mendota Beacon =

- Type: Weekly student newspaper
- Format: Tabloid
- Owner(s): Mendota Publishing, LLC
- Publisher: no current
- Editor: no current
- Founded: 2005
- Ceased publication: 2007
- Political alignment: Conservative
- Headquarters: Madison, WI, U.S.

The Mendota Beacon was a free, privately funded biweekly (and later, weekly) published newspaper in Madison, Wisconsin between 2005 and 2007. It was formed in 2004 as a conservative alternative to the left-of-center The Badger Herald, The Daily Cardinal, and The Madison Observer that are distributed throughout the UW–Madison campus and downtown area. The name came from the fact that the campus is on the shore of Lake Mendota. The newspaper's motto was "Shining the Light on What's Right."

== Funding ==
The paper received its start-up capital from the conservative Leadership Institute, a 501(c)(3) non-profit organization located in Arlington, Virginia that teaches "political technology". Its first issue was on February 12, 2005.

== Staff ==
Founders of The Beacon included Tim Shea, Robert Thelen III, Bradley Vogel, Jordan Smith, Steven Schwerbel and Darryn Beckstrom.

In early 2006, Vogel and Schwerbel left The Beacon to join The Herald as an at-large member of the editorial board and a columnist, respectively.

Thelen was part of a feature article in Madison's independent weekly newspaper, Isthmus. The article was a point/counterpoint article about the Iraq war. Thelen's portion of the debate explained his support for the war and for the Bush administration.

In November 2005, competing progressive paper, The Madison Observer, accused the Beacon of cybersquatting madisonobserver.com and .net and redirecting web users to the Mendota Beacon's web page or a vandalized version of the Madison Observer page instead of www.madisonobserver.org. At the time, the ideologically opposite papers both claimed bi-weekly circulation of 5000.

== See also ==
- The Michigan Review
