= Clackamas Print =

Student newspaper of Clackamas Community College

The Clackamas Print
- The front page of the "Crisis in leadership" special edition of The Clackamas Print, from September 27, 2006
- Type: Student newspaper
- School: Clackamas Community College
- Editor-in-chief: Madyson Muresan; Jackson Smith
- Founded: 1966
- Headquarters: 19600 S Molalla Ave; Oregon City, OR 97045; United States
- Website: theclackamasprint.net

The Clackamas Print is the award-winning student newspaper of Clackamas Community College. It was established in 1966. According to the newspaper's staff and information box, its goal is to "report the news in an honest, unbiased and professional manner". The Print has a loose relationship with Clackamas News Online, the college's video journalism outlet. CNO is no incorporated into the paper's website, is mostly unaffiliated with the paper, and all video content has been replaced with a multimedia editor.

== Distribution ==
The paper is distributed once a term. It is distributed across the college's main campus by hand and mailed to the satellite campuses, and has been distributed off campus.

== Staff ==
Participation in The Print is offered through credit courses in Clackamas Community's journalism department. The staff consists of students who have signed up for at least one of the two production-oriented classes: one focusing on the writing and photography used in the paper, and the other to layout each week's paper.

== "Crisis in leadership" ==
In fall 2006, The Print broke a story about the college's president, Earl P. "Joe" Johnson, after he was asked to step down by eleven of the college deans. The incident drew attention not only toward Johnson himself, but also toward The Print. After the story was picked up by other area papers, including The Oregonian, columnist Andy Parker interviewed Print Co-Editor-In-Chiefs Sam Krause and Katie Wilson about their coverage of the situation. Krause and Wilson later won a first-place award from the 2007 Collegiate Newspaper Contest for their editorial on Johnson's separation from the college.
