= The Lamron =

American student newspaper

- Front page, January 30, 2014
- Type: Student newspaper
- Format: Broadsheet; online
- Founded: 1922
- Language: English
- Headquarters: Geneseo, New York
- Website: www.thelamron.com

The Lamron is the oldest student newspaper of the State University of New York at Geneseo. It was founded in 1922 and focuses on campus news and events, but also includes coverage of Geneseo, New York and the Rochester metropolitan area. It is published weekly on Thursdays, both in print and online.

== History ==
The Lamron was founded in 1922 and distributes to locations throughout campus and locally for free on Thursdays, except during examination and vacation periods. Funding is provided by mandatory student fees and advertising revenue. All content is overseen by student editors and volunteer student staff. The Lamron is printed by Messenger Post Newspapers, Canandaigua, New York.

The newspaper is led by the editor-in-chief; every section of the newspaper is headed by its own respective editor.
