= The Badger Herald =

Newspaper serving the University of Wisconsin-Madison community founded in 1969

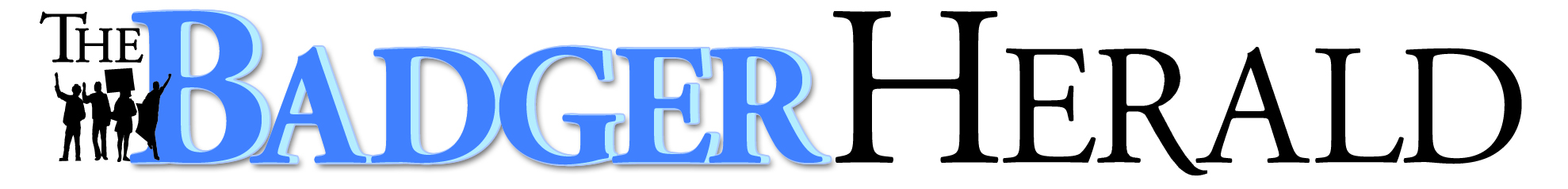
- Type: Student newspaper
- Format: Magazine tabloid
- Owner(s): The Badger Herald, Inc.
- Founded: 1969
- Political alignment: Center-left, formerly conservative
- Headquarters: Madison, Wisconsin
- ISSN: 0045-1304
- Website: badgerherald.com

The Badger Herald is a newspaper serving the University of Wisconsin–Madison community, founded in 1969. The paper is published Monday through Friday during the academic year and occasionally during the summer. Available at newsstands across campus and downtown Madison, Wisconsin, and published on the web, it has a print circulation of 6,000.

The Badger Herald, Inc., is a nonprofit corporation run entirely by University of Wisconsin–Madison students and funded solely by advertising revenue. The Board of Directors, which operates the company, is composed of nine UW students and three non-voting advisers, including noted First Amendment expert Donald Downs and former Republican congressional candidate John Sharpless.

The staff consists of nearly 100 students. The office is located off-campus at 152 W. Johnson St., Suite 202. The paper is printed by Capital Newspapers, Inc., home of the Wisconsin State Journal and The Capital Times.

== History ==
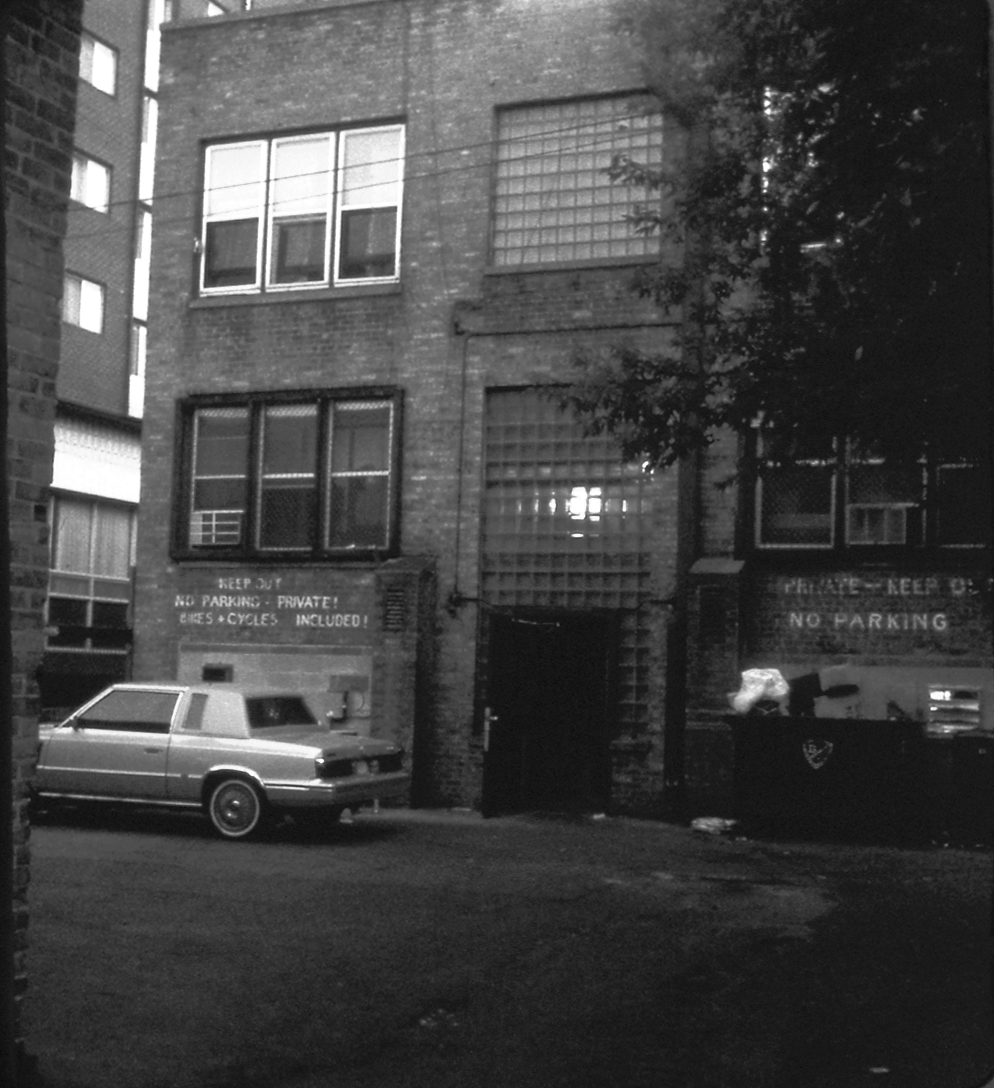
First Badger Herald offices at 638 State St., second floor, in 1988

The Badger Herald was founded in 1969 by a group of four students seeking a conservative alternative to the UW–Madison's primary student newspaper, The Daily Cardinal, which editorialized against the Vietnam War and had close ties to leaders of the radical campus protest movement. When anti-war activists detonated a truck bomb outside the university's Army Math Research Center on August 24, 1970, damaging several campus buildings and killing a post doc physics researcher, The Daily Cardinal editorially supported the bombers, saying "If Robert Fassnacht had died in Vietnam ... he would be a line in a news story – a number. And that is the reality that some of us have already died to change will struggle to change." While such attitudes were widespread on college campuses at the time, the Daily Cardinal—along with other college newspapers—helped coordinate and encourage activism against military research. The Daily Cardinal would later become more moderate in response to pressure from local media, the UW Board of Regents, staff members leaving, declining advertising revenue, and the radicalism of the 1960s and early 1970s dying down around the country.

Still, The Badger Herald formed in direct response to the then-radicalism of The Daily Cardinal and the campus. After several months of fund-raising, scrounging for desks and typewriters, and renting a walk-up office two blocks from the university's Bascom Hill at 538 State Street, the first issue of The Badger Herald was published on September 10, 1969. In the late 1970s, the Herald moved to 550 State Street. When the Herald moved to its office at 326 W. Gorham Street in 1998, the editors kept much of the furniture, including the original desks and homemade light board. Their offices are currently located 152 W. Johnson St. Suite 202.

Founding editor Patrick S. Korten received financial support for the new paper from nationally known conservative writer William F. Buckley after it ran into financial trouble in 1971. Buckley raised money for the struggling paper by giving a fund-raising dinner speech in Madison, with proceeds going to the paper. It is the only speech Buckley ever gave free of charge.

During the 1970s the paper remained solvent through advertising sales to businesses on the populous UW campus. The Herald has consistently refused offers of a subsidy from the university in order to maintain its editorial independence.

During that era, the paper maintained a consistently conservative editorial policy - one that has since been abandoned - on a campus that was considered so liberal that it was called "The Berkeley of the Midwest". The paper received regional attention and sparked a series of campus protests in 1976 and 1978 by publishing controversial opinion pieces titled, "Mao, Death of a Tyrant", "Top Commie Bites Dust", "Can Africans Rule Themselves?" and "Confronting the Lavender Menace or: The Case Against Homosexuality".

The Herald was the first newspaper in the state of Wisconsin to publish the work of Pulitzer Prize-winning editorial cartoonist, Jeff MacNelly, having signed the exclusive area rights from his syndicate in 1976.

The Badger Herald was first published as a weekly newspaper, went twice-weekly in 1974 and went daily in 1987. When the paper moved from weekly to daily, "its executive board calmed the editorial page's conservative voice," bringing it generally into line with the left-of-center political stance of The Daily Cardinal. In 2005, the short-lived Mendota Beacon attempted to fill the void left by the Herald's leftward shift by providing a conservative voice on campus.

Early on it established itself as a serious presence on campus, and by the early 1990s, overtook the much-older Daily Cardinal, in circulation and advertising revenue. By 1992, the once upstart conservative alternative campus newspaper had become the dominant newspaper on the 40,000 student University of Wisconsin–Madison campus.

In 2001 The Badger Herald published an advertisement by controversial conservative writer David Horowitz that argued against reparations for slavery. Weathering several protests and disruptions in circulation, the Herald refused to apologize for publishing the advertisement. After a flurry of national news coverage, the paper's status as an independent student newspaper stood firm.

The Herald's position was lauded in the Wall Street Journal, USA Today, and the Wisconsin State Journal. The Milwaukee Journal-Sentinel editorialized that the Herald is "living proof that the Constitution is a living document".

On February 13, 2006 The Badger Herald's editorial board published a controversial cartoon that depicted Muhammad. In the accompanying column titled "Sacred Images, Sacred Rights", the board said it considered the cartoon "offensive" but also deemed it "clearly newsworthy" and a "vehicle of facilitation in the grand marketplace of ideas". In May 2008, a controversial cartoon of David Horowitz, originally published in the University of Wisconsin–Milwaukee school newspaper, the UW–M Post, that depicted the conservative writer who is of Jewish-American heritage with a hooked nose, was republished on the front page of The Badger Herald. The coverage of this article, that was accompanied by the controversial cartoon, followed the pattern of The Herald's decision to reprint images considered taboo.

In February 2010, the Herald accepted a text ad on its website from Bradley Smith with the Committee for Open Debate on the Holocaust, a Holocaust denial organization. The Herald Editor in Chief at the time, Jason Smathers, defended the decision based on the belief that the community was strong enough to see and reject the ad. After a strong push back from the university community, of which at least 25 percent is Jewish, the newspaper said it regretted the pain the decision caused but ultimately kept the ad up for the entirety of its month-long run. In March 2010, the United States Holocaust Museum used the newspaper's decision in a form letter soliciting donations from members.

In 2013, The Badger Herald became an "online-first" publication, with print editions twice weekly. In 2015, the paper announced it would cut down its print editions to a weekly tabloid product. Then, during COVID-19, the paper further reduced their print editions to once per month on paper and once per week online.

In 2024, The Herald gained recognition from its coverage of student protests against the war in Gaza. Much of the staff dedicated their days and nights to providing almost 16 hours per day of live coverage, according to the Herald.

== Comics ==
In 1976, when numerous newspapers nationally including the Madison Capital Times declined to run a series of Garry Trudeau's "Doonesbury" comic strips because of their controversial content, The Badger Herald negotiated with the syndicate and was the only paper regionally to print the cartoons.

The Badger Herald today publishes a comics page one day a week in its print edition. Long-running comics include White Bread & Toast (since at least 2004) and Rocky the Herald Comics Raccoon, about a witty, whiskey-swilling roustabout known for his sarcastic observations.
