= College Hill Alliance =

Organization in Macon, Georgia, USA

- Established: Fall 2009
- Location: 1083 Washington Ave, Macon, Georgia
- Funded by: John S. and James L. Knight Foundation
- Website: collegehillmacon.com

The mission of the College Hill Alliance is to assist the community in creating change to the physical and social fabric of the College Hill Corridor, a two-square mile area between Mercer University and Macon, Georgia's downtown business district. Funded by a three-year, $2 million grant from the John S. and James L. Knight Foundation, the College Hill Alliance is a department of Mercer University and became operational in the fall of 2009 after a Senior Capstone project for a group of graduating Mercer students developed into a comprehensive College Hill Corridor Master Plan.

== Background ==
In 2006, the John S. and James L. Knight Foundation sponsored a group of Mercer University students on a trip to meet Richard Florida of the Creative Class Group in Washington, D.C., to learn how they could spur the revival of Downtown Macon, Georgia. These students discovered that Macon was well positioned to recruit and grow creative service industries such as graphic design, marketing, and the arts by retaining talented young people graduating from the city's academic institutions. Inspired by this visit, the group of students dreamed a plan, entitled, "College Hill Revisited," to spur this growth by reconnecting Mercer University and Downtown Macon.

In spring 2007, Mercer University President Bill Underwood and Mayor C. Jack Ellis formed the College Hill Corridor Commission to accomplish the primary goal of creating an attractive, safe and well-defined corridor between Mercer and downtown. By summer, the newly formed Commission began holding public meetings to gather input and momentum from the local community to create a shared vision for the Corridor.

In March 2008, the Commission received a $250,000 planning grant from the Knight Foundation. With the community's input, Interface Studio, an urban planning and design firm based in Philadelphia, Pennsylvania, was hired to produce the College Hill Corridor Master Plan. During the next year, over 1,000 members of the community met to add their own ideas for the Corridor and set priorities.

In February 2009, the community-driven College Hill Corridor Master Plan was published and adopted by the Commission to begin putting into action.

In June 2009, the Knight Foundation awarded a $5 million grant for revitalizing the College Hill Corridor. The grant issued $3 million to the Community Foundation of Central Georgia to fund the Knight Neighborhood Challenge grant program and $2 million to Mercer University to create the College Hill Alliance.

In September 2012, the Knight Foundation awarded $2.3 million toward continuing the Alliance's work and expanding its influence to assist entrepreneurs in the area.

=== Alliance ===
The mission of the College Hill Alliance is to assist the community in creating positive change to the physical and social fabric of the College Hill Corridor, a two-square mile area between Mercer University and Macon, Georgia's downtown business district.

Created by a three-year, $2 million grant from the Knight Foundation, the College Hill Alliance is a department of Mercer University and became operational in the fall of 2009. In September 2012, the Knight Foundation awarded $2.3 million toward continuing the Alliance's work and expanding its influence to assist entrepreneurs in the area.

The full-time, corporate staff of the Alliance administers the implementation of the College Hill Corridor Master Plan and works specifically to foster neighborhood revitalization through business recruitment and retention, lifestyle enhancement, and by catalyzing commercial and residential real estate development that strengthens the historic character of College Hill.

=== Commission ===
The College Hill Corridor Commission is a diverse group of volunteers committed to promoting an improved physical, cultural and social connection between Downtown Macon and the historic neighborhoods surrounding Mercer University.

Formed in 2007, the Commission shepherded a process that culminated in the College Hill Corridor Master Plan, which represents the ideas of a design firm, local government officials, neighbors, students and visitors. Having attracted private funding to continue the College Hill initiative, the Commission now supports the College Hill Alliance in an advisory and volunteer capacity.

Commission members are named by virtue of their positions in stakeholder organizations within the Corridor and Downtown Macon and serve as advisors to the Knight Neighborhood Challenge as well as through task forces focused on priorities within the College Hill Corridor Master Plan. The co-chairs of the Commission, appointed by the Mayor of Macon and President of Mercer University, also sit on the College Hill Alliance Steering Committee.

All Commission meetings are open to the public and posted to the College Hill Events Calendar. Community feedback is welcomed and appreciated.

=== Corridor ===
The College Hill Corridor is a two-square mile area between Mercer University and Macon, Georgia's downtown business district comprising several historic city neighborhoods. What began as a Senior Capstone project for a group of graduating Mercer students developed into a comprehensive College Hill Corridor Master Plan, where public input was compiled to utilize the Corridor as a destination that improves the connection between Mercer University and Downtown Macon.

Today, the College Hill Corridor is a master plan in daily action. The revitalization of the Corridor continues thanks to the efforts of local residents and organizations, including the volunteer-driven College Hill Corridor Commission as well as the Knight Neighborhood Challenge and College Hill Alliance, which are both funded by the Knight Foundation.

=== Master plan ===
Developed by Philadelphia-based Interface Studio after numerous public meetings to gather community input, the original College Hill Corridor Master Plan concentrates on five areas that makes living in the Corridor like no other community in Macon.

New recommendations for the College Hill Corridor Master Plan, based on community input compiled over a series of public meetings in early 2014, were revealed at the Report to the Community 2014. Among the recommendations is the addition of two new themes: the Strong and the Biz. The Strong seeks to promote exercise, nutrition, access to healthy, affordable food and preventative care. The Biz is about job creation, fostering entrepreneurship and economic development. Other key recommendations were made to the original five parts of the Master Plan: the Basics, the Vibe, the Environment, the Connection and the Look. It was also recommended that the map of the College Hill Corridor extend to create a terminus at Riverside Cemetery and Rose Hill Cemetery.

== Projects ==
=== Neighborhood revitalization ===
The goal of the College Hill Corridor, located in these parameters, is to create a cultural and physical connection between Mercer University and downtown Macon. The Corridor tries to add economic value to the city's tax base, keep residential and commercial areas clean to attract and retain students and young professionals. The Corridor creates programs and events, such as Second Sunday, to bring the community together and promote local businesses, bands, fund raisers, and much more. Public input was compiled to utilize the Corridor as a destination that improves the connection between Mercer University and Downtown Macon. The Lights on Macon Tour and Sidewalk Stories are several of the initiatives taking place in The Corridor to boost the local economy and improve the quality of the town.

College Hill Alliance works with the Historic Macon Foundation and Beall's Neighborhood Association to promote living in the Corridor. There are homes to fit every lifestyle and budget, from $60,000 rehabbed loft-style shotgun houses to fully restored $1 million mansions, all in the same block.

=== Knight neighborhood challenge ===
When the John S. and James L. Knight Foundation awarded $5 million to the revitalization of the College Hill Corridor, $3 million was set aside for the Knight Neighborhood Challenge. Administered by the Community Foundation of Central Georgia, the Knight Neighborhood Challenge is a five-year program that underwrites ideas to transform the city of Macon's first neighborhoods into the vision of the College Hill Corridor Master Plan. A broad-based, competitive grant program, the Challenge funds projects that spruce up parks and public spaces in The Corridor. It also funds enhancements of the arts and entertainment scene. The effort aims to get people involved in College Hill through an array of civic and cultural projects. The goal of the Knight Neighborhood Challenge is to invest in ideas to restore the land use and social fabric of the College Hill neighborhood, to give the city an opportunity to actively participate in a wide array of community arts, cultural and sports activities, and to connect through digital and traditional information gathering/sharing channels.

=== Second Sunday ===
Second Sunday Concerts are one of College Hill Corridor's signature events. Every second Sunday of the month, from April through October, the Corridor hosts the city's biggest monthly picnic in Macon, featuring live music in Washington Park from 6 - 8pm. The concerts are free to attend and features a cash bar, food vendors, and the Macon Makers.

=== Magnolia Street soapbox derby ===
For the past 6 years, the Magnolia Street Soapbox Derby is hosted by the Magnolia Street residents and takes place the Saturday before the Second Sunday concert in April. The timed racing event takes place on Magnolia Street’s hill and has teams compete for the title of fastest car and most creative structure. Local business sponsor this annual event. The event is free to attend but a registration fee is required for participants.

=== Sundown screen series ===
The College Hill Alliance's need for the creation of sustainable events is being met by different public and private entities. Big Screen on the Green was one of the original Corridor events. Now, the event has transformed into the Sundown Screen Series.

The Series brings the silver screen to the outdoors and is hosted by Macon-Bibb Parks & Recreation. These outdoor movie events take place in spring, summer and fall at various parks in the city and the Corridor.

=== Reunion zero ===
The Alliance and Mercer University's Alumni Services department partnered together to celebrate the graduating seniors of Mercer University. The communities of Mercer and Macon come together during the week immediately following the last week of the academic calendar to throw a celebration. The week features concerts, downtown get-arounds, specials and discounts at businesses, tours, information about Macon, and career guidance from young alumni. During the week, connections form between the young alumni, Macon community, and recent graduates.

=== Campus Macon ===
Currently in the development stage, the College Hill Alliance is actively exploring ideas to connect local college students to internship and job opportunities in central Georgia. The project is scheduled for completion in late 2014.

=== The next big idea ===
The College Hill Alliance encourages the entrepreneurial spirit among residents of central Georgia. Following that mindset, a business plan competition was created. The Next Big Idea was designed to encourage students in the Central Georgia region to make their business dreams a reality, was created. All students at the following colleges were eligible to apply: Central Georgia Technical College, Fort Valley State University, Georgia College, Mercer University, Middle Georgia State College, & Wesleyan College.

Teams submitted their ideas online and each school choose up to two semi-finalist teams. At the end, they competed by pitching their idea to a panel of judges. Teams were judged in the following areas: risk, strategy, capability, viability, and impact. $15,000 was given away as prize money to the top three teams.

=== Macon makers ===
The College Hill Alliance launched an open call for people to join the "Maker Movement" – a growing national network of artists, craftspeople, business owners, entrepreneurs and innovators building new, locally-driven economies. The Maker Movement is the approximately 135 million adults – 57 percent of the American population ages 18 and up – who employ their creative skills in craft activities, such as making clothing, jewelry, baked goods or art. Financial estimates show that these “makers” push $29 billion into the economy each year. Examples of makers range from computer programmers to wood workers and run the gamut of arts and crafts to engineering and technology.

The College Hill Alliance is seeking Macon Makers as part of its expanded focus to boost entrepreneurship and attract homegrown businesses to Macon’s Downtown and College Hill Corridor.
