= Pensacola State College =

Public college in Pensacola, Florida, US

- Former name: Pensacola Junior College (1948–2010)
- Motto: Latin: Ab hinc orbis
- Motto in English: "From here, the world"
- Type: Public college
- Established: 1948; 78 years ago
- Parent institution: Florida College System
- Accreditation: SACS
- Endowment: $11.8 million (2024)
- Budget: $85.5 million (2024)
- President: C. Edward Meadows
- Faculty: 147 (full-time); 235 (part-time)
- Undergraduates: 7,981 (fall 2022)
- Location: Pensacola, Florida, United States; 30.4810°N 87.2014°W
- Campus: Small city
- Newspaper: The Corsair
- Colors: Green and navy
- Nickname: Pirates
- Sporting affiliations: NJCAA Region 8 – Panhandle Conference
- Website: www.pensacolastate.edu

Pensacola State College (PSC) is a public college in Pensacola, Florida, United States. It is part of the Florida College System. Originally established as Pensacola Junior College in 1948, the college underwent a name change in July 2010 to reflect its expanded academic offerings to include both associate and bachelor's degrees.

== Campuses ==
Pensacola State College was the first higher education institution founded in 1948 in Pensacola. The college expanded its offerings over the decades with the establishment of additional campuses, including: the Downtown campus (opened in 1957), the Milton campus (opened in 1971), and the Warrington campus (opened in 1977). The former "mini-campus" at Naval Air Station Pensacola, which opened in 1981, was destroyed in 2004 by Hurricane Ivan. PSC also operates centers in Santa Rosa County and Century.

== Academics ==
Pensacola State College offers associate and bachelor's degrees, vocational certifications, and an adult high school. With over 170 individual programs, PSC focuses on career advancement and technical training.

== Partnerships ==
Pensacola State College maintains a strong partnership with the University of West Florida through joint initiatives and collaborative programs. PSC also has a partnership with the University of Florida via a shared campus in Milton.

== Media ==
The main PBS station of Pensacola, WSRE, is operated by Pensacola State College. PSC also publishes The Corsair, the student newspaper, published both in print and online. It covers a range of topics including campus events, student profiles, and sports. The paper is known for its awards and regular publication schedule.

== Athletics ==
Pensacola State College's athletic teams compete in the Panhandle Conference of the Florida College System Activities Association, part of Region 8 of the National Junior College Athletic Association. The college supports various sports, including basketball, softball, baseball, and cross country running.

== Notable alumni ==
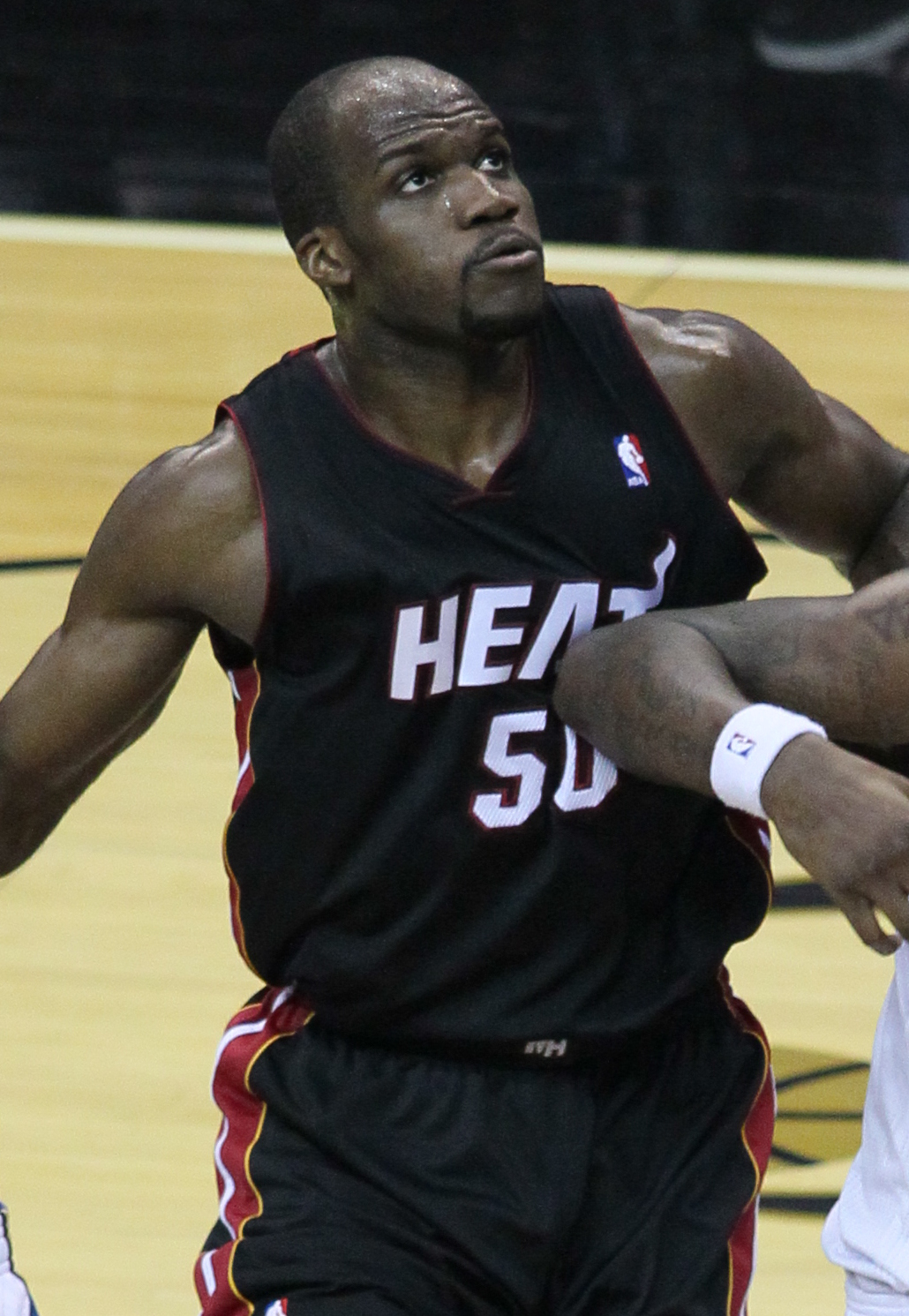
Joel Anthony

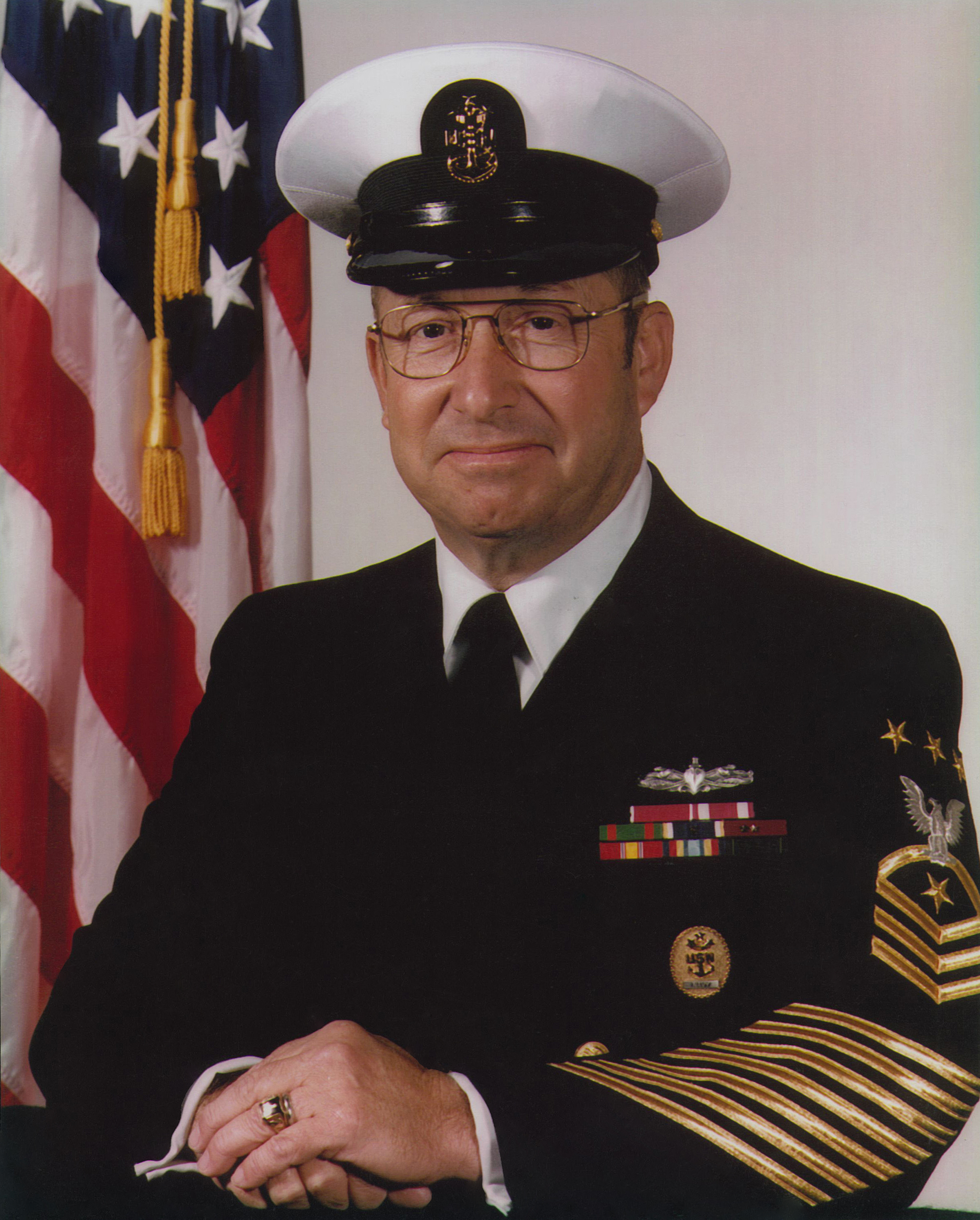
William H. Plackett

Craig Waters

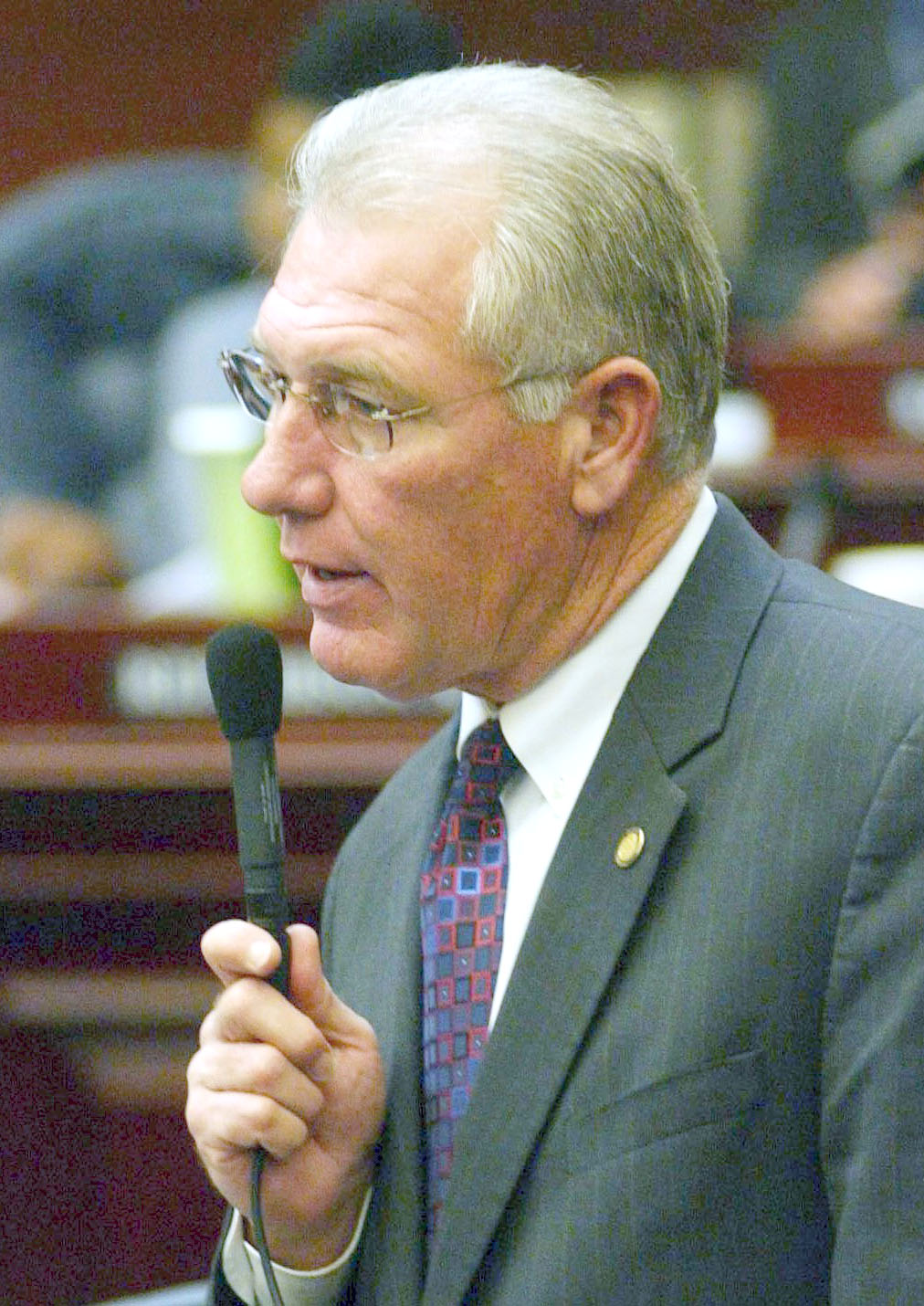
Greg Evers

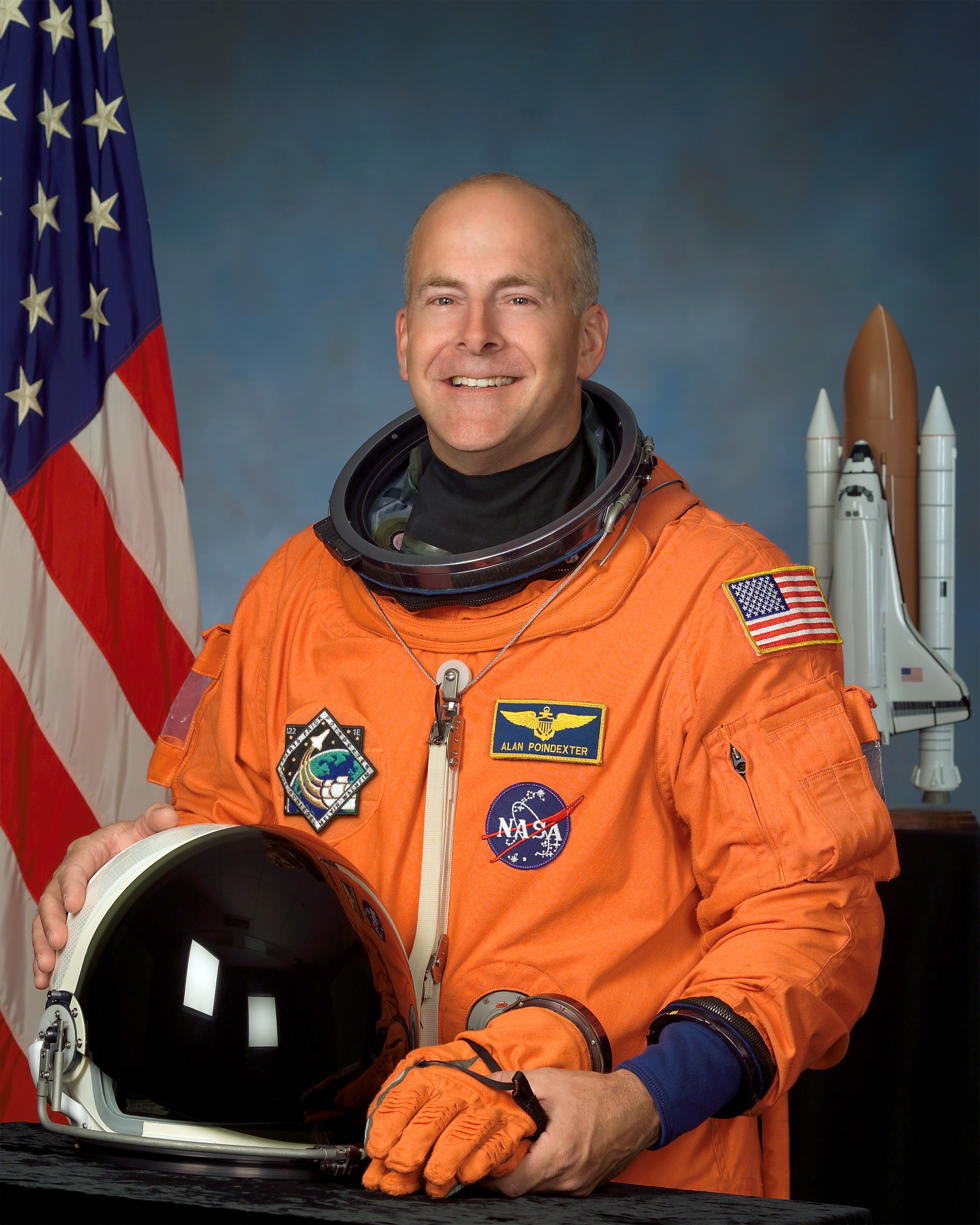
Alan G. Poindexter
- Joel Anthony, professional basketball player
- Joe Cannon, professional baseball player
- Greg Evers, member of the Florida Senate
- Jerry Maygarden, member of the Florida House of Representatives
- Dave Murzin, member of the Florida House of Representatives
- Craig Waters, communications counsel for the Florida Supreme Court
- William H. Plackett, Master Chief Petty Officer of the Navy
- Alan G. Poindexter, American naval officer and NASA astronaut
- Billy Sadler, professional baseball player

== See also ==
- Escambia Amateur Astronomers Association
- Florida College System
