= The Michigan Review =

- Type: Student newspaper
- Format: Online
- School: University of Michigan
- Owner(s): Independent, supported by the University of Michigan and by the Collegiate Network
- Founder(s): Thomas Fous and Ronald J. Stefanski
- Publisher: Self-Published
- President: Wade Vellky; Robert Gioia
- Founded: December 1982
- Political alignment: Moderate
- Language: English
- Headquarters: Ann Arbor, Michigan
- City: Ann Arbor
- Country: United States
- Sister newspapers: The Dartmouth Review, The Stanford Review, The Irish Rover (Notre Dame)
- OCLC number: 21114760
- Website: www.michiganreview.com

The Michigan Review is a news publication in Ann Arbor, Michigan. The Review, published biweekly, is funded primarily by grants from the Collegiate Network, donations, and by advertising revenue.

== History ==
The Review was founded by Thomas Fous and Ronald J. Stefanski, in response to an editorial in The Michigan Daily attacking Fous, who was then the chairman of the university's College Republicans. Fous consulted with editors of The Dartmouth Review, as well as Detroit News writer Alan Miller to help direct the formation of the paper. The nascent group secured 501(c)(3) status for The Review, and empaneled an honorary advisory board, which included Paul W. McCracken, Russell Kirk, Irving Kristol, and R. Emmett Tyrrell.

In late November 1982, the first issue of The Review debuted on the campus of the University of Michigan, as well as on campuses across the state of Michigan. The issue's founding editorial, entitled "In Response to Needs and Demands," laid out the history and mission of The Review. A copy of this editorial was reprinted in the April 16, 2007, issue.

Since its founding issue, The Review has gone through numerous incarnations, from a long-form magazine format, to an opinion journal format, to more traditional newspaper format. The current publication resembles a more traditional newspaper format than anything else. Though its paper size is that of a tabloid, its content and presentation is more traditional than stereotypical tabloids, which tend to sensationalize stories.

The Review has gained national attention during its history. It was an important voice on campus against the University of Michigan's speech code, which was eventually struck down as unconstitutional by federal courts. Additionally, The Review has long been engaged in a fight against U-M's use of affirmative action policies in its admissions processes. Its work on this issue has brought the journal national press exposure, including interviews on national and international news, as well as numerous articles by Review editors published in national outlets, like the National Review, the Christian Science Monitor, and The American Spectator. The Review also played an important role in its coverage of the Michigan Civil Rights Initiative, a ballot initiative passed in 2006 that bans the use of racial and gender preferences in the state of Michigan.

Review alumni have achieved some measure of success in the national arena, working for such media outlets as the National Review, The Weekly Standard, The American Spectator, The Hill, and Investor's Business Daily, and writing speeches for President George W. Bush.

== See also ==
- The Mendota Beacon
