= The Corsair (Pensacola State College newspaper) =

Student newspaper in Florida

- Type: Student newspaper
- Editor-in-chief: Quincy Kirn
- Founded: February 2, 1949; 77 years ago
- Headquarters: Room 410-A, Building 4, Pensacola Campus
- Circulation: ~2,000 (as of February 2021)
- Sister newspapers: The Kilgore Review (Literary Magazine)
- Website: ecorsair.pensacolastate.edu

The Corsair is the print and online student newspaper of Pensacola State College. The paper is circulated across campuses of Pensacola State College and is published monthly during the primary school year and once during the summer term. The paper primarily focuses on special events or occurrences involving its constituent college, in addition to student profiles, arts reports, editorials, and Pensacola State College sports reports. Interviews, while mainly focusing on students and faculty of the college, have also included local celebrities and politicians, including Congressional candidates.

== History and operations ==
The paper has been was first published February 2, 1949; its first issue was titled, You Name It, then changing the name of its second issue to the Beachcomber. This name continued to be used until the 1960s, when it was renamed The Corsair.

The paper temporarily went exclusively online during the height of the COVID-19 pandemic, the first time it had done so. The paper returned to its hybrid online/in-print format at the beginning of the Spring 2021 semester.

The paper is written completely by students of the college, directed by a faculty advisor and assisted by a layout editor. As of the February 2022 issue, The Corsair has 5 staff writers, along with Layout Editor Sebastian Gordon and Copy Editor Crystal Duc. As of July 2025, the paper is currently managed by Editor-in-Chief Arren Joseph-White and guided by faculty advisor Marisa Mills. The periodical is commonly staffed by members of the college's journalism program, as a portion of their overall academic plan.

Previous administrations of the paper had received attention in regards to the defense of free speech and a free press. In one incident, this was due to the paper reporting on a schism between certain faculty and the then college president, despite certain warnings from faculty at the time. In another, the paper's reporting on alleged censorship and aggression against student publications by the college administration brought controversy. The Corsair made news nationally through the Associated Press in 1991 when, as part of an editorial on the prevention of sexually transmitted diseases and unwanted pregnancies, the paper gave out birth control devices in their individual issues.

In addition, The Corsair has had photographs included in The New York Times, has had writings and editorials quoted or cited by published books, and has had former writers and editors write for nationwide papers, such as USA Today.

== Associations ==
The Corsair, along with the Pensacola State College literary magazine, The Kilgore Review, are members of the statewide organizations, the Florida College System Publications Association and the Florida College Activities Association. These organizations aid to link together various student newspapers and other extracurricular activity programs throughout the Florida College System (this however is distinct from the State University System of Florida).

== Awards and honors ==
The paper and its staff have won several local, statewide, and national awards for excellence in journalism and design. This includes multiple national awards regarding "excellence and outstanding achievement" in the operations of the paper's website, eCorsair. The Corsair consistently rates among the top student newspapers among Florida colleges by number of awards earned through the Florida College Activities Association. Through this and other organizations, The Corsair has earned 14 and 13 awards in 2018 and 2017 respectively, as well as several more in previous years.
