= F. Grant Gilmore =

20th Century American author

F. Grant Gilmore was a playwright, author, and producer in the United States.

He corresponded with Crisis magazine in 1929 about publishing one of his stories. W. E. B. Du Bois wrote back that the publication could not "handle" the story. He worked at the Rochester Sentinel, was a barber, and was involved in Prince Hall Freemasonry in Rochester, New York. He and his work are discussed in Jennifer James' 2007 study of African American war literature A Freedom Bought with Blood.

The Library of Congress has images from his novel The Problem about an African American Sergeant serving in the Spanish–American War including a photo of Gilmore in the book.

== Writings ==
- Masonic and other Poems (1908)
- The Problem, a Military Novel (1915)
