= Vanderbilt Orbis =

- Categories: Investigative journalism
- Founded: 2001; 24 years ago
- Country: United States
- Based in: Nashville, Tennessee
- Language: English

The Orbis is a student-produced publication at Vanderbilt University in Nashville, Tennessee, which provides an outlet for a broad array of progressive, left-wing and minority voices on campus. In addition, Orbis is well known for investigative work that frequently covers topics overlooked or underreported in other campus media.

== History ==
Orbis was founded in 2001 by a group of Vanderbilt students who were motivated by what they perceived as surprisingly large and enthusiastic support on campus for Al Gore's presidential campaign, at what was widely perceived to be a conservative campus. Those students hoped to create an outlet for progressive and left-leaning views, and engaging progressive students in a common forum that would demonstrate the depth of progressive viewpoints on campus. They also hoped to foster an environment that would be more open to Vanderbilt's increasingly diverse student body.

Originally, Orbis was a bi-weekly publication, printed in a newspaper format. The articles focused on both national, local and campus issues, ranging from the September 11 terrorist attacks and citywide elections, to arts and entertainment, to issues affecting LGBT students and different ethnic and religious minority groups on campus. Orbis is managed and distributed on the campus of Vanderbilt University, but it is financially independent from the university's administration in important respects. Orbis is one of several publications supported by Vanderbilt Student Communications, a non-profit corporation which funds student-produced media on Vanderbilt's campus.

Beginning in 2005, Orbis underwent a series of major changes, including a re-vamp of the layout, moving to tabloid-size format, and longer issues. Orbis continues to adhere to this paradigm today. Issues typically consist of in-depth commentary pieces, investigative reporting on university politics (such as an April 2008 feature about the high number of rapes on Vanderbilt's campus), as well as reviews of films, books, and music from a progressive perspective. The staff of Orbis has also made a point since 2005 of making coverage of student movements (such as Vanderbilt's movement for a living wage) an important part of its content. Issues are released monthly throughout the academic year, resulting in the publication of eight issues per year. Orbis' current tagline is "Vanderbilt's Progressive Voice".

As of the 2013–2014 academic year, the paper took a hiatus from publication. In 2015, the paper resumed publication with an emphasis on environmental and investigative journalism.

== Recognition ==
In 2003, The Nation named Orbis one of "Ten Papers We Like."

In 2006, after undergoing significant changes in style, layout, and content, Orbis was named "Breakthrough Publication of the Year" by Campus Progress, a division of the Center for American Progress.
