= The Sentinel (Rockhurst University) =

The Rockhurst Sentinel
- "A tradition since 1917"
- Type: Student newspaper
- School: Rockhurst University
- Editor: Brian Roewe
- Founded: 1914; 111 years ago
- Headquarters: Kansas City, Missouri
- Website: rusentinel.com

The Rockhurst Sentinel (or The Sentinel) is the official student newspaper of Rockhurst University in Kansas City, Missouri. The Sentinel has been published at Rockhurst since 1917. For a brief period during the 1990s, The Sentinel was called The Hawk before it changed its name back to The Sentinel in 2001.

The Editorial staff is run by the students of Rockhurst. Although there is a faculty adviser, the students make all decisions regarding the content and direction of the paper. The Sentinel focuses heavily on events around the Rockhurst campus. The content is specifically geared towards the student body and usually includes campus news, commentary, features, and humor pieces. Two of the more popular features among the students are the Security Report and "Mockhurst," which depicts student life through characters based on the university mascot, the Hawk.

Mockhurst was created by then editor Matt Nickson and staff contributor Sal Avitia. The strip gained attention from students, as well as administrators, in the wake of unpopular restrictions often mocked in the strip; including the use of hot tubs on campus and alcohol usage by student residents 21 and over. The strip used characters such as Dr.Mark Slow, representing Dr. Matt Quick and Ms. Kate Wolf, representing director of housing, Ms. Kim Bear.

The Sentinel is published around every two weeks in print and online . Some more recent editions of The Sentinel can be found online in the archives.
