= List of county roads in Citrus County, Florida =

- County road shields used in Florida

Highway names
- Interstates: Interstate X (I-X)
- US Highways: U.S. Highway X (US X)
- State: State Road X (SR X)
- County: County Road X (CR X)

System links
- County roads in Florida; County roads in Citrus County

The following is a list of county roads in Citrus County, Florida. All county roads are maintained by the county in which they reside.

== County Road 39 ==
County Road 39
- Location: Southeastern and Northern Citrus County

County Road 39 is a tri-county continuation of the former SR 39 in Citrus County, however the designation exists in two sections; One in southeastern Citrus, and another in northern Citrus County.

The first section of County Road 39 enters Pineola from Istachatta at the Hernando-Citrus County Line, where it resumes its designation as County Road 39 from County Road 439 (Hernando County, Florida). The road is named South Istachatta Road and it winds along the Withlacoochee State Trail, but eventually the trail moves to the northwest. After running across Bradley Lake, it finally terminates at County Road 48. The journey of former SR 39 does not end there though, as it secretly overlaps westbound along CR 48 towards Floral City. North of Floral City, former SR 39 runs along Old Floral City Avenue, where it runs along the Withlacoochee State Trail past County Road 39A (see below), and Fort Cooper State Park, before entering Inverness.

The second section exists between State Road 200 in Stoke's Ferry and US 41 south of Citrus Springs, County Road 39 winds along the south side of the Withlacoochee River as the Withlacoochee Trail which is not to be confused with the Withlacoochee State Trail.

=== County Road 39A ===
East Gobbler Drive
- Location: North of Floral City

County Road 39A, is a suffixed alternate of CR 39. It runs west to east from US 41 north of Floral City, where it crosses the Withlacoochee State Trail, then former County Road 39 (Old Floral City Avenue) before finally ending within the Withlapopka Islands. Just as CR 39 was a former segment of SR 39, CR 39A was formerly designated as SR 39A.

== County Road 44W ==
West Fort Island Trail
- Location: Fort Island-Crystal River

County Road 44 (often marked as County Road 44W) exists as the western tip of old Florida State Road 44 south of "downtown" Crystal River. The suffix, "W", was most likely added to not confuse this section with State Road 44, to the north, and to show its location by being west of US 19 and US 98(SR 55). As with the majority of these types of 'coastal spur' routes, in West Central Florida, it is county maintained.

== County Road 48 ==
County Road 48
- Location: Floral City-East of Floral City

County Road 48 is a former segment of Florida State Road 48. It runs from US 41 in Floral City. Within Floral City itself, it is called East Orange Avenue, and passes through the Floral City Historic District, while east of the city it is known as East Bushnell Road. The road runs through the farmlands and wooded wetlands of southeastern Citrus County before approaching the bridge over Withlacoochee River where it continues as Sumter County Road 48 winding through southwestern Sumter County through Wahoo, later passing through Bushnell, then heads toward Center Hill and Howey-in-the Hills.

== County Road 470 ==
County Road 470
- Location: Inverness-East of Inverness.

County Road 470 runs along North Apopka Avenue and East Gospel Island Trail in Inverness and points east. It runs east and west from US 41–SR 44 in Inverness into SR 44 east of the Inverness city limits. The route was formerly designated as SR 470. Though another CR 470 exists in nearby Sumter County, little evidence of a connection between the two roads exists.

=== Route description ===
Citrus County Road 470 begins on North Apopka Avenue at US 41-SR 44 across from South Apopka Avenue and around the southeast and northeast corners of the historic Old Citrus County Courthouse. Almost immediately after the old courthouse it runs past the existing Citrus County Courthouse, as well as other municipal buildings, then the former Seaboard Air Line Railroad station that's now a law office, and the former Atlantic Coast Line Railroad station that's a closed former station restaurant on the southeast corner of the grade crossing of the Withlacoochee State Trail. On the southwest corner of the trail crossing is a local road leading to the Inverness Trailhead, and a bicycle shop that rents bikes for trail users and other customers. The northwest and northeast corners of the trail crossing is strictly city parkland.

Before North Apopka Avenue continues to the boat ramp named for the street, CR 470 leaves to the northeast at East Vine Street, and eventually turns onto East Gospel Island Trail, where it immediately crosses the Franklin Hair Bridge to reach the island the road was named after. Most of the surroundings are either residential or wetlands, with the occasional bed and breakfast. From South Gospel Oaks Terrace and East Allen Drive to East Oak Isle Drive, the road curves from northeast to north then curves around Fred's Lake, and turns east again.

The route doesn't leave the island until the bridge east of North Shadow Wood Drive, and then curves slightly to the northeast. Here the road passes neighborhoods such as Harbor Point and dips before approaching Barnette Estates, just before encountering a wye intersection with South Sunset Terrace, the first entrance to the Point O' Woods Community. After curving to the southeast, two nearly identical gateways can be found at both ends of East Crescent Drive which has the Point O' Woods Clubhouse between the two ends. A left-turn lane for South Golf Harbor Path can be found as the road turns south, because this road leads to "The Moorings at Point O' Woods" community, and the Point O' Woods Golf Course.

After this turn the road encounters parallel intersections with East Southgate Drive and East Peachtree Lane, and after this on the opposite side, the intersection with East Goldfinch Lane in the Twin Lakes neighborhood. After two more dead end streets to the east, Citrus County Road 470 curves around one more lake and passes three more side streets before it ends at SR 44 next to a Speedway gas station and convenience store previously used by Hess, somewhere east of Inverness.

== County Road 480 ==
County Road 480
- Location: Chassahowitzka-South of Floral City

County Road 480 runs through five roads in southern Citrus County. It runs east and west from the Chassahowitzka River in Chassahowitzka into Withlacoochee State Forest, to US 41 south of Floral City. The road was previously signed as SR 480. Though another CR 480 exists in nearby Hernando County, Citrus CR 480 has no connection to that route.

=== Route description ===
Citrus County Road 480 officially begins at the Chassahowitzka River County Park Boat Ramp along the south side of the river at the western end of West Miss Maggie Drive. It runs from north to south and then turns north again at South McClung Loop which runs south, and Simril Court, which runs east into Betty Long's Campground. West Miss Maggie Drive curves back to the northeast one block later, and follows the southern shores of the Chassahowitzka River wetlands. 0.1 of a mile east of West Lykes Trail, the road makes a slight curve to the left, but still continues to run northeast and southwest. West Miss Maggie Drive ends at the southern terminus of the overlap between US 19–98, but US 98 briefly overlaps CR 480 along West Ponce De Leon Drive (formerly West Lecanto Highway), before it branches off to the northeast at West Oak Park Boulevard, while US 98 runs southeast towards Brooksville, Lakeland, and Palm Beach. The road curves to the right at a former segment of the road, now named West Oak Park Lane, which leads to the back of a shopping center today. From here, CR 480 runs through southern segments of Sugarmill Woods curving slightly to the northeast and then to the southeast. After the intersection of Oak Village Boulevard and Cypress Boulevard East, the route runs under a medium-width power line right-of-way along South Richtop Terrace and a fire house on the southeast corner of that right-of-way. Later it runs along the southern edge of the Southern Woods Golf Club before encountering a much wider power line right-of-way, then enters the Citrus Tract of the Withlacoochee State Forest, part of which will include a bridge for the Suncoast Parkway with no access. Along the way, the road makes sharper curves towards the southeast. Leaving the forest, the road is surrounded by some local ranchland, and after running over a cattle trail tunnel, begins to curve straight east as it passes the Meadow Run Estate. CR 480 skirts the southern border of Oak Grove where it intersects CR 491 and the street name changes to West Stage Coach Trail, and re-enters the Citrus Tract of the Withlacoochee State Forest. Briefly, however some private farmland can be found on the north side of the CR 480, before it enters the thick of the forest.

Around the vicinity of South Brittle Road, West Stage Coach Trail becomes East Stage Coach Trail, and runs through the ghost town of Stage Pond where it passes by the surviving Stage Pond Cemetery. The road curves to the southeast as it leaves the forest again and curves straight east as it passes through more local ranch land. It then descends into the woods, but climbs another hill between South Portage Point, and South Old Jones Road, before going downhill once again. Between South Running Deer Point and South Storrey Mine Road, the road runs through a former Seaboard Air Line Railroad line between Brooksville and Inverness, which can be spotted when the pavement fades and markings for the former crossing are exposed within the pavement. County Road 480 has a brief concurrency with County Road 581 (South Pleasant Grove Road), and then East Stage Coach Trail branches off to the northeast, although aerial views suggest a former alignment of this segment continuing southwest toward the section west of CR 581. With some exceptions, the road is primarily flanked by ranchland on the north side, and wooded areas on the south side with both public and private dead end streets, and large radio tower on the southeast side. Some ranchland opens up on the southeast side as the road briefly runs straight east and west for the last time, and more forestland is found on the north, eventually moving on both sides. The road curves slightly to the right at the intersection of South Meredith Avenue, and then curves back to the northeast before it approaches South Zanmar Drive. After crossing one last power line, County Road 480 ends at US 41 south of Floral City, with turning ramps on the northwest and southwest corners of the intersection.

== County Road 482 ==
West Cardinal Street
- Location: Homosassa-South of Mannfield

County Road 482 runs exclusively along West Cardinal Street from US 19/98 in Homosassa to Citrus CR 491 (Lecanto Highway) near the site of the ghost town of Mannfield. It was designated during the construction of the Suncoast Parkway Extension.

== County Road 486 ==
Norvell Bryant Highway
- Location: East of Crystal River-Hernando

County Road 486 runs entirely along West Norvell Bryant Highway. It runs west to east from SR 44 east of Crystal River into US 41 in Hernando, just south of the southern terminus of SR 200. The route was once former SR 486. County Road 486 is four lanes wide, and almost entirely a divided highway, that is flanked by a parallel bicycle path on the south side.

=== Route description ===
Citrus County Road 486 begins at SR 44 across from the intersection of North Dunkenfield Avenue. The road passes by some local residencies and businesses until it reaches a moderately wide power Line Right-of-Way, and then the western terminus of West Pine Ridge Boulevard, the western gateway to Pine Ridge. The opposite side of the road is a large ranch field. Somewhere within this vicinity is the proposed right of way for the Citrus County extension of the Suncoast Parkway which will have no interchanges with CR 486 once it is constructed. The first street that passes for a major intersection along CR 486 in County Road 491 (Lecanto Highway). After this, the road briefly climbs a hill until it reaches North Crooked Branch Drive. Between the Oak Hill Estates and Timberline Estates neighborhoods, CR 486 makes a slight northeast reverse curve before entering Citrus Hills where it encounters the intersection with North Forest Ridge Boulevard and North Terra Vista Boulevard, the former of which is the southern gateway to Beverly Hills, and the latter of which leads to the Terra Vista neighborhood. Along the way, the road passes the Heritage Oaks neighborhood, and then at North Essex Avenue, West Norvell Bryant Highway becomes East Norvell Bryant Highway. The first intersection along East Norvell Bryant Highway is the gateway to The Villages of Citrus Hills, but only after passing a nearby hotel on the south side of the road.

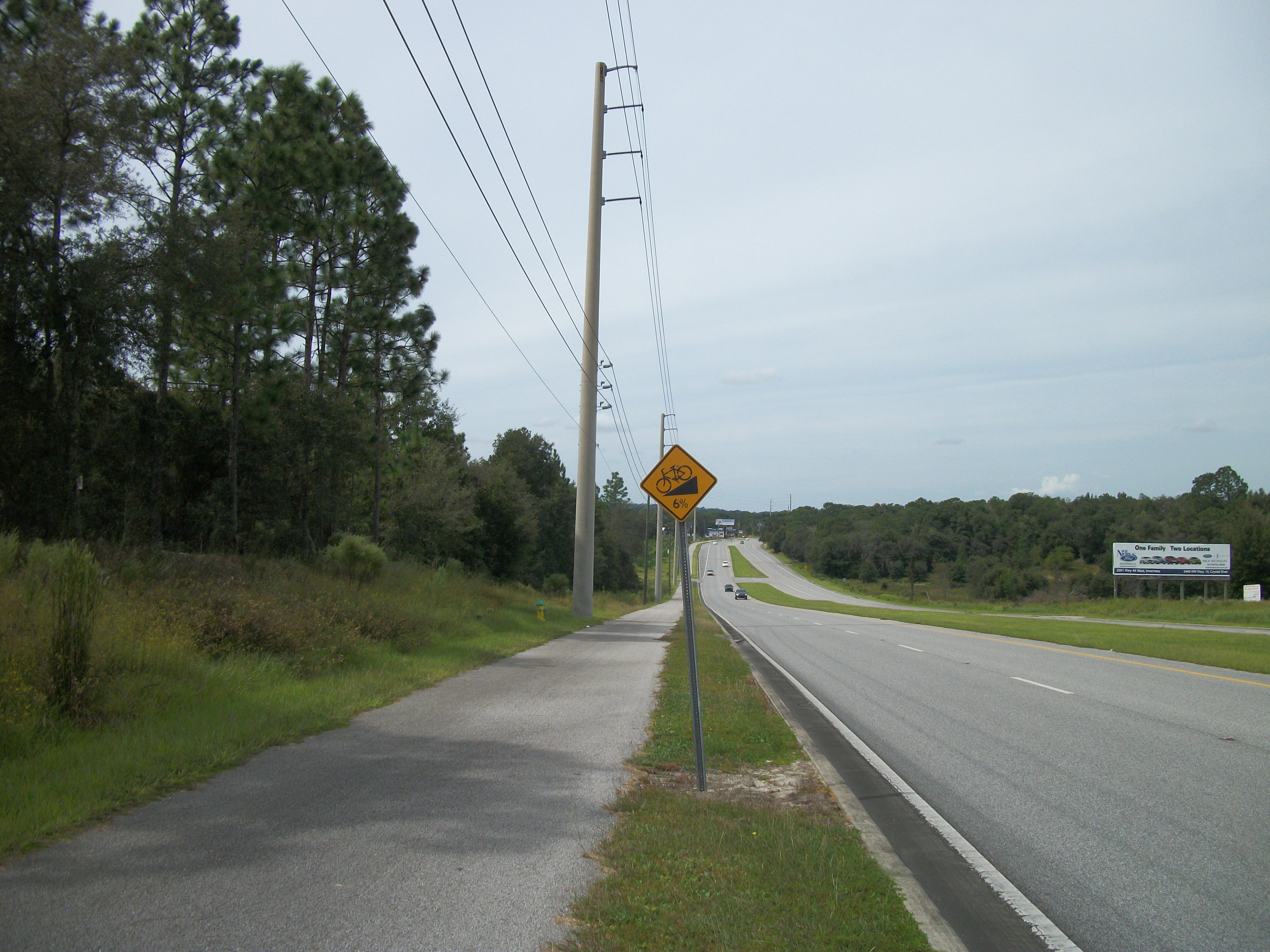
A westbound warning sign about the 6% downgrade for the parallel bicycle lane.

The divider ends momentarily at North Annapolis Avenue, and at North Trucks Avenue the road makes a slight reverse curve to the south and then east, which ends at some farmland where the divider begins again, and a steep climb is in store for the bike path that ends at Thatcher Terrace. At some point it enters Hernando, where it crosses a small power line right-of-way before the intersection with the northern terminus of North Croft Avenue and then has another intersection with the driveway to Hernando Elementary School Later it also by the former home of the Ted Williams Museum. At the intersection of North Railroad Way, the route crosses the Withlacoochee State Trail, which was realigned one block west when CR 486 was being widened to four lanes, and overlaps the bike path along the south side of the route. It also includes a trailhead on the north side east of Railroad Avenue. Citrus County Road 486 and East Norvell Bryant Highway both end at US 41, however the same intersection continues as a local road named East Parsons Point Road which becomes a dirt road east of North Wheaton Point Drive, and ends at another dirt road named North Reba Path, which is a dead end street in both directions.

== County Road 488 ==
West Dunnellon Road
- Location: Red Level-Citrus Springs

County Road 488 runs entirely along West Dunnellon Road in northern Citrus County. It runs west to east from US 19–98 in Red Level northeast to US 41 in Citrus Springs. The route was former designated as SR 488.

== County Road 490 ==
County Road 490
- Location: Homosassa-Lecanto

County Road 490 runs through southwestern Citrus County. It runs west to east from the Homosassa River in Homosassa to SR 44 in Lecanto west of CR 491. The road was formerly designated as SR 490, and contains a hidden overlap with US 19–98.

=== Route description ===
County Road 490 officially begins at the Duncan J. McRae Public Boat Ramp along the Homossassa River at the northwest end of South Cherokee Way. At the Homosassa Elementary School, the route shifts to West Yulee Drive and runs east, as it is intended to. Along this segment the route runs through "downtown" Homosassa. Briefly curving to the north at West Central Street and then northeast, it passes through the Yulee Sugar Mill Ruins Historic State Park. The road almost continues to the northeast along West Fishbowl Drive, but then moves to the east again, and curves through the woodlands centered around the sugar mill.

Taking a northeast turn, it branches off to the left at West Bradshaw Street, which curves to the southeast ending at US 19–98 (Suncoast Boulevard). West Yulee Drive also ends at US 19–98, but CR 490 joins the two US routes in a northbound overlap. US 19/98/CR 490 passes by the Homosassa Springs Wildlife State Park, and then encounters an intersection with both CR 490A (See below), and West Grover Cleveland Boulevard. Two blocks later, the route branches off on its own again at West Homosassa Trail, which begins west of the intersection at a dead end street between a pair of shopping centers.

As West Homossassa Trial CR 490 runs straight east for two blocks and then turns northeast as it winds around a local park, then a Citrus County Firehouse, and then between another park and a Lions Club meeting hall before turning northeast again. This segment is generally rural with random residencies and local businesses lining the road, which curves east just before the intersection with a dirt road named North MacArthur Terrace, and maintains the same sporadic houses and businesses as before. The road curves northeast again and climbs a hill as it intersects South Coleman Avenue while doing so. From there it remains entirely undeveloped until it reaches a signalized intersection with South Rock Crusher Road.

Aside from entrances to trailer parks and deed restricted communities, most of the structures along this often hilly segment of CR 490 consist of local businesses, billboards, and churches. Otherwise the land is strictly barren forest. East of South Gleneagle Terrace is an eastbound driveway to a power substation, and then a power line right-of-way running directly north and south, which is also next to the right-of-way for a future extension of the Suncoast Parkway. A much wider power line right-of-way can be found further east, and after this an ambulance garage for the Nature Coast EMS. Citrus County Road 490 finally ends at SR 44 in Lecanto at a point along that route where it runs from southeast to east.

=== County Road 490A ===
West Halls River Road
- Location: Homosassa-Homosassa Springs

County Road 490A is a suffixed alternate route of CR 490. It runs west to east as West Halls River Road from the Homosassa River in Homosassa to US 19–98–CR 490 in Homosassa Springs. The route was formerly designated as SR 490A. East of US 19-98 the road continues as Grover Cleveland Boulevard and runs to CR 491 in Lecanto.

== County Road 491 ==
Lecanto Highway
- Location: Oak Grove-Stoke's Ferry

County Road 491 is Lecanto Highway, a bi-county south to north road that begins at the Hernando-Citrus County Line in Oak Grove near the Withlacoochee State Forest, and ends at SR 200 in Stoke's Ferry, just south of the intersection with the northern segment of CR 39. It was formerly designated as SR 491.

=== Route description ===
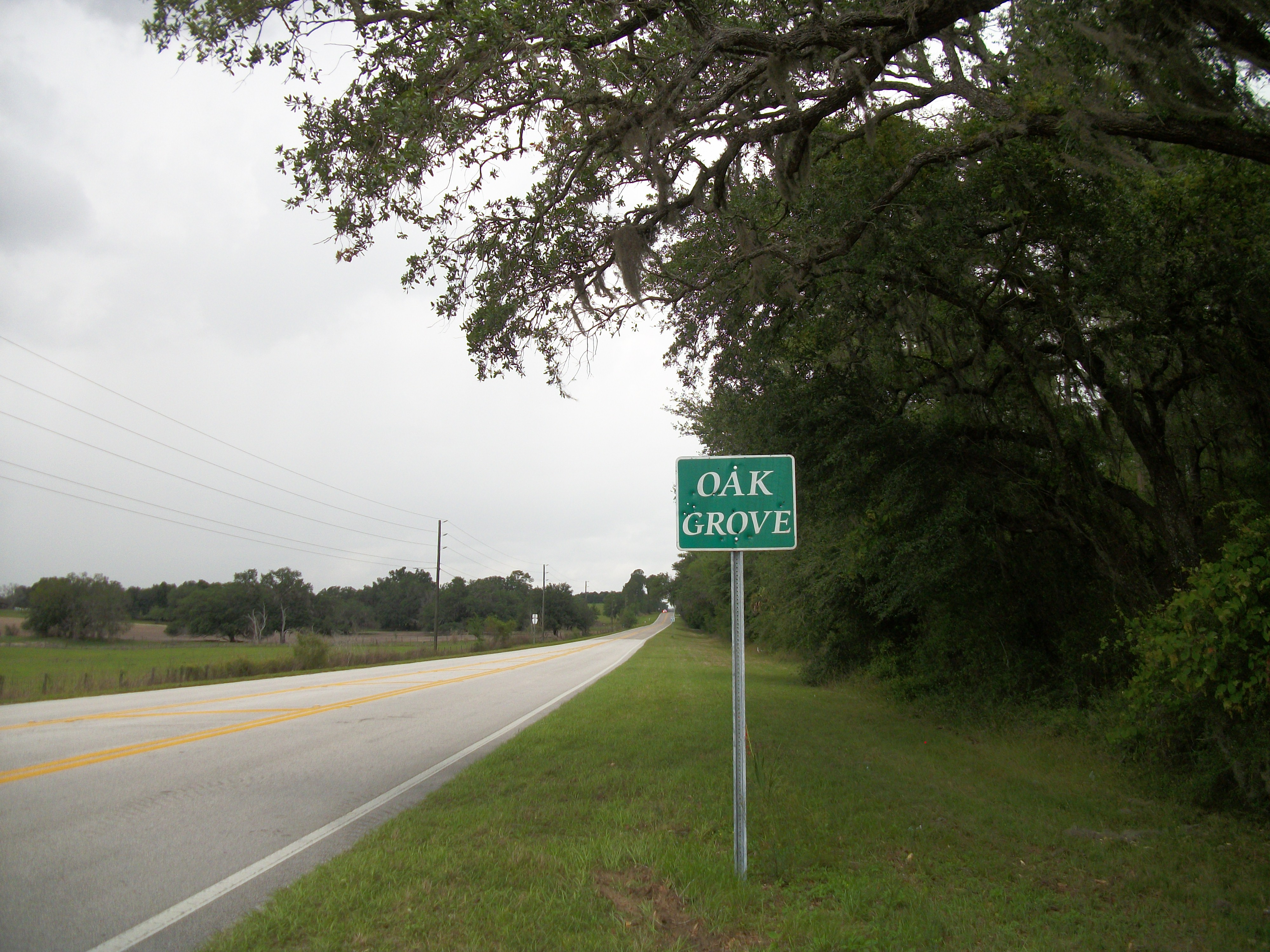
Northbound Citrus CR 491 as it enters Oak Grove, Florida.

CR 491 continues from the Hernando-Citrus County Line where the name changes from Citrus Way to Lecanto Highway. The first intersection is a local dirt road named Honeybee Lane, which is dwarfed by the later intersection with County Road 480 (West Stage Coach Road). Immediately a sign can be seen indicating the route's entry to Oak Grove, which is flanked mostly by farm and ranch land on the west side with the occasional private road intersection, and random houses in the woods that give way to land owned by the Withlacoochee State Forest on the east side. Throughout this area, the road climbs a series of hills. One brief opening of ranch land on the east side appears suddenly followed by a WSF trailhead, which is found on the west side of the road for a change. The route leaves Oak Grove just north of that trailhead. After the eastern terminus of Cardinal Lane the road makes a reverse curve to the right and passes a dirt road named for the nearby ghost town of Mannsfield, which is located somewhere in the forest. Right after West Noble Street, the route makes a sharp turn to the northwest at Trail 17. State forest territory exists on both sides of the road at this point, and has since the intersection with Noble Street. The road leaves the forest at a firehouse on the south side, as it enters the community it was named for, then starts to curve as it passes the entrance to the Lesiure Acres Community, and then a dirt road named Halo Hills Road, before finally runs back north and widens to a four-lane undivided highway just before approaching the eastern terminus of Grover Cleveland Boulevard. From there the road passes the Citrus Campus of the Central Florida Community College, and a local business before a signalized intersection with the Crystal River Quarries, and the Lecanto Educational Complex, which includes Lecanto High School. The road also passes various government offices, before intersecting with SR 44. After SR 44, CR 491 descends into a valley, especially as it approached the road to the Lecanto Post Office.

Just as it approaches a series of medical offices, the road curves to the northwest and then at the County Department of Mosquito Control office, curves to the northeast, where it will stay through much of the county. The road widens once again and this time turns into a divided highway before it approaches CR 486, also known as West Norvelle Bryant Highway. North of CR 486, Lecanto Highway passes by a Veterans Administration center that was once part of the notorious Brown School The road intersects the gateway to Black Diamond, and later passes along the northwestern edge of Beverly Hills. The first major intersection in this community is at West Roosevelt Boulevard and North Modelwood Drive, the former of which is the first gateway through Beverly Hills. The road remains a four-lane divided highway even as it approaches Pine Ridge at West Pine Ridge Boulevard. The divided highway ends as the road begins to narrow, but not before intersecting the northern terminus of a second Beverly Hill gateway known as Forest Ridge Boulevard. After this, CR 491 finally enters Pine Ridge itself. Throughout the community, the route remains two lanes wide with occasional provisions for left turn lanes, and has a noticeable right-of-way for a potential widening. The road curves slightly to the east before it approaches the south end of North Lecanto Highway, a gateway road to Citrus Springs, then approaches the Sandy Oaks RV Resort near the power line ROW leading from the former Crystal River 3 Nuclear Power Plant, and after this the gateway to Central Ridge District Park, before the road turns straight east and enters Holder, where it passes the Withlacoochee State Trail trailheads two blocks before intersecting US 41, which up until the Autumn of 2010 was a blinker-light intersection that was replaced as a normal signalized intersection. East of US 41, Lecanto Highway passes a series of dead end streets, including the entrance to the Quail Run community, and a ranch on the south side before approaching another trailhead within the Two-Mile Prairie Tract of the Withlacoochee State Forest at a former Seaboard Air Line Railroad line. The road takes a slight curve before approaching the same power lines it crossed west of Holder, and returns to the northeast once again. Between a dirt road named North Clark Point, and a private road named Twelve Oaks Place which leads to a private airport community, the road runs along a raised embankment over a dry lakebed. Citrus County Road 491 finally ends at SR 200 in Stoke's Ferry just south of the eastern terminus of the northern segment of Citrus County Road 39.

== County Road 494 ==
West Ozello Trail
- Location: Sunny Isles Estates-South of Crystal River

County Road 494 runs along West Ozello Trail in West Central Citrus County. It runs east and west from Sunny Isles Estates on the Gulf of Mexico to US 19–98 in Ozello, south of Crystal River. The route was formerly designated as SR 494.

== County Road 495 ==
North Citrus Avenue
- Location: Crystal River-De Rosa

County Road 495 runs south to north along almost all of North Citrus Avenue. It spans from US 19–98 in Crystal River to the south shore of Lake Rousseau in De Rosa. The route was formerly designated SR 495. Though another CR 495 exists in nearby Hernando County, Citrus CR 495 has no connection to that route.

=== Route description ===
North Citrus Avenue begins at Northeast 2nd Avenue, but Citrus County Road 495 doesn't begin until the intersection with US 19–98. This segment contains random tree-lined dividers, and is lined with antique stores, general stores and other local businesses. CR 495 leaves downtown Crystal River north of North Crystal Street, which leads to the former ACL Depot along the Crosstown Trail, two schools a library and SR 44. The last intersection providing a connection between US 19–98 at Crystal River Mall and SR 44 is a street named Turkey Oak Drive.

North of West Green Bay Lane, the road curves from straight north to northeast. After passing some residential dead end streets it runs under a power line right of way near the site of the proposed interchange with Suncoast Parkway. From there it passes through some tree farms, then encounters a grade crossing with a railroad line leading to the Crystal River 3 Nuclear Power Plant, and a second power line right-of-way right after that.

At some point after West Laura Street, the road enters Citronelle, runs straight north again, and passes the western terminus of West Dunklin Street, a local road used by schools and a Citrus County Recycling area. Shortly after the intersection with Badger Lane, the road enters De Rosa (or De Rosa Village), yet the rural surroundings remain intact. It passes between two trailer parks and a former Union 76 gas station before the intersection with Citrus County Road 488, a road spanning from Red Level to Citrus Springs.

The route continues north of CR 488 passing a local bar, a Citrus County fire house, and a small industrial area, but eventually becomes primarily residential, mixed with some sparse farm and ranch land. Curving to the northeast north of West Glendale Court, the road momentarily runs close to Lake Rousseau, but the view of the water is obstructed by woodlands, and later a farm field. The road serves as the eastern terminus of West Riverbend Road, then the western end of North Wahoo Trail, and is finally reunited with West Riverbend Road once again, where it terminates on the shores of Lake Rousseau.

== County Road 581 ==
County Road 581
- Location: North of Lake Lindsey-Inverness

County Road 581 is a continuation from Hernando CR 481 in Lake Lindsey in northern Hernando County. It runs south to north from the Hernando-Citrus County Line to a dead end at the Withlacoochee River, northeast of Inverness. The route was formerly designated at SR 581, and the connection to SR/CR 581 in southern Hernando, Pasco and Hillsborough Counties was severed by the renumbering of Snow Memorial Highway as CR 481.

=== Route description ===
Continuing from the Hernando-Citrus County Line in Lake Lindsey, Hernando CR 481 (Snow Memorial Highway) becomes Citrus County Road 581 and is renamed South Pleasant Grove Road. Like its Hernando County counterpart, it runs through local farm and ranch land with the occasional private dirt road intersection. Unlike that counterpart, the road runs up and down some hillier terrain, which becomes more prominent as the road runs further north. The route has a short overlap with CR 480, which suddenly branches off to the northeast towards Floral City. After the Emerald Hills community, the route makes a reverse curve to the right and runs along the east side of the Withlacoochee State Forest, though the east side of the road is also occupied by forest land that's not part of the state forest. Some small businesses begin to pop up on the east side after the intersection with East Amy Lane when the route skirts the western edge of Inverness Highlands South. North of East Triss Street, the route encounters more local businesses before serving as the location of the Shiridi Sai Hindu Temple, a rare landmark of eastern culture in rural Florida. After crossing a power line right-of-way and the entrance to a state forest fire tower, County Road 581 officially enters the Inverness City Limits, where it encounters the aptly named "Public Works Boulevard" which leads to the Inverness City Department of Public Works building, and then passes by the Pleasant Grove Elementary School, and after this the First Baptist Church of Inverness. Just north of the church, the route intersects East Haven Street and Druid Road, the latter of which leads to a Citrus County Library. State Forest territory officially ends south of the intersection of Kimberly Lane.

At West Main Street the road turns east in a hidden concurrency with SR 44. SR 44/CR 581 runs along the south side of Whispering Pines Park and passes a series of Citrus County school buildings between South Boulevard and east of South Montgomery Avenue. The overlap with SR 44 ends at Davidson Avenue when CR 581 turns north then crosses US 41, which joins SR 44 in its own overlap one block east. The route runs two blocks to the north then turns east onto Emery Street and turns north one block later onto Ella Avenue. Near the western shores of Henderson Lake, CR 581 curves to the northeast onto East Turner Camp Road, while Ella Avenue becomes a city maintained street, while CR 581 encounters an intersection with the Withlacoochee State Trail then curves straight north, only to make a sharp curve to the east at Twin Lake Road and then curves to the north again between East Grain Court and south of East Lakato Lane. The road curves to the northeast again north of North Sherri Lane and remains in that general trajectory throughout much of the remainder of its journey with some occasional exceptions when it briefly turns north. Citrus County Road 581 curves straight east for the last time at the intersections of North Hooty Point Road and North Junglecamp Road before it finally terminates at a dead end on the southwest coast of the Withlacoochee River, which contains a small dock and boat launching ramp.
