= Black Diamond, Florida =

Census-designated place in Florida, US

- Census-designated place
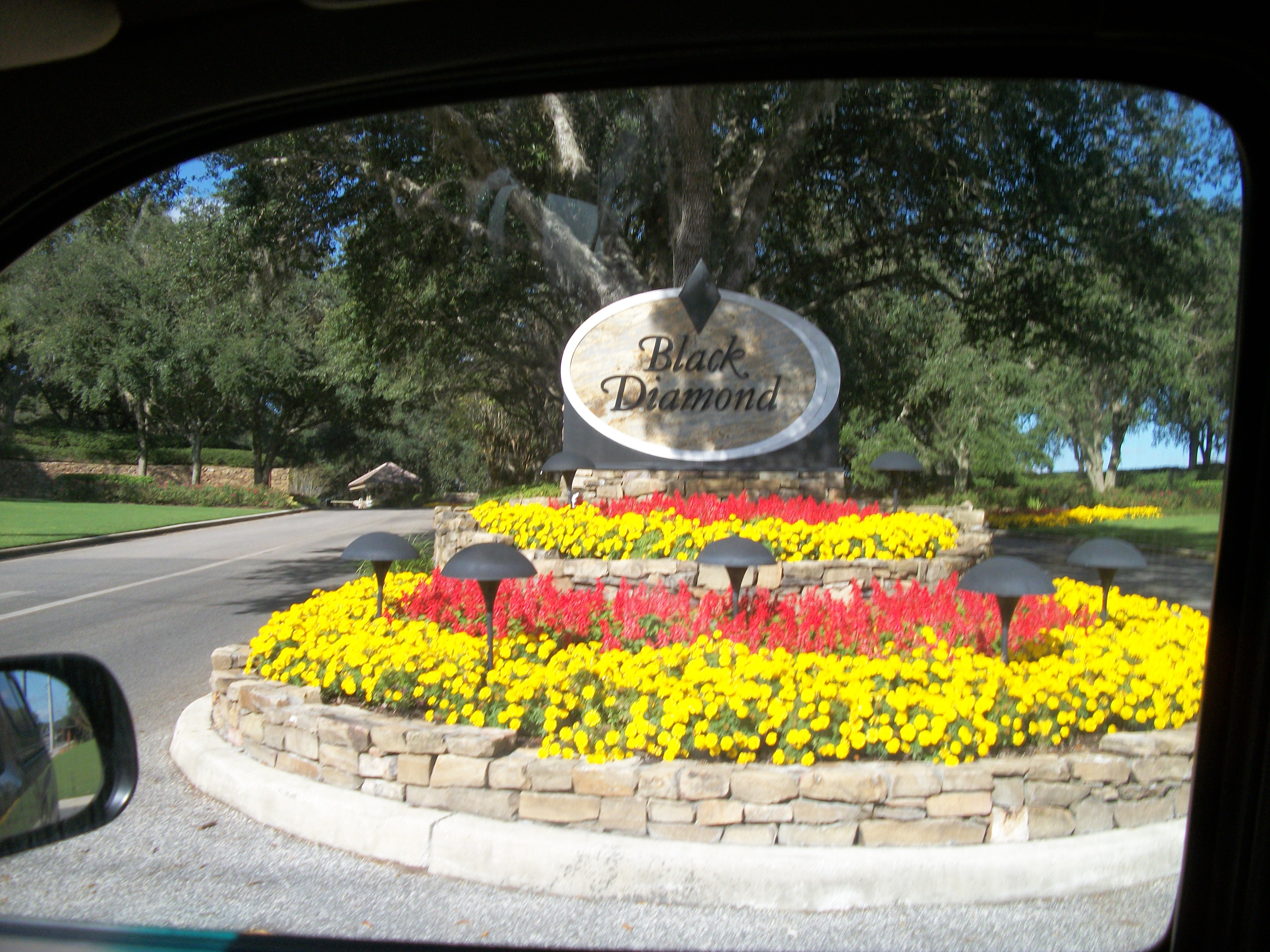
- The entrance to Black Diamond

- Flag

- Location in Citrus County and the state of Florida
- Coordinates: 28°54′04″N 82°30′24″W
- Country: United States
- State: Florida
- County: Citrus

Area
  - Total: 3.94 sq mi (10.21 km^{2})
  - Land: 3.94 sq mi (10.21 km^{2})
  - Water: 0 sq mi (0.00 km^{2})
- Elevation: 102 ft (31 m)

Population (2020)
  - Total: 1,255
  - Density: 318.3/sq mi (122.89/km^{2})
- Time zone: UTC-5 (Eastern (EST))
  - Summer (DST): UTC-4 (EDT)
- FIPS code: 12-06667
- GNIS feature ID: 2402691

Black Diamond is a census-designated place (CDP) in Citrus County, Florida, United States. The population was 1,255 at the 2020 census, up from 1,101 at the 2010 census. It is part of the Homosassa Springs, Florida Metropolitan Statistical Area.

== Geography ==
Black Diamond is located north of the geographic center of Citrus County. It is bordered to the north by Pine Ridge, to the east by Beverly Hills and Pine Ridge, and to the south by Lecanto. County Road 491 (North Lecanto Highway) forms the eastern edge of the CDP, leading northeast 5 miles (8 km) to U.S. Route 41 and south 4 miles (6 km) to State Road 44 in Lecanto.

According to the United States Census Bureau, the CDP has a total area of 3.9 square miles (10.2 km^{2}), all land.

== Demographics ==
Historical population
Census	Pop.	Note	%±
2000	694		—
2010	1,101		58.6%
2020	1,255		14.0%
U.S. Decennial Census

=== 2020 census ===
As of the 2020 census, Black Diamond had a population of 1,255. The median age was 66.9 years. 7.7% of residents were under the age of 18 and 54.2% of residents were 65 years of age or older. For every 100 females there were 86.8 males, and for every 100 females age 18 and over there were 87.1 males age 18 and over.

94.6% of residents lived in urban areas, while 5.4% lived in rural areas.

There were 558 households in Black Diamond, of which 15.6% had children under the age of 18 living in them. Of all households, 71.9% were married-couple households, 9.7% were households with a male householder and no spouse or partner present, and 14.9% were households with a female householder and no spouse or partner present. About 19.5% of all households were made up of individuals and 13.6% had someone living alone who was 65 years of age or older.

There were 652 housing units, of which 14.4% were vacant. The homeowner vacancy rate was 3.5% and the rental vacancy rate was 11.8%.

Racial composition as of the 2020 census
Race	Number	Percent
White	1,073	85.5%
Black or African American	12	1.0%
American Indian and Alaska Native	2	0.2%
Asian	111	8.8%
Native Hawaiian and Other Pacific Islander	1	0.1%
Some other race	9	0.7%
Two or more races	47	3.7%
Hispanic or Latino (of any race)	29	2.3%

=== 2000 census ===
As of the 2000 census, there were 694 people, 248 households, and 212 families residing in the CDP. The population density was 183.6 inhabitants per square mile (70.9/km^{2}). There were 374 housing units at an average density of 98.9 per square mile (38.2/km^{2}). The racial makeup of the CDP was 94.09% White, 0.72% African American, 4.61% Asian, and 0.58% from two or more races. Hispanic or Latino of any race were 1.01% of the population.

There were 248 households, out of which 15.3% had children under the age of 18 living with them, 84.7% were married couples living together, 0.8% had a female householder with no husband present, and 14.5% were non-families. 11.7% of all households were made up of individuals, and 4.0% had someone living alone who was 65 years of age or older. The average household size was 2.23 and the average family size was 2.39.

In the CDP the population was spread out, with 9.7% under the age of 18, 1.4% from 18 to 24, 10.7% from 25 to 44, 39.0% from 45 to 64, and 39.2% who were 65 years of age or older. The median age was 62 years. For every 100 females, there were 81.2 males. For every 100 females age 18 and over, there were 81.7 males.

The median income for a household in the CDP was $107,771, and the median income for a family was $105,987. Males had a median income of $0 versus $32,500 for females. The per capita income for the CDP was $53,621. About 5.7% of families and 3.7% of the population were below the poverty line, including none of those under the age of eighteen or sixty-five or over.

== Education ==
The CDP is served by Citrus County Schools. Residents are zoned to Central Ridge Elementary School. Residents are divided between Citrus Springs Middle and Crystal River Middle. Portions of the CDP are zoned to Crystal River High School and Lecanto High School.
