= Pine Ridge, Citrus County, Florida =

Census-designated place in Florida, US

Pine Ridge, Florida
- Census-designated place
- Location in Citrus County and the state of Florida
- Coordinates: 28°58′45″N 82°29′24″W
- Country: United States
- State: Florida
- Counties: Citrus

Area
  - Total: 24.9 sq mi (64.4 km^{2})
  - Land: 24.9 sq mi (64.4 km^{2})
  - Water: 0 sq mi (0 km^{2})
- Elevation: 66 ft (20 m)

Population (2020)
  - Total: 11,042
- Time zone: UTC-5 (Eastern (EST))
  - Summer (DST): UTC-4 (EDT)
- GNIS feature ID: 2403417

Pine Ridge is an unincorporated community and census-designated place (CDP) in Citrus County, Florida, United States. The population was 11,042 at the 2020 census, up from 9,598 at the 2010 census. It is part of the Homosassa Springs, Florida Metropolitan Statistical Area.

== Geography ==
Pine Ridge is located in north-central Citrus County. It is bordered to the north by Citrus Springs, to the east by Hernando, and to the south by Citrus Hills, Lecanto, and Black Diamond. In addition, Pine Ridge nearly surrounds the CDP of Beverly Hills.

According to the United States Census Bureau, the Pine Ridge CDP has a total area of 24.9 square miles (64.4 km^{2}), all land.

== Demographics ==
Historical population
Census	Pop.	Note	%±
2000	5,490		—
2010	9,598		74.8%
2020	11,042		15.0%

As of the census of 2000, there were 5,490 people, 2,355 households, and 1,836 families residing in the CDP. The population density was 217.6 inhabitants per square mile (84.0/km^{2}). There were 2,576 housing units at an average density of 102.1 per square mile (39.4/km^{2}). The racial makeup of the CDP was 94.75% White, 2.59% African American, 0.16% Native American, 1.42% Asian, 0.02% Pacific Islander, 0.31% from other races, and 0.75% from two or more races. Hispanic or Latino of any race were 2.82% of the population.

There were 2,355 households, out of which 14.1% had children under the age of 18 living with them, 72.1% were married couples living together, 3.9% had a female householder with no husband present, and 22.0% were non-families. 18.4% of all households were made up of individuals, and 13.2% had someone living alone who was 65 years of age or older. The average household size was 2.21 and the average family size was 2.48.

In the CDP, the population was spread out, with 12.1% under the age of 18, 2.4% from 18 to 24, 13.3% from 25 to 44, 32.8% from 45 to 64, and 39.4% who were 65 years of age or older. The median age was 60 years. For every 100 females, there were 87.3 males. For every 100 females age 18 and over, there were 86.5 males.

The median income for a household in the CDP was $43,464, and the median income for a family was $46,810. Males had a median income of $41,400 versus $25,366 for females. The per capita income for the CDP was $22,608. About 3.4% of families and 5.9% of the population were below the poverty line, including 8.8% of those under age 18 and 6.4% of those age 65 or over.

== Education ==
The CDP is served by Citrus County Schools. Residents are divided between Central Ridge Elementary and Forest Ridge Elementary. Residents are divided between Citrus Springs Middle, Crystal River Middle, and Lecanto Middle. Portions of the CDP are zoned to Crystal River High School and Lecanto High School.
