= Beverly Hills, Florida =

Census-designated place in Florida, United States

Beverly Hills
- Census-designated place
- Location in Citrus County and the state of Florida
- Coordinates: 28°55′03″N 82°27′15″W
- Country: United States
- State: Florida
- County: Citrus

Area
  - Total: 2.97 sq mi (7.68 km^{2})
  - Land: 2.97 sq mi (7.68 km^{2})
  - Water: 0 sq mi (0.00 km^{2})
- Elevation: 95 ft (29 m)

Population (2020)
  - Total: 9,961
  - Density: 3,357.3/sq mi (1,296.28/km^{2})
- Time zone: UTC-5 (Eastern (EST))
  - Summer (DST): UTC-4 (EDT)
- ZIP codes: 34464-34465
- Area code: 352
- FIPS code: 12-06125
- GNIS feature ID: 2402686

Beverly Hills is an unincorporated community and census-designated place in Citrus County, Florida, United States. The population was 9,961 at the 2020 census, up from 8,445 at the 2010 census. It is part of the Homosassa Springs, Florida Metropolitan Statistical Area.

== History ==
Sam Kellner, a Jewish businessman from New York, made a fortune in the tire business during the 1930s and 1940s, after which he went into construction and real estate development. Around 1960 he purchased 3,500 acres of land in interior Citrus County. Within a few years, Kellner began to develop the former cattle land, selling simple, single-story homes to retirees from the urban North, especially New York and Detroit. Kellner named his new venture Beverly Hills.

Beverly Hills was among the first retirement-oriented planned communities in Central Florida. Like other such developments in South Florida and the Tampa-St. Petersburg area, a private company—Kellner's Rolling Oaks Corporation—owned most of the non-residential property, including a nearby lumberyard and concrete plant. Purchasing land in a rural, inland area allowed Kellner to market the new community to working class retirees at affordable prices. Beverly Hills proved an early success, growing from 20 homes in the spring of 1962 to around 400 by the end of 1965. In 1972, the development's population reached 4,500 residents living in 2,200 homes.

In 1980, Beverly Hills Development Corp. purchased the subdivision from original developer Sam Kellner in 1980 and nine years later it was sold to Morrison Homes, the Atlanta-based home builder which ceased selling homes in the subdivision in 1999.

== Geography ==
Beverly Hills is located in north-central Citrus County. It is nearly surrounded by the community of Pine Ridge, except for a small area on the west where it is bordered by Black Diamond. County Road 491 (North Lecanto Highway) forms the northwestern edge of the Beverly Hills CDP, leading northeast 4 miles (6 km) to U.S. Route 41 and southwest 5 miles (8 km) to State Road 44 in Lecanto.

According to the United States Census Bureau, the CDP has a total area of 3.0 square miles (7.7 km^{2}), all land.

== Demographics ==
Historical population
Census	Pop.	Note	%±
1990	6,163		—
2000	8,317		35.0%
2010	8,445		1.5%
2020	9,961		18.0%
U.S. Decennial Census

=== 2020 census ===
As of the 2020 census, Beverly Hills had a population of 9,961. The median age was 51.6 years. 17.7% of residents were under the age of 18 and 30.1% of residents were 65 years of age or older. For every 100 females, there were 86.5 males, and for every 100 females age 18 and over, there were 83.4 males age 18 and over.

100.0% of residents lived in urban areas, while 0.0% lived in rural areas.

There were 4,636 households in Beverly Hills, of which 20.6% had children under the age of 18 living in them. Of all households, 34.2% were married-couple households, 19.7% were households with a male householder and no spouse or partner present, and 36.3% were households with a female householder and no spouse or partner present. About 37.3% of all households were made up of individuals, and 21.9% had someone living alone who was 65 years of age or older.

There were 5,151 housing units, of which 10.0% were vacant. The homeowner vacancy rate was 2.2%, and the rental vacancy rate was 8.1%.

Racial composition as of the 2020 census
Race	Number	Percent
White	8,093	81.2%
Black or African American	477	4.8%
American Indian and Alaska Native	36	0.4%
Asian	182	1.8%
Native Hawaiian and Other Pacific Islander	3	0.0%
Some other race	321	3.2%
Two or more races	849	8.5%
Hispanic or Latino (of any race)	1,122	11.3%

=== 2000 census ===
As of the census of 2000, there were 8,317 people, 4,401 households, and 2,583 families residing in the CDP. The population density was 2,922.0 inhabitants per square mile (1,128.2/km^{2}). There were 4,925 housing units at an average density of 1,730.3 per square mile (668.1/km^{2}). The racial makeup of the CDP was 95.90% White, 1.71% African American, 0.19% Native American, 0.60% Asian, 0.01% Pacific Islander, 0.38% from other races, and 1.20% from two or more races. Hispanic or Latino of any race were 3.97% of the population.

There were 4,401 households, out of which 10.9% had children under the age of 18 living with them, 50.4% were married couples living together, 6.5% had a female householder with no husband present, and 41.3% were non-families. 36.9% of all households were made up of individuals, and 28.5% had someone living alone who was 65 years of age or older. The average household size was 1.87 and the average family size was 2.35.

In the CDP, the population was spread out, with 10.8% under the age of 18, 3.4% from 18 to 24, 13.2% from 25 to 44, 17.6% from 45 to 64, and 54.9% who were 65 years of age or older. The median age was 68 years. For every 100 females, there were 80.6 males. For every 100 females age 18 and over, there were 78.2 males.

The median income for a household in the CDP was $24,875, and the median income for a family was $31,505. Males had a median income of $27,500 versus $16,857 for females. The per capita income for the CDP was $17,014. About 8.4% of families and 12.4% of the population were below the poverty line, including 20.3% of those under age 18 and 9.0% of those age 65 or over.

== Public transportation ==
Citrus County Transit's Orange route serves Beverly Hills.

== Education ==
The CDP is served by Citrus County Schools. Residents are divided between Forest Ridge Elementary School and Central Ridge Elementary School. Residents are divided between Citrus Springs Middle and Lecanto Middle. All residents are zoned to Lecanto High School.

St. Paul's Lutheran School is a Christian Pre-K-8 school of the Wisconsin Evangelical Lutheran Synod in Beverly Hills.

The Central Ridge Library of Citrus Libraries is in Beverly Hills.
