= Ozello, Florida =

Unincorporated community in Florida, U.S.

Coordinates: 28°49′33″N 82°39′25″W

Ozello is an unincorporated community in Citrus County, Florida, United States, located between Crystal River and Homosassa on the state's west coast.

The population in 1900 was 49; in 1890, it was zero.

Ozello consists of several keys which are connected by The Ozello Trail (C.R. 494) a twisting roadway that has several sharp curves running west off of U.S. 19-98. The trail is very popular with motorcyclists, and features a great deal of wildlife scenery.
