= Academy of Environmental Science =

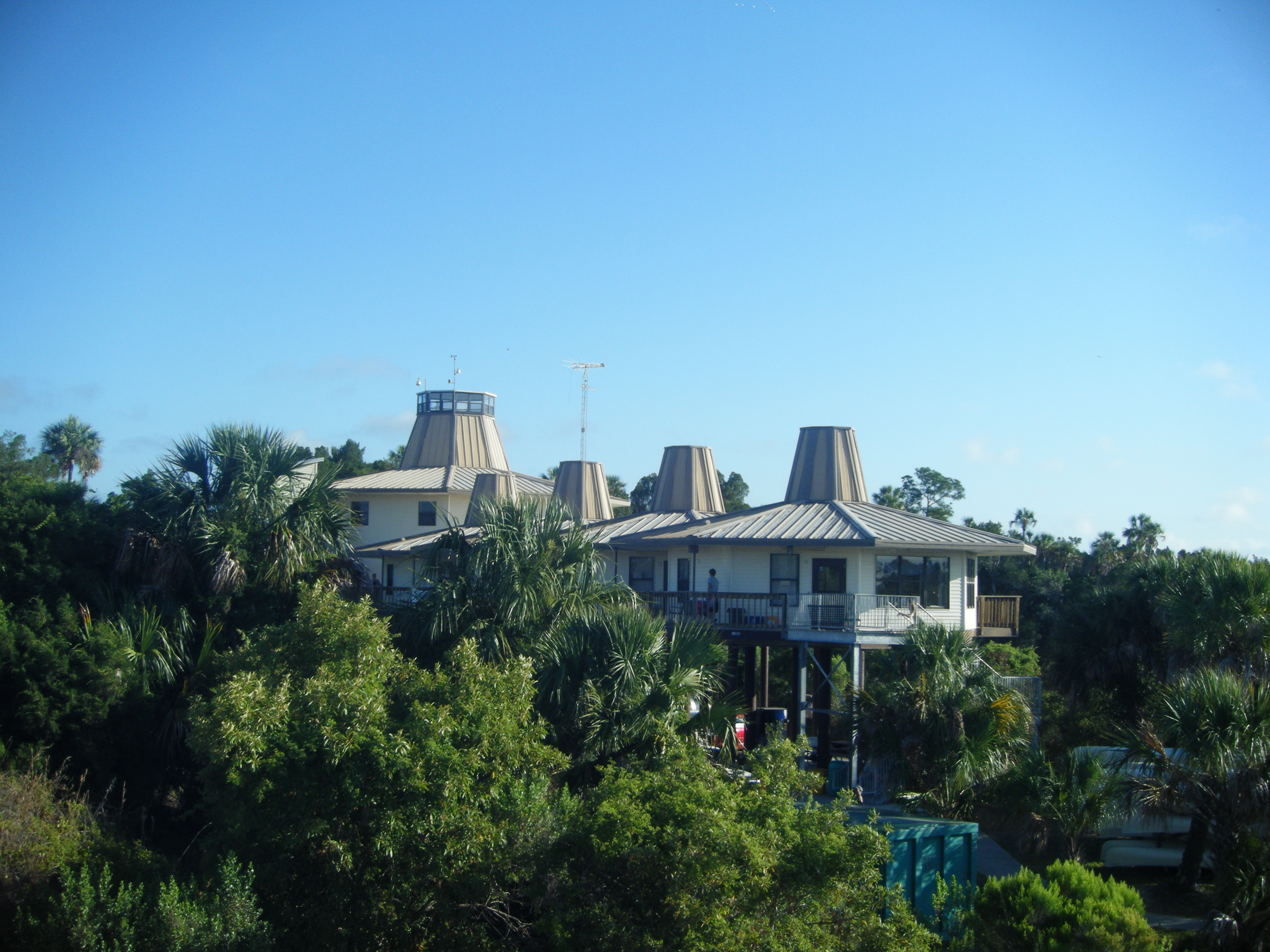

Location
- 12695 W Fort Island Trail; Crystal River, Citrus County, Florida 34429; United States
- 28.905075°N 82.647979°W

Information
- Funding type: Public charter school
- Founded: 1999
- School district: Citrus County School District
- NCES District ID: 1200270
- CEEB code: 100241
- NCES School ID: 120027004326
- Administrator: Ernest Hopper
- Teaching staff: 6.00 (FTE)
- Grades: 9–10
- Enrollment: 115 (2023–2024)
- Student to teacher ratio: 19.17
- Campus type: Rural Fringe
- Website: aes.citrusschools.org

The Academy of Environmental Science (AES) is a public charter school in Crystal River, Citrus County, Florida, United States, and a part of the Citrus County School District. The Academy is located on Fort Island, near Fort Island Gulf Beach.

== SCUBA Program ==
AES, in partnership with Crystal River Kayak Company and Dive Center, runs a program which allows for 10th grade HOPE students to receive a NAUI Open Water Scuba certification at a reduced cost. This program has been in place since 2017.

== See also ==
- List of high schools in Florida
