= Hernando, Florida =

Census-designated place in Florida, US

Hernando
- Census-designated place
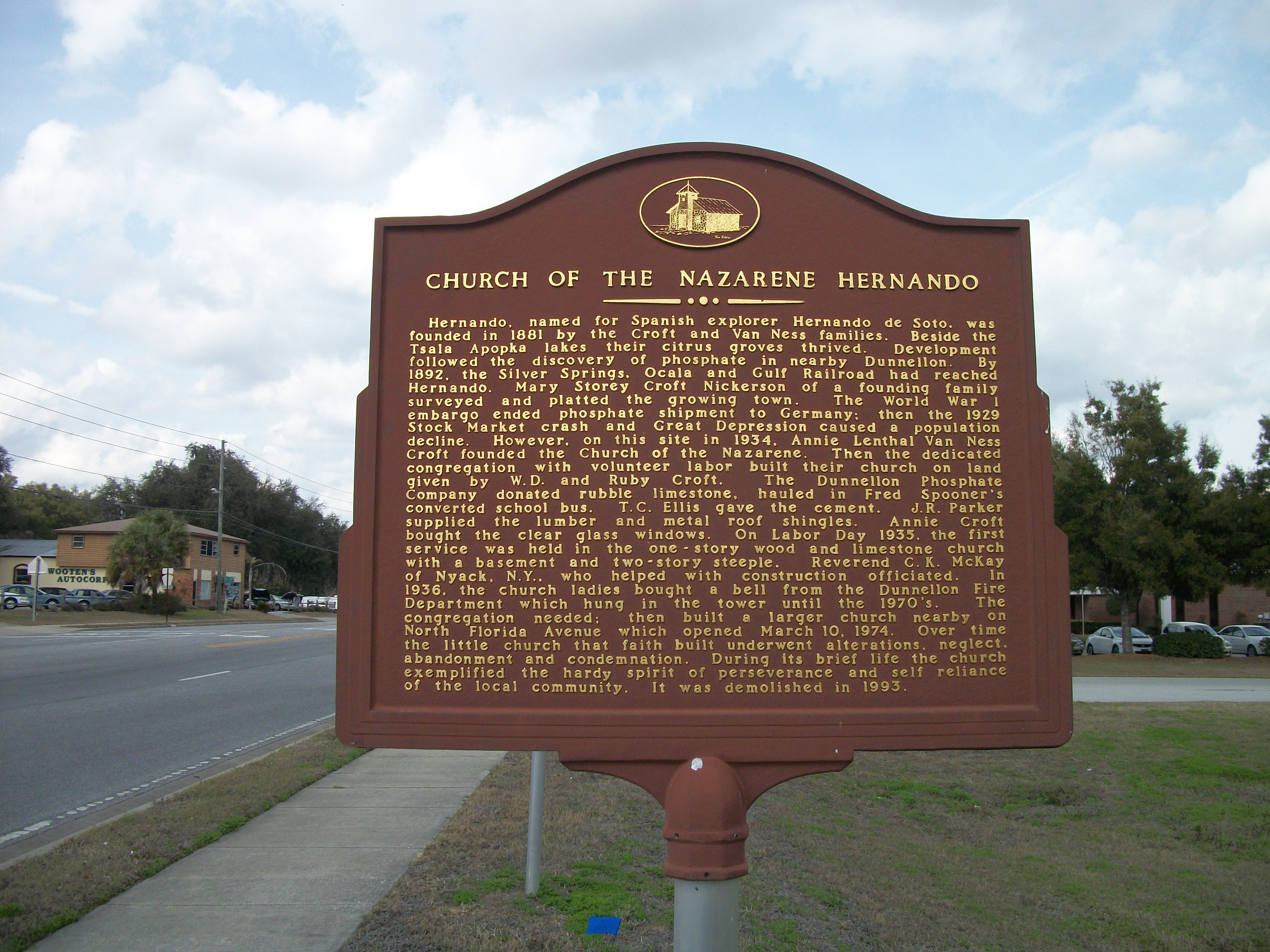
- Site of the former Hernando Church of the Nazarene along US 41
- Motto: Go Bucs
- Location in Citrus County and the state of Florida
- Coordinates: 28°56′42″N 82°22′12″W
- Country: United States
- State: Florida
- County: Citrus

Area
  - Total: 35.54 sq mi (92.05 km^{2})
  - Land: 31.71 sq mi (82.14 km^{2})
  - Water: 3.83 sq mi (9.91 km^{2})
- Elevation: 66 ft (20 m)

Population (2020)
  - Total: 9,284
  - Density: 292.7/sq mi (113.03/km^{2})
- Time zone: UTC-5 (Eastern (EST))
  - Summer (DST): UTC-4 (EDT)
- ZIP code: 34442
- Area code: 352
- FIPS code: 12-29425
- GNIS feature ID: 2402580

Hernando is a census-designated place in Citrus County, Florida, United States. The population was 9,284 at the 2020 census, up from 9,054 at the 2010 census. At one time it was a city but it was disincorporated in the 1970s. It is part of the Homosassa Springs, Florida Metropolitan Statistical Area.

== Geography ==
Hernando is located in northeastern Citrus County. It is bordered by Citrus Springs to the northwest, Pine Ridge to the west, Citrus Hills to the southwest, Inverness Highlands North to the south, and Marion County to the north. The eastern edge of the CDP extends into Tsala Apopka Lake, a network of lakes and wetlands that are part of the Withlacoochee River system.

According to the United States Census Bureau, the CDP has a total area of 35.6 square miles (92.1 km^{2}), of which 31.7 square miles (82.1 km^{2}) is land and 3.9 square miles (10.0 km^{2}), or 10.85%, is water.

== Demographics ==
Historical population
Census	Pop.	Note	%±
1990	2,103		—
2000	8,253		292.4%
2010	9,054		9.7%
2020	9,284		2.5%
U.S. Decennial Census

=== 2020 census ===
As of the 2020 census, Hernando had a population of 9,284. The median age was 58.3 years. 14.3% of residents were under the age of 18 and 37.5% of residents were 65 years of age or older. For every 100 females there were 100.0 males, and for every 100 females age 18 and over there were 98.5 males age 18 and over.

80.8% of residents lived in urban areas, while 19.2% lived in rural areas.

There were 4,355 households in Hernando, of which 14.9% had children under the age of 18 living in them. Of all households, 45.6% were married-couple households, 21.5% were households with a male householder and no spouse or partner present, and 24.9% were households with a female householder and no spouse or partner present. About 33.6% of all households were made up of individuals and 20.4% had someone living alone who was 65 years of age or older.

There were 5,386 housing units, of which 19.1% were vacant. The homeowner vacancy rate was 2.9% and the rental vacancy rate was 11.7%.

Racial composition as of the 2020 census
Race	Number	Percent
White	8,383	90.3%
Black or African American	132	1.4%
American Indian and Alaska Native	41	0.4%
Asian	94	1.0%
Native Hawaiian and Other Pacific Islander	2	0.0%
Some other race	119	1.3%
Two or more races	513	5.5%
Hispanic or Latino (of any race)	405	4.4%

=== 2000 census ===
As of the census of 2000, there were 8,253 people, 3,730 households, and 2,514 families residing in the CDP. The population density was 262.2 inhabitants per square mile (101.2/km^{2}). There were 4,750 housing units at an average density of 150.9 per square mile (58.3/km^{2}). The racial makeup of the CDP was 95.58% White, 2.27% African American, 0.29% Native American, 0.52% Asian, 0.06% Pacific Islander, 0.17% from other races, and 1.11% from two or more races. Hispanic or Latino of any race were 1.64% of the population.

There were 3,730 households, out of which 18.5% had children under the age of 18 living with them, 55.8% were married couples living together, 7.8% had a female householder with no husband present, and 32.6% were non-families. 26.2% of all households were made up of individuals, and 14.0% had someone living alone who was 65 years of age or older. The average household size was 2.21 and the average family size was 2.62.

In the CDP, the population was spread out, with 17.2% under the age of 18, 4.9% from 18 to 24, 20.8% from 25 to 44, 29.1% from 45 to 64, and 28.0% who were 65 years of age or older. The median age was 51 years. For every 100 females, there were 97.2 males. For every 100 females age 18 and over, there were 94.9 males.

The median income for a household in the CDP was $29,121, and the median income for a family was $35,118. Males had a median income of $26,084 versus $21,460 for females. The per capita income for the CDP was $15,030. About 11.6% of families and 15.4% of the population were below the poverty line, including 25.7% of those under age 18 and 11.0% of those age 65 or over.

== Transportation and recreation ==
U.S. Route 41 is the main road through Hernando, leading south 5 miles (8 km) to Inverness, the county seat, and north 12 miles (19 km) to Dunnellon. Two other roads that terminate in Hernando at US 41 are State Road 200 and County Road 486, known as West Norvell Bryant Highway. Hernando lies along the North boundary of the Tsala Apopka chain of lakes. The community of Hernando has a long-standing heritage of airboating (fan boats) which navigate the thousands of acres of swamp that lies to the east. Hernando is home to the Citrus County Airboat Alliance a civic group that promotes environmental stewardship and protecting the rights of airboat operators. Fishing and hunting are popular outdoor activities in the Hernando community.

Hernando features a 46-mile (74 km) bike riding trail known as the Withlacoochee State Trail which was converted from the former Atlantic Coast Line Railroad line that had been built in the early 1900s. The Hernando Trailhead can be found on the northwest corner of US 41 and CR 486.

Until 2006, Hernando was the home of the Ted Williams Museum.

== Education ==
The CDP is served by Citrus County Schools. Elementary schools serving sections of the CDP include Central Ridge and Hernando. Middle schools serving sections of the CDP include Citrus Springs and Inverness. High schools serving sections of Hernando CDP include Citrus High School and Lecanto High School.
