= Benjamin L. Lev =

American physicist and professor

- Born: Colorado Springs, CO
- Education: Princeton University (A.B.); Caltech (Ph.D.)
- Known for: Quantum many-body physics: •Dipolar quantum gases; •Multimode cavity QED; •Quantum sensors
- Awards: Packard Fellowship; Presidential Early Career Award for Scientists and Engineers; National Science Foundation CAREER Award
- Scientific career
- Fields: Atomic, molecular, and optical physics; Quantum optics; Quantum gases; Quantum simulation; Quantum sensing
- Workplaces: Stanford University
- Doctoral advisor: Hideo Mabuchi
- Other academic advisors: Jun Ye (postdoc)
- Website: levlab.stanford.edu

Benjamin Leonard Lev is an American physicist and the Stanford Fortitude Professor and Professor of Physics and Applied Physics at Stanford University. He studies quantum many-body physics, both in and out of equilibrium, by combining the tools of ultracold atomic physics, quantum optics, and condensed matter physics.

== Biography ==
Lev grew up in Crystal River, Florida, and attended Crystal River High School. He received his physics bachelor's degree magna cum laude from Princeton in 1999 and his physics Ph.D. from Caltech in 2005, working with Hideo Mabuchi. Lev was an NRC postdoc at JILA with (2006-2007) Jun Ye and an assistant professor at the University of Illinois at Urbana-Champaign (2008-2011). He joined the Stanford faculty in 2011, where he is now Professor of Physics and Applied Physics and runs a quantum many-body physics research lab.

== Work ==
Lev's research focuses on exploring quantum many-body physics, especially in nonequilibrium settings. The contributions of his group include:

- The first laser cooling and trapping of dysprosium, followed by the first creation of a Bose-Einstein condensate (BEC) and a degenerate Fermi gas of Dy. These were the first quantum gases of an open-shell lanthanide (rare-earth) element. Dysprosium is the most magnetic fermionic element, and terbium and the bosonic isotopes of Dy are the most magnetic bosonic elements. Together with prior work on BECs of chromium, Lev's work opened new research directions using highly magnetic dipolar quantum gases for quantum many-body experiments.
- First direct observation of replica symmetry breaking and ultrametricity from microscopic measurements of spin configurations. This was realized using the first quantum-optical spin glass, which was created using multimode cavity QED. Both vector and Ising spin glasses have been realized, the latter made the PRL cover and Collection of the Year 2025. The Lev group also realized an associative memory with capacity that exceeds the Hopfield limit under Hebbian learning. The enhanced capacity arises due to the multimode cavity QED dynamics and a novel polaronic effect that resulted in short-term plasticity of the network connectivity.
- The use of 1D gases of Dy to create a novel hierarchy of quantum many-body scar states in 2020. This was realized by the discovery of a dipolar stabilization mechanism that allows super-Tonks-Girardeau states to be prepared using a topological pump in energy space.
- Creation of the first optical lattice with sound. The lattice had phonon excitations and formed the first supersolid that possesses a key property of solids, vibration. This work was based on the system of confocal multimode cavity QED with BECs, which was developed by his group and collaborators.
- Development of a quantum sensor called the SQCRAMscope, a Scanning Quantum Cryogenic Atom Microscope. It was employed in the imaging of nematic electron transport in iron-based superconductors.

== Awards and fellowships ==
Lev has received several awards for his work, including a Presidential Early Career Award for Scientists and Engineers (PECASE) from President Obama. and a Packard Foundation Fellowship, as well as National Science Foundation CAREER Award and Air Force Office of Scientific Research, DARPA, and Office of Naval Research Young Investigator Program awards. Lev was elected a fellow of the American Physical Society "for groundbreaking experiments on quantum gases of lanthanide atoms with large magnetic dipole moments, theoretically proposing and experimentally demonstrating many-body multimode cavity QED for many-body physics and the demonstration of novel scanning quantum gas imaging of quantum materials." He serves on the editorial board of Physical Review X.

== External media ==
- Virtual AMO Seminar: Ben Lev (Stanford University)
