= Crystal River High School =

Public high school in Crystal River, Florida, United States

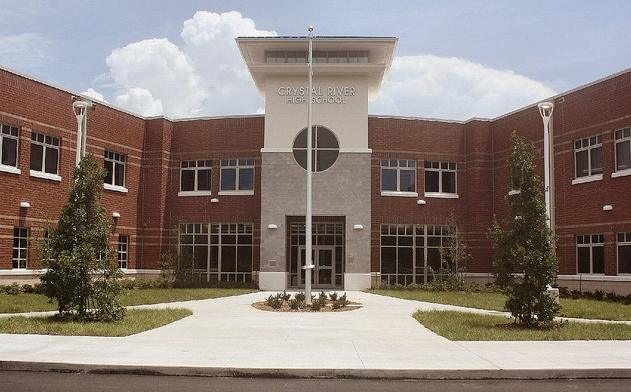
- Building 100 at Crystal River High School

Location
- 1205 N.E. 8th Avenue; Crystal River, Citrus, Florida 34428; United States
- 28.9061°N 82.5797°W

Information
- School type: Public
- Motto: "One Crew. One Ship. One Voyage."
- Established: 1969
- School board: Citrus County School District
- School district: 9
- Dean: Leah Grady, Nicole Callahan
- Principal: Phillip McLeod
- Teaching staff: 63.00 (FTE)
- Grades: 9-12
- Enrollment: 1,249 (2022-2023)
- Student to teacher ratio: 19.83
- Campus type: Contemporary
- Colours: Royal blue and gold
- Athletics: Baseball; Cheerleading; Soccer; Football; Softball; Swimming; Track and field; Weightlifting; Basketball; Cross country; Golf; Tennis; Volleyball; Wrestling
- Athletics conference: 3A District 6
- Mascot: Pirate
- Nickname: CRHS
- Rival: Citrus High School / Lecanto High School
- Accreditation: Southern Association of Colleges and Schools
- FCAT average: B(as of '11-'12)
- Newspaper: Pirate's Log crhspirateslog.com
- Yearbook: Tesora Arca
- Graduates (2011-2012): 91.7%
- Website: crh.citrusschools.org

Crystal River High School was built in Crystal River, Florida in 1969. It was the second of the high schools located in Citrus County. The first enrollment count was 750 students. As of 2022, it is rated #3 out of 5 in Crystal River.

The school serves the following communities: Crystal River, Homosassa, and sections of Black Diamond, Citrus Springs, Homosassa Springs, Pine Ridge, and Sugarmill Woods.

== Spirit ==
- Motto: Make footprints with your heart.
- Mascot: Pete the Pirate.
- School colors: Royal blue and gold.
- Clubs: Crystal River has approximately 36 clubs and activities (not including sports).
- School store: Scallywags (Opened as of spring 2006).

2000-2001: The "Victory Bell" (once located in the high school courtyard and used to celebrate athletic victories) goes missing before the beginning of school in August. Although Citrus High School students had relocated the bell many times in the past as a prank, the bell had always been discovered; the bell was found this time at the Citrus football field. "C.H.S. Rules" was written in the sand next to where the bell had once lived.

2003-2004: Citrus High School students climbed the fence of Crystal River High School the night before homecoming. They were dressed in camouflage, and they were armed with paintball guns. Their goal was to paintball the school floats that would be used for the homecoming parade. MTV later became aware of the prank, and the Citrus High School students (along with the participation of some Crystal River High School students) reenacted the nights events. It was aired on MTV's High School Stories.

== Notable alumni ==
- Jeff Cunningham, American soccer player who formerly played for the Columbus Crew in Major League Soccer, as well as the United States men's national soccer team
- Donnie Dewees, American professional baseball outfielder for the Chicago Cubs
- Mike Hampton, former Major League Baseball pitcher
- Rob Hermann, American Greco-Roman wrestler and coach
- Benjamin L. Lev, American quantum physicist at Stanford University
- Fred McKinnon, former college basketball standout
