= Floral City Historic District =

Historic district in Florida, United States

- U.S. National Register of Historic Places
- U.S. Historic district
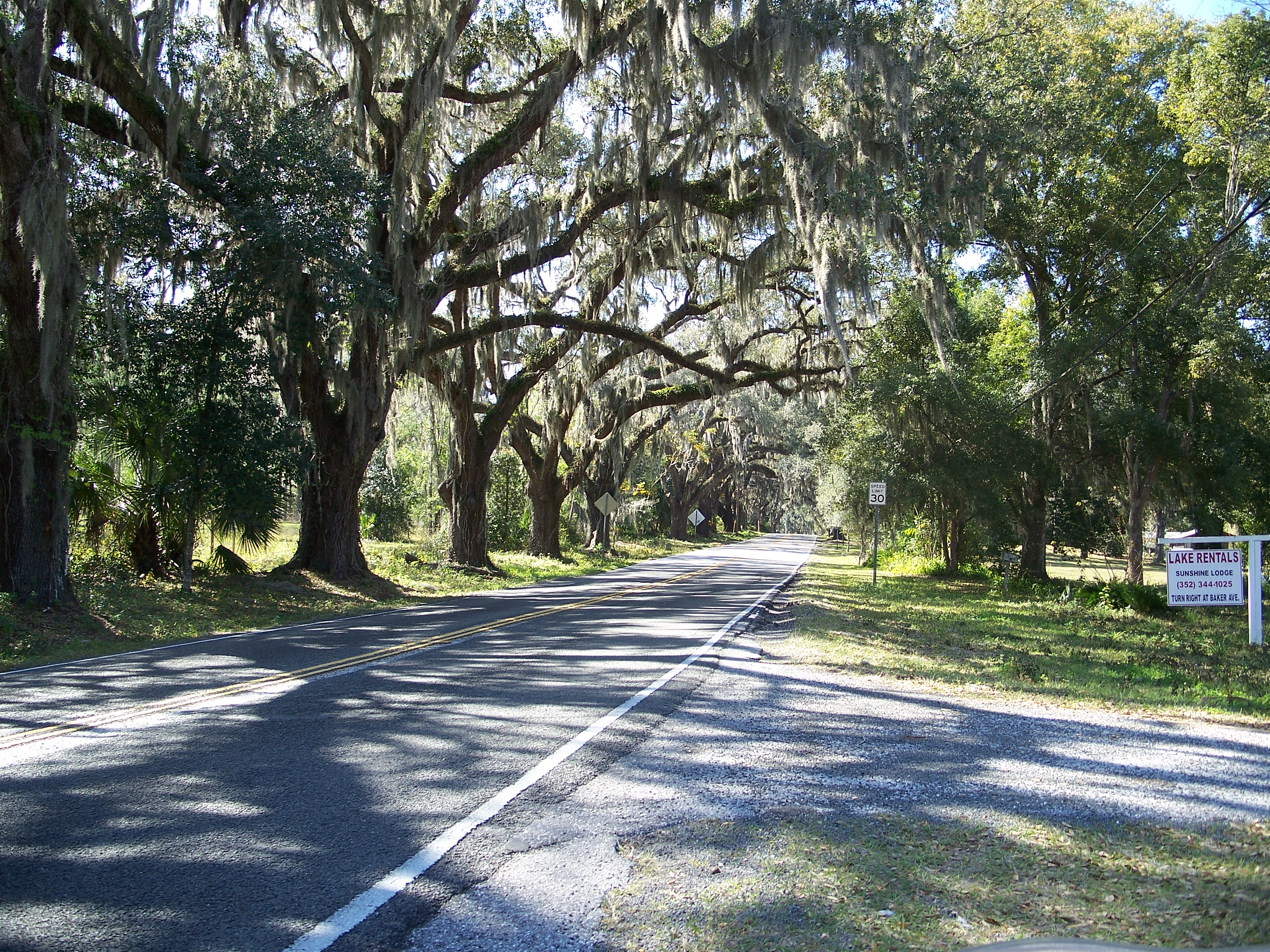
- Eastern entrance to the district, on Orange Avenue

- Location within Florida Location within the United States
- Location: Floral City, Florida
- Coordinates: 28°45′2″N 82°17′27″W
- Area: 20 acres (81,000 m^{2})
- NRHP reference No.: 93001357
- Added to NRHP: December 1, 1993

The Floral City Historic District is a U.S. Historic District (designated as such on December 1, 1993) located in Floral City, Florida. The district runs roughly along Orange Avenue from South Old Floral City Road to South Annie Terrace and South Aroostook Way from Orange to Tsala Apopka Lake. It contains 26 historic buildings and 2 structures.
