= Lecanto High School =

Location
- 3810 W. Educational Path; Lecanto, Florida 34461; United States; 28°49′27.30″N 82°29′57.17″W

Information
- Type: Public Secondary School
- Established: 1984
- School board: Citrus County School District
- Principal: Troy LaBarbara
- Teaching staff: 83.17 (FTE)
- Grades: 9 to 12
- Enrollment: 1,763 (2023-2024)
- Student to teacher ratio: 21.20
- Campus: Lecanto Educational Complex
- Campus size: 160 acres (0.65 km^{2})
- Colors: Green and gold
- Slogan: “Every Panther, Every Day”
- Fight song: Panther Prowl by Former Band Director Bobby Crane
- Mascot: Florida panther
- Yearbook: The Legacy
- Website: lhs.citrusschools.org

Lecanto High School is a secondary school in Lecanto, Florida. It is a public high school in the Citrus County School District. The school covers grades 9-12, with approximately 1740 students and 103 faculty. Lecanto High School also offers extensive advanced placement courses, International Baccalaureate courses, and dual-enrollment courses in conjunction with College of Central Florida.

It serves the following communities: Lecanto, Beverly Hills, sections of Black Diamond, Citrus Hills, Citrus Springs, Hernando, Homosassa Springs, Pine Ridge, and Sugarmill Woods.

== History ==
The school opened in 1984, and the first graduating class was in 1985. The school is built on a 160-acre (650,000 m^{2}) property known as the Lecanto Educational Complex. The property is also home to CREST School, Renaissance Center, Citrus County Instructional Resource Center, Citrus County Schools Student Services offices, Lecanto Primary School, Lecanto Middle School, and Lecanto School of Art. Central Florida Community College was also located on the site from 1984 to 1996, when they moved onto their own campus. As of 2009, Lecanto High School is part of the International Baccalaureate program.

== Classes ==
In the 1996-97 school year, Lecanto switched its class scheduling to a "4X4 block" type schedule. Each student plans their schedule specifically depending on the student's goals after High school. Schedules and curriculum are built around whether the student is planning to work directly after graduation, attend a two-year vocational program, or planning for college. The students must also pick a major, which will focus their studies on a more specific field.

As of 2007, Lecanto High School had average FCAT scores of 314.5 in mathematics, 317 in writing, and 315 in science. The state averages that same year were 316.25, 295.33, and 295.33 respectively.

As of the 2018 school year, Lecanto has switched back to using the seven periods scheduling Monday through Wednesday. Starting in 2021, they have added a "Power Hour", called "Panther Hour" after the school's mascot, to their schedules for clubs, chat, or social activities on Thursdays and Fridays, which changed to just Fridays for a longer duration of time and follows the "4X4 Block" scheduling.

== Sports ==
Lecanto High School has won state championships in the following sports:

- Boys Cross Country (1994)
- Boys Soccer (2004)
- Softball (1996)

== Band ==
In 2011, 2012, 2014, and 2015, the Lecanto High School Marching Band ended in the top 10 in the 2A class in the Florida Marching Band Coalition (FMBC). On October 15, 2019, the band hosted its first marching competition that was won by East Ridge High School.

=== Notable accomplishments ===
- 2011 Ocala Marching Band Festival, class 2A, Champion
- 2012 Brave the Pressure, class 2A, 7th place
- 2014 Almost Human, class 2A, 9th place
- 2015 Double Agent, class 2A, 7th place
- 2021 Tarpon Springs Outdoor Musical Festival, class 1A, Grand Champion
- 2025 Tarpon Springs Outdoor Musical Festival, class 2A, 2nd place

== Notable alumni ==
- Miles Teller, actor
