= Citrus Springs, Florida =

Census-designated place in Florida, US

Citrus Springs
- Census-designated place
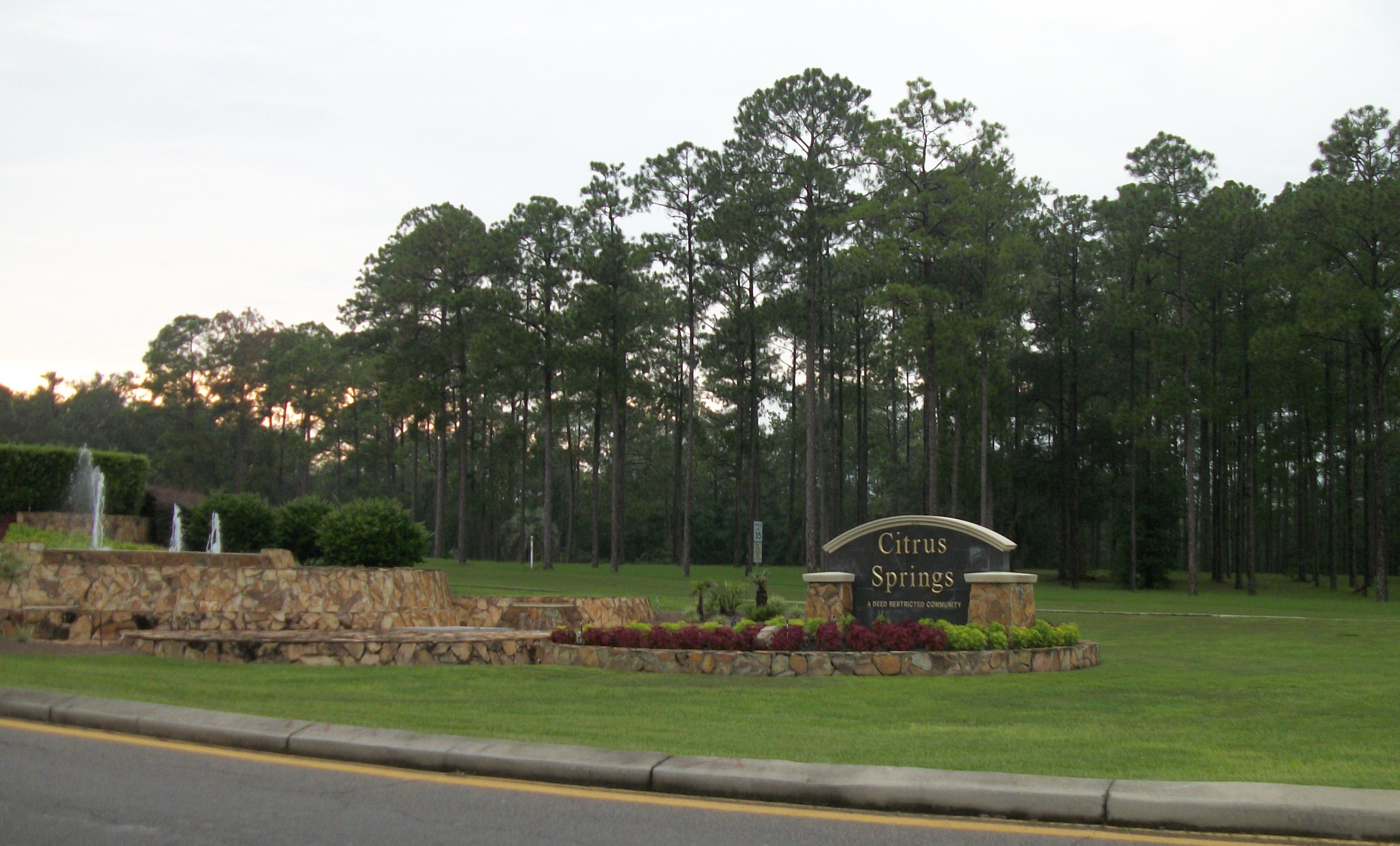
- The gateway to Citrus Springs on the west side of US 41

- Location in Citrus County and the state of Florida
- Coordinates: 28°59′37″N 82°28′42″W
- Country: United States
- State: Florida
- County: Citrus

Government
  - Body: Citrus Springs Advisory Council

Area
  - Total: 21.15 sq mi (54.77 km^{2})
  - Land: 21.15 sq mi (54.77 km^{2})
  - Water: 0 sq mi (0.00 km^{2})
- Elevation: 98 ft (30 m)

Population (2020)
  - Total: 10,246
  - Density: 484.5/sq mi (187.08/km^{2})
- Time zone: UTC-5 (Eastern (EST))
  - Summer (DST): UTC-4 (EDT)
- ZIP codes: 34433-34434
- Area code: 352
- FIPS code: 12-12450
- GNIS feature ID: 2402777

Citrus Springs is a census-designated place (CDP) in Citrus County, Florida, United States. The population was 10,246 at the 2020 census, up from 8,622 at the 2010 census. It is part of the Homosassa Springs, Florida Metropolitan Statistical Area.

== Geography ==
Citrus Springs is located in northern Citrus County. It is bordered by Pine Ridge to the south and Hernando to the east. U.S. Route 41 (North Florida Avenue) runs through the CDP, leading southeast 15 miles (24 km) to Inverness, the Citrus County seat, and north 3 miles (5 km) to Dunnellon in Marion County.

According to the United States Census Bureau, Citrus Springs has a total area of 21.2 square miles (54.8 km^{2}); all land.

== Demographics ==
Historical population
Census	Pop.	Note	%±
1990	2,213		—
2000	4,157		87.8%
2010	8,622		107.4%
2020	10,246		18.8%
U.S. Decennial Census

=== 2020 census ===
As of the 2020 census, Citrus Springs had a population of 10,246. The median age was 44.7 years. 22.2% of residents were under the age of 18 and 25.4% of residents were 65 years of age or older. For every 100 females there were 93.0 males, and for every 100 females age 18 and over there were 90.4 males age 18 and over.

93.4% of residents lived in urban areas, while 6.6% lived in rural areas.

There were 4,035 households in Citrus Springs, of which 29.9% had children under the age of 18 living in them. Of all households, 53.3% were married-couple households, 14.9% were households with a male householder and no spouse or partner present, and 23.2% were households with a female householder and no spouse or partner present. About 22.7% of all households were made up of individuals and 13.8% had someone living alone who was 65 years of age or older.

There were 4,445 housing units, of which 9.2% were vacant. The homeowner vacancy rate was 2.9% and the rental vacancy rate was 8.2%.

Racial composition as of the 2020 census
Race	Number	Percent
White	8,497	82.9%
Black or African American	445	4.3%
American Indian and Alaska Native	44	0.4%
Asian	123	1.2%
Native Hawaiian and Other Pacific Islander	2	0.0%
Some other race	277	2.7%
Two or more races	858	8.4%
Hispanic or Latino (of any race)	1,148	11.2%

=== 2000 census ===
As of the 2000 census, there were 4,157 people, 1,834 households, and 1,333 families residing in the CDP. The population density was 195.4 inhabitants per square mile (75.4/km^{2}). There were 2,003 housing units at an average density of 94.2 units per square mile (36.4 units/km^{2}). The racial makeup of the CDP was 93.70% White, 2.24% African American, 0.31% Native American, 0.65% Asian, 0.07% Pacific Islander, 1.37% from other races, and 1.66% from two or more races. Hispanic or Latino of any race were 5.46% of the population.

There were 1,834 households, out of which 20.1% had children under the age of 18 living with them, 62.4% were married couples living together, 8.5% had a female householder with no husband present, and 27.3% were non-families. 23.3% of all households were made up of individuals, and 16.4% had someone living alone who was 65 years of age or older. The average household size was 2.25 and the average family size was 2.61.

In the CDP, the population was spread out, with 18.0% under the age of 18, 4.2% from 18 to 24, 18.6% from 25 to 44, 22.9% from 45 to 64, and 36.3% who were 65 years of age or older. The median age was 54 years. For every 100 females, there were 88.4 males. For every 100 females age 18 and over, there were 85.8 males.

The median income for a household in the CDP was $29,758, and the median income for a family was $35,000. Males had a median income of $27,143 versus $18,686 for females. The per capita income for the CDP was $16,845. About 5.0% of families and 7.8% of the population were below the poverty line, including 11.4% of those under age 18 and 4.1% of those age 65 or over.

== History ==
Citrus Springs was developed by the Mackle Brothers, prominent Florida real estate developers working under The Deltona Corporation to be used as a subdivision consisting of over 34,000 homesites. (Elkcam Boulevard, a prominent street in Citrus Springs, is "Mackle" spelled backwards.) The area currently has two elementary schools (Citrus Springs Elementary School and Central Ridge Elementary School, opened fall 2008) and one middle school (Citrus Springs Middle School). There are plans for an 80-acre (320,000 m^{2}) high school campus complete with public park, but construction is not planned in the near future.

Phosphate mining played a major part in the history of Citrus County until the end of World War II, when phosphate mining largely moved overseas. The first newspaper of Citrus County was called the Phosphate Times. Many abandoned mines exist in the Withlacoochee River basin, with a concentration of those within Citrus Springs. Some of those areas can be seen at one of Citrus Springs' two golf courses, El Diablo. Many of those mines were part of the Dunnellon Phosphate company, headed by Capt John L. Inglis, a veteran of the Civil War. Areas in northeastern Citrus Springs were part of a proposed but unbuilt portion of the Cross Florida Barge Canal to aid the transportation of the mineral.

The Withlacoochee State Trail, a 46-mile (74 km) bike riding trail which was converted from the railroad lines built in the early 1900s, runs through Citrus Springs, in places parallel to US 41.

== Education ==
The CDP is served by Citrus County Schools. Residents are divided between Citrus Springs Elementary and Central Ridge Elementary. All residents are zoned to Citrus Springs Middle School. Portions of the CDP are zoned to Citrus High School, Crystal River High School, and Lecanto High School.
