= Homosassa, Florida =

Census-designated place in Florida, United States

- Census-designated place
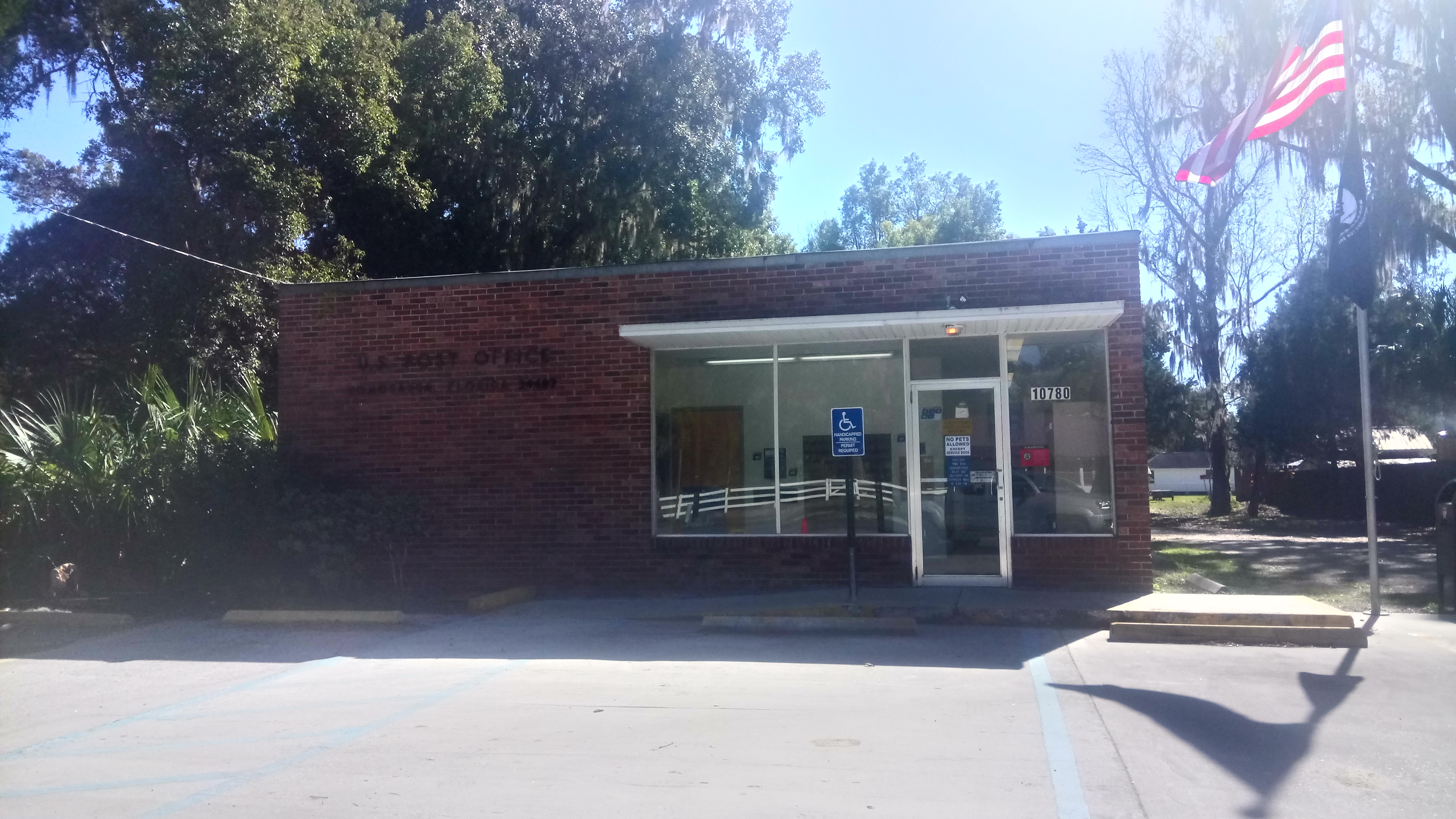
- Homosassa Post Office

- Location in Citrus County and the state of Florida
- Coordinates: 28°46′55″N 82°37′12″W
- Country: United States
- State: Florida
- County: Citrus

Area
  - Total: 8.33 sq mi (21.58 km^{2})
  - Land: 7.81 sq mi (20.23 km^{2})
  - Water: 0.52 sq mi (1.35 km^{2})
- Elevation: 3 ft (0.91 m)

Population (2020)
  - Total: 2,299
  - Density: 294.3/sq mi (113.64/km^{2})
- Time zone: UTC−5 (Eastern (EST))
  - Summer (DST): UTC−4 (EDT)
- ZIP codes: 34446, 34448, 34487
- Area code: 352
- FIPS code: 12-32375
- GNIS feature ID: 2402598
- Website: www.visitflorida.com/en-us/cities/homosassa.html

Homosassa (/ˌhoʊməˈsæsə/) is a census-designated place (CDP) in Citrus County, Florida, United States. The population was 2,299 at the 2020 census, down from 2,578 at the 2010 census. It is part of the Homosassa Springs, Florida Metropolitan Statistical Area.

== History ==
Homosassa is derived from a Seminole tribe Native American name meaning either "river of fishes" or "pepper ridge".

In 1851, David Levy Yulee established a 5,000-acre (20 km^{2}) sugar plantation on the Homosassa River, close to the current town of Homosassa. The plantation was worked by approximately 1,000 slaves, but Yulee was an absentee owner, spending most of his time in Fernandina. Among the crops raised were sugar cane, cotton, and citrus. The Yulee Groves were one of the first in Florida to grow sweet oranges budded from sour orange stock. The mill, which was steam-driven, operated from 1851 to 1864 and produced sugar, syrup, and molasses, the last of which was part of the rum-making process. After the Civil War ended in 1865, Yulee was imprisoned, the slaves were freed, and the site was abandoned. The remains of the plantation are preserved at the Yulee Sugar Mill Ruins Historic State Park.

== Wildlife ==
Homosassa is home to Homosassa Springs Wildlife State Park, which is often home to large numbers of "migratory" manatees, which frequent the area due to its springs and relatively warm waters. The park has been known to have Florida panthers, black bears, red wolves, alligators and flamingos. The park is home to Lu, a famous hippopotamus known for his performances in many movies. The park also hosts an underwater viewing platform, known as the "fish bowl", where visitors can see manatees and fish swimming in the large spring from which the Homosassa River begins. The Wildlife Park helps spread awareness about the dangers of boating around areas inhabited by manatees as well as the destructive effects of polluting the environment. The park is one of the few major attractions of the area, which has a large retiree population and a very low level of activity compared to major tourist regions of Florida. The Homosassa and Halls rivers run through the area, and it is fairly common to see manatees surface near the area's waterfront restaurants and bars.

Homosassa is considered one of the best places in the world to catch Atlantic tarpon by Sport Fishing Magazine.

== Geography ==
Homosassa is located in southwestern Citrus County, to the west of U.S. Routes 19 and 98 (Suncoast Boulevard). The CDP extends west on both sides of the Homosassa River to a network of marshes and islands that lead to the Gulf of Mexico. The original settlement of Homosassa is located on the south side of the Homosassa River, 3 miles (5 km) west of Homosassa Springs by either West Fishbowl Drive or West Yulee Drive.

According to the United States Census Bureau, the CDP has a total area of 8.3 square miles (21.5 km^{2}), of which 7.8 square miles (20.1 km^{2}) is land and 0.54 square miles (1.4 km^{2}), or 6.30%, is water.

== Demographics ==
Historical population
Census	Pop.	Note	%±
1990	2,113		—
2000	2,294		8.6%
2010	2,578		12.4%
2020	2,299		−10.8%
U.S. Decennial Census

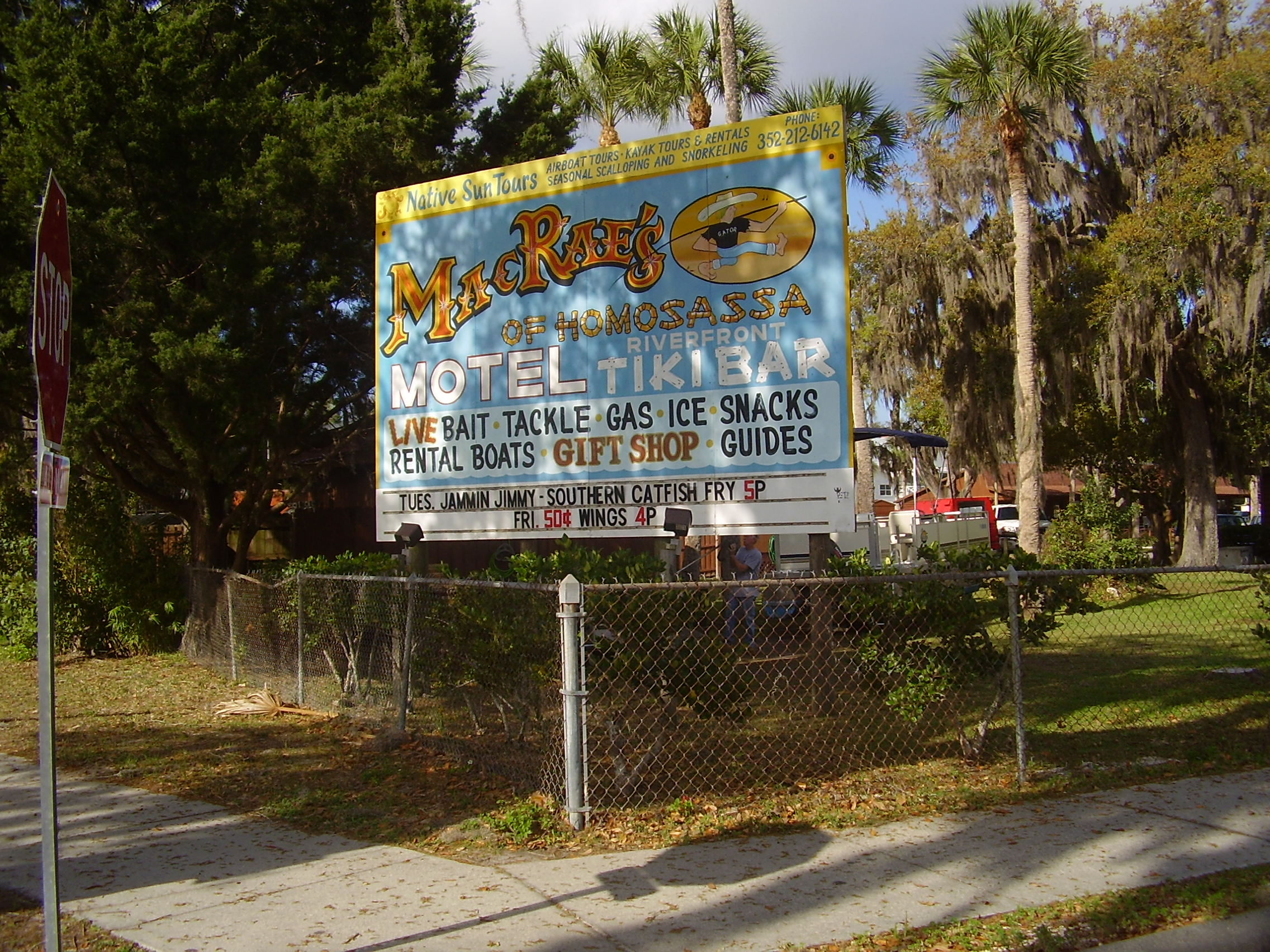
Homosassa McRae's Hotel

=== 2020 census ===
As of the 2020 census, Homosassa had a population of 2,299. The median age was 63.5 years. 8.5% of residents were under the age of 18 and 46.2% of residents were 65 years of age or older. For every 100 females there were 96.3 males, and for every 100 females age 18 and over there were 94.5 males age 18 and over.

48.0% of residents lived in urban areas, while 52.0% lived in rural areas.

There were 1,186 households in Homosassa, of which 9.9% had children under the age of 18 living in them. Of all households, 47.5% were married-couple households, 22.2% were households with a male householder and no spouse or partner present, and 22.3% were households with a female householder and no spouse or partner present. About 33.3% of all households were made up of individuals and 22.6% had someone living alone who was 65 years of age or older.

There were 1,958 housing units, of which 39.4% were vacant. The homeowner vacancy rate was 3.2% and the rental vacancy rate was 20.2%.

Racial composition as of the 2020 census
Race	Number	Percent
White	2,189	95.2%
Black or African American	0	0.0%
American Indian and Alaska Native	3	0.1%
Asian	11	0.5%
Native Hawaiian and Other Pacific Islander	0	0.0%
Some other race	8	0.3%
Two or more races	88	3.8%
Hispanic or Latino (of any race)	40	1.7%

=== 2000 census ===
As of the census of 2000, there were 2,294 people, 1,128 households, and 771 families residing in the CDP. The population density was 288.7 inhabitants per square mile (111.5/km^{2}). There were 1,602 housing units at an average density of 201.6 per square mile (77.8/km^{2}). The racial makeup of the CDP was 98.65% White, 0.04% African American, 0.35% Native American, 0.04% Asian, 0.04% from other races, and 0.87% from two or more races. Hispanic or Latino of any race were 1.05% of the population.

There were 1,128 households, out of which 12.0% had children under the age of 18 living with them, 61.8% were married couples living together, 3.5% had a female householder with no husband present, and 31.6% were non-families. 27.0% of all households were made up of individuals, and 15.3% had someone living alone who was 65 years of age or older. The average household size was 2.02 and the average family size was 2.38.

In the CDP, the population was spread out, with 10.6% under the age of 18, 3.3% from 18 to 24, 15.5% from 25 to 44, 35.4% from 45 to 64, and 35.1% who were 65 years of age or older. The median age was 58 years. For every 100 females, there were 100.2 males. For every 100 females age 18 and over, there were 100.0 males.

The median income for a household in the CDP was $38,696, and the median income for a family was $41,513. Males had a median income of $29,044 versus $21,755 for females. The per capita income for the CDP was $21,135. About 10.5% of families and 10.8% of the population were below the poverty line, including 17.3% of those under age 18 and 6.2% of those age 65 or over.

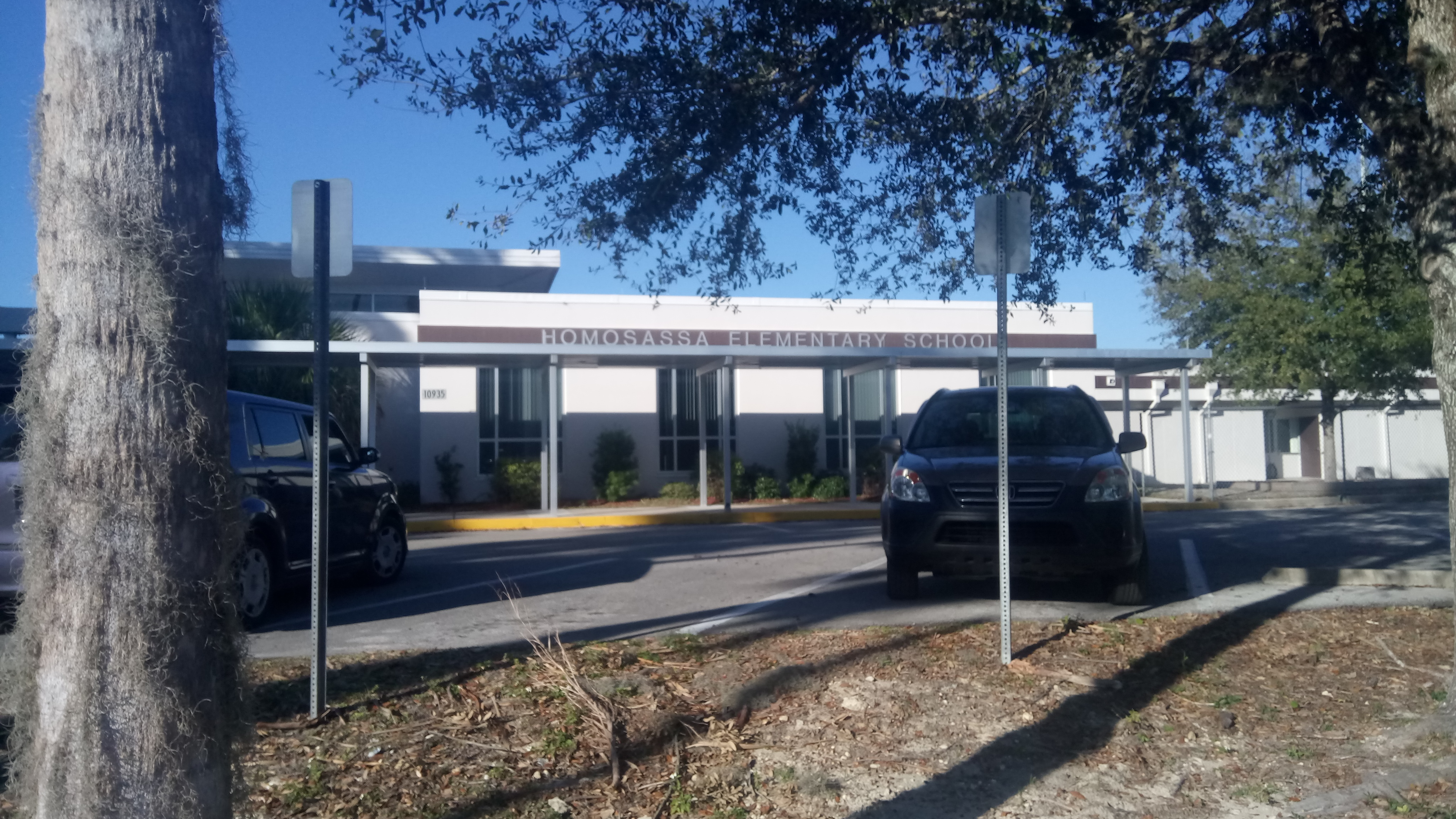
Homosassa Elementary School

== Education ==
The CDP is served by Citrus County Schools. Homosassa Elementary School is in the community. Residents are zoned to Homosassa Elementary, Crystal River Middle School in Crystal River, and Crystal River High School in Crystal River.

The nearest public library, the Homosassa Public Library of Citrus Libraries, located in Homosassa Springs.
