= Lecanto, Florida =

Census-designated place in Florida, US

- Census-designated place
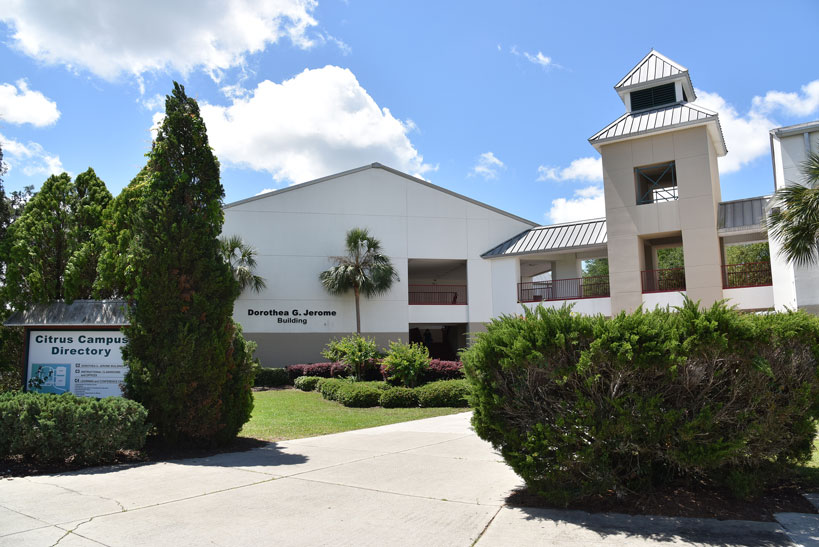
- Citrus Campus of the College of Central Florida

- Location in Citrus County and the state of Florida
- Coordinates: 28°52′02″N 82°29′40″W
- Country: United States
- State: Florida
- County: Citrus

Area
  - Total: 26.94 sq mi (69.77 km^{2})
  - Land: 26.93 sq mi (69.75 km^{2})
  - Water: 0.0077 sq mi (0.02 km^{2})
- Elevation: 62 ft (19 m)

Population (2020)
  - Total: 6,301
  - Density: 234.0/sq mi (90.34/km^{2})
- Time zone: UTC-5 (Eastern (EST))
  - Summer (DST): UTC-4 (EDT)
- ZIP codes: 34460-34461
- Area code: 352
- FIPS code: 12-39825
- GNIS feature ID: 2403224

Lecanto is an unincorporated community and census-designated place (CDP) in Citrus County, Florida, United States. As of the 2020 census it had a population of 6,301, up from 5,882 at the 2010 census. It is part of the Homosassa Springs, Florida Metropolitan Statistical Area. It is home to several county government facilities including the Citrus County Sheriff's Office and the Citrus Campus of the College of Central Florida.

== Geography ==
Lecanto is located at the geographic center of Citrus County. State Road 44 (Gulf to Lake Highway) runs through the center of the CDP, leading west 7 miles (11 km) to Crystal River and east 10 miles (16 km) to Inverness, the county seat.

According to the United States Census Bureau, the CDP has a total area of 26.9 square miles (69.8 km^{2}), of which 0.008 square miles (0.02 km^{2}), or 0.03%, is water.

== Demographics ==
Historical population
Census	Pop.	Note	%±
1990	1,243		—
2000	5,161		315.2%
2010	5,882		14.0%
2020	6,301		7.1%

=== 2020 census ===
As of the 2020 census, Lecanto had a population of 6,301. The median age was 52.0 years. 15.1% of residents were under the age of 18 and 30.3% of residents were 65 years of age or older. For every 100 females there were 104.6 males, and for every 100 females age 18 and over there were 105.0 males age 18 and over.

33.0% of residents lived in urban areas, while 67.0% lived in rural areas.

There were 2,321 households in Lecanto, of which 19.9% had children under the age of 18 living in them. Of all households, 50.7% were married-couple households, 18.5% were households with a male householder and no spouse or partner present, and 24.3% were households with a female householder and no spouse or partner present. About 29.0% of all households were made up of individuals and 18.0% had someone living alone who was 65 years of age or older.

There were 2,562 housing units, of which 9.4% were vacant. The homeowner vacancy rate was 3.3% and the rental vacancy rate was 8.2%.

Racial composition as of the 2020 census
Race	Number	Percent
White	5,406	85.8%
Black or African American	339	5.4%
American Indian and Alaska Native	14	0.2%
Asian	80	1.3%
Native Hawaiian and Other Pacific Islander	2	0.0%
Some other race	92	1.5%
Two or more races	368	5.8%
Hispanic or Latino (of any race)	349	5.5%

=== 2000 census ===
At the 2000 census there were 5,161 people, 1,861 households, and 1,369 families in the CDP. The population density was 190.8 inhabitants per square mile (73.7/km^{2}). There were 2,095 housing units at an average density of 77.5 per square mile (29.9/km^{2}). The racial makup of the CDP was 93.88% White, 2.96% African American, 0.76% Native American, 0.76% Asian, 0.02% Pacific Islander, 0.43% from other races, and 1.20% from two or more races. Hispanic or Latino of any race were 2.71%.

Of the 1,861 households 25.8% had children under the age of 18 living with them, 61.8% were married couples living together, 7.9% had a female householder with no husband present, and 26.4% were non-families. 22.0% of households were one person and 11.7% were one person aged 65 or older. The average household size was 2.43 and the average family size was 2.81.

The age distribution was 20.5% under the age of 18, 6.3% from 18 to 24, 23.4% from 25 to 44, 27.1% from 45 to 64, and 22.6% 65 or older. The median age was 45 years. For every 100 females, there were 105.6 males. For every 100 females age 18 and over, there were 101.4 males. The median household income was $40,826 and the median family income was $46,987. Males had a median income of $30,625 versus $27,296 for females. The per capita income for the CDP was $20,625. About 5.3% of families and 9.1% of the population were below the poverty line, including 13.8% of those under age 18 and 4.8% of those age 65 or over.

Lecanto is the site of the privately operated Citrus County Detention Facility, which holds a maximum of 760 prisoners of the county, of the federal government, and prisoners from the Virgin Islands.

== Education ==
The CDP is served by Citrus County Schools. Elementary schools serving sections of the CDP include Lecanto, Forest Ridge, Rock Crusher, and Hernando. Lecanto Middle School and Lecanto High School also serve the CDP. The College of Central Florida's Citrus Campus was built in Lecanto in 1996.

== Public transportation ==
Citrus County Transit has its headquarters in Lecanto and runs one flex-route service in the area.
