= Citrus County School District =

School district in Florida, United States

Address
- 1007 W. Main Street Inverness, Citrus County, Florida, 34450-4698; United States
- Coordinates: 28.835863°N 82.342696°W

District information
- Grades: Pre-kindergarten - 12
- Superintendent: Scott Herbert
- NCES District ID: 1200270
- Enrollment: 15,661 (2019-2020)

Other information
- Telephone: (352) 726-1931
- Website: https://www.citrusschools.org/

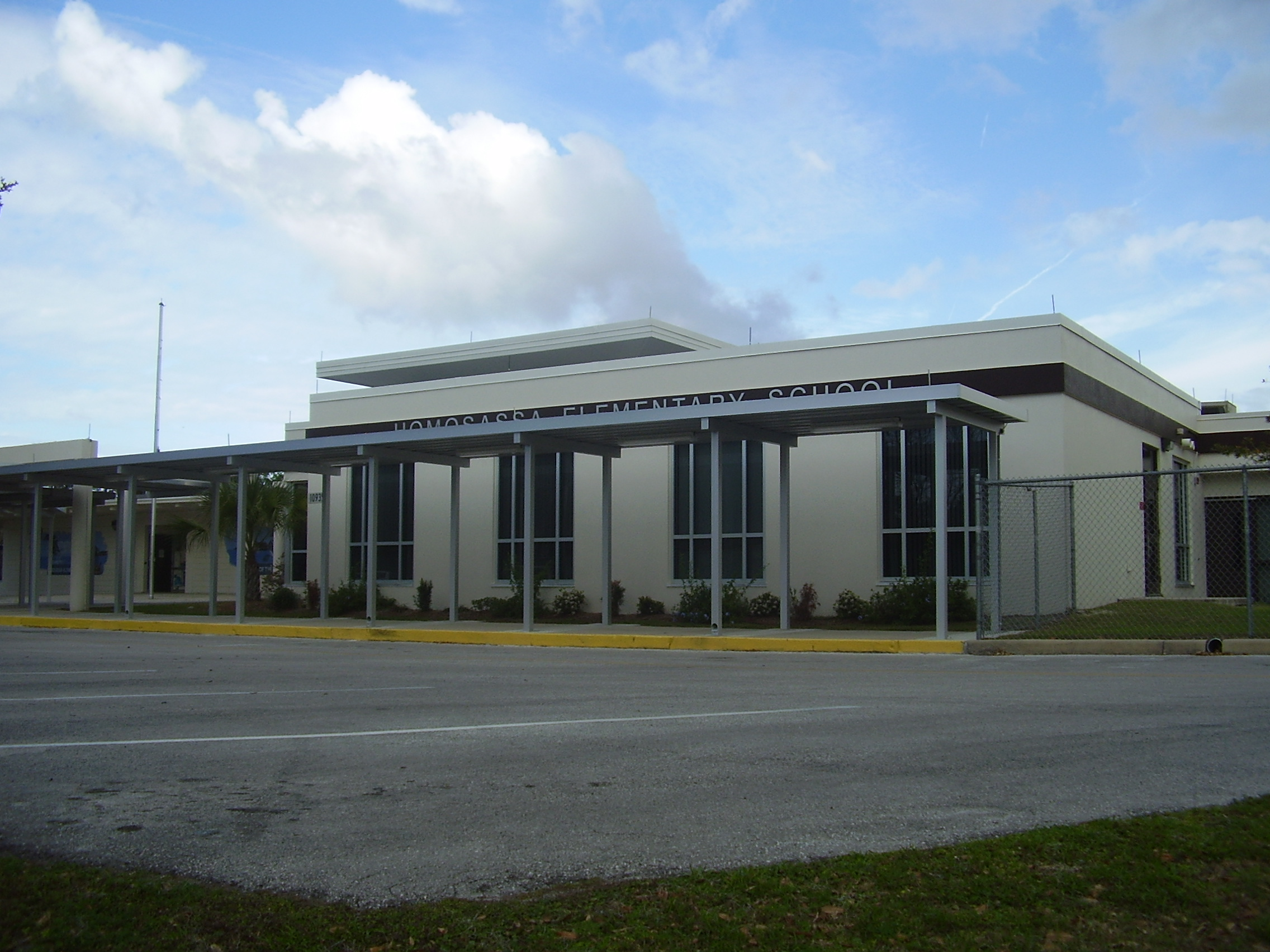
Homosassa Elementary School

The Citrus County School District is the public school district of Citrus County, Florida. The district serves the cities of Crystal River and Inverness, and communities such as Beverly Hills, Citrus Springs, Floral City, Hernando, Holder, Homosassa, and Lecanto. The district is composed of eleven elementary schools, four middle schools, three high schools, a charter school, and two alternative schools.

== Personnel ==
- Scott Herbert, Superintendent
- Jennifer Greco, Assistant Superintendent
- Amy Crowell, Chief Academic Officer
- Thomas Kennedy, School Board Member, District No. 1
- Kenneth Frink, School Board Member, District No. 2
- Douglas Dodd, School Board Member, District No. 3
- Sandy Counts, School Board Member, District No. 4
- Joseph Faherty, School Board Member, District No. 5

== Schools ==
=== Elementary schools ===
- Central Ridge Elementary
- Citrus Springs Elementary
- Crystal River Primary
- Floral City Elementary
- Forest Ridge Elementary
- Hernando Elementary
- Homosassa Elementary
- Inverness Primary
- Lecanto Primary
- Pleasant Grove Elementary
- Rock Crusher Elementary

=== Middle schools ===
- Citrus Springs Middle School (Falcon)
- Crystal River Middle School (Bearcat)
- Inverness Middle School (Charger)
- Lecanto Middle School (Panther)

=== High schools ===
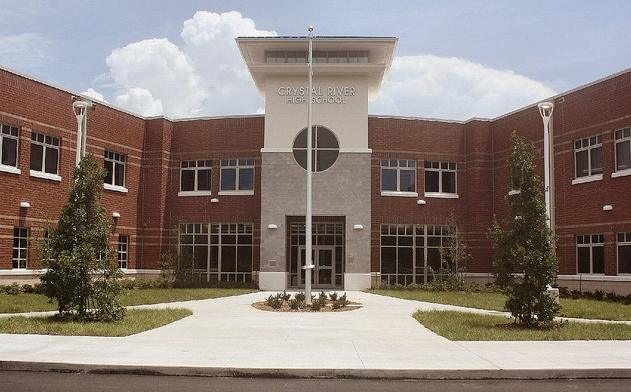
Crystal River High School

- Citrus High School (Hurricane)
- Crystal River High School (Pirate)
- Lecanto High School (Panther)

=== Charter school ===
- Academy of Environmental Science

=== Colleges ===
- College of Central Florida (Citrus Campus)
- Withlacoochee Technical College

=== Alternative schools ===
- CREST, Citrus Resource for Exceptional Student Transition (previously known as Lakeview)
- Renaissance Center
