= Homosassa Springs, Florida =

Census-designated place in Florida, United States

- Census-designated place
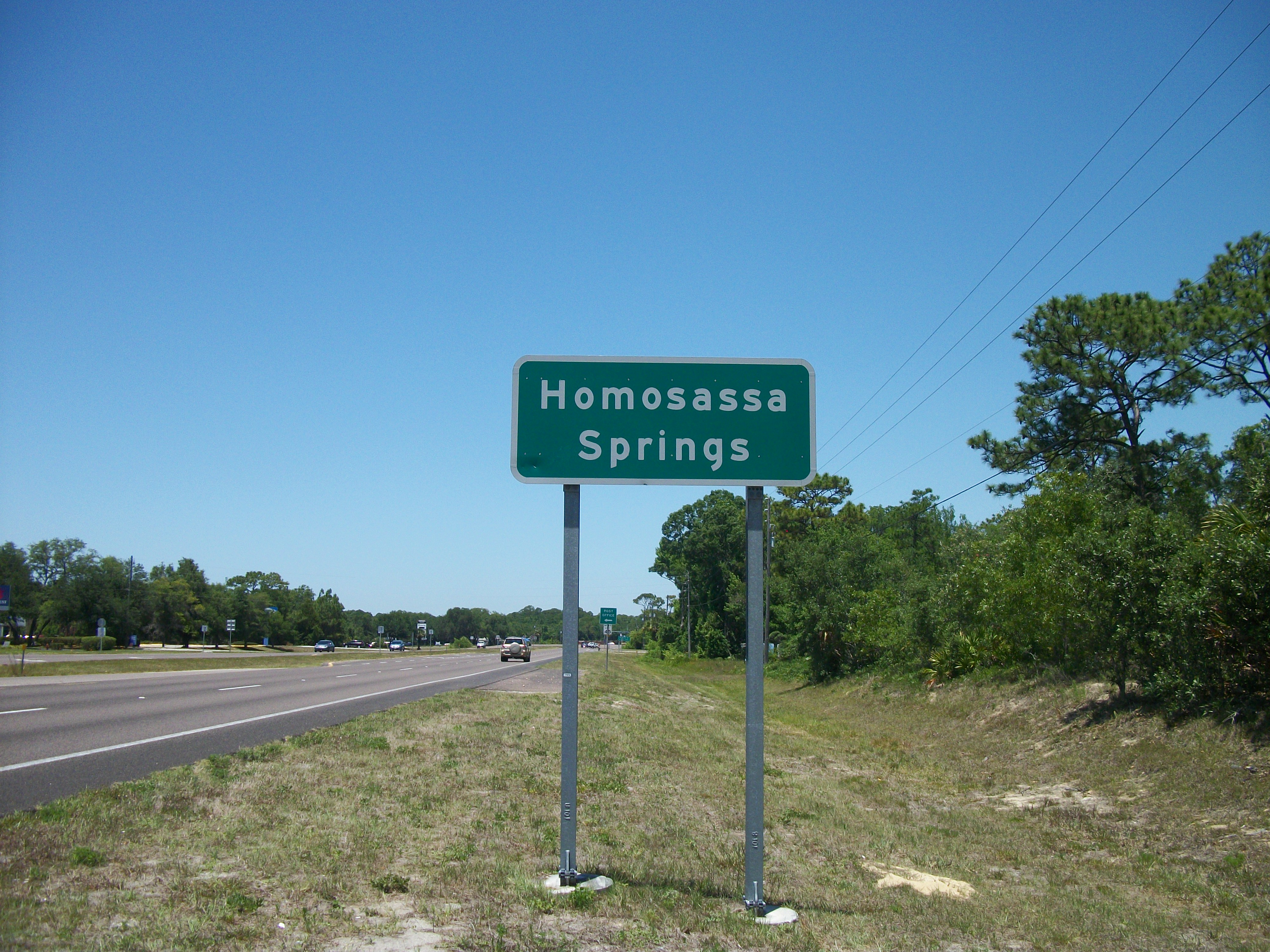
- Northbound US 19-98 as it enters Homosassa Springs

- Location in Citrus County and the state of Florida
- Coordinates: 28°48′06″N 82°31′20″W
- Country: United States
- State: Florida
- County: Citrus

Area
  - Total: 25.18 sq mi (65.21 km^{2})
  - Land: 25.17 sq mi (65.18 km^{2})
  - Water: 0.012 sq mi (0.03 km^{2})
- Elevation: 10 ft (3.0 m)

Population (2020)
  - Total: 14,283
  - Density: 567.5/sq mi (219.12/km^{2})
- Time zone: UTC-5 (Eastern (EST))
  - Summer (DST): UTC-4 (EDT)
- ZIP Code: 34447
- Area code: 352
- FIPS code: 12-32400
- GNIS feature ID: 2402599

Homosassa Springs is an unincorporated community and census-designated place (CDP) in Citrus County, Florida, United States. The population was 14,283 as of 2020, up from 13,791 at the 2010 census. Homosassa Springs is the principal community of the Homosassa Springs, Florida, Metropolitan Statistical Area.

The name derives from the warm spring located in Homosassa Springs Wildlife State Park that attracts manatees to the area.

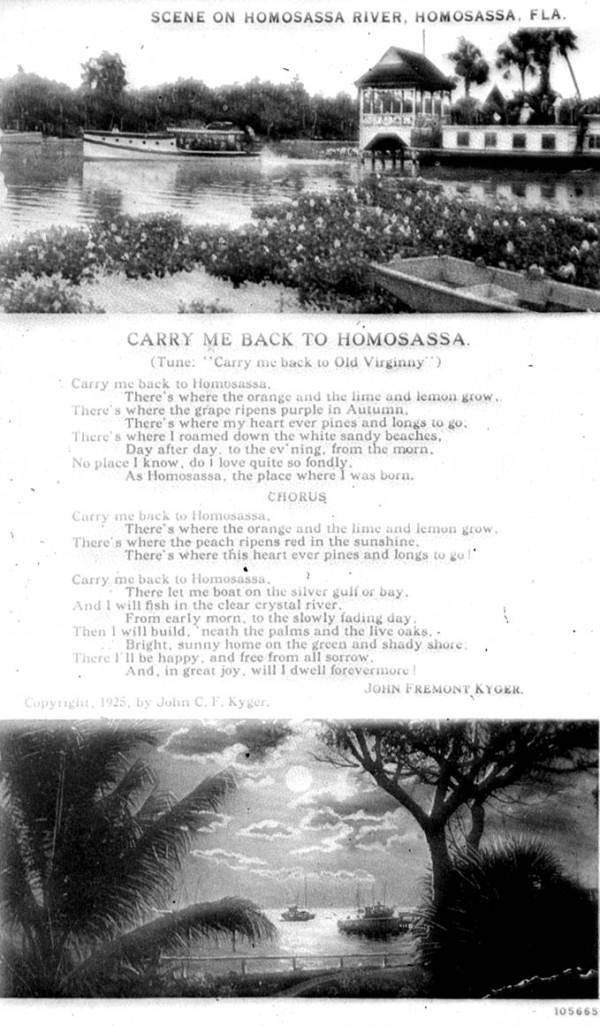
Scene on the Homosassa River - Homosassa Springs, Florida, 1925

== Geography and climate ==
Homosassa Springs is located in southern Citrus County. The CDP is to the east of U.S. Routes 19 and 98 (Suncoast Boulevard); the CDP of Homosassa is located to the west of the highway, as is Homosassa Springs Wildlife State Park. Homosassa Springs is bordered to the northwest by the city of Crystal River, to the east by Lecanto, and to the south by Sugarmill Woods.

According to the United States Census Bureau, the CDP has a total area of 25.1 square miles (65.1 km^{2}), of which 0.02 square mile (0.04 km^{2}), or 0.06%, is covered by water.

Climate data for Homosassa Springs, Florida
Month	Jan	Feb	Mar	Apr	May	Jun	Jul	Aug	Sep	Oct	Nov	Dec	Year
Record high °F (°C)	85 (29)	88 (31)	91 (33)	93 (34)	98 (37)	99 (37)	97 (36)	98 (37)	96 (36)	94 (34)	90 (32)	86 (30)	99 (37)
Mean daily maximum °F (°C)	70.8 (21.6)	73.4 (23.0)	77.6 (25.3)	82.6 (28.1)	88.4 (31.3)	90.8 (32.7)	91.6 (33.1)	91.5 (33.1)	89.9 (32.2)	85.0 (29.4)	78.7 (25.9)	72.6 (22.6)	82.7 (28.2)
Mean daily minimum °F (°C)	45.1 (7.3)	47.9 (8.8)	52.2 (11.2)	56.7 (13.7)	63.8 (17.7)	70.3 (21.3)	72.0 (22.2)	72.1 (22.3)	70.0 (21.1)	62.8 (17.1)	54.4 (12.4)	47.6 (8.7)	59.6 (15.3)
Record low °F (°C)	21 (−6)	24 (−4)	29 (−2)	40 (4)	49 (9)	53 (12)	63 (17)	67 (19)	57 (14)	40 (4)	23 (−5)	18 (−8)	18 (−8)
Average precipitation inches (mm)	3.56 (90)	3.05 (77)	4.17 (106)	2.54 (65)	3.23 (82)	6.50 (165)	7.60 (193)	7.78 (198)	6.40 (163)	2.51 (64)	2.32 (59)	2.64 (67)	52.30 (1,328)
Source 1:
Source 2:

== Demographics ==
Historical population
Census	Pop.	Note	%±
1990	6,271		—
2000	12,458		98.7%
2010	13,791		10.7%
2020	14,283		3.6%

=== 2020 census ===
As of the 2020 census, Homosassa Springs had a population of 14,283. The median age was 53.6 years. 16.3% of residents were under the age of 18 and 29.8% of residents were 65 years of age or older. For every 100 females there were 99.0 males, and for every 100 females age 18 and over there were 97.3 males age 18 and over.

89.8% of residents lived in urban areas, while 10.2% lived in rural areas.

There were 6,268 households in Homosassa Springs, of which 20.2% had children under the age of 18 living in them. Of all households, 42.1% were married-couple households, 21.0% were households with a male householder and no spouse or partner present, and 26.1% were households with a female householder and no spouse or partner present. About 30.1% of all households were made up of individuals and 17.2% had someone living alone who was 65 years of age or older.

There were 7,470 housing units, of which 16.1% were vacant. The homeowner vacancy rate was 2.6% and the rental vacancy rate was 6.5%.

Racial composition as of the 2020 census
Race	Number	Percent
White	12,955	90.7%
Black or African American	131	0.9%
American Indian and Alaska Native	90	0.6%
Asian	111	0.8%
Native Hawaiian and Other Pacific Islander	5	0.0%
Some other race	139	1.0%
Two or more races	852	6.0%
Hispanic or Latino (of any race)	677	4.7%

=== Demographic estimates ===
According to U.S. Census Bureau QuickFacts data, 5.7% of the population was under 5 years old, 51.1% of the population was female, 2.8% of the population was foreign born, and there were 1,594 veterans living in Homosassa Springs.

The median value of owner-occupied housing units was $86,500 and the median gross rent was $750.

86.6% of the population 25 years and older had a high school diploma or higher, and 7.7% of the population 25 years and older had a bachelor's degree or higher.

90.2% of households had a computer and 81.2% of households had a broadband internet subscription.

== Education ==
Homosassa Springs is served by Citrus County School District. Residents are divided between Homosassa Elementary, Lecanto Elementary, and Rock Crusher Elementary; Crystal River Middle School and Lecanto Middle School; and Crystal River High School and Lecanto High School.

The Homosassa Public Library of Citrus Libraries is located in Homosassa Springs.

== Notable person ==
- Dazzy Vance, baseball pitcher, Hall of Fame inductee
