= Crystal River, Florida =

City in Florida, United States

- City
- City of Crystal River
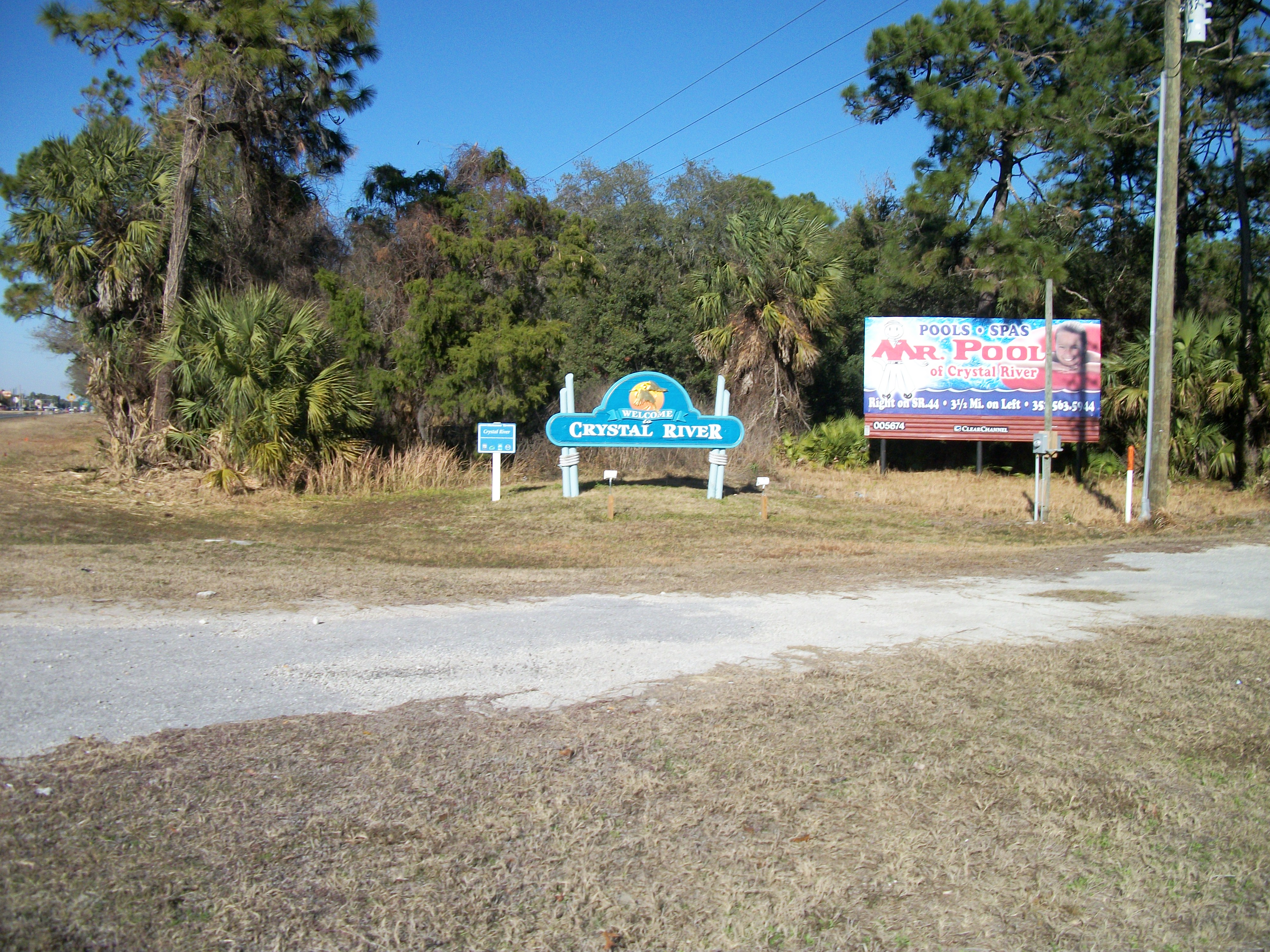
- US 19-US 98 enters Crystal River

- Seal
- Nickname: Manatee Haven
- Motto(s): "Gem of the Nature Coast" "Home of the Manatee"
- Location in Citrus County and the state of Florida
- Coordinates: 28°53′02″N 82°35′37″W
- Country: United States
- State: Florida
- County: Citrus
- Settled: c. Mid-1800s
- Incorporated (town): 1903
- Incorporated (city): July 3, 1923
- Named for: Crystal River

Government
  - Type: Council-Manager
  - Mayor: Joe Meek
  - Vice Mayor: Chris Ensing
  - Council Members: Mindi Hastings, Gabrielle Satchell, and Robert Holmes
  - City Manager: Audra Curts-Whann
  - City Clerk: Mia Fink

Area
  - Total: 8.13 sq mi (21.06 km^{2})
  - Land: 7.49 sq mi (19.39 km^{2})
  - Water: 0.64 sq mi (1.67 km^{2})
- Elevation: 0 ft (0 m)

Population (2020)
  - Total: 3,396
  - Density: 453.7/sq mi (175.17/km^{2})
- Time zone: UTC-5 (Eastern (EST))
  - Summer (DST): UTC-4 (EDT)
- ZIP codes: 34423, 34428, 34429
- Area code: 352
- FIPS code: 12-15775
- GNIS feature ID: 2404164
- Website: www.crystalriverfl.org

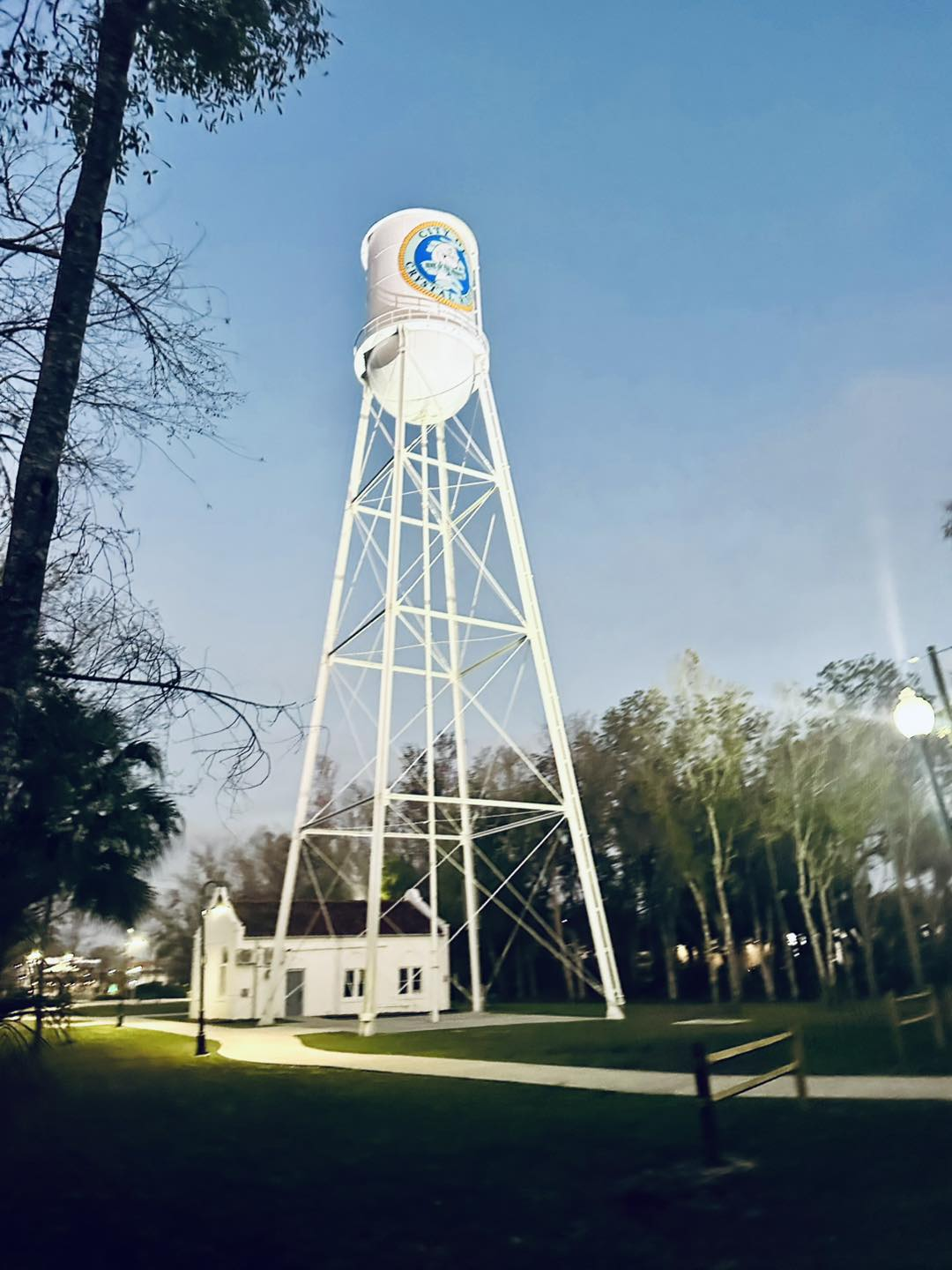
Crystal River's Water Tower

Crystal River is a city in Citrus County, Florida, United States. The population was 3,396 in the 2020 census, up from 3,108 at the 2010 census.

It is part of the Homosassa Springs, Florida Metropolitan Statistical Area. Crystal River Preserve State Park is located nearby, and Crystal River Archaeological State Park is located in the city's northwest side.

== Geography ==
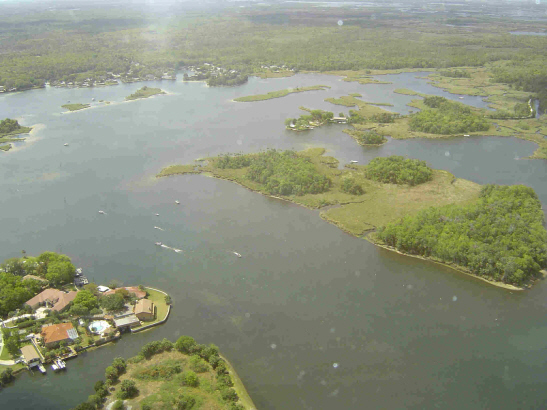
Kings Bay is fed by a springs system; it is connected to the Gulf of Mexico by the Crystal River.

Crystal River is located northwest of the center of Citrus County on the northeast side of Kings Bay and the Crystal River, an inlet of the Gulf of Mexico. U.S. Routes 19 and 98 pass through the center of the city, leading south 7 miles (11 km) to Homosassa Springs and north 46 miles (74 km) to Chiefland. State Road 44 leads east from Crystal River 17 miles (27 km) to Inverness, the Citrus County seat.

According to the United States Census Bureau, the city of Crystal River has a total area of 6.8 square miles (17.7 km^{2}), of which 6.2 square miles (16.0 km^{2}) is land and 0.66 square miles (1.7 km^{2}) 9.35% is water.

Crystal River is at the heart of the Nature Coast of Florida. The city is situated around Kings Bay, which is spring-fed so it keeps a constant 72 °F (22 °C) temperature year-round. A cluster of 50 springs designated as a first-magnitude system feeds Kings Bay. A first-magnitude system discharges 100 cubic feet or more of water per second, which equals about 64 million gallons of water per day. Because of this discharge amount, the Crystal River Springs group is the second largest springs group in Florida, the first being Wakulla Springs in Wakulla County near Tallahassee. Kings Bay can be home to over 400 manatees during the winter when the water temperature in the Gulf of Mexico cools, and is the only place in the United States where people can legally interact with them in their natural conditions without that interaction being viewed as harassment by law enforcement agencies. Tourism based on watching and swimming with manatees is the fastest growing contribution to the local economy.

=== Climate ===
The Town of Ponce Inlet is part of the humid subtropical climate zone with a Köppen Climate Classification of "Cfa" (C = mild temperate, f = fully humid, and a = hot summer).

== History ==
In the Pleistocene era, the land on which Crystal River is located was vastly different from today. The west coast of Florida is thought to have extended an additional 50 to 60 miles (80 to 97 km) into the Gulf of Mexico. During excavations for the Crystal River Nuclear Plant in 1969, scientists discovered rhinoceros and mastodon bones, as well as the shells of an extremely large armadillo and a large land tortoise.

Around 500 BCE mound-building Native Americans (possibly Deptford culture) built a settlement along the Crystal River, which in the present day is the Crystal River Archaeological State Park. It was abandoned prior to European colonization for unknown reasons. The Native American name for Crystal River was Weewahi Iaca.

Following the Second Seminole War, settlers were encouraged into the area due to the passing of the Armed Occupation Act of 1842 by the United States federal government. Twenty-two men filed for patents for land in Crystal River. By the mid-1800s, families began to settle in the Crystal River area.

Mail was delivered by horse and buggy, and a stagecoach came from Ocala (Fort King) to Crystal River, stopping at the Stage Stand, which today is the Stage Stand Cemetery in Homosassa.

While no land battles were fought in the Crystal River area during the Civil War, there were many instances of skirmishes on the water directly off the coast of the Crystal and Homosassa rivers, as well as near Hickory Island in Yankeetown. By the time of the Civil War, Florida was an important source and supplier of food and other goods such as beef, pork, fish, corn, sugar, cotton, naval stores and salt. The Union was aware of this, and soon after the war began, the Union Navy blockaded the entire coast of Florida.

Following the Civil War, Crystal River grew. People from states to the north began to arrive, attracted by the area's mild climate and the potential of becoming wealthy growing citrus fruits. Early settlers to the area had found wild citrus trees growing in abundance, thanks in part to the Spanish explorers who had brought oranges with them on their ships and had discarded the seeds in the new world. This gave rise to the planting of citrus groves. The "Big Freeze" of 1894–1895 destroyed most of the citrus groves in the county.

A very early industry in the area was the turpentine business. Many of the barges during the Civil War blockade had been carrying turpentine, likely from the turpentine still of William Turner, who resided in Red Level. Other early industry in the Crystal River area included cedar mills. In 1882, James Williams moved his cedar mill to Crystal River, and began operating on King's Bay. The mill produced pencil boards, which were then shipped to Jersey City, New Jersey, by ship, and later on by train. The Dixon Cedar Mill was one of the largest industries in Crystal River, providing employment to many in the area, including women and African Americans.

Crystal River had been part of Hernando County since its inception in 1843. In 1844, the county name changed from "Hernando" to "Benton", in honor of Senator Thomas Hart Benton who had sponsored the Armed Occupation Act of 1842, which had brought settlers to the area. The county name returned to Hernando in 1850.

By the late 1800s, the area along the west side of the county was growing rapidly, and the citizens of the area began to see a need for a new county with a county seat that was easier to reach. In 1887, Hernando County was divided into three parts: Pasco County, Hernando County, and Citrus County. The town of Mannfield was named the temporary county seat for two years. Mannfield was chosen as it was in the geographic center of the new county and was more accessible to citizens. The site for the eventual county seat, Inverness, was decided by a vote in 1891.

Phosphate was discovered in 1889 in the east side of Citrus County, and the phosphate industry grew rapidly. Historians have claimed it to be "one of the richest phosphate deposits in the world." The phosphate industry would boom in Crystal River and Citrus County until 1914, when it could no longer be shipped due to World War I.

In 1888, the railroad reached Crystal River. The arrival of the railroad proved to be a boon; it provided an easier way to ship and receive goods. It was also an easier way for tourists to travel in and out of the city. Sport fishing became a draw for many wealthy northerners. In the early 1990s, Arctic Air of America Inc. moved to Crystal River.

It was officially incorporated as the Town of Crystal River in 1903, and the municipality officially incorporated as the City of Crystal River on July 3, 1923.

Crystal River Mall opened north of the center of town in 1990, which is now closed down.

In 2005, there was a movement to dissolve the city which did not succeed, and the city has since grown by municipal annexation.

== Demographics ==
Historical population
Census	Pop.	Note	%±
1890	208		—
1910	663		—
1920	944		42.4%
1930	869		−7.9%
1940	927		6.7%
1950	1,026		10.7%
1960	1,423		38.7%
1970	1,696		19.2%
1980	2,778		63.8%
1990	4,044		45.6%
2000	3,485		−13.8%
2010	3,108		−10.8%
2020	3,396		9.3%
U.S. Decennial Census

=== Racial and ethnic composition ===
Crystal River racial composition (Hispanics excluded from racial categories) (NH = Non-Hispanic)
Race	Pop 2010	Pop 2020	% 2010	% 2020
White (NH)	2,592	2,780	83.40%	81.86%
Black or African American (NH)	231	239	7.43%	7.04%
Native American or Alaska Native (NH)	8	13	0.26%	0.38%
Asian (NH)	64	44	2.06%	1.30%
Pacific Islander or Native Hawaiian (NH)	3	1	0.10%	0.03%
Some other race (NH)	0	19	0.00%	0.56%
Two or more races/Multiracial (NH)	49	134	1.58%	3.95%
Hispanic or Latino (any race)	161	166	5.18%	4.89%
Total	3,108	3,396		

=== 2020 census ===
As of the 2020 census, Crystal River had a population of 3,396. The median age was 59.8 years. 13.6% of residents were under the age of 18 and 39.5% of residents were 65 years of age or older. For every 100 females there were 85.4 males, and for every 100 females age 18 and over there were 82.7 males age 18 and over.

As of 2020, 97.8% of residents lived in urban areas, while 2.2% lived in rural areas.

In 2020, there were 1,587 households in Crystal River, of which 17.6% had children under the age of 18 living in them. Of all households, 35.8% were married-couple households, 21.5% were households with a male householder and no spouse or partner present, and 35.5% were households with a female householder and no spouse or partner present. About 38.9% of all households were made up of individuals and 21.5% had someone living alone who was 65 years of age or older.

In 2020, there were 2,176 housing units, of which 27.1% were vacant. The homeowner vacancy rate was 4.9% and the rental vacancy rate was 10.7%.

The 2020 American Community Survey 5-year estimates reported 744 families residing in the city.

=== 2010 census ===
As of the 2010 United States census, there were 3,108 people, 1,472 households, and 835 families residing in the city.

In 2010, the population density was 455.19 inhabitants per square mile (175.75/km^{2}). There were 2,036 housing units at an average density of 343.4 units per square mile (132.6 units/km^{2}).

In 2010, there were 1,472 households, out of which 18% had children under the age of 18 living with them, 43.0% were married couples living together, 9.6% had a female householder with no husband present, and 43.3% were non-families. 56.7% of all households were made up of individuals, and 19.6% had someone living alone who was 65 years of age or older. The average household size was 2.06 and the average family size was 2.61.

In 2010, in the city, the population was spread out, with 15.9% under the age of 18, 3.7% from 18 to 24, 15.7% from 25 to 44, 31% from 45 to 64, and 33.9% who were 65 years of age or older. The median age was 56 years. The population was composed of 1,477 males and 1,631 females.

=== 2000 census ===
As of the census of 2000, there were 3,485 people, 1,498 households, and 927 families residing in the city. The population density was 236.1 people/km^{2} (611 people/mi^{2}). There were 1,956 housing units at an average density of 132.5 units/km^{2} (343 units/mi^{2}). The racial makeup of the city was 83.76% White, 12.88% Black or African American, 0.40% Native American, 1.32% Asian, 0.06% Pacific Islander, 0.46% from other races, and 1.12% from two or more races. 3.04% of the population were Hispanic or Latino of any race.

In 2000, there were 1,498 households out of which 21.8% had children under the age of 18 living with them, 48.0% were married couples living together, 10.5% had a female householder with no husband present, and 38.1% were non-families. 32.0% of all households were made up of individuals and 13.0% had someone living alone who was 65 years of age or older. The average household size was 2.16 and the average family size was 2.68.

In 2000, in the city the population was spread out with 19.0% under the age of 18, 5.2% from 18 to 24, 20.9% from 25 to 44, 27.2% from 45 to 64, and 27.6% who were 65 years of age or older. The median age was 48 years. For every 100 females there were 91.8 males. For every 100 females age 18 and over, there were 87.8 males.

In 2000, the median income for a household in the city was $37,207, and the median income for a family was $47,250. Males had a median income of $39,357 versus $25,417 for females. The per capita income for the city was $25,866. About 3.5% of families and 9.9% of the population were below the poverty line, including 12.4% of those under age 18 and 9.5% of those age 65 or over.

== Government ==
Crystal River uses a city council with five elected members, including the mayor. As of March 2024, the current mayor of Crystal River is Joe Meek.

== Education ==
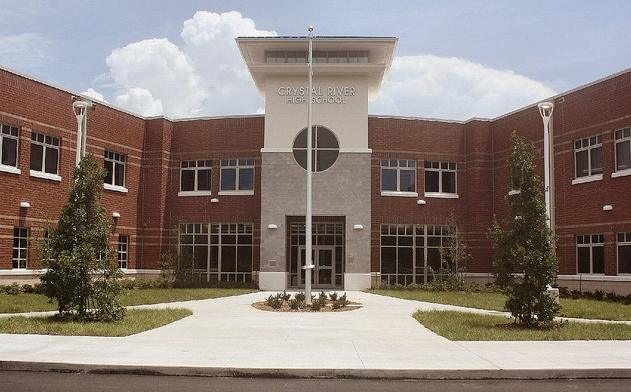
Crystal River High School

The city is served by Citrus County Schools. Residents are zoned to Crystal River Primary [elementary] School, Crystal River Middle School, and Crystal River High School.

The Coastal Region Library of Citrus Libraries is in Crystal River.

== Healthcare ==
The only hospital that operates in Crystal River is TGH Crystal River.

== Notable people ==
- Mike Hampton, professional MLB player
- Rob Hermann, American Greco-Roman wrestler and coach
- May Mann Jennings, former First Lady of Florida and civic activist
- Gerald "Jerry" Wood Merrick, songwriter
- Jack Roland Murphy, jewel thief
- Wendi Richter, professional wrestler
