= Royal Palm State Park =

Former state park in Florida, United States

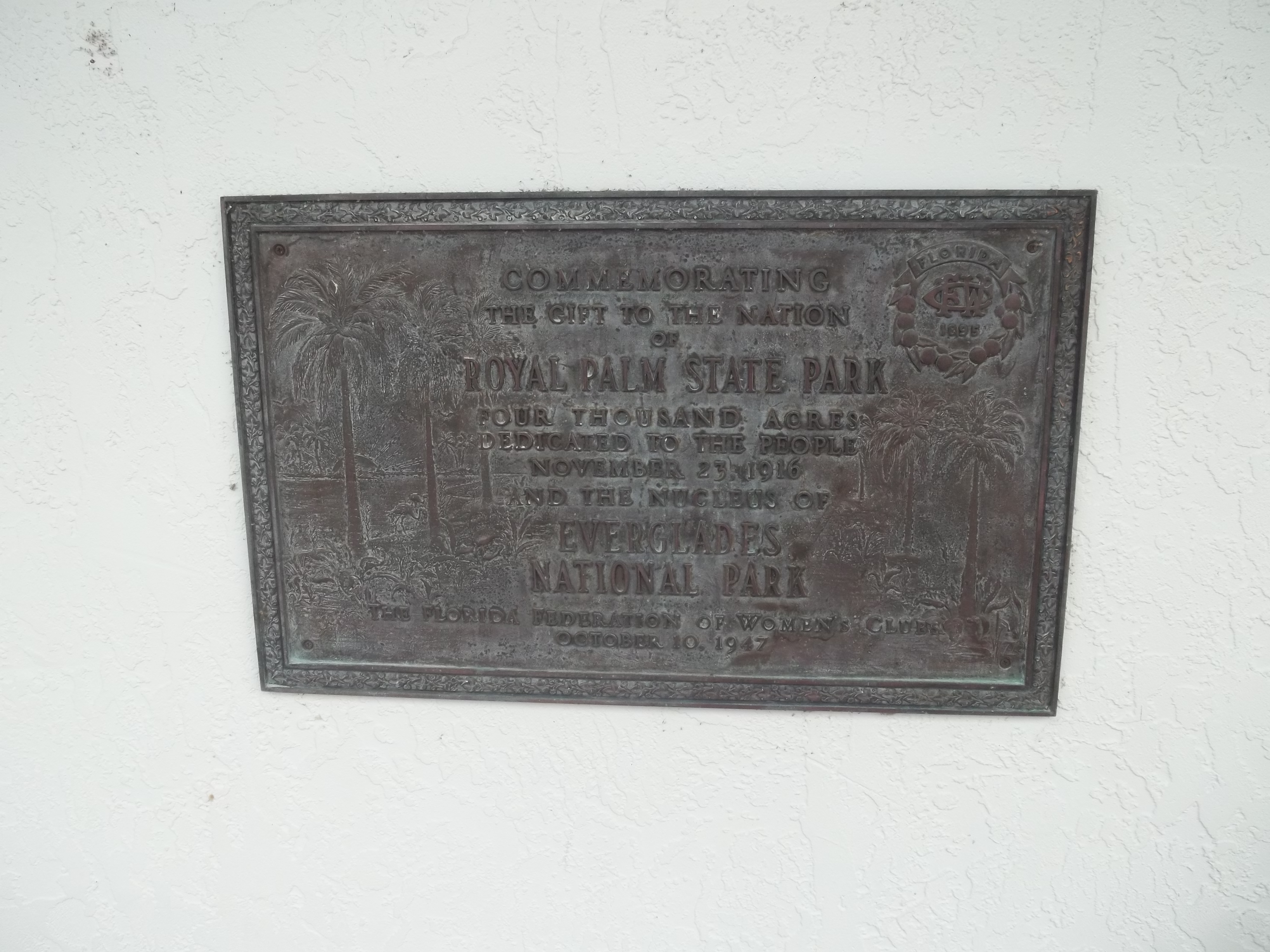
- Historic State Park

- Location within Florida Location within the United States
- Interactive map of Royal Palm State Park
- Location: Miami-Dade County, Florida, United States
- Nearest city: Florida City, Florida
- Coordinates: 25°22′58″N 80°36′35″W
- Area: 4,000 acres (1,600 ha)
- Opened: November 23, 1916
- Closed: October 10, 1947
- Administrator: Florida Federation of Women's Clubs
- Status: now part of Everglades National Park
- Hiking trails: 2

Royal Palm was founded in 1916 as Florida's first state park. It was located in Miami-Dade County, Florida, and was added as a part of the Everglades National Park in 1947.

== Island ==
Paradise Key is located southwest of Homestead, Florida. It is a hammock in the Everglades surrounded by a slough that was first noted by a federal surveyor in 1847. The island included the largest stand of royal palms (Roystonea regia) in the state, as well as orchids, ferns and other rare tropical plants. Royal Palm State Park was created to protect Paradise Key.

== History ==
Beginning in the mid-1880s, development in Florida grew as Henry Flagler's Florida East Coast Railway was extended from Jacksonville to St. Augustine then to Palm Beach and Miami. The efforts to drain the Everglades lacked an understanding of the geography and ecology of the Everglades.

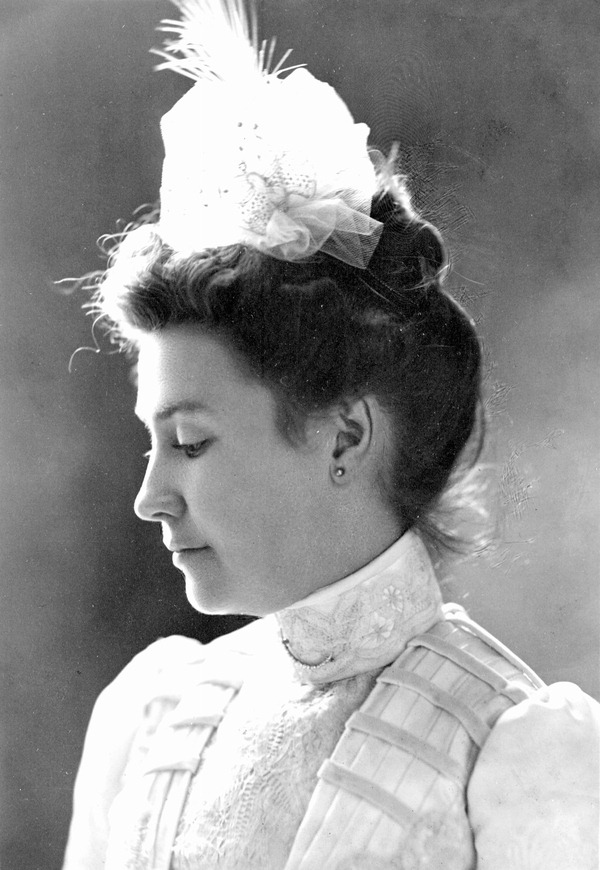
May Mann Jennings

Scientists requested that Paradise Key be protected from development, but they were mostly ignored until May Mann Jennings and the Florida Federation of Women's Clubs (FFWC) took up the cause. At the time, vandals and road workers were plundering palms and other rare plants. Jennings' father, Austin Mann, served in the Florida legislature and her husband, William Sherman Jennings, was Florida Governor from 1901 to 1905. Her political connections and those of her fellow Women's Club members secured a grant from the legislature of 960 acres (390 ha) to the FFWC but without initial or continuing financial support. It was the first conservation action approved by the state. Henry Flagler's widow, Mary Lily Kenan Flagler Bingham, matched the state grant for a total of 1,920 acres (780 ha) when the park was dedicated on November 23, 1916. The Ingraham highway, a new road from Florida City to Paradise Key was dedicated at the same time.

=== Survey ===
William Edwin Safford was a biologist with the United States Department of Agriculture in September 1917. David F. Houston, the Secretary of Agriculture, dispatched Safford to conduct a survey of the southern Everglades. According to Safford, the specimens he gathered "resulted in collections in nearly all branches of Natural History, the material of which has been studied and classified by specialists and deposited in the collections of the Smithsonian Institution, the United States Natural Museum, the Bureau of Entomology and the Biological Survey." Safford, a noted botanist, gave this description of Paradise Key in 1919:

Paradise Key, an island in the heart of the Everglades of Florida, is almost unique from a biological point of view, presenting as it does a remarkable example of a subtropical jungle within the limits of the United States in which primeval conditions of animal and plant life have remained unchanged by man, and thus offering a striking contrast to the keys along the coast of Florida as well as to other Everglade keys in which normal biological conditions have been greatly disturbed by destructive fires, clearing of forests or the construction of drainage canals, which not only affect the original conditions, but at the same time permit aquatic animals and plants previously unknown to penetrate into the Everglades. The region is also remarkable for the fact that it is a meeting place for many temperate and tropical types of plants and animals. On this account and from the fact that it offers a virgin field for collectors in most branches of natural history, it seems of the highest interest and importance that a careful study of its biological features should be made.

In his report, Safford thanked Royal Palm State Park warden Charles A. Mosier, whom he described as a "born woodsman and accomplished naturalist".

=== Operation ===
The FFWC functioned on a shoe-string budget. They had no funds for ongoing park expenses, much less park development. Mrs. Jennings wrote to hundreds of individuals, organizations and publications to solicit contributions. Some park land was leased to area farmers. Small donations arrived, but the park was constantly in need of funds. The Miami–Dade County Commission made a one-time appropriation of $1200. Charles Mosier was hired as caretaker and his family arrived in March 1916. John Umphrey began construction of the lodge; park improvements including trails and picnic tables were added.

Royal Palm Lodge at Royal Palm State Park

In the 1917 and 1919 legislative sessions, funding requests were submitted and denied. The 3-story Royal Palm Lodge was completed in 1919 as housing for the caretaker, visitors and scientists. The state donated an additional 2,080 acres (840 ha) to the park by 1921 for a total of 4,000 acres (1,600 ha). At the park, numerous visiting scientists were studying the area and publishing papers which encouraged more visitors. Mrs. Jennings' husband died in early 1920, and she grieved at her home for almost a year, nearly giving up on the park. For the 1921 legislative session, she again requested funding. Finally, a $2,500 recurring appropriation was approved. Following the 1926 Miami hurricane and Everglades fires, $10,000 was provided for restoration.

During the Great Depression, a camp for Emergency Conservation Work (ECW) operated in the park from a nearby base in Homestead, Florida, where the camp was located from October 1933 to June 1934. The ECW, later known as the Civilian Conservation Corps, contributed a massive labor force that the park had previously lacked; up to 200 workers could contribute to park maintenance, public relations (e.g. as tour guides) and construction. ECW personnel helped to replant an area that had been burned in a 1927 wildfire. Trail improvements and the laying of a telephone line into the park were important accomplishments of the ECW camp. Additional structures built included a deer yard, a concrete pond and various park support buildings, such as a garage. The workers also received a natural history lecture from Ernest Coe, an advocate of Everglades conservation.

=== Termination ===
The Florida Federation of Women's Clubs administered the park's operation for more than 30 years until President Harry Truman dedicated the Everglades National Park on December 6, 1947, after which the state park ceased to exist. At the ceremony, Mrs. Jennings presented a plaque representing the symbolic gift of the park to the nation. The former state park was the site of the first Everglades National Park visitor center and later became the Royal Palm Visitor Center within the park. On November 17, 2016, there was a celebration to commemorate Royal Palm State Park's centennial.

== See also ==
- List of Florida state parks

== Gallery ==
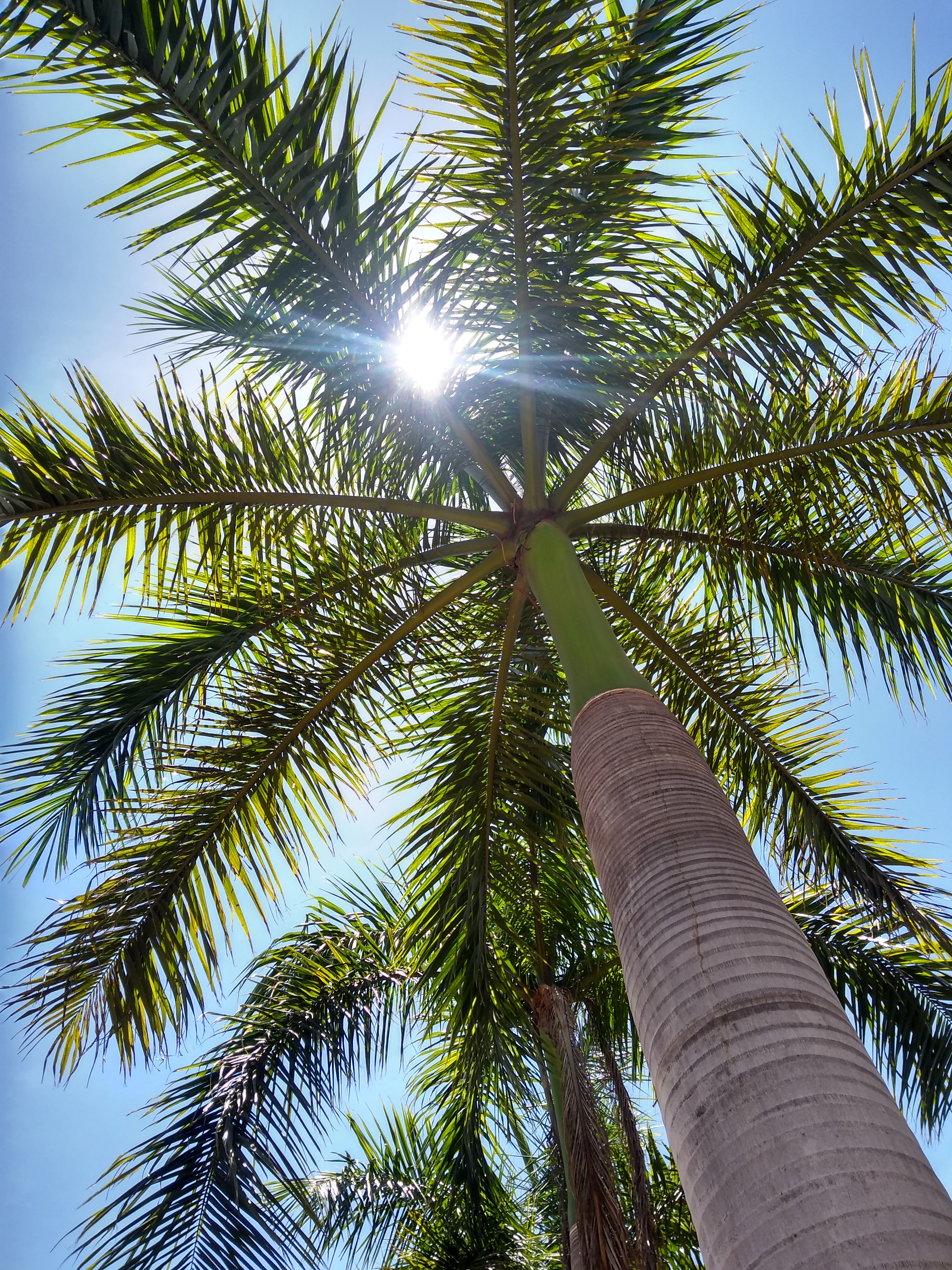

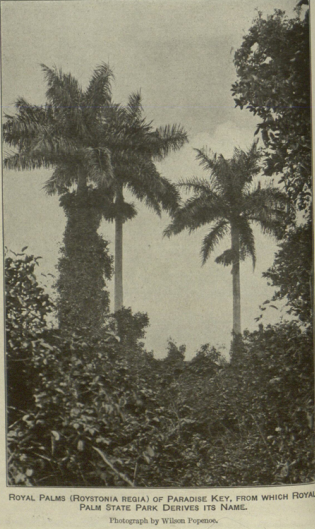

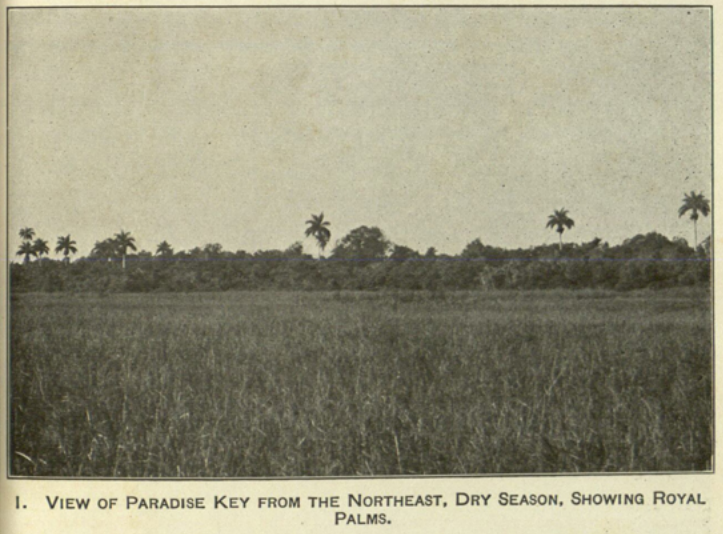

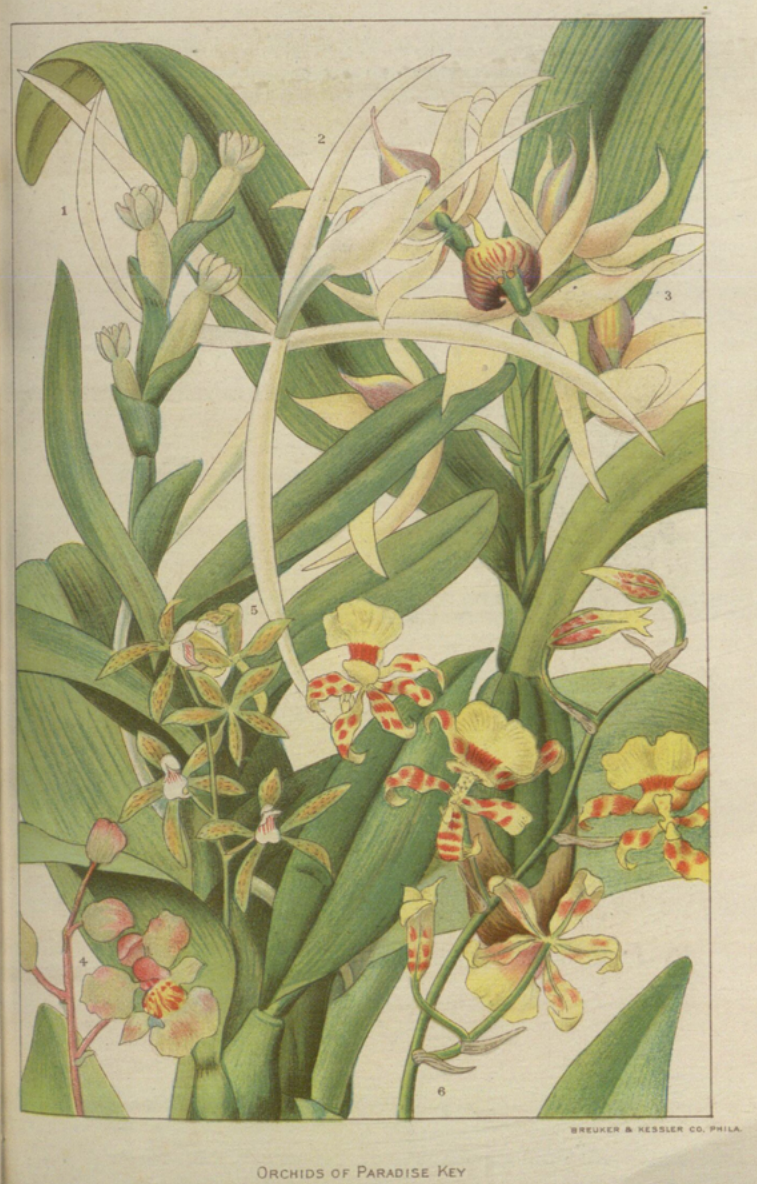

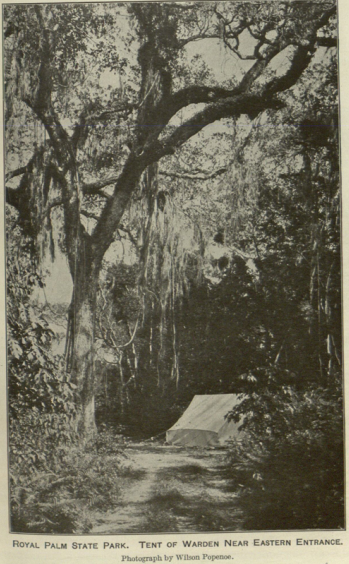
