= Ernest F. Coe =

American landscape designer

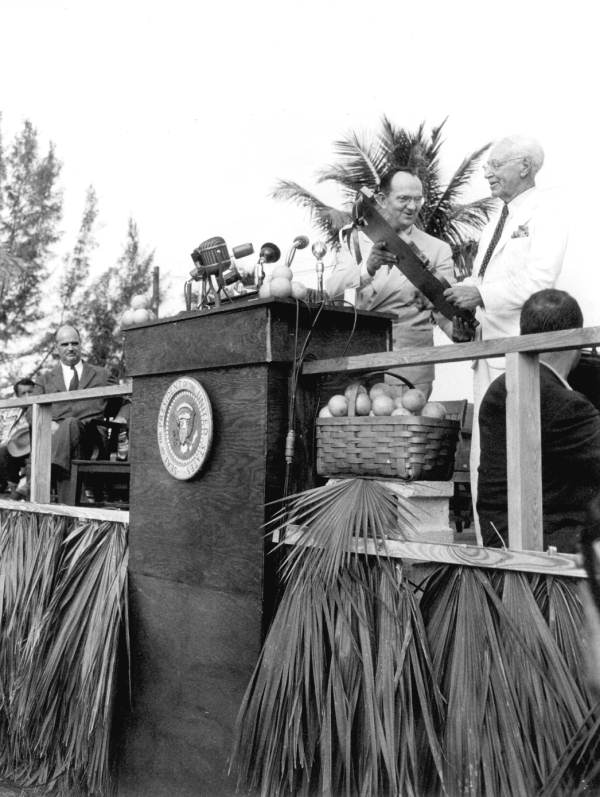
Ernest Coe, right in white, receiving a plaque at the dedication of Everglades National Park in 1947

Ernest Francis Coe, also "Tom Coe" (March 20, 1867 – January 1, 1951) was an American landscape designer who envisioned a national park dedicated to the preservation of the Everglades, culminating in the establishment of Everglades National Park. Coe was born and spent most of his life in Connecticut as a professional gardener, moving to Miami at age 60. He was enormously impressed with the Everglades and became one of several South Florida-based naturalists who grew concerned for the wanton destruction of plants, animals, and natural water flow in the name of progress and prosperity. Coe worked for more than 20 years to get Everglades National Park established, but he viewed the effort as mostly a failure. However, Oscar L. Chapman, former Secretary of the Interior, stated "Ernest Coe's many years of effective and unselfish efforts to save the Everglades earned him a place among the immortals of the National Park movement."

== Early life and move to Florida ==
Coe was born in New Haven, Connecticut, and attended Yale College of Fine Arts from 1885 to 1887. Trained as a landscape architect, he spent his 40-year career designing New England gardens and estates. He and his wife Anna moved to Miami, Florida, in 1925 when he was 60 years old, and continued professional gardening in Florida, opening an office in Coral Gables, Florida. He became involved in the same intellectual and social circles as Charles Torrey Simpson and David Fairchild, who together formed the Florida Society of Natural History.

== Experience with the Everglades ==
South Florida in the 1920s was experiencing an unprecedented population surge that was answered by real estate development and speculation. Coe was one of the victims of such speculation as he lost a significant investment. As a result of the land boom, portions of the Everglades began to be drained and turned into residential and business zones. Wading birds were slaughtered by the millions for their colorful feathers that were used in women's hats. Rare orchids were plucked from their habitats, and hunting of animals was unchecked. Meetings of the Florida Society of Natural History began to focus on this destruction and how to prevent it and many ideas were floated about how to preserve a portion of the Everglades. Florida's first state park, Royal Palm State Park was dedicated in 1916 to protect Paradise Key.

Coe began to venture into the Everglades to see the flora and fauna for himself, driving deep into the wilderness and hiking on his own, often sleeping on the ground with his head covered with a pillowcase to save himself from the mosquitoes. When a neighbor suggested a trek to Cape Sable to gather as many orchids as possible, Coe was appalled and began to work for the idea of a protected area.

== Everglades Tropical National Park Association ==
The Everglades Tropical National Park Association was established by Coe in 1928 with Fairchild, University of Miami president Bowman Foster Ashe, and journalist Marjory Stoneman Douglas on the committee. It followed two very destructive hurricanes that caused widespread flooding in Miami and from Lake Okeechobee. One of the association's primary selling points was to portray the proposed area that would receive protection as worthless for human habitation and commercial enterprise; so far controlling the natural floods in the region had met with no success and a tourist attraction such as the park would be favorable. Coe insisted that "tropical" be used in the park name, to allude to the salubrious nature of tropical weather. It invoked a foreign place to most Americans and reminded them that it was, at the time, the only tropical location within U.S. borders.

Coe drafted the proposal for the park and Senator Duncan Fletcher and Congresswoman Ruth Bryan Owen introduced the legislation to create Everglades National Park. This followed a delegation visit to tour the area in 1930 that took one day by car, another by boat, and another by Goodyear Blimp. Although Coe spent the blimp trip airsick and vomiting into a bucket sitting next to a sympathetic Douglas while they both rode below the blimp in the observer's coop, the visiting delegation was duly impressed and immediately supported the idea after shifting their concepts of the Everglades from a miasmatic swamp to a beautiful paradise.

Coe was so enthusiastic about the park that he won over opponents and the undecided and caused supporters to shy away from him. He "made a nuisance of himself" in his own words, and "was the very figure of a man obsessed" according to Douglas. Coe gave speeches at civic, garden and rotary clubs, and held informal meetings with Seminoles and white squatters living in the Everglades, who saw him as an interloper and often threatened him. Douglas wrote that Coe visited her father as the editor of The Miami Herald, and Coe read aloud all the letters he received and wrote while Frank Stoneman was forced to sit and listen even though he backed the idea of the park.

The Great Depression created economic obstacles for the park, and Owen lost her congressional seat. Coe, however, worked tirelessly for the park's establishment in Washington D.C. He sent coconuts to congressmen, President Herbert Hoover, and the Secretary of the Interior. While the concept of what landscapes were worth protecting were developing in the minds of scientists and politicians, Coe used any tactic he could think of to advance the idea of Everglades National Park, even equating its powers with the mythical Fountain of Youth. He took Congressional appointees from the Department of the Interior on tours through the Everglades, and though attempts to establish the park failed twice, it finally passed in May 1934. It carried a provision that the federal government would not be responsible for buying lands for the park, but its establishment ensured that no more land would be purchased from the protected area. Removing the prospect of developing lands in South Florida angered many state politicians. Newly elected governor Fred P. Cone fired Coe and left the Everglades Tropic National Park Commission without any guidance.

== Park establishment ==
Everglades National Park was not dedicated until 1947. Coe spent the time between its approval and its dedication attempting to raise funds for lands for the park and assuring park detractors that it would simultaneously attract tourists without destroying the ecosystems it was designed to protect. Executive secretary of the National Parks Association and wilderness advocate Robert Sterling Yard was among several skeptics who doubted that business endeavors in Florida and a protected area could coexist. Establishment of the park initiated the first U.S. government contact with the Seminoles outside military action in the Seminole Wars when the Bureau of Indian Affairs and Secretary of the Interior were charged with deciding what to do with them. Coe pushed for including considerations for Seminole lands within the structure of the park, although beyond roles as tour guides and park vendors, he thought the Seminoles should be restricted from using the park. In his opinion, the park should have been "free of all human interference".

Anna Coe died in 1941, but as she was ailing, Ernest Coe continued to write to politicians running for governor, as did Miami Herald editor John Pennekamp, urging them not to forget the directive of the park, particularly in the face of continuing poaching and destruction of the natural resources of the area. Originally, Coe envisioned 2,500 square miles (6,500 km^{2}) of protected land, spanning from Lake Okeechobee to the Florida Keys, including marine coral reefs, and the Big Cypress Swamp. This was an extraordinary amount of land to consider, and the prevailing belief was that only spectacular landforms warranted protection. Many of the park's detractors saw the Everglades as flat and filled with loathsome reptiles. Even the park's supporters had difficulty justifying the inclusion of Coe's vision. May Mann Jennings, who worked to establish Royal Palm State Park and expanded it considerably during the Depression with projects sponsored by the Civilian Conservation Corps, thought Coe's insistence on the amount of land was absurd and began to consider Coe a political liability to the park's establishment.

What was eventually approved was 2,000 square miles (5,200 km^{2}), much of it parceled out and disconnected. Florida donated 454,000 acres (1,840 km^{2}), but it was only a quarter of what the park was supposed to encompass. Companies interested in mining rights held large swaths of land and insisted on making deals. Individual landowners continued to hold out for better prices. In The Everglades: River of Grass, Marjory Stoneman Douglas alludes to "all sorts of fraudulent schemes" to solidify the land included in the park, of which Coe was one of many working for this goal. When the park was dedicated, Coe was bitterly disappointed in the final product and resigned from the committee in protest. It was considerably smaller than what he designed and he criticized the politicking and short-sightedness of the deals to make it happen. Only lands south of the Tamiami Trail were considered to be within the park boundaries, and Coe was concerned that the park could not survive if lands were drained or water was diverted north of the road. Although he refused to have anything more to do with the Everglades, when the park was dedicated in a ceremony attended by President Harry Truman, Coe sat on the stage with the president.

== Death and honors ==
Coe died in 1951, at 84 years of age. Decades following his attempts to make the Everglades a whole protected area, his efforts were recognized when John Pennekamp Coral Reef State Park on Key Largo, the Florida Keys National Marine Sanctuary, and Big Cypress National Preserve were gradually protected; all had been within Coe's original plans to be included with the Everglades. In 1997, the 105th Congress declared that Coe was the primary force behind the creation of Everglades National Park, acknowledged that he is considered the "Father of Everglades National Park", and resolved that the visitor center closest to Homestead be dedicated in his name.

== Bibliography ==
- Clement, Gail. "Reclaiming the Everglades / Ernest F. Coe". Florida International University. Archived from the original on November 27, 2020.
- Davis, Jack (2009), An Everglades Providence: Marjory Stoneman Douglas and the American Environmental Century, University of Georgia Press (2009). ISBN 0-8203-3071-X
- Douglas, Marjory (1947). The Everglades: River of Grass. 60th Anniversary Edition, Pineapple Press (2007). ISBN 978-1-56164-394-3
- Douglas, Marjory; Rothchild, John (1987). Marjory Stoneman Douglas: Voice of the River. Pineapple Press. ISBN 0-910923-94-9
- Grunwald, Michael (2006). The Swamp: The Everglades, Florida, and the Politics of Paradise. Simon & Schuster. ISBN 978-0-7432-5105-1
