= Mannfield, Florida =

Ghost town and temporary county seat in Florida

- extinct town
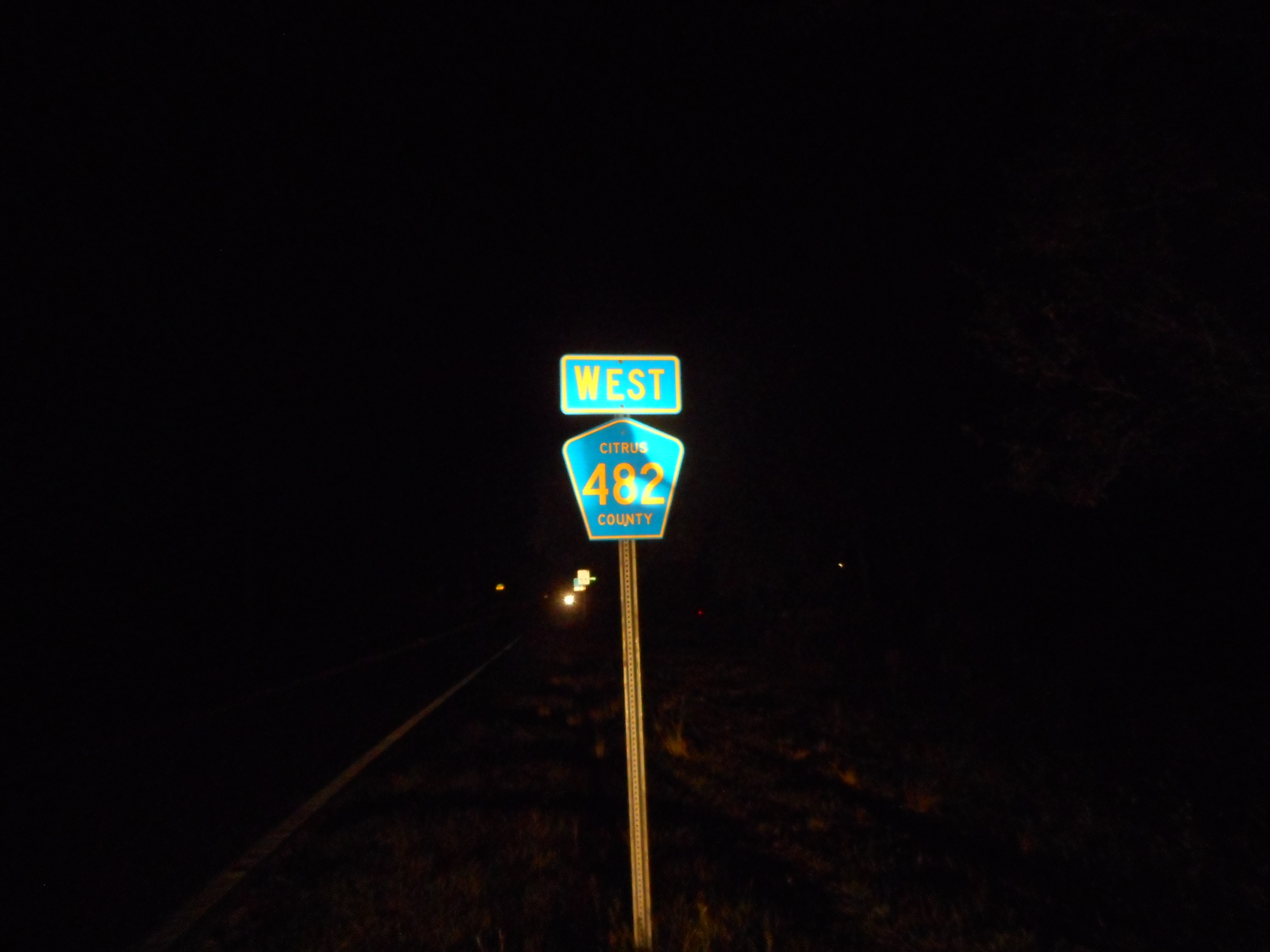
- Street sign right outside Mannfield
- Interactive map of Mannfield, Florida
- Coordinates: 28.7834°N 82.4439°W
- Founding: 1884
- Founder: Austin Mann
- Named for: Austin Mann
- Time zone: Eastern Standard Time

Mannfield is an extinct town near Lecanto, Florida in the Withlacoochee State Forest in Citrus County, Florida.

It was named after State Senator Austin S. Mann. Mannfield was first settled in March 1884, located in what was then Hernando County, Florida.

On June 2, 1887, Hernando County was divided into three parts, resulting in the creation of Citrus County to the north, and Pasco County to the south. Mannfield served as the county seat of Citrus County from 1887 to 1891, at which point the seat was relocated to Inverness. There is no exact date for when the town was finally abandoned, but the loss of its county seat status is considered to be the beginning of Mannfield's decline.

Beginning in January 1888, the Citrus County Star newspaper was published in Mannfield. The newspaper remained in Mannfield until September 1891, when it moved to Inverness. Finally, in February 1892, the Star was relocated to Brooksville, in Hernando County, and renamed the Brooksville Star.

Mannfield is now a ghost town in the Withlacoochee State Forest and has no permanent residents anymore due to the town's extinction.

== See also ==
- List of ghost towns in Florida
- Great Freeze
