= 1900 Florida gubernatorial election =

- November 6, 1900
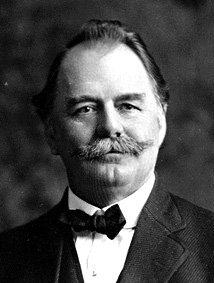

Nominee	William Sherman Jennings	Matthew B. MacFarlane
Party	Democratic	Republican
Popular vote	29,251	6,238
Percentage	80.98%	17.27%

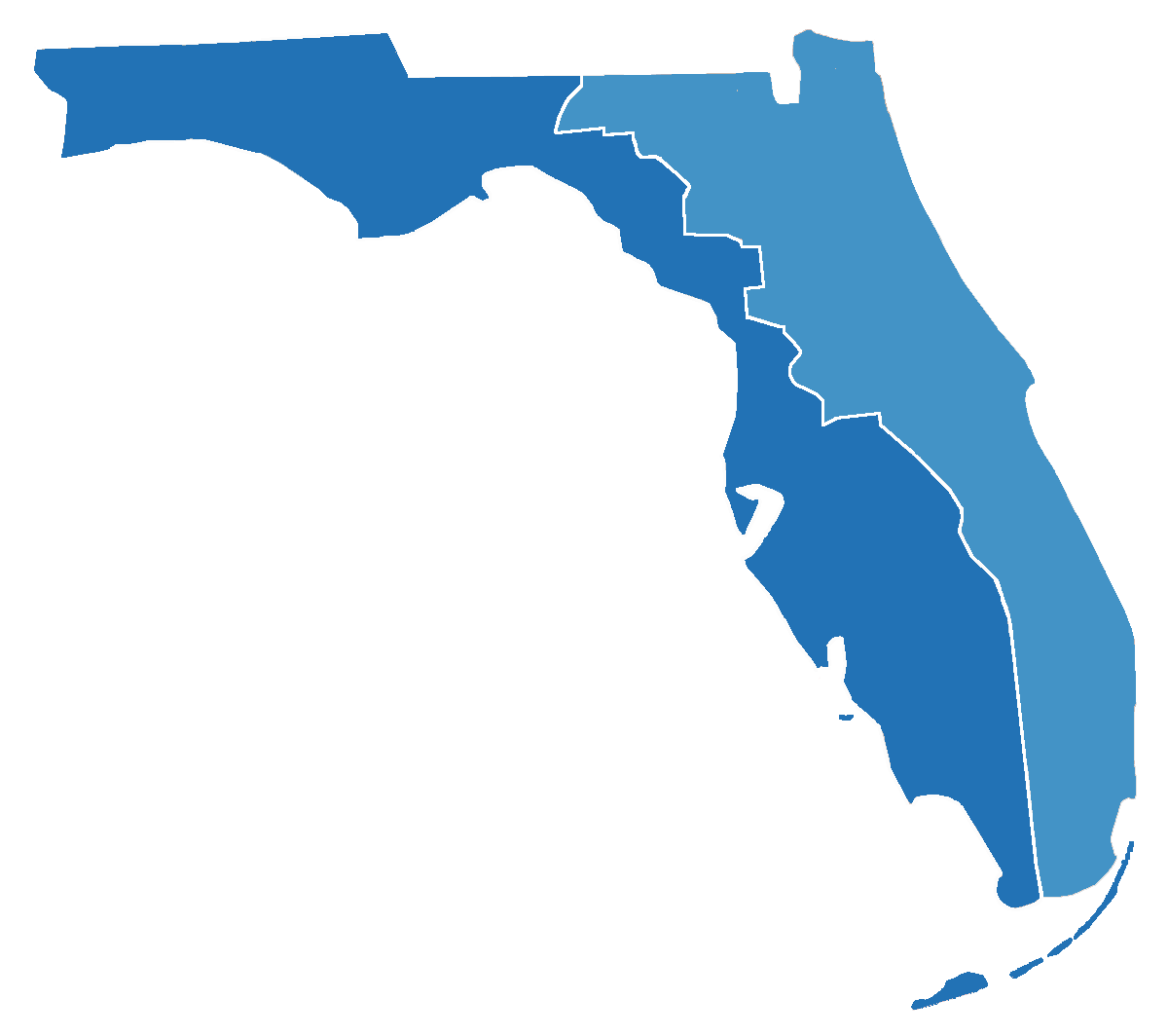
Jennings
50–60%
60–70%
70–80%
80–90%
>90%
Governor before election
William D. Bloxham
Democratic
Elected Governor
William Sherman Jennings
Democratic

The 1900 Florida gubernatorial election was held on November 6, 1900. Democratic nominee William Sherman Jennings defeated Republican nominee Matthew B. MacFarlane with 80.98% of the vote.

== General election ==
=== Candidates ===
Major party candidates

- William Sherman Jennings, Democratic
- Matthew B. MacFarlane, attorney, US Customs Service collector in Tampa, former Tampa City Council member

Other candidates

- A.M. Morton, People's

=== Results ===
1900 Florida gubernatorial election
Party	Candidate	Votes	%	±%
Democratic	William Sherman Jennings	29,251	80.98%	
Republican	Matthew B. MacFarlane	6,238	17.27%	
Populist	A.M. Morton	631	1.75%	
Majority		23,013		
Turnout				
Democratic hold		Swing		

==== Results by County ====
County	William S. Jennings Democratic		Matthew B. MacFarlane Republican		A. M. Morton Populist		Total votes
County	#	%	#	%	#	%	Total votes
Alachua	1,367	80.27%	326	19.14%	10	0.59%	1,703
Baker	195	70.40%	76	27.44%	6	2.17%	277
Bradford	755	78.00%	181	18.70%	32	3.31%	968
Brevard	534	80.66%	120	18.13%	8	1.21%	662
Calhoun	195	72.76%	49	18.28%	24	8.96%	268
Citrus	408	94.23%	15	3.46%	10	2.31%	433
Clay	323	75.82%	89	20.89%	14	3.29%	426
Columbia	640	71.51%	244	27.26%	11	1.23%	895
Dade	970	69.04%	420	29.89%	15	1.07%	1,405
DeSoto	528	75.86%	145	20.83%	23	3.30%	696
Duval	2,061	79.85%	520	20.15%	0	0.00%	2,581
Escambia	1,566	84.24%	267	14.36%	26	1.40%	1,859
Franklin	232	62.03%	138	36.90%	4	1.07%	374
Gadsden	692	95.71%	30	4.15%	1	0.14%	723
Hamilton	334	78.22%	80	18.74%	13	3.04%	427
Hernando	249	90.88%	16	5.84%	9	3.28%	274
Hillsborough	2,367	81.65%	532	18.35%	0	0.00%	2,899
Holmes	372	84.74%	49	11.16%	18	4.10%	439
Jackson	928	82.78%	141	12.58%	52	4.64%	1,121
Jefferson	699	87.59%	95	11.90%	4	0.50%	798
Lafayette	329	93.47%	20	5.68%	3	0.85%	352
Lake	540	80.84%	125	18.71%	3	0.45%	668
Lee	306	86.44%	44	12.43%	4	1.13%	354
Leon	943	83.75%	178	15.81%	5	0.44%	1,126
Levy	429	86.49%	62	12.50%	5	1.01%	496
Liberty	132	88.59%	15	5.12%	2	1.34%	149
Madison	516	94.33%	28	5.12%	3	0.55%	547
Manatee	539	86.10%	76	12.14%	11	1.76%	626
Marion	1,128	84.18%	175	13.06%	37	2.76%	1,340
Monroe	745	71.22%	270	25.81%	31	2.96%	1,046
Nassau	412	75.46%	123	22.53%	11	2.01%	546
Orange	896	68.82%	389	29.88%	17	1.31%	1,302
Osceola	254	100.00%	0	0.00%	0	0.00%	254
Pasco	505	90.34%	49	8.77%	5	0.89%	559
Polk	945	85.37%	150	13.55%	12	1.08%	1,107
Putnam	676	74.53%	225	24.81%	6	0.66%	907
Santa Rosa	626	92.19%	26	3.83%	27	3.98%	679
St. Johns	818	78.43%	201	19.27%	24	2.30%	1,043
Sumter	359	89.97%	34	8.52%	6	1.50%	399
Suwannee	642	84.58%	101	13.31%	16	2.11%	759
Taylor	287	78.42%	9	2.46%	70	19.13%	366
Volusia	776	75.27%	248	24.05%	7	0.68%	1,031
Wakulla	256	86.49%	39	13.18%	1	0.34%	296
Walton	383	80.63%	92	19.37%	0	0.00%	475
Washington	394	59.25%	226	33.98%	45	6.77%	665
Actual Totals	29,251	80.54%	6,438	17.73%	631	1.74%	36,320
Official Totals	29,251	80.98%	6,238	17.27%	631	1.75%	36,120

Counties that flipped from Populist to Democratic

- Calhoun
- Taylor
