= Judge Willis Russell House =

Historic house in Florida, United States

- U.S. National Register of Historic Places
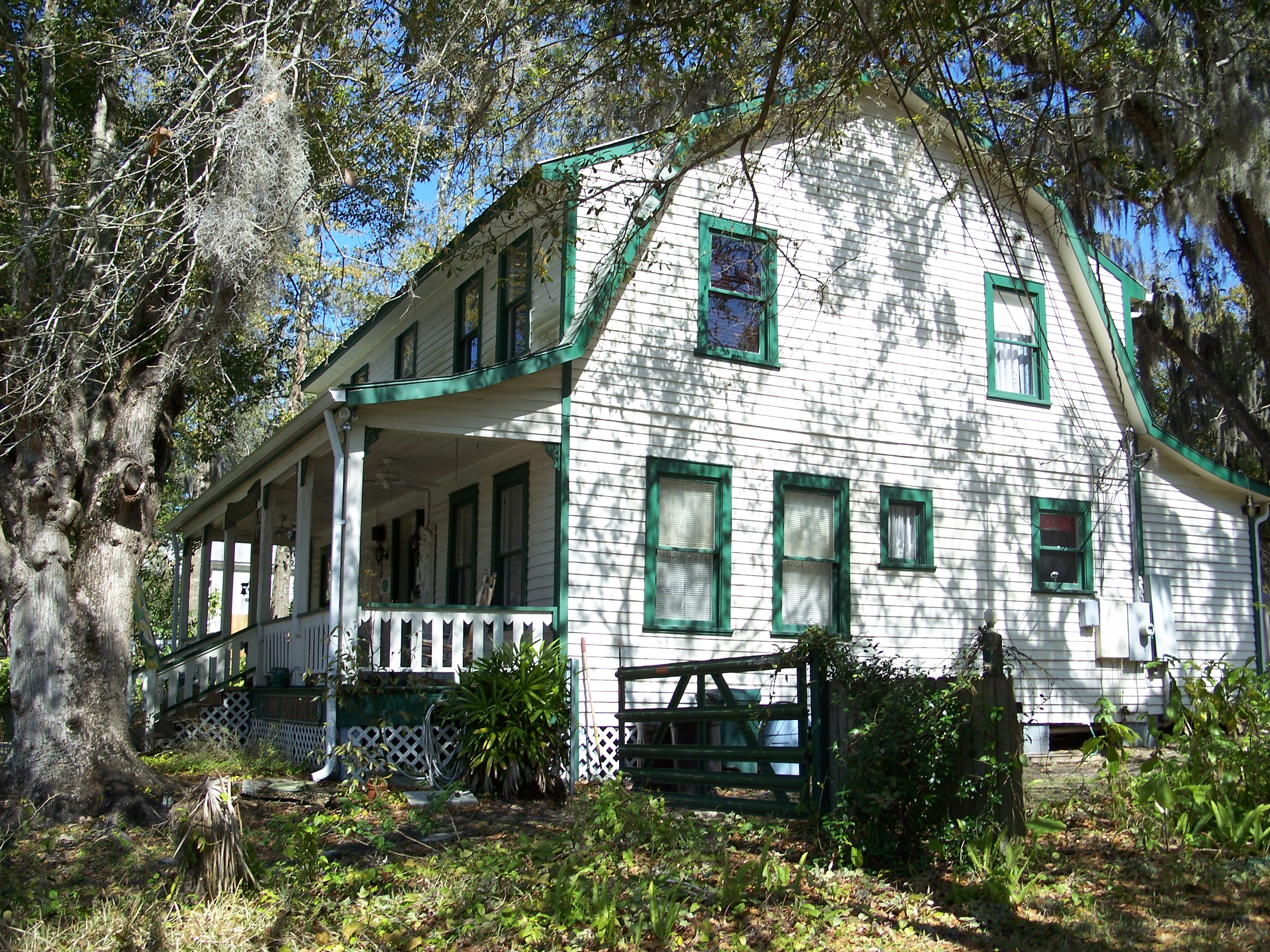

- Location within Florida Location within the United States
- Location: Brooksville, Florida
- Coordinates: 28°33′7″N 82°23′15″W
- Built: 1925
- Architectural style: Frame Vernacular
- NRHP reference No.: 99000046
- Added to NRHP: January 27, 1999

The Judge Willis Russell House (also known as the Verona House) is a U.S. historic building in Brooksville, Florida. It is located at 201 South Main Street. On January 27, 1999, it was added to the U.S. National Register of Historic Places.
