= William Sherman Jennings House =

Historic residence in Brooksville, Florida, United States

- U.S. National Register of Historic Places
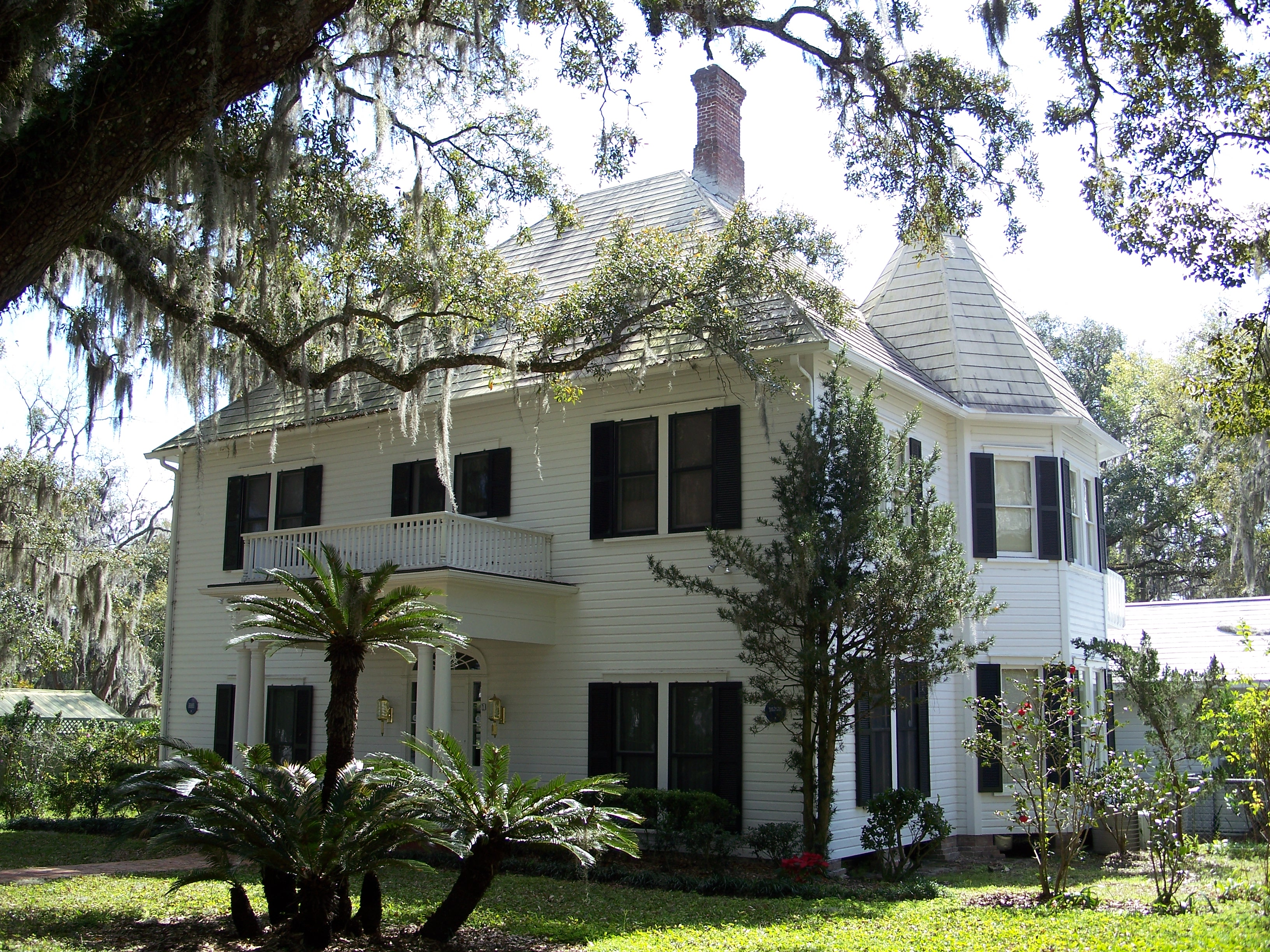

- Location within Florida Location within the United States
- Location: Brooksville, Florida
- Coordinates: 28°32′55″N 82°23′6″W
- Built: 1886
- Architectural style: Queen Anne/Colonial Revival
- NRHP reference No.: 98001252
- Added to NRHP: October 22, 1998

The William Sherman Jennings House (also known as the May Mann Jennings House or the Jennings-Rogers House) is a historic residence in Brooksville, Florida, United States. It dates to ca. 1888. Located at 48 Olive Street, it was added to the National Register of Historic Places on October 22, 1998.

== Original owners ==
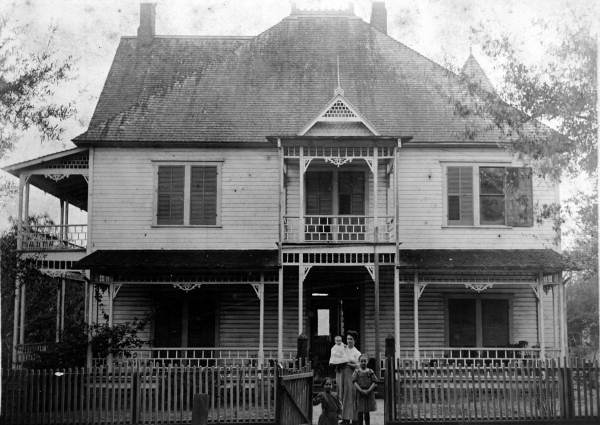
William S. Jennings House in Brooksville, Florida

The house was owned by William Sherman Jennings and his wife, May Mann Jennings, who married on May 12, 1891. William Jennings was a lawyer, Hernando County Judge, State Legislator and Florida Governor from 1901 to 1905. May Jennings was active in civic work and politics, serving as president of the Florida Federation of Women's Clubs, co-founder of the Florida League of Women Voters and supported a dozen other causes.

== Gallery ==
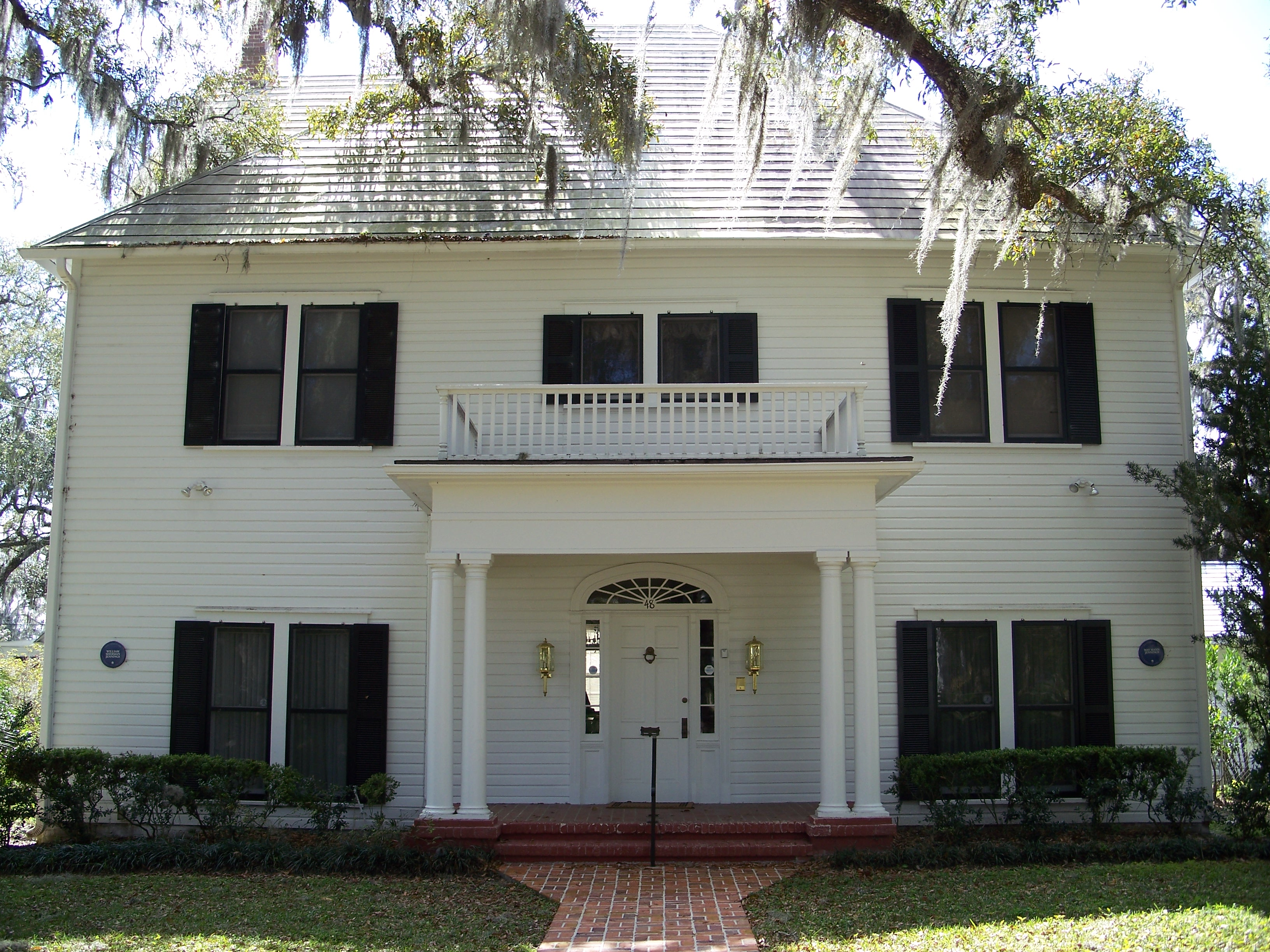

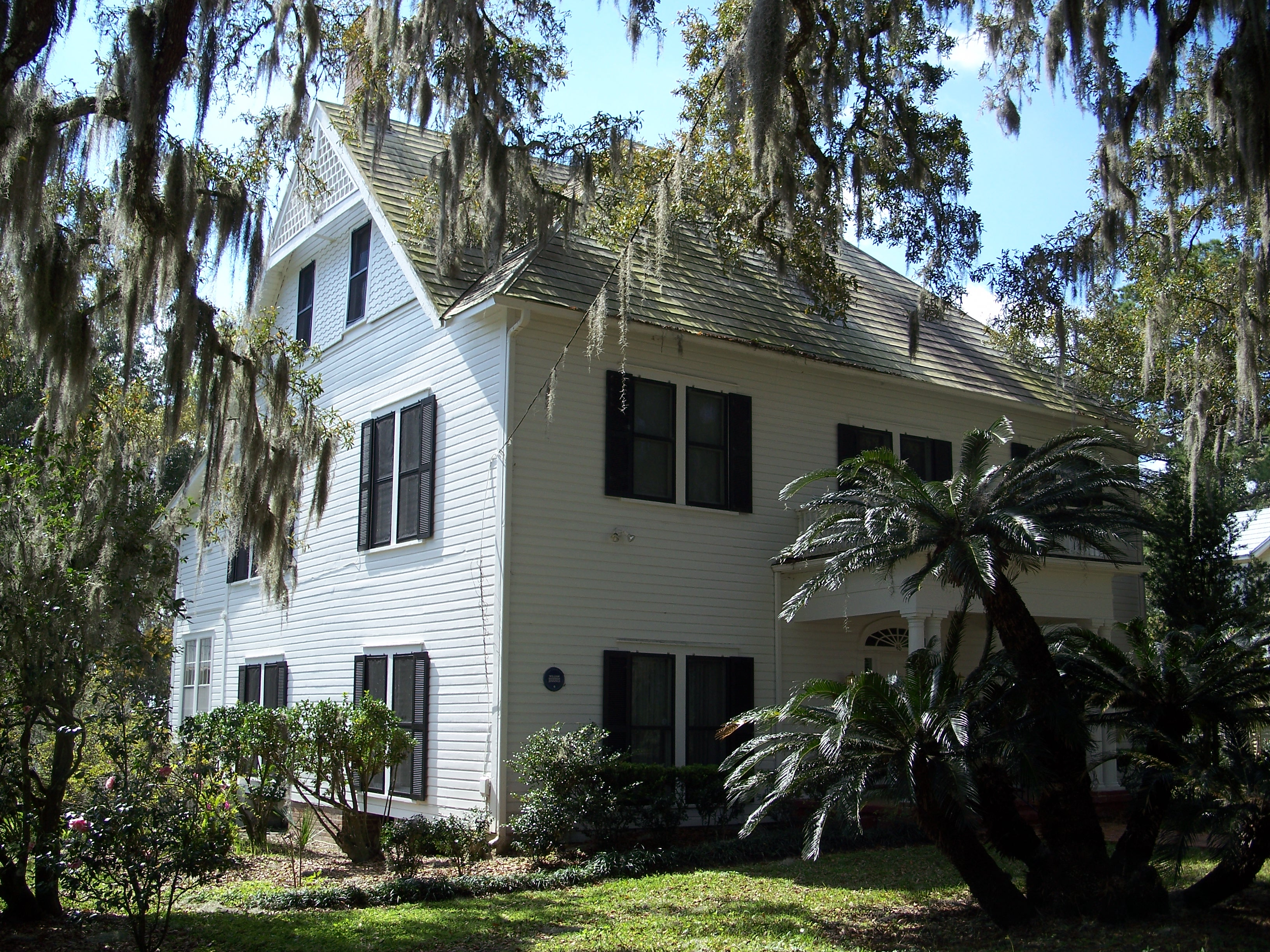

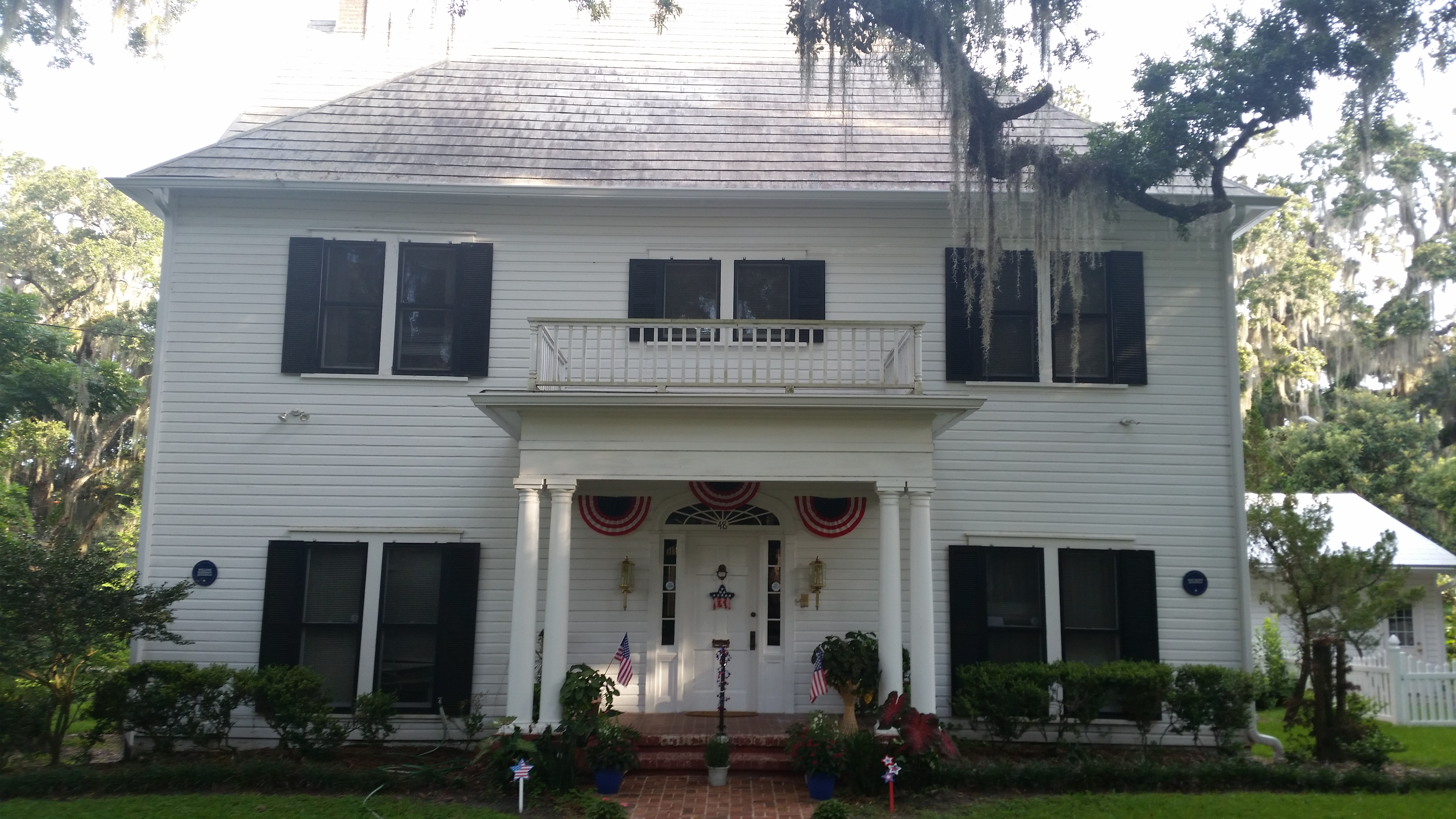

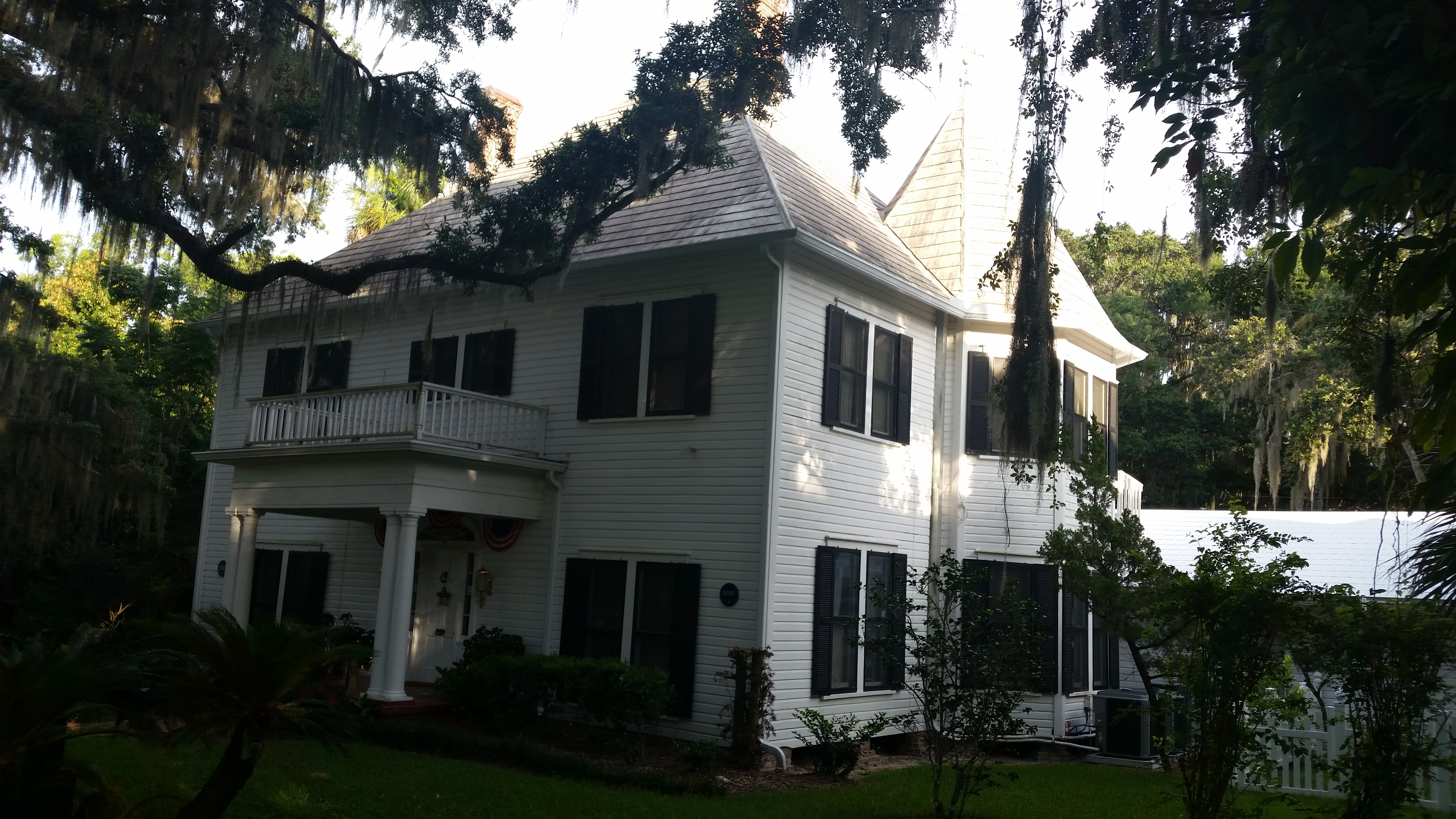

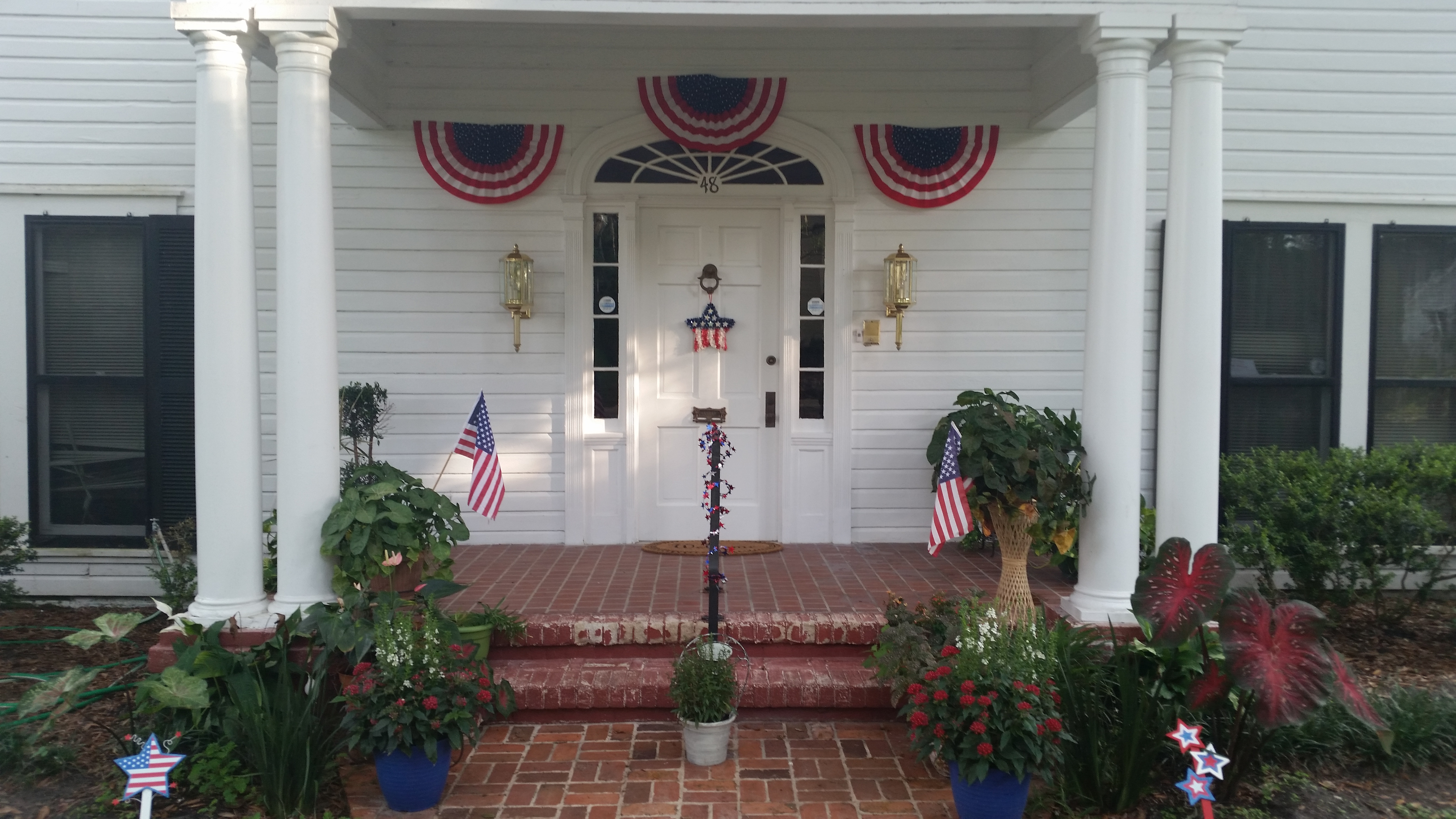

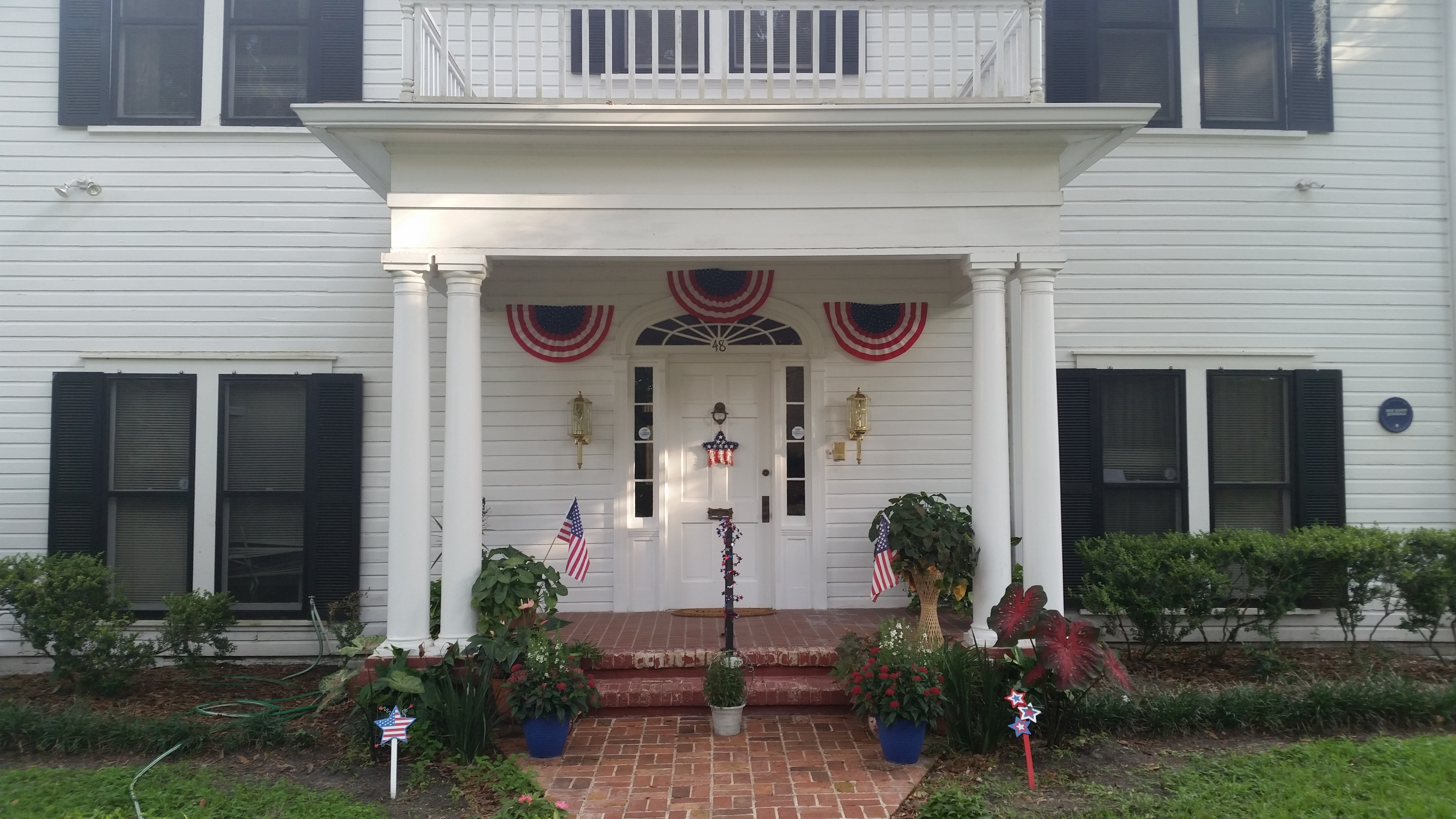

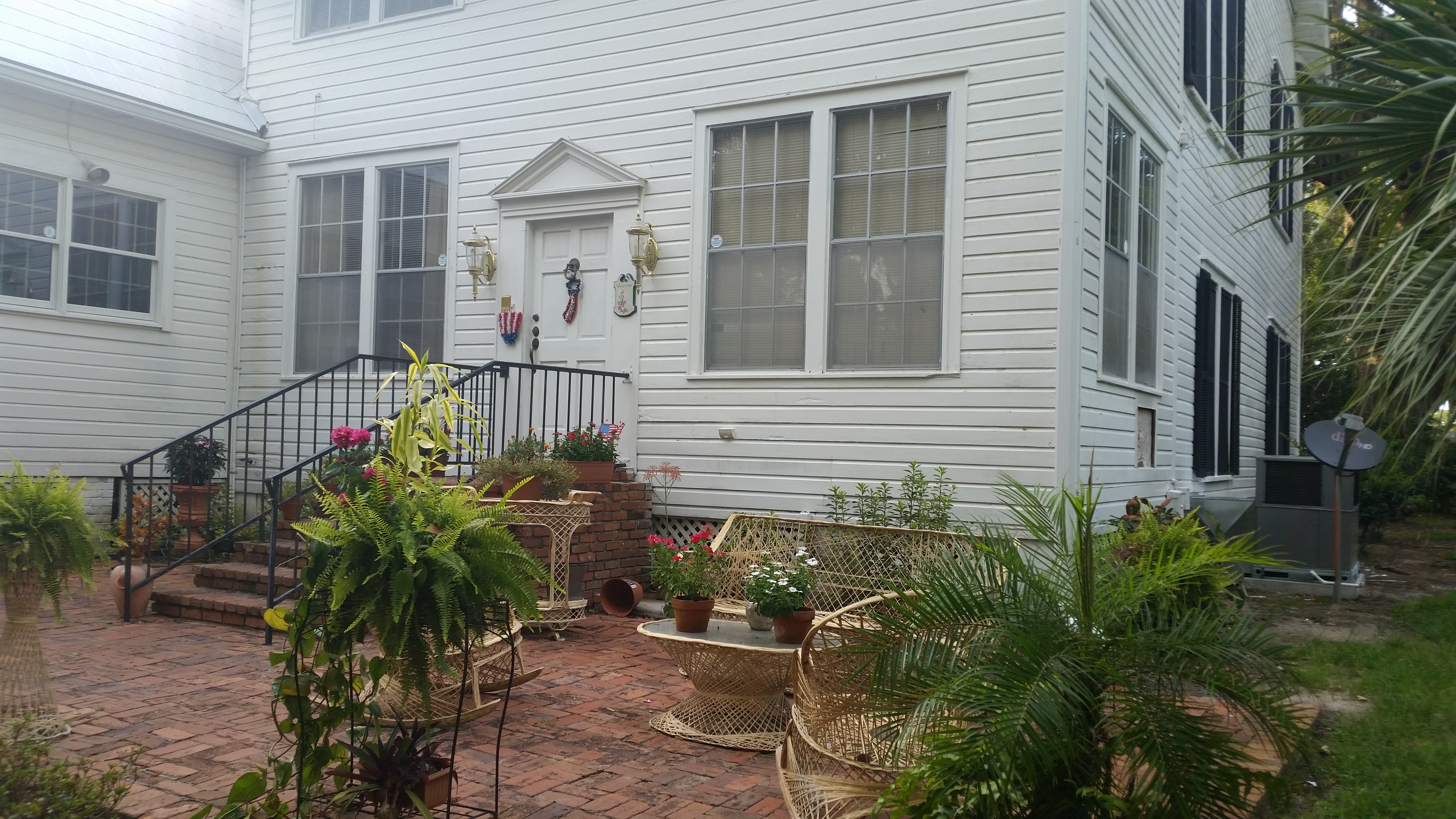

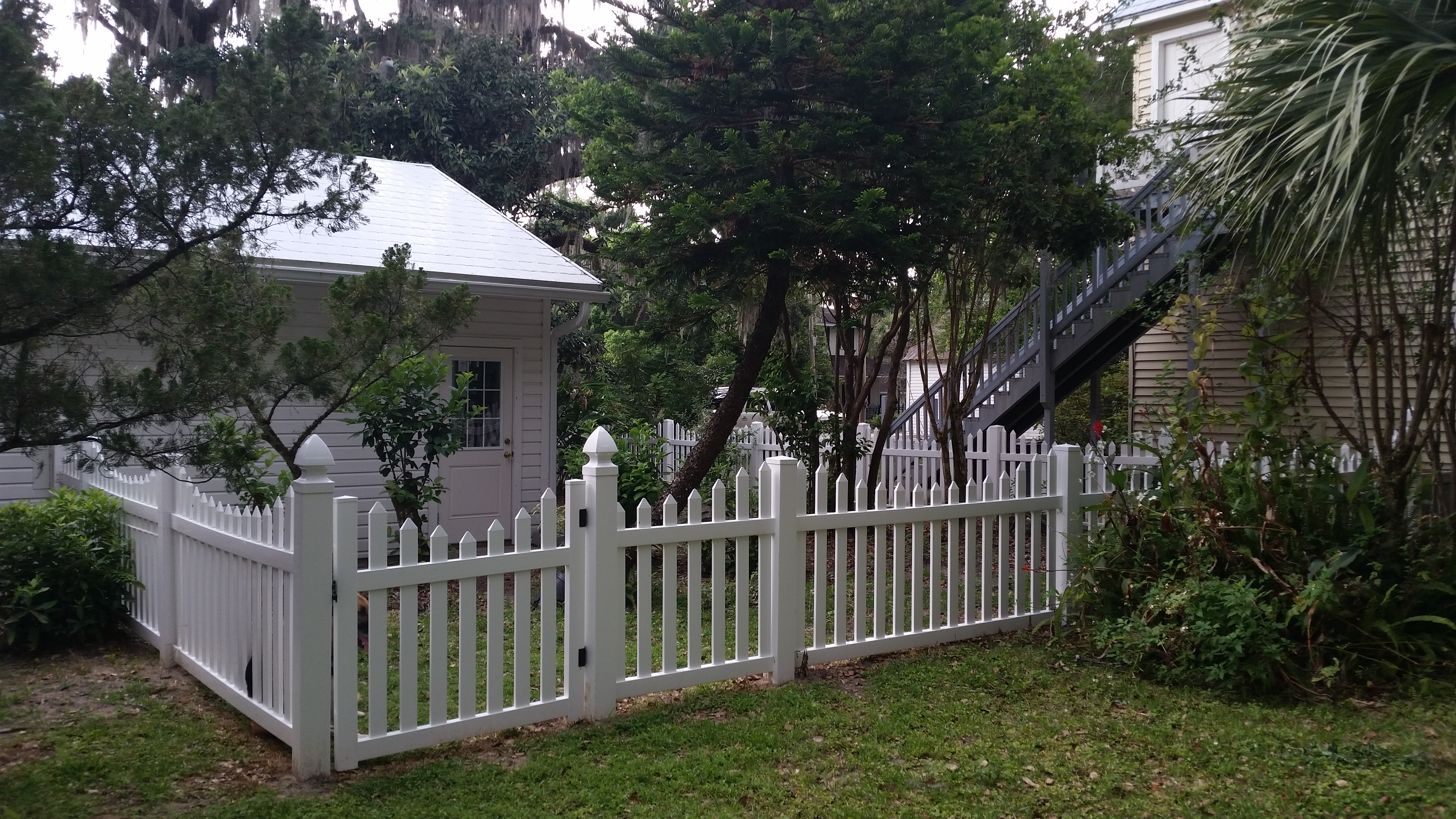

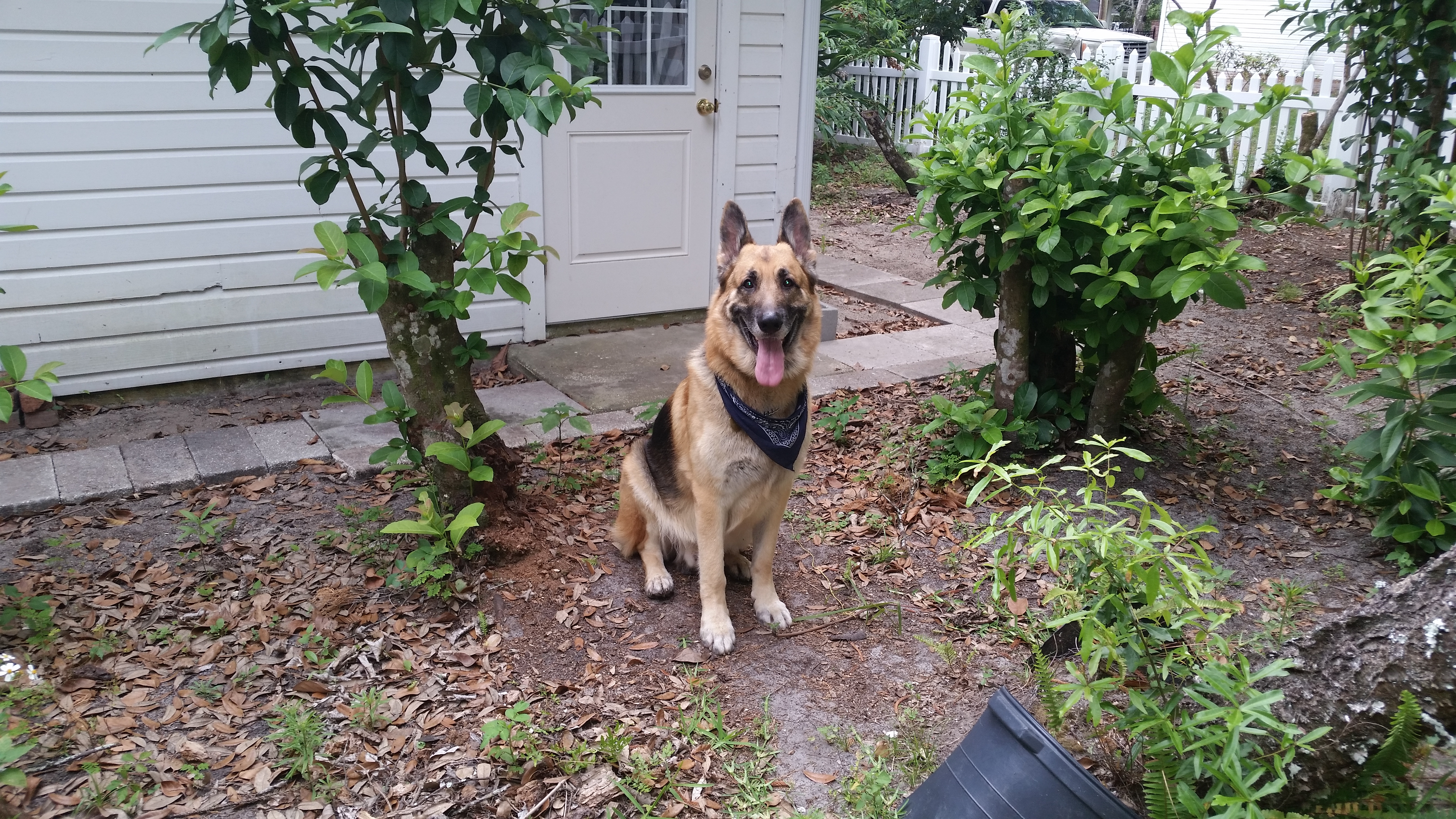
