= May Mann Jennings =

American activist (1872–1963)

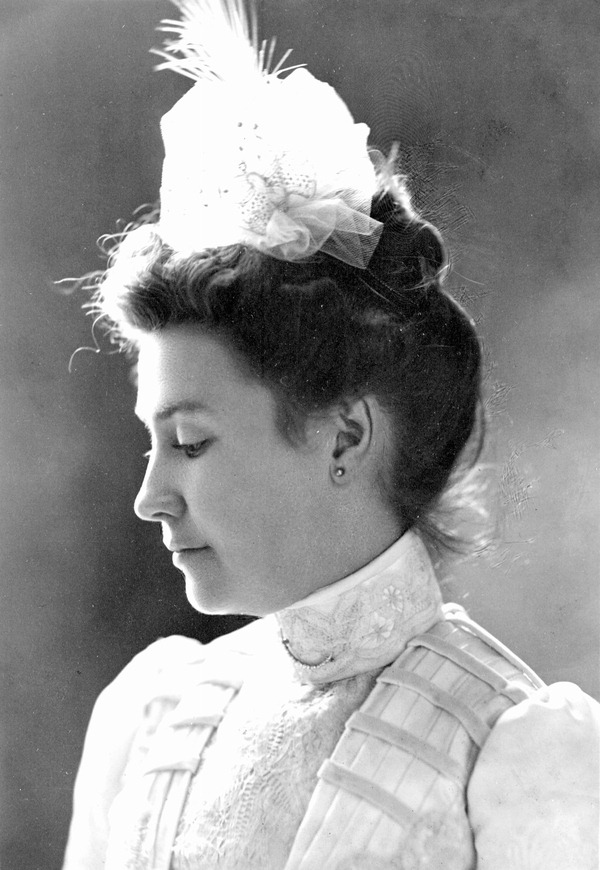
- Jennings in 1901

First Lady of Florida
- In role 1901–1905
- Governor: William Sherman Jennings
- Preceded by: Mary C. Davis Bloxham
- Succeeded by: Annie Isabell Douglass

Personal details
- Born: May Austin Elizabeth Mann; April 25, 1872 Bayonne, New Jersey, U.S.
- Died: April 24, 1963 (aged 90) Jacksonville, Florida, U.S.
- Spouse: William Sherman Jennings (m. 1891; died 1920)
- Children: 1
- Parent: Austin Mann (father)
- Education: St. Joseph Academy
- Occupation: Activist

May Mann Jennings (born May Austin Elizabeth Mann; April 25, 1872 – April 24, 1963) was an American activist who was the first lady of Florida from 1901 to 1905. As one of Florida's most powerful and influential women, she was a leader of organizations, both civic and philanthropic, and founder of the League of Women Voters of Florida. Her father, Austin Mann, was a state senator and May Mann worked as his assistant when he ran for and was elected state representative. She became the first lady of Florida as wife of Governor William Sherman Jennings and is credited with having advanced his political career significantly through relationships gained while working for her father and through her many activities.

== Early years ==
May Mann was born in the Centerville section of Bayonne, New Jersey. Her parents moved to Crystal River, Florida, in 1874. While living there her father, Austin Mann, was elected to the Florida Senate. Her mother, Rachel Mann, died in 1882 when May was nine, and her father sent May and her younger sister away to St. Joseph Academy in St. Augustine, Florida. The children spent vacations with their father in Tallahassee when the Legislature was in session. May was very bright and learned everything she could about people, politics, and the Capitol. She was valedictorian of her class when she graduated in 1889 and chose to continue in her studies at St. Joseph's Academy for an additional post-graduate year. Austin Mann then ran for the state House of Representatives and May assisted in the campaign, hosted teas, and spoke with people at rallies.

== Marriage ==
May Mann met Hernando County Judge William Sherman Jennings at her father's home near Brooksville, and a courtship began. May's father won election to the office of state senator and when the legislative session began in January 1891, May went to Tallahassee to serve as aide to her father. She was responsible for his appointments, correspondence, and hosting social events. William S. Jennings went to Tallahassee and the courtship continued. Judge Jennings married May Mann on May 12, 1891, and they were escorted down the aisle by the full legislative membership.

The newlyweds lived in Brooksville in what now is designated historically as the William Sherman Jennings House. In 1893, her husband was elected to the Florida legislature, and became Speaker of the House in 1895. The couple had one child, a son, born on November 11, 1893, and named Sherman Bryan Jennings. William then ran for and was elected governor of Florida in 1900. Many credit his meteoric rise in the state Democratic Party to May's extensive knowledge of state politics and politicians and to her vast network of relationships throughout the state among the Florida Federation of Women's Club members.

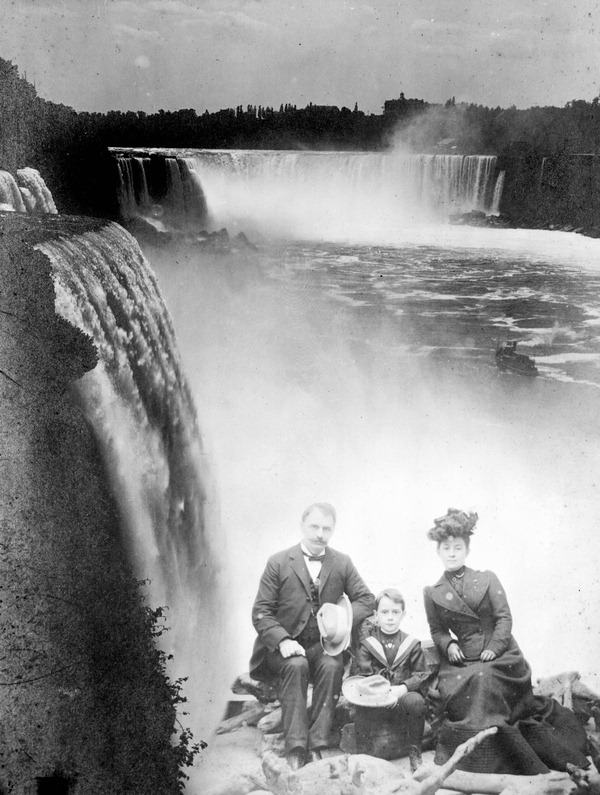
May Jennings with her husband and son at Niagara Falls

The Jennings' home in Jacksonville

In 1901, they moved to Tallahassee and for four years lived in the governor's mansion. Following her husband's term as governor, the couple moved to Jacksonville, then Florida's largest city, where he established a successful law practice. They divided their time between a home in Jacksonville and a farm near Middleburg, Florida, in Clay County, where they also had timber holdings. Her husband died in 1920.

== Civic work ==
May Jennings was an organizer of the Duval County Federation of Women's Clubs and was president of the Florida Federation of Women's Clubs. She used that influential network of motivated women to fight for issues including environmental conservation, child welfare, women's suffrage, the State Library of Florida in Tallahassee, reservations for the Seminoles, the establishment of compulsory education, stock fence laws, and preservation of state parks. Additional issues that Jennings campaigned and spoke for included prohibition, better treatment of children, the rights of prisoners, education reforms and funding, improvements in public welfare, public health, historic preservation, conservation, and highway beautification. Club women across the state worked in campaign drives, lobbied legislators, and appealed to other organizations for assistance.

On March 31, 1921, May Jennings co-founded the Florida State League of Women Voters. With the League, Jennings successfully campaigned for universal cattle dipping in Florida starting in 1923 (to combat tick-borne bovine babesiosis), but lobbied unsuccessfully in 1929 and 1931 for a 48-hour work week for women.

As vice-president and a founding member of the Florida State Historical Society, Jennings campaigned for the preservation of Turtle Mound, an ancient shell midden near the Indian River Lagoon in east Florida, and succeeded in arranging its purchase by the Historical Society in 1928. She was an organizer in state Democratic politics and served as campaign manager for Ruth Bryan Owen in her successful 1928 run for House of Representatives. In securing federal Civilian Conservation Corps workers for Royal Palm State Park during the Great Depression, Jennings cooperated with her son, Bryan, who had become president of the Florida Board of Forestry.

Jennings served on the Everglades National Park Commission, rejoining the commission after it was forced into inactivity by Governor Fred Cone and personally deeding her land near Flamingo, Florida to the project. She was the long-time president of the Duval County Highway Beautification Association from 1928 until 1958, having written state legislation, enacted in 1931, that reserved a portion of roads' right-of-ways to plantings and conservation. She led a beautification committee of the Florida Chamber of Commerce until 1961, the year she was diagnosed with cancer.

Jennings died on April 24, 1963, and was buried in Evergreen Cemetery (Jacksonville, Florida).

== Legacy ==
May Jennings was known as the "Mother of Florida Forestry" for her part in promoting and securing the legislative act that created the Florida State Board of Forestry, known today as the Division of Forestry. According to Ruthanne Vogel of the University of Miami, Jennings was "instrumental in the development of Royal Palm State Park near Homestead", which later was donated to the National Park Service and incorporated into Everglades National Park.

== Honors ==
- In 1929, Stetson University awarded May Jennings an honorary Doctor of Laws for her tireless civic and political work for a dozen worthy causes.
- She was named by the Lakeland Ledger as one of the most important Floridians of the twentieth century.
- May Mann Jennings was designated a Great Floridian by the Florida Department of State in the Great Floridians 2000 Program. A plaque attesting to the honor is located at the Jennings House in Brooksville. In 2008, she was also honored as a Great Floridian in the revived program.
- May Mann Jennings Park, a 33-acre (130,000 m^{2}) city of Jacksonville-owned park located in the northern part of the city is named in her honor. It opened in 1940.
- May A. Mann Jennings Hall at the University of Florida was named in her honor in 1962.
