= Austin Mann =

American politician (1847–1914)

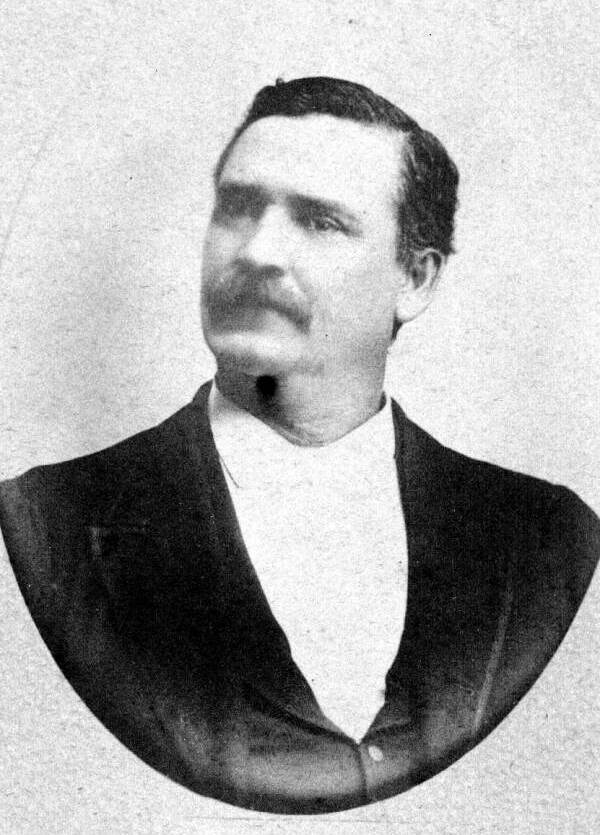

Florida State Senator
- In office 1883–1887

Florida State Representative
- In office 1891–1893

Personal details
- Born: January 14, 1847 Delaware County, Ohio, U.S.
- Died: September 19, 1914 (aged 67) Citrus County, Florida, U.S.
- Spouse: • Rachel Elizabeth "Lizzie" Kline (m. 1871; died 1882) • Susie B. Williams (m. 1885; died 1886) • Alsina M. Clark (m. 1891)
- Children: 6

Austin Shuey Mann (January 14, 1847 – September 19, 1914) was an American lawyer, orange grove owner, and politician who served in the Florida Senate and Florida House of Representatives. He represented Hernando County.

Mann was born in Ohio. He later lived in the area of Crystal River, Florida and had orange groves.

He served in the Florida Senate from 1883 until 1887. He was in the Florida House in 1891. Mannfield, Florida, the county seat until Inverness was chosen to replace it, was named for him. It is now a ghost town in the Withlacoochee State Forest.

His daughter, May Mann, married William Sherman Jennings, who served as Governor of Florida.
