= Brooksville, Florida =

- City
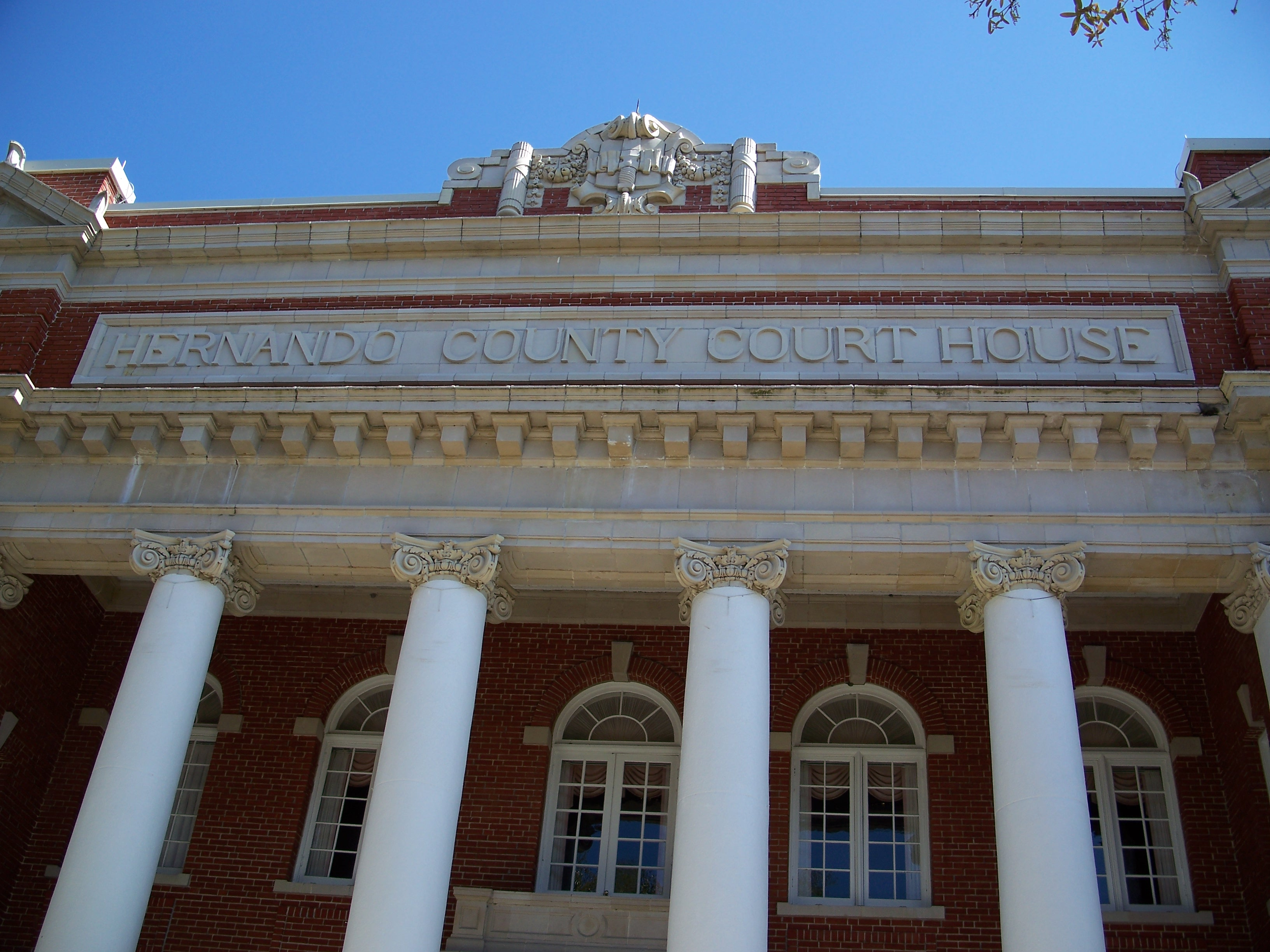
- Hernando County Courthouse

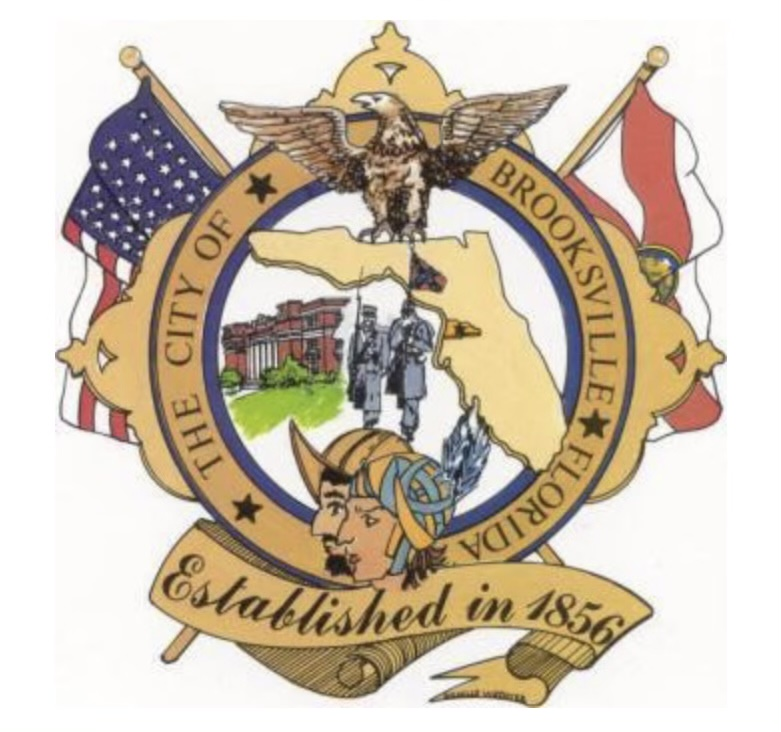
- Seal

- Location in Hernando County and the state of Florida
- Coordinates: 28°30′38″N 82°23′19″W
- Country: United States
- State: Florida
- County: Hernando
- Settled (Melendez and Pierceville Settlements): 1840–1845
- Incorporated (Town of Brooksville): 1856
- Incorporated (City of Brooksville): October 13, 1880

Government
  - Type: Council–Manager

Area
  - Total: 11.28 sq mi (29.22 km^{2})
  - Land: 11.19 sq mi (28.97 km^{2})
  - Water: 0.097 sq mi (0.25 km^{2})
- Elevation: 128 ft (39 m)

Population (2020)
  - Total: 8,890
  - Density: 794.9/sq mi (306.91/km^{2})
- Time zone: UTC-5 (Eastern (EST))
  - Summer (DST): UTC-4 (EDT)
- ZIP Codes: 34601-34605, 34613-34614
- Area code: 352
- FIPS code: 12-08800
- GNIS feature ID: 2403936
- Website: www.cityofbrooksville.us

Brooksville is a city in and the county seat of Hernando County, Florida, United States. As of the 2020 census, Brooksville had a population of 8,890. Brooksville is home to historic buildings and residences, including the homes of former Florida governor William Sherman Jennings and football player Jerome Brown.

Brooksville, established in 1856 by the merger of the towns of Melendez and Pierceville, took its name to honor Preston Brooks, a pro-slavery congressman from South Carolina, who caned and seriously injured Charles Sumner, an abolitionist and United States senator from Massachusetts.

== History ==
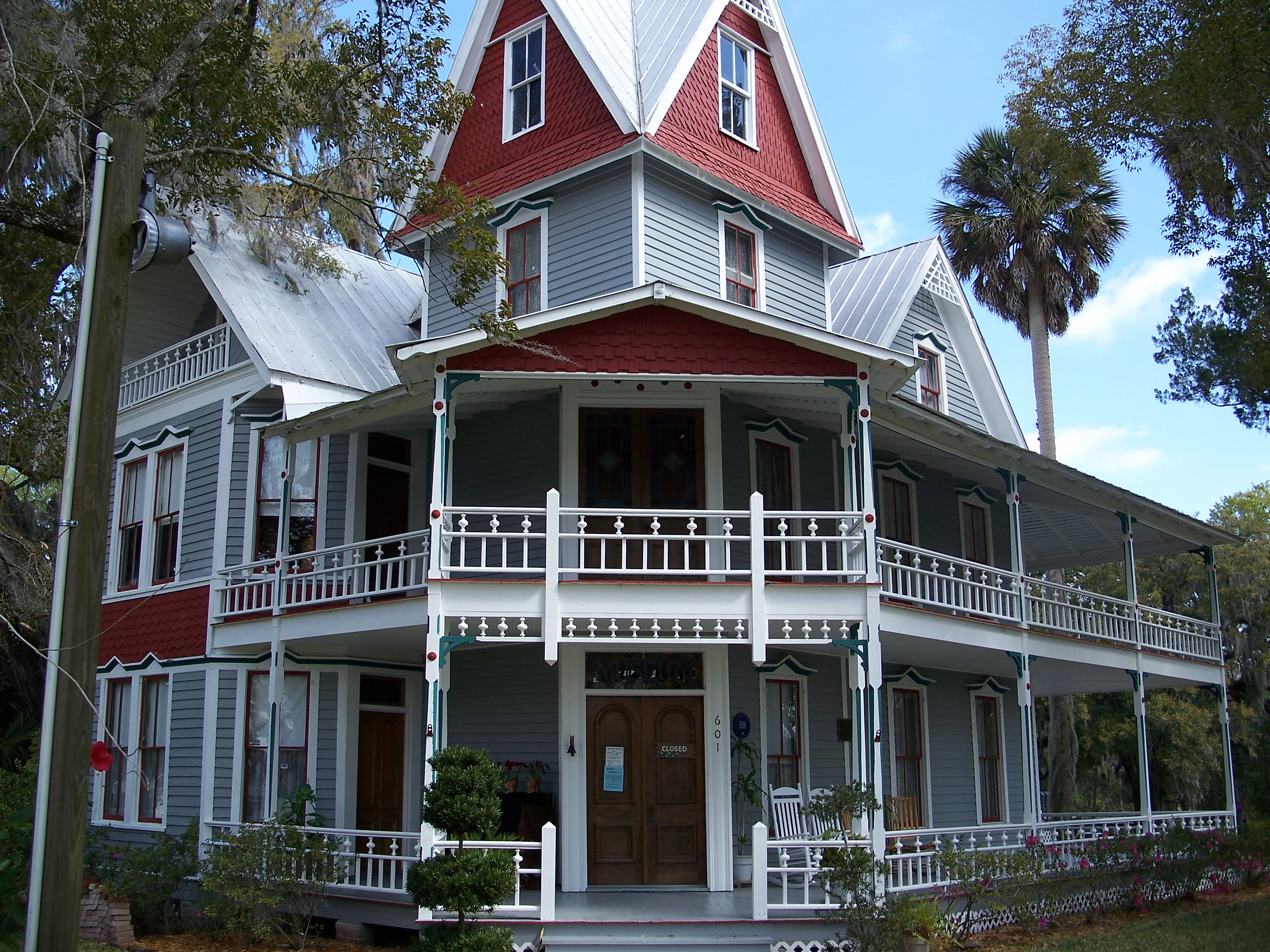
May Stringer House

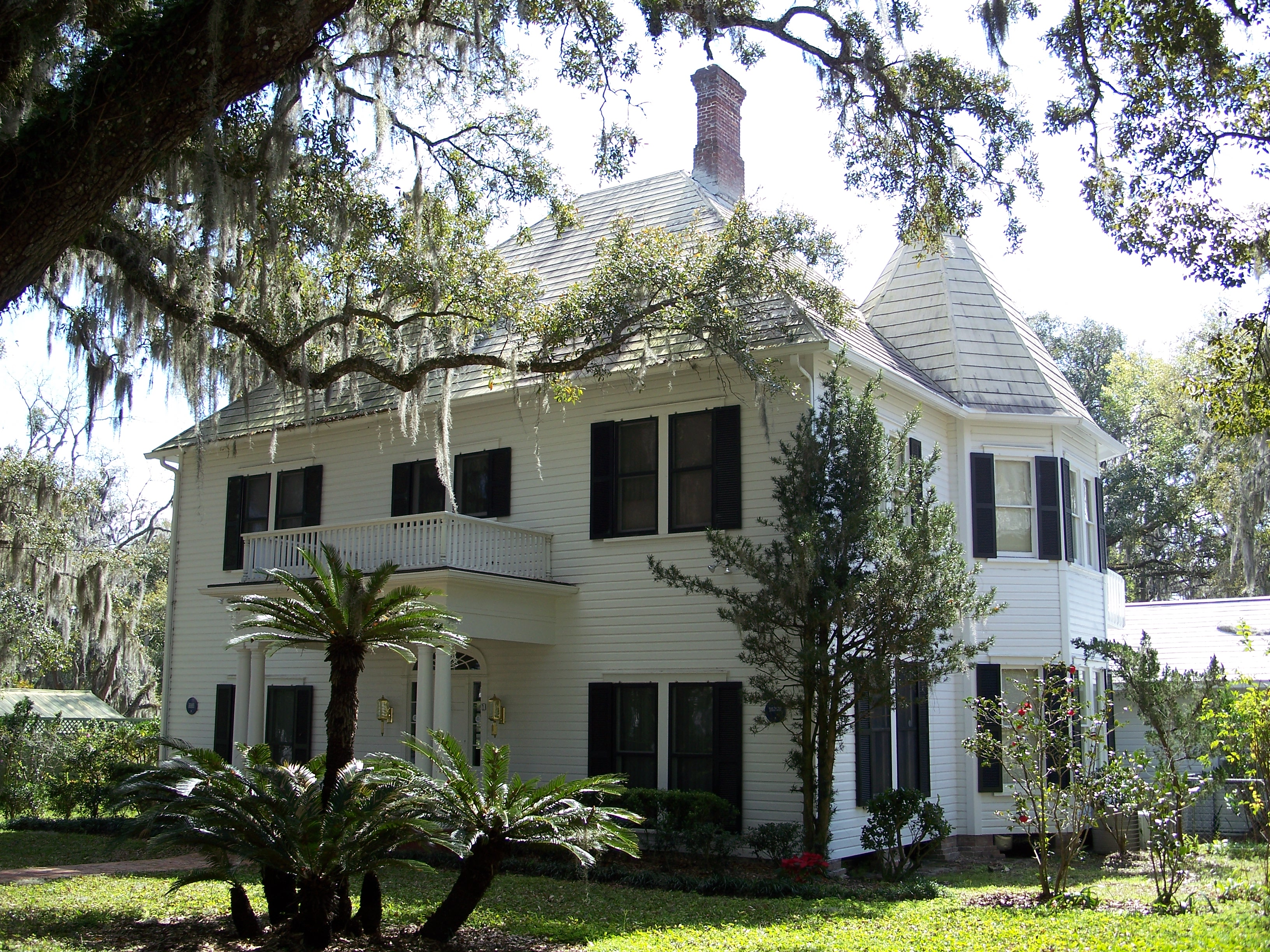
William Sherman Jennings House

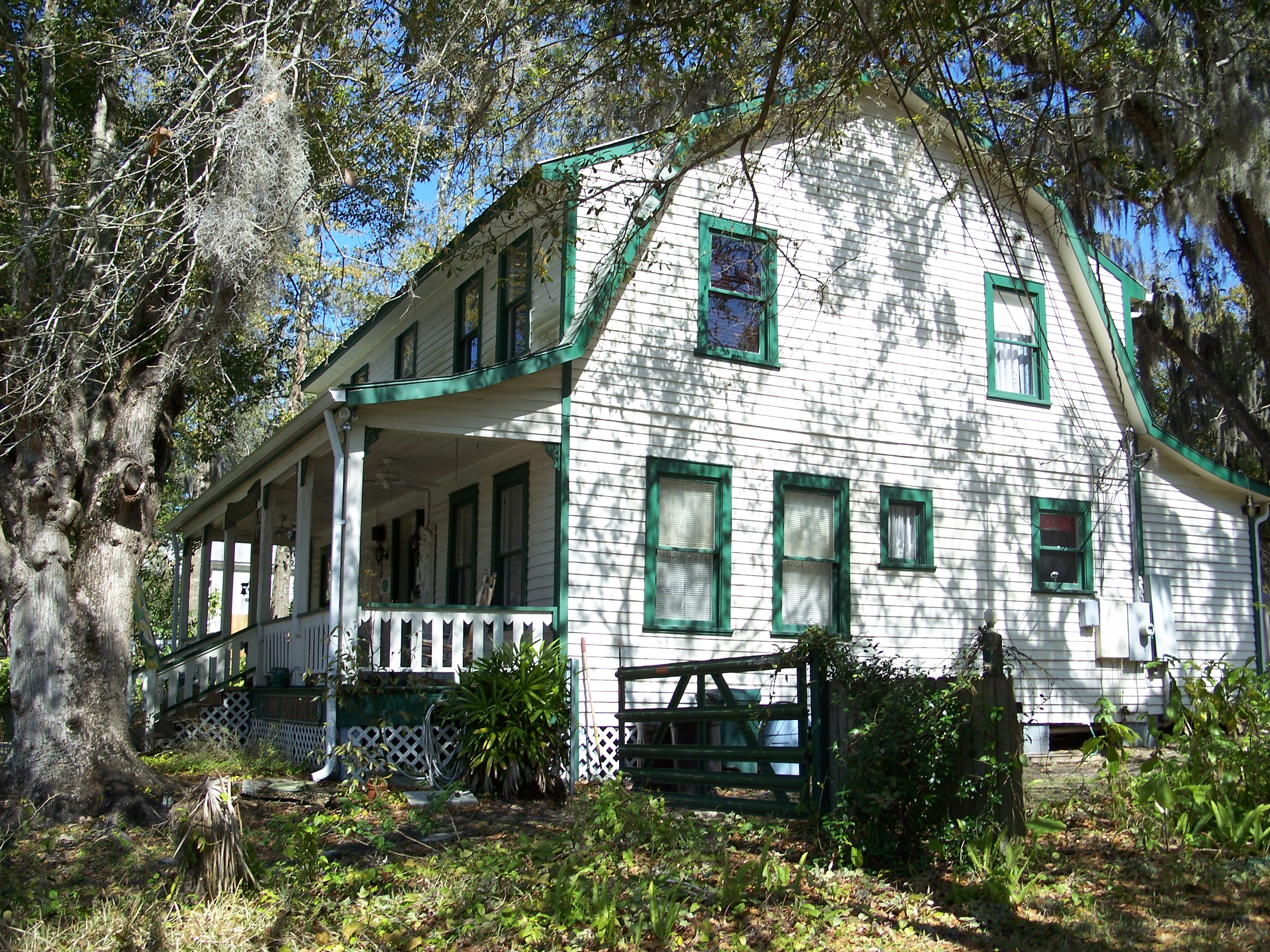
Judge Willis Russell House

=== 19th century ===
Fort DeSoto, established in 1840 to give protection to settlers from Native Americans, was located at the northeastern edge of present-day Brooksville on Croom Road about one-half-mile east of U.S. Highway 41. The fort was also a trading post and a regular stop on the Concord stagecoach line which ran from Palatka to Tampa.

The fort was built on top of a heavy bed of limestone, which was unknown of at the time. This made it difficult to obtain water, causing the location to be abandoned.

On September 12, 1842, during the Second Seminole War, the McDaniel party was attacked riding near the Seminole settlement known as "Chocochatti" or "Chocachatti", south of Brooksville, killing Mrs. Charlotte Crum (née Winn/Wynn; 1792–1842).

Brooksville was settled in 1845 by four families: the Howell family which settled the northern part of town; the Mays family which settled the eastern part of town; the Hale family on the west; and the Parsons family on the south. In the early 1840s the population shifted about 3 miles (5 km) to the south, where a settlement formed by the Hope and Saxon families became known as Pierceville. About this time, another community about 2 miles (3 km) northwest of Pierceville, named Melendez, was formed.

In 1850 a post office was established at Melendez, which in 1855 was listed as the Capital of Benton County, now Hernando County. In 1854 it was replaced by a post office at Pierceville. Both towns were situated in the area that would become Brooksville.

In 1856, the town of Brooksville was established by the merger of the towns of Melendez and Pierceville and served as the county seat of Hernando County. The name was chosen to honor Preston Brooks, a congressman who had caned abolitionist Senator Charles Sumner nearly to death in 1856 on the floor of the Senate after Sumner gave an anti-slavery speech and disparaged Brooks' uncle, Senator Andrew Butler.

The Pierceville post office was renamed Brooksville in 1871. The city of Brooksville was incorporated on October 13, 1880.

A study of lynchings recorded in Hernando County in the late 19th and early 20th centuries revealed it had one of the highest per capita rates of violence against blacks in the United States. In Brooksville, the county seat, several African-Americans were killed in the 1870s and 1920s. Arthur St. Clair, a community leader, was murdered in 1877 after he presided over an interracial marriage. After the murder, the investigation was stymied by local actions to prevent bringing to justice the white men accused in his killing.

Around 1885, there was a brief uprising by blacks, three of whom were killed and many others wounded by whites.

=== 20th century ===
The 1920s saw a resurgence of Ku Klux Klan activity and lynchings; as a result, many black residents left the area. During the Great Depression, Brooksville suffered from a lack of currency. The school board paid teachers with chits, and Weeks Hardware "accepted chickens and sides of bacon" as payment.

In the 1920s, Brooksville was a major citrus production area and was known as the "Home of the Tangerine".

In 1948, Brooksville instituted a zoning law segregating neighborhoods. Schools remained segregated until the late 1960s. An example of racism in the city was the creation of the "Lewis Plantation and Turpentine Still", which claimed to show life in African-American rural communities, but contained black residents dressing and acting in stereotypes to entertain white tourists.

=== 21st century ===
Brooksville is a residential-commercial community. There are several medical facilities in the area including Bayfront Health Brooksville, Oak Hill Community Hospital, and Bayfront Health Spring Hill. A campus of Pasco–Hernando State College is a mile north of the city limits. The business section includes eleven shopping centers, and Brooksville–Tampa Bay Regional Airport is 6 miles (10 km) south of the city. There are three city parks with walking trails, sports, and picnicking facilities, including a nine-hole golf course.

Jerome Brown, defensive tackle for the Philadelphia Eagles was a graduate of Brooksville's Hernando High School. In 1988, he received praise as he helped disperse a group of Ku Klux Klan protesters in Brooksville. Brown, and his 12-year-old nephew Gus, died on June 25, 1992, after Brown lost control of his car and crashed into a tree; Brown was 27 years old. In 2000, the Jerome Brown Community Center was opened in Brooksville in memory of Brown.

A minor controversy arose in the summer of 2010 when local media and residents brought attention to the origin of the town's name, calling it "shameful". The suggestion was made that the town should change its name to distance itself from its pro-slavery history. The idea was opposed by locals and not entertained by the city council. However, the city's official website did remove a page which discussed the Brooks/Sumner encounter and had cast Brooks in a positive light.

== Geography ==
Brooksville is in east-central Hernando County, 45 miles (72 km) north of Tampa and 51 miles (82 km) southwest of Ocala. The geographic center of Florida is 12 miles (19 km) north-northwest of Brooksville.

The city has a total area of 10.9 square miles (28.3 km^{2}), of which 10.8 square miles (28.1 km^{2}) are land and 0.12 square miles (0.3 km^{2}), or 0.90%, are water.

Brooksville is known for its rolling topography with elevations ranging from 100 ft to 180 ft. The highest elevation in the area is Chinsegut Hill, at 269 ft, over five and a half miles north of the city.

=== Climate ===
Climate data for Brooksville, Florida (Brooksville–Tampa Bay Regional Airport), 1991–2020 normals, extremes 1892–present
Month	Jan	Feb	Mar	Apr	May	Jun	Jul	Aug	Sep	Oct	Nov	Dec	Year
Record high °F (°C)	89 (32)	92 (33)	95 (35)	98 (37)	101 (38)	104 (40)	102 (39)	101 (38)	101 (38)	98 (37)	96 (36)	89 (32)	104 (40)
Mean maximum °F (°C)	82.6 (28.1)	84.2 (29.0)	86.9 (30.5)	90.4 (32.4)	94.5 (34.7)	95.3 (35.2)	95.3 (35.2)	95.1 (35.1)	93.8 (34.3)	91.1 (32.8)	86.9 (30.5)	83.3 (28.5)	96.8 (36.0)
Mean daily maximum °F (°C)	70.7 (21.5)	73.7 (23.2)	77.6 (25.3)	82.8 (28.2)	88.1 (31.2)	90.2 (32.3)	90.6 (32.6)	90.9 (32.7)	89.5 (31.9)	84.5 (29.2)	77.9 (25.5)	73.0 (22.8)	82.4 (28.0)
Daily mean °F (°C)	57.5 (14.2)	60.6 (15.9)	64.2 (17.9)	69.2 (20.7)	75.3 (24.1)	80.1 (26.7)	81.3 (27.4)	81.5 (27.5)	79.8 (26.6)	73.1 (22.8)	65.1 (18.4)	60.3 (15.7)	70.7 (21.5)
Mean daily minimum °F (°C)	44.3 (6.8)	47.5 (8.6)	50.8 (10.4)	55.7 (13.2)	62.6 (17.0)	69.9 (21.1)	72.0 (22.2)	72.1 (22.3)	70.1 (21.2)	61.7 (16.5)	52.3 (11.3)	47.6 (8.7)	58.9 (14.9)
Mean minimum °F (°C)	27.0 (−2.8)	29.3 (−1.5)	33.0 (0.6)	42.0 (5.6)	51.8 (11.0)	64.4 (18.0)	67.8 (19.9)	68.9 (20.5)	62.4 (16.9)	45.6 (7.6)	34.5 (1.4)	30.5 (−0.8)	24.2 (−4.3)
Record low °F (°C)	13 (−11)	16 (−9)	20 (−7)	30 (−1)	41 (5)	55 (13)	60 (16)	62 (17)	51 (11)	29 (−2)	22 (−6)	15 (−9)	13 (−11)
Average precipitation inches (mm)	3.01 (76)	2.57 (65)	2.66 (68)	2.18 (55)	3.35 (85)	7.91 (201)	9.41 (239)	8.12 (206)	5.79 (147)	2.79 (71)	1.59 (40)	2.56 (65)	51.94 (1,319)
Average precipitation days (≥ 0.01 in)	9.0	7.6	7.3	7.0	7.8	15.4	19.0	17.9	13.5	7.8	6.5	6.9	125.7
Source: NOAA

== Demographics ==
Historical population
Census	Pop.	Note	%±
1890	512		—
1900	641		25.2%
1910	979		52.7%
1920	1,011		3.3%
1930	1,405		39.0%
1940	1,607		14.4%
1950	1,818		13.1%
1960	3,301		81.6%
1970	4,060		23.0%
1980	5,582		37.5%
1990	7,440		33.3%
2000	7,264		−2.4%
2010	7,719		6.3%
2020	8,890		15.2%
U.S. Decennial Census

=== Racial and ethnic composition ===
Brooksville racial composition (Hispanics excluded from racial categories) (NH = Non-Hispanic)
Race	Pop 2010	Pop 2020	% 2010	% 2020
White (NH)	5,609	6,238	72.66%	70.17%
Black or African American (NH)	1,374	1,232	17.80%	13.86%
Native American or Alaska Native (NH)	28	37	0.36%	0.41%
Asian (NH)	71	67	0.92%	0.75%
Pacific Islander or Native Hawaiian (NH)	5	0	0.06%	0.00%
Some other race (NH)	10	22	0.13%	0.25%
Two or more races/Multiracial (NH)	113	354	1.46%	3.98%
Hispanic or Latino (any race)	509	940	6.59%	10.57%
Total	7,719	8,890		

=== 2020 census ===
As of the 2020 census, Brooksville had a population of 8,890. The median age was 48.0 years. 18.5% of residents were under the age of 18 and 28.7% of residents were 65 years of age or older. For every 100 females there were 85.4 males, and for every 100 females age 18 and over there were 81.3 males age 18 and over.

93.0% of residents lived in urban areas, while 7.0% lived in rural areas.

There were 4,052 households in Brooksville, of which 24.4% had children under the age of 18 living in them. Of all households, 34.9% were married-couple households, 18.0% were households with a male householder and no spouse or partner present, and 37.1% were households with a female householder and no spouse or partner present. About 35.1% of all households were made up of individuals and 17.6% had someone living alone who was 65 years of age or older.

There were 4,638 housing units, of which 12.6% were vacant. The homeowner vacancy rate was 2.4% and the rental vacancy rate was 13.7%. The 2020 ACS 5-year estimates reported 2,092 families residing in the city.

=== 2010 census ===
As of the 2010 United States census, there were 7,719 people, 3,606 households, and 1,867 families residing in the city.

=== 2000 census ===
As of the census of 2000, there were 7,264 people, 3,220 households, and 1,832 families residing in the city. The population density was 1,469.5 inhabitants per square mile (567.4/km^{2}). There were 3,920 occupied housing units at an average density of 793.0 units per square mile (306.2 units/km^{2}). The racial makeup of the city was 74.93% White, 21.31% African American, 0.36% Native American, 1.23% Asian, 0.00% Pacific Islander, 1.09% from other races, and 1.09% from two or more races. 3.07% of the population are Hispanic or Latino of any race.

In 2000, there were 3,220 households of which 23.7% had children under the age of 18 living with them, 39.9% were married couples living together, 14.0% had a female householder with no husband present, and 43.1% were non-families. 38.0% of all households were made up of individuals and 21.2% had someone living alone who was 65 years of age or older. The average household size was 2.14 and the average family size was 2.82.

In 2000, in the city, 22.1% of people were under the age of 18, 7.8% from 18 to 24, 21.7% from 25 to 44, 18.7% from 45 to 64, and 29.7% were 65 years of age or older. The median age was 44 years. For every 100 females, there were 80.2 males. For every 100 females age 18 and over, there were 76.4 males.

In 2000, the median income for a household in the city was $25,489, and the median income for a family was $31,060. Males had a median income of $29,837 versus $21,804 for females. The per capita income for the city was $16,265. About 16.8% of families and 21.5% of the population were below the poverty line, including 27.9% of those under age 18 and 11.5% of those age 65 or over.

== Tourism ==
The city hosted an annual Blueberry Festival in downtown Brooksville until 2017. The Festival then moved to Plant City.

The city has historic homes along brick streets. There is also a Native American outpost in a log cabin, the Brooksville Railroad Depot Museum, and The Hernando Heritage Museum, located in the May-Stringer House. The Historic Brooksville Walking/Driving Tour features many historic homes; a guidebook is available at the City of Brooksville website and at the main library on Howell Avenue.

The first annual "Get Healthy Brooksville Cycling Classic" was held in 2010 and attracted cyclists from all over the state.

The Brooksville Business Alliance has sponsored the annual Brooksville Founders Week Celebration since 2006.

== Public transportation ==
Brooksville is served by THE Bus's Purple and Green Routes.

== Media ==
- WWJB (1450 AM), radio station based in Brooksville
- The Hernando Times, an issue of the Tampa Bay Times, is published each Friday and The Hernando Sun Home, established in 2015, a locally owned newspaper covering Hernando County.

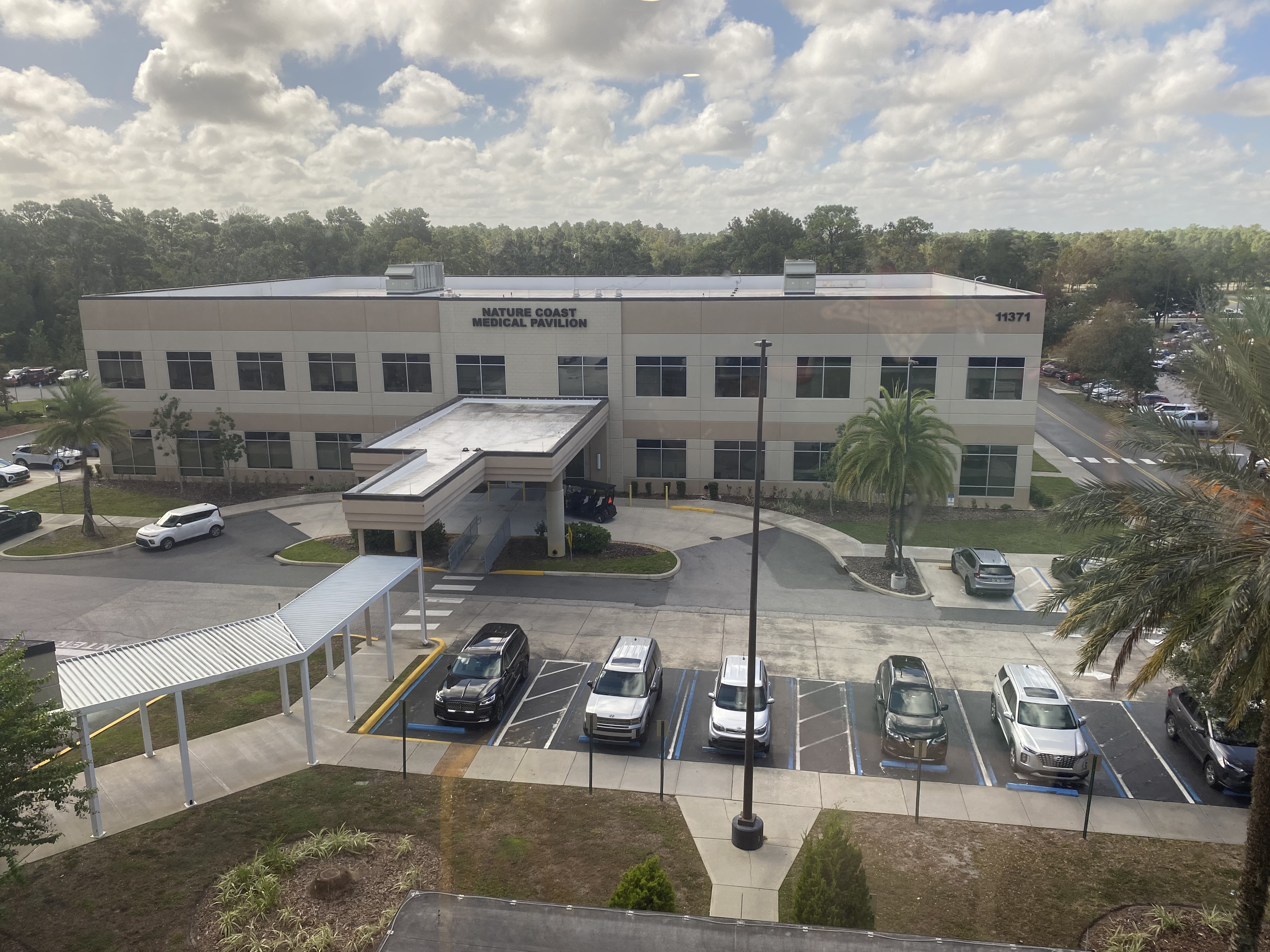
Nature Coast Medical Pavilion at HCA Florida Oak Hill Hospital in Brooksville

== Healthcare ==
There are two hospitals in Brooksville, TGH Brooksville and HCA Florida Oak Hill Hospital.

== Notable people ==
- Tammy Alexander, murder victim known as "Caledonia Jane Doe", disappeared from Brooksville in 1979
- Bronson Arroyo, former MLB pitcher; pitched for Hernando High School and graduated in 1995
- Jerome Brown, former NFL defensive tackle for the Philadelphia Eagles
- John Capel, former sprinter and professional NFL player
- Paul Farmer, co-founder of international social justice and health organization Partners in Health
- Wayne Garrett, former MLB infielder, member of the 1969 "Miracle Mets"
- Mike Hampton, former MLB pitcher; born in Brooksville
- DuJuan Harris, former Central High (Brooksville) standout and former NFL running back
- William Sherman Jennings, governor of Florida 1901–1905
- George Lowe, television actor, grew up in Brooksville, worked for WWJB AM 1450, a local radio station
- Bill McCollum, U.S. congressman and Florida Attorney General; birthplace and childhood home
- Maulty Moore, former NFL defensive tackle for the Miami Dolphins, Cincinnati Bengals, and Tampa Bay Buccaneers
- Tori Murden, the first woman to row solo across the Atlantic Ocean, and to ski to the geographic South Pole
- Jon Oliva, Savatage frontman and Trans-Siberian Orchestra composer
- Todd Rogers, retired professional videogame player
- Taylor Rotunda, current WWE wrestler, better known as Uncle Howdy
- Windham Rotunda, former WWE wrestler, better known as Bray Wyatt
- John A. Sabatini, member of the Rhode Island Senate
- Donald Sanborn, a sedevacantist Catholic bishop; currently lives at Most Holy Trinity Seminary, in Brooksville
- Stephen M. Sparkman, a member of the U.S. House of Representatives from Florida
- Hughie Thomasson, guitarist and leader of the Outlaws

== Cultural ==
- Bob Clark's 1974 horror film Deathdream was filmed entirely in Brooksville.
