= St. Joseph Academy (Florida) =

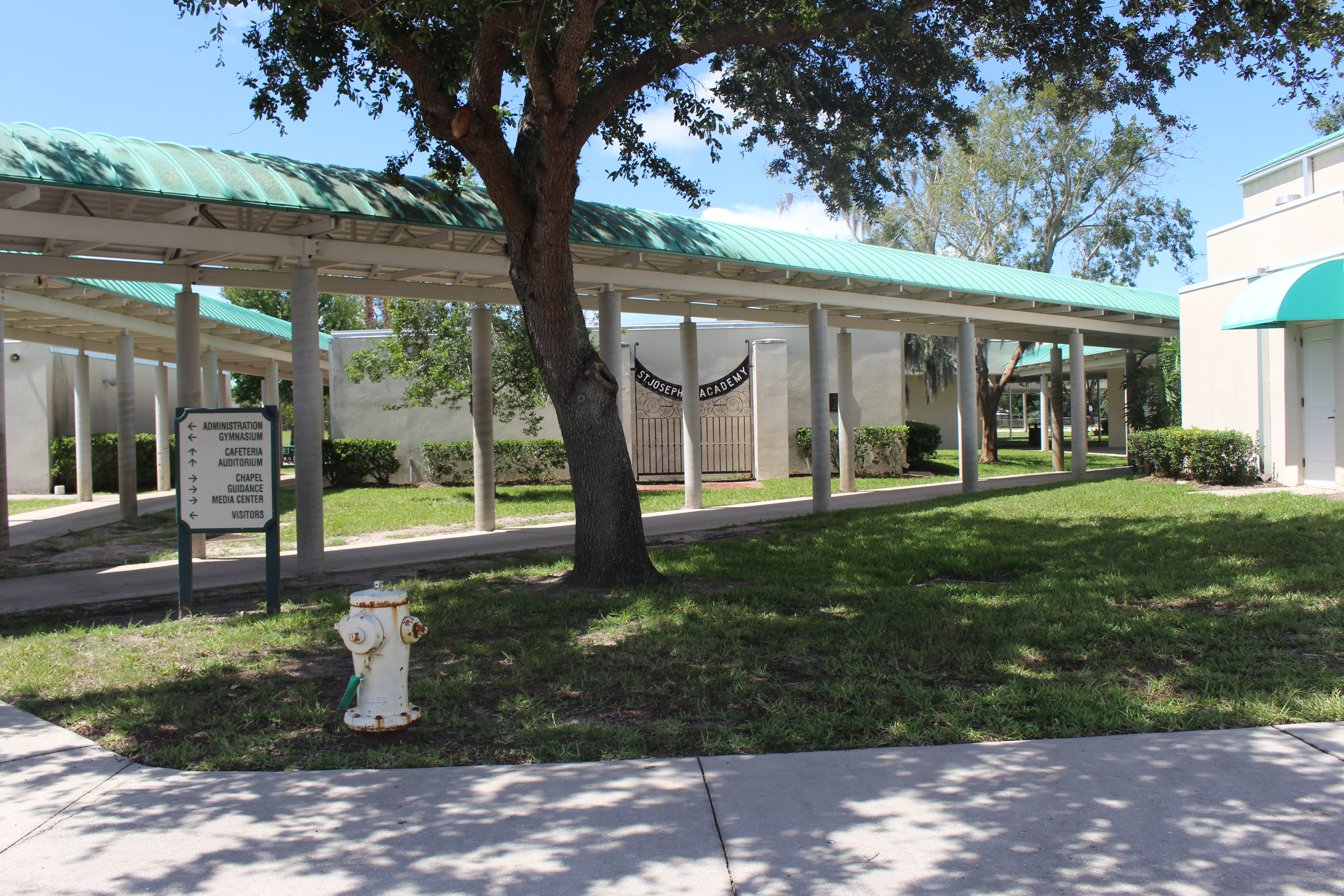

Location
- 155 State Road 207; St. Augustine, (St. Johns County), Florida 32084; United States; 29°52′52″N 81°19′49″W

Information
- School type: Private, College-prep, Catholic High School
- Motto: Latin: Virtus et Scientia (Virtue and Knowledge)
- Religious affiliation: Roman Catholic
- Established: 1866
- Founders: Sisters of St. Joseph
- Superintendent: Deacon Scott Conway
- CEEB code: 101480
- President: Rev. Michael Houle
- Principal: Todd DeClemente
- Staff: 11
- Faculty: 20
- Teaching staff: 26
- Grades: 9–12
- Gender: Coeducational
- Student to teacher ratio: 13:1
- Hours in school day: 6-7 hours
- Colors: Hunter Green and Vegas Gold
- Mascot: Flashes
- Accreditation: Southern Association of Colleges and Schools
- Newspaper: News Flash
- Yearbook: The Guardian
- Tuition: $9,014 - $25,239 (Catholic) $10,067 - $28,188 (Non-Catholic)
- Feeder schools: Cathedral Parish School, St. Elizabeth Ann Seton, St. Joseph (Mandarin), San Juan Del Rio
- Dean of Students: Scott Sekeres
- Admissions Director: Kristin Grover
- Website: www.sjaweb.org

St. Joseph Academy Catholic High School is a private Catholic high school in unincorporated St. Johns County, Florida (with a St. Augustine postal address). It is located in and administered by the Roman Catholic Diocese of St. Augustine. The oldest Catholic high school in Florida, it was founded in 1866.

== History ==
Nearly 70% of students participate on athletic teams: Football, Basketball, Soccer, Volleyball, Baseball, Softball, Swimming, Cross Country, Golf, Track, Cheerleading, Tennis and Lacrosse.

== Class of 2013 statistics ==
The Saint Joseph Academy class of 2013 was 58 students, who matriculated as follows:

Accepted to college 100% (13th consecutive year)
Percentage graduated with honors 76%
Florida Bright Futures 58%
Scholarship money earned $3+ million
Community service hours 13,550+

Class of 2013 - SAT Composites

SJA Top 10%	1960
SJA Top 25%	1834
SJA Top 50%	1730
SJA Top 75%	1651
St. Johns County	1575
Florida	1487
National	1498

Class of 2013 - ACT Mean Scores

SJA Top 10%	28.7
SJA Top 25%	28.1
SJA Top 50%	26.8
SJA Top 75%	25
SJA Top 100%	23.2
Florida	19.6
National	20.9
