= William Sherman Jennings =

18th Governor of Florida from 1901 to 1905 (1863–1920)

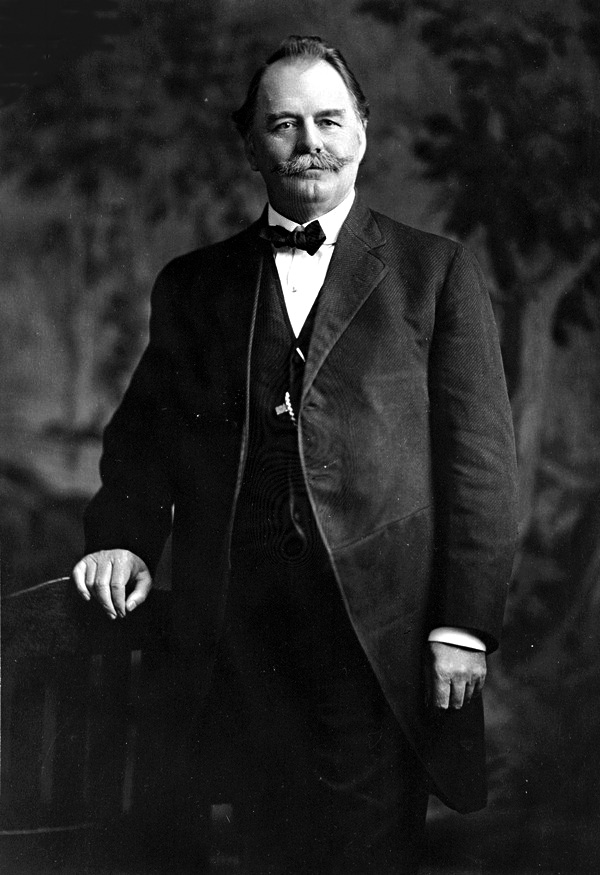

18th Governor of Florida
- In office January 8, 1901 – January 3, 1905
- Preceded by: William D. Bloxham
- Succeeded by: Napoleon B. Broward

Speaker of the Florida House of Representatives
- In office 1895
- Preceded by: John L. Gaskins
- Succeeded by: Dannitte Hill Mays

Member of the Florida House of Representatives
- In office 1893–1897

Personal details
- Born: March 24, 1863 Walnut Hill, Illinois, U.S.
- Died: February 27, 1920 (aged 56) St. Augustine, Florida, U.S.
- Party: Democratic
- Spouse: May Mann (m. 1891)
- Children: 1
- Relatives: William Jennings Bryan (first cousin); Charles W. Bryan (first cousin)
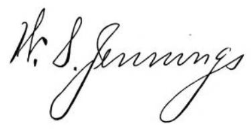
- Signature

William Sherman Jennings (March 24, 1863 – February 27, 1920) was an American progressive politician who served as the 18th governor of Florida after being a lawyer, county judge, and state representative.

== Early years and education ==
He was born near Walnut Hill, Illinois, and attended public schools in Marion County. Jennings graduated from Southern Illinois University in 1883, then studied law at the Union College of Law in Chicago (now named Northwestern University School of Law). He finished his law studies in Chicago under the supervision of his brother, Charles E. Jennings, who was the State Attorney for Marion County.

== Florida ==
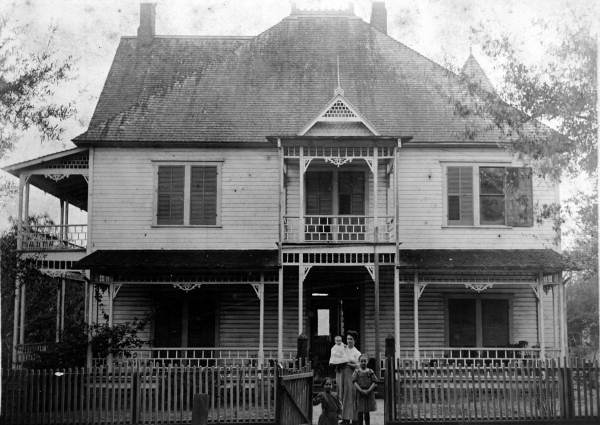
Governor William S. Jennings House in Brooksville, Florida

He came to Florida in 1885 and settled in Brooksville, Florida. In 1887, he was appointed circuit court commissioner, and became county judge of Hernando County, Florida, in 1888.

== State office ==
Jennings resigned his office as county judge in 1893 to serve in the Florida House of Representatives, eventually becoming Speaker of the Florida House of Representatives in 1895. After his term ended, he served as a colonel in the Florida militia, was president of the Brooksville town council and chairman of the Democratic committee.

Jennings campaigned for and was elected governor in 1900, taking the oath of office on January 8, 1901. During his term in office, he introduced the statewide primary election system, replacing the previous method of nominating candidates for political office at a convention. The first statewide primary election was conducted in 1902. It was also Jennings idea to drain and develop the Everglades by cutting the natural rock dams in the rivers of south Florida. His term ended on January 3, 1905.

== Remaining years ==
He moved to Jacksonville, then Florida's largest city, where he established a successful law practice. He divided his time between a home in Jacksonville and a farm and timber holdings in Clay County near Middleburg.

In 1905, he was appointed by Governor Napoleon B. Broward as general counsel for the Internal Improvement Fund, the state agency responsible for administering public lands. The new governor also favored the development of the Everglades, so in this position, which Jennings held until 1909, he was able to continue leading drainage activities in the Everglades.

== Family ==
Jennings met May Mann at her father's home near Brooksville, and began a courtship. May's father, Austin Mann, had been a Florida Senator and had just won election to the state house of representatives. When the legislative session began in January, 1891, May went to Tallahassee to serve as her father's aide, with responsibility for her father's appointments, correspondence and hosting social events. Jennings went to Tallahassee to continue his courtship. He married May Mann on May 12, 1891, and they were escorted down the aisle by the full legislative membership. The newlyweds lived in Brooksville in the William Sherman Jennings House. The couple had one child, a son, Sherman Bryan Jennings.

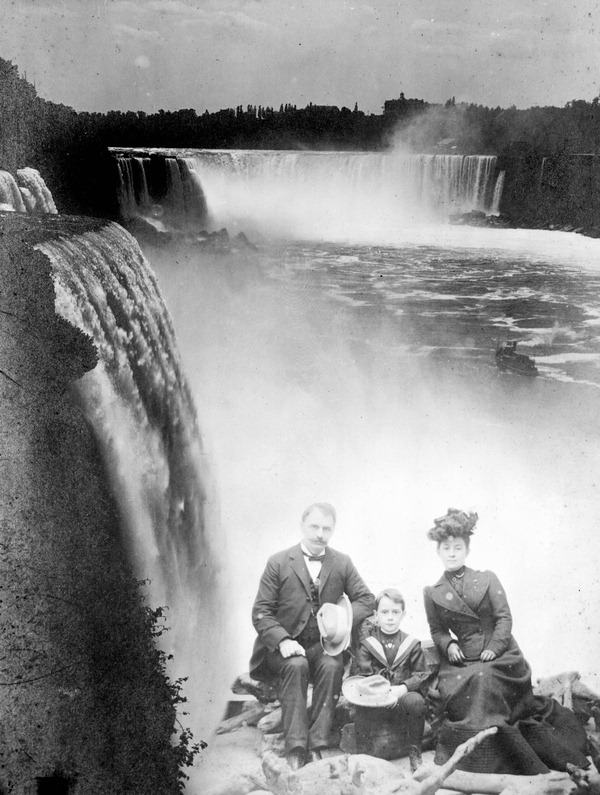
Jennings family at Niagara Falls

Politics and the law were prominent in his family. In addition to his brother, who was a lawyer and state attorney, he was a first cousin to William Jennings Bryan, congressman and three-time Democratic presidential nominee.

== Civic activities ==
Jennings served as a trustee of Stetson University during the first decade of the twentieth century and was involved in the controversy over whether the Florida Baptist Convention would elect the trustees of the university. At one point, the controversy became so heated that Jennings and Lincoln Hulley, the president of the university, engaged in a fistfight in the lobby of the Leon Hotel in Tallahassee, Florida.

== Death ==
Jennings died on February 27, 1920, in St. Augustine, Florida, and was buried in Jacksonville, Florida.

== Legacy and honors ==
The World War II Liberty Ship SS W. S. Jennings was named in his honor.

Party political offices
Preceded by William D. Bloxham	Democratic nominee for Governor of Florida; 1900	Succeeded by Napoleon B. Broward
Political offices
Preceded by William D. Bloxham	Governor of Florida; January 8, 1901 – January 3, 1905	Succeeded by Napoleon B. Broward
