= Withlacoochee State Forest =

Forest in Florida

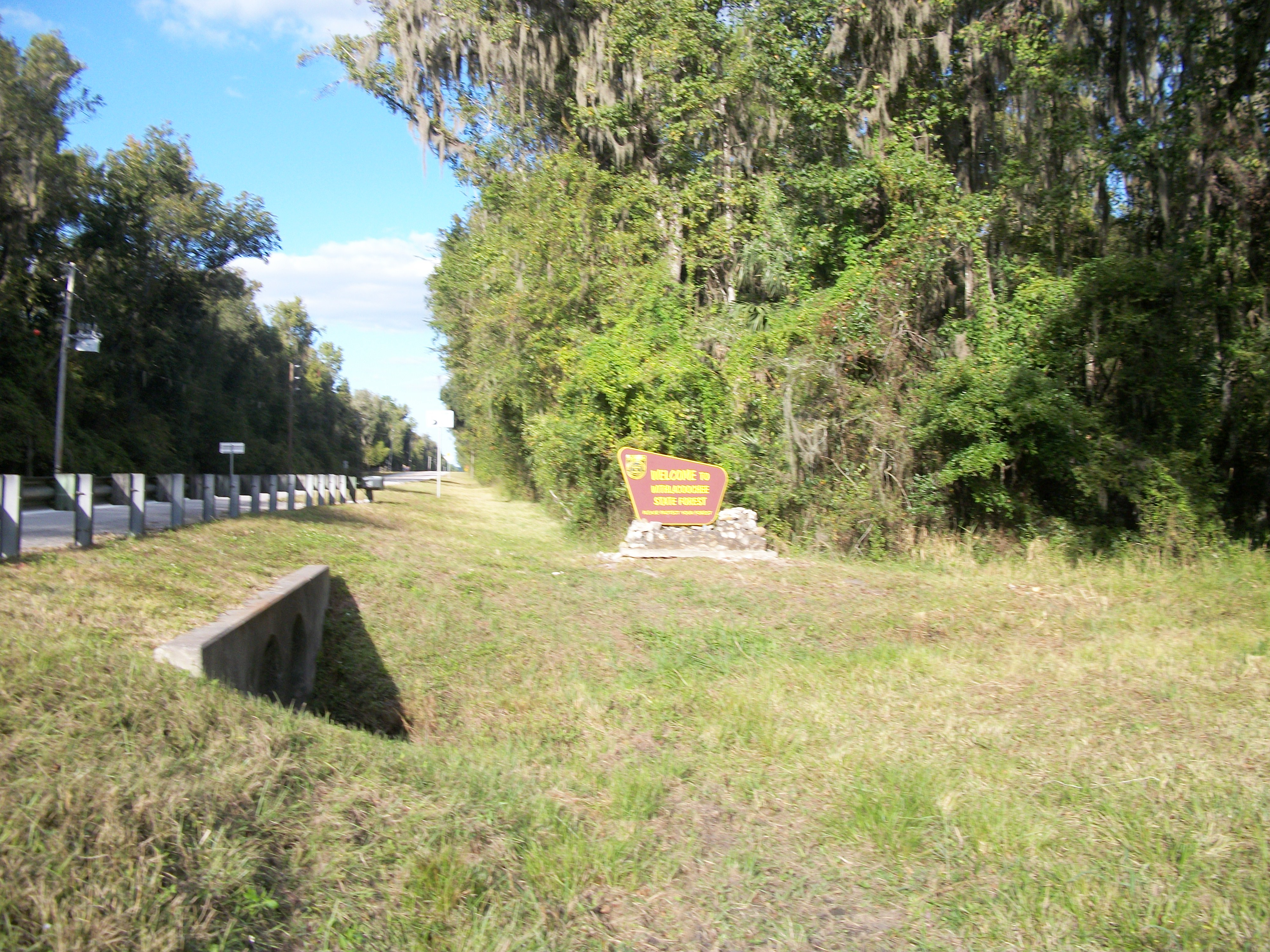
- Northbound entrance sign on US 41
- Interactive map of Withlacoochee State Forest
- Location: Citrus, Pasco, Hernando and Sumter counties, Florida
- Nearest city: Inverness
- Area: 157,479 acres (63,729 ha)
- Governing body: Florida Forest Service

The Withlacoochee State Forest is 157,479-acre (637 km^{2}) in the western central part in the US state of Florida, near Lecanto, Inverness, Floral City, Brooksville, Ridge Manor, and Dade City. The forest was named for the Withlacoochee River, which passes through some of the major tracts within.

== History ==
Withlacoochee State Forest was acquired by the federal government from private landowners between 1936 and 1939 under the provisions of the U.S. Land Resettlement Administration. The land acquired by the government would be named the Withlacoochee Development Service. The lands were managed by the Soil Conservation Service from 1939 to 1954. The U.S. Forest Service managed the property until a lease-purchase agreement transferred the property to the Florida Board of Forestry in 1958.

Ghost towns within the community include Mannfield, Orleans, Oak Grove, Stage Pond, Croom, Rital, Richloam, Clay Sink, and others. Historic sites within the forest include the Etna Turpentine Camp Archeological Site and Richloam General Store and Post Office.

== Tracts ==
The state forest includes seven wildlife management areas.

- Citrus Wildlife Management Area (WMA): Nearly 50,000 acres (20,000 ha) in Citrus and Hernando counties. One of the tracts that make up the Withlacoochee State Forest.
- Croom Wildlife Management Area (WMA): Located in Hernando and Sumter encompassing more than 20,000 acres (8,100 ha) within the Withlacoochee State Forest.
- Homosassa WMA: 5,000 acres (2,000 ha) in a management unit of the Withlacoochee State Forest located in Citrus County.
- Jumper Creek Wildlife Management Area 10,000 acres (4,000 ha) within the state park.
- Richloam WMA: One of the seven tracts of the state forest. It consists of 58,000 acres (23,000 ha) in Hernando, Pasco, Sumter, and Lake Counties.
  - Richloam WMA, Baird Unit: More than 11,000 acres (4,500 ha) and one of the seven tracts of the Withlacoochee State Forest.
- Two Mile Prairie tract: The Two Mile Prairie tract is 2,896 acres (1,172 ha) within the Withlacoochee State Forest. It is owned by the State of Florida and the Southwest Florida Water Management District. It includes the Bearhead Hammock trail and a primitive campsite, available by reservation. The trail has an 8.3-mile looped horse trail with campsites along the route. The Oxbow trailhead, a paddle-in campsite for kayakers and canoers, does not need a reservation for primitive camping. The 3/4 mile (1.2 km) Oxbow loop hiking trail does not allow horses and bicycles. The 2.6 miles (4.2 km) Johnson Pond loop trail also does not allow horses and bicycles.

== Recreation ==
The World Wildlife Fund listed the Withlacoochee State Forest as one of the "10 Coolest Places You've Never Been in North America" by the World Wildlife Fund. Activities include miles of trails for hiking, bicycling, horseback riding and canoeing. It includes several separate land tracts with many natural communities and habitats for wildlife. These tracts consist of the Two Mile Prairie Tract, the Homosassa Tract, the Citrus Tract, the Juniper Creek Tract, the Croom Tract, and the Richloam Tract. The Croom Motorcycle Area is designated for off-road vehicle use. There are recreation activities for the use of visitors. Many hiking trails run through the forest including, but not limited to the Florida Trail, the Withlacoochee State Trail, the Good Neighbor Trail, and the General James A. Van Fleet State Trail. The many tree species in dense forests include slash pine, longleaf pine, pond cypress, bald cypress, oak, maple, and others, providing dense canopy trails for visitors.

== See also ==
- Homosassa Springs Wildlife State Park
- Lake Townsen Regional Park
- Nobleton Wayside Park
- Cypress Lake Preserve
