= Etna Turpentine Camp Archeological Site =

Historic site in the Withlacoochee State Forest, Citrus County, Florida

- U.S. National Register of Historic Places
- Location within Florida Location within the United States
- Location: Inverness vicinity, Florida
- Coordinates: 28.709°N 82.508°W
- NRHP reference No.: 09001055
- Added to NRHP: December 10, 2009

The Etna Turpentine Camp Archeological Site is an abandoned turpentine camp near Inverness, Florida. Records indicate it was built in the early 1900s. It was discovered by accident when the Florida Gas Transmission Company was exploring a route for a possible pipeline. The site was added to the National Register of Historic Places on December 10, 2009. The site is within territory held by the Citrus Tract of the Withlacoochee State Forest.

In mid-2018, construction of an extension of the Suncoast Parkway which was to go through this site was stopped abruptly due to lawsuits filed. The injunction halting construction was lifted less than a month later, allowing construction to proceed.
