= Inverness Highlands South, Florida =

Census-designated place in Florida, United States

Inverness Highlands South
- Census-designated place
- Location in Citrus County and the state of Florida
- Coordinates: 28°48′02″N 82°20′14″W
- Country: United States
- State: Florida
- County: Citrus

Area
  - Total: 5.61 sq mi (14.54 km^{2})
  - Land: 5.61 sq mi (14.52 km^{2})
  - Water: 0.0039 sq mi (0.01 km^{2})
- Elevation: 49 ft (15 m)

Population (2020)
  - Total: 6,698
  - Density: 1,194.4/sq mi (461.15/km^{2})
- Time zone: UTC-5 (Eastern (EST))
  - Summer (DST): UTC-4 (EDT)
- FIPS code: 12-33966
- GNIS feature ID: 2402618

Inverness Highlands South is a census-designated place (CDP) in Citrus County, Florida, United States. As of the 2020 census, the population was 6,698, up from 6,542 at the 2010 census. It is part of the Homosassa Springs, Florida Metropolitan Statistical Area.

== Geography ==
Inverness Highlands South is located in eastern Citrus County along the southern border of the city of Inverness, the county seat. The western edge of the CDP runs along the border of Withlacoochee State Forest.

According to the United States Census Bureau, the CDP has a total area of 5.6 square miles (14.6 km^{2}), of which 0.012 square miles (0.03 km^{2}), or 0.21%, is water.

== Demographics ==
Historical population
Census	Pop.	Note	%±
2000	5,781		—
2010	6,542		13.2%
2020	6,698		2.4%
U.S. Decennial Census

=== 2020 census ===
As of the 2020 census, Inverness Highlands South had a population of 6,698. The median age was 50.3 years. 18.0% of residents were under the age of 18 and 27.3% of residents were 65 years of age or older. For every 100 females there were 92.5 males, and for every 100 females age 18 and over there were 89.1 males age 18 and over.

97.0% of residents lived in urban areas, while 3.0% lived in rural areas.

There were 2,933 households in Inverness Highlands South, of which 23.3% had children under the age of 18 living in them. Of all households, 46.7% were married-couple households, 17.0% were households with a male householder and no spouse or partner present, and 28.9% were households with a female householder and no spouse or partner present. About 30.2% of all households were made up of individuals and 16.5% had someone living alone who was 65 years of age or older.

There were 3,195 housing units, of which 8.2% were vacant. The homeowner vacancy rate was 2.4% and the rental vacancy rate was 8.2%.

Racial composition as of the 2020 census
Race	Number	Percent
White	5,830	87.0%
Black or African American	138	2.1%
American Indian and Alaska Native	17	0.3%
Asian	131	2.0%
Native Hawaiian and Other Pacific Islander	2	0.0%
Some other race	102	1.5%
Two or more races	478	7.1%
Hispanic or Latino (of any race)	490	7.3%

=== 2000 census ===
As of the census of 2000, there were 5,781 people, 2,557 households, and 1,792 families residing in the CDP. The population density was 1,024.6 inhabitants per square mile (395.6/km^{2}). There were 2,747 housing units at an average density of 486.8 per square mile (188.0/km^{2}). The racial makeup of the CDP was 95.83% White, 1.73% African American, 0.35% Native American, 0.69% Asian, 0.02% Pacific Islander, 0.57% from other races, and 0.81% from two or more races. Hispanic or Latino of any race were 4.95% of the population.

There were 2,557 households, out of which 21.4% had children under the age of 18 living with them, 58.7% were married couples living together, 8.5% had a female householder with no husband present, and 29.9% were non-families. 26.6% of all households were made up of individuals, and 17.1% had someone living alone who was 65 years of age or older. The average household size was 2.25 and the average family size was 2.66.

In the CDP, the population was spread out, with 19.1% under the age of 18, 4.7% from 18 to 24, 21.3% from 25 to 44, 21.5% from 45 to 64, and 33.4% who were 65 years of age or older. The median age was 50 years. For every 100 females, there were 88.4 males. For every 100 females age 18 and over, there were 84.6 males.

The median income for a household in the CDP was $28,289, and the median income for a family was $34,647. Males had a median income of $27,742 versus $23,097 for females. The per capita income for the CDP was $19,362. About 6.3% of families and 9.0% of the population were below the poverty line, including 18.5% of those under age 18 and 7.4% of those age 65 or over.

== Education ==
The CDP is served by Citrus County Schools. Elementary schools serving sections of the CDP include Inverness and Pleasant Grove. All residents are zoned to Inverness Middle School, and Citrus High School.
