= Pineola =

Pineola may refer to:

- Pineola, North Carolina
- Pineola, Florida
- Pineola, a track from Lucinda Williams' album Sweet Old World
