= Istachatta, Florida =

- Census-designated place
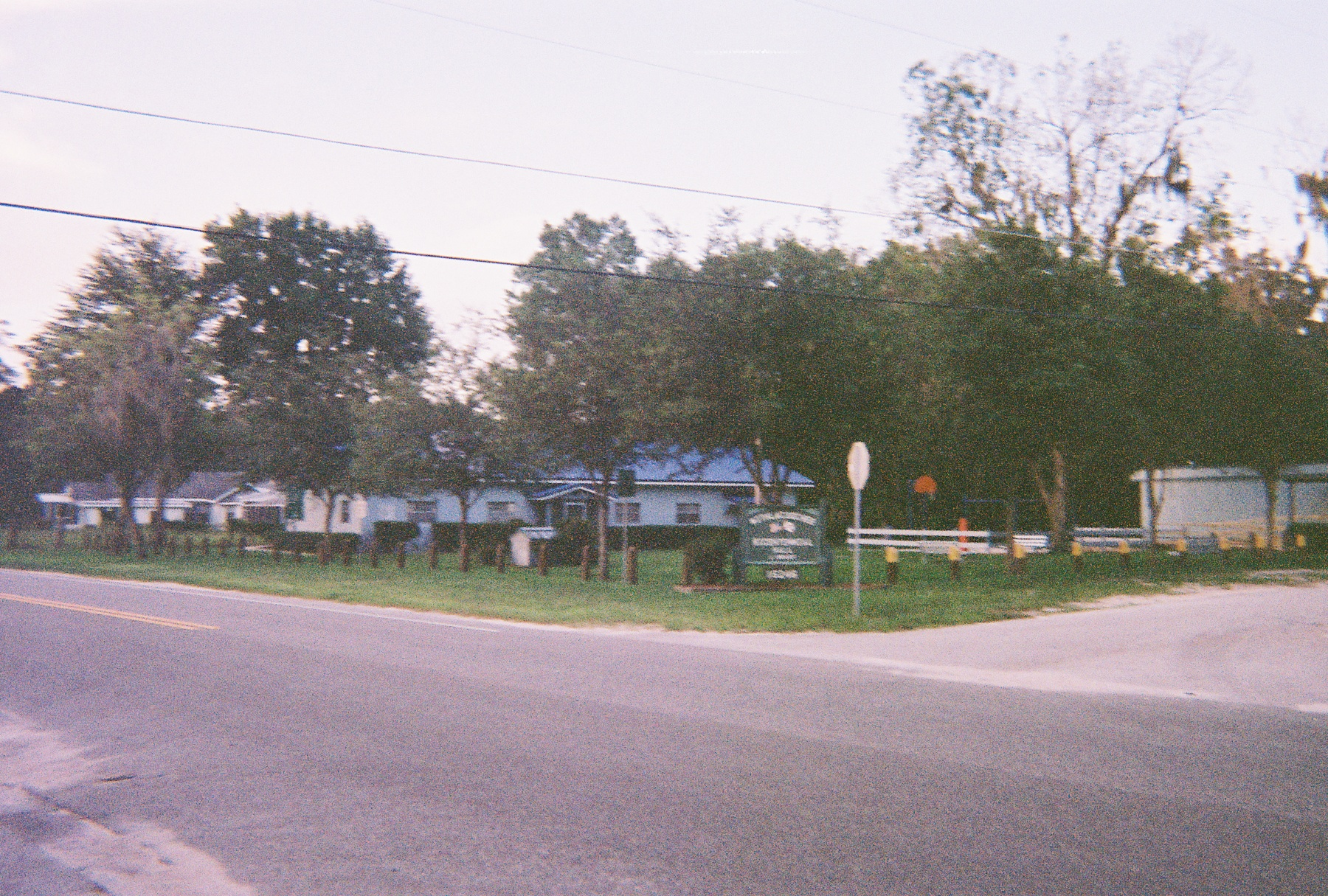
- The Istachatta community center and Hernando County Public Library on the corner of CR 439 and Magnon Drive

- Location in Hernando County and the state of Florida
- Coordinates: 28°39′48″N 82°16′21″W
- Country: United States
- State: Florida
- County: Hernando

Area
  - Total: 0.35 sq mi (0.91 km^{2})
  - Land: 0.31 sq mi (0.79 km^{2})
  - Water: 0.046 sq mi (0.12 km^{2})
- Elevation: 46 ft (14 m)

Population (2020)
  - Total: 126
  - Density: 411.6/sq mi (158.91/km^{2})
- Time zone: UTC-5 (Eastern (EST))
  - Summer (DST): UTC-4 (EDT)
- ZIP code: 34636
- Area code: 352
- FIPS code: 12-34275
- GNIS feature ID: 2402624

Istachatta is an unincorporated community and census-designated place (CDP) in Hernando County, Florida, United States. As of the 2020 census, Istachatta had a population of 126. The name "Istachatta" is derived from a Seminole word meaning "man snake".

== Geography ==
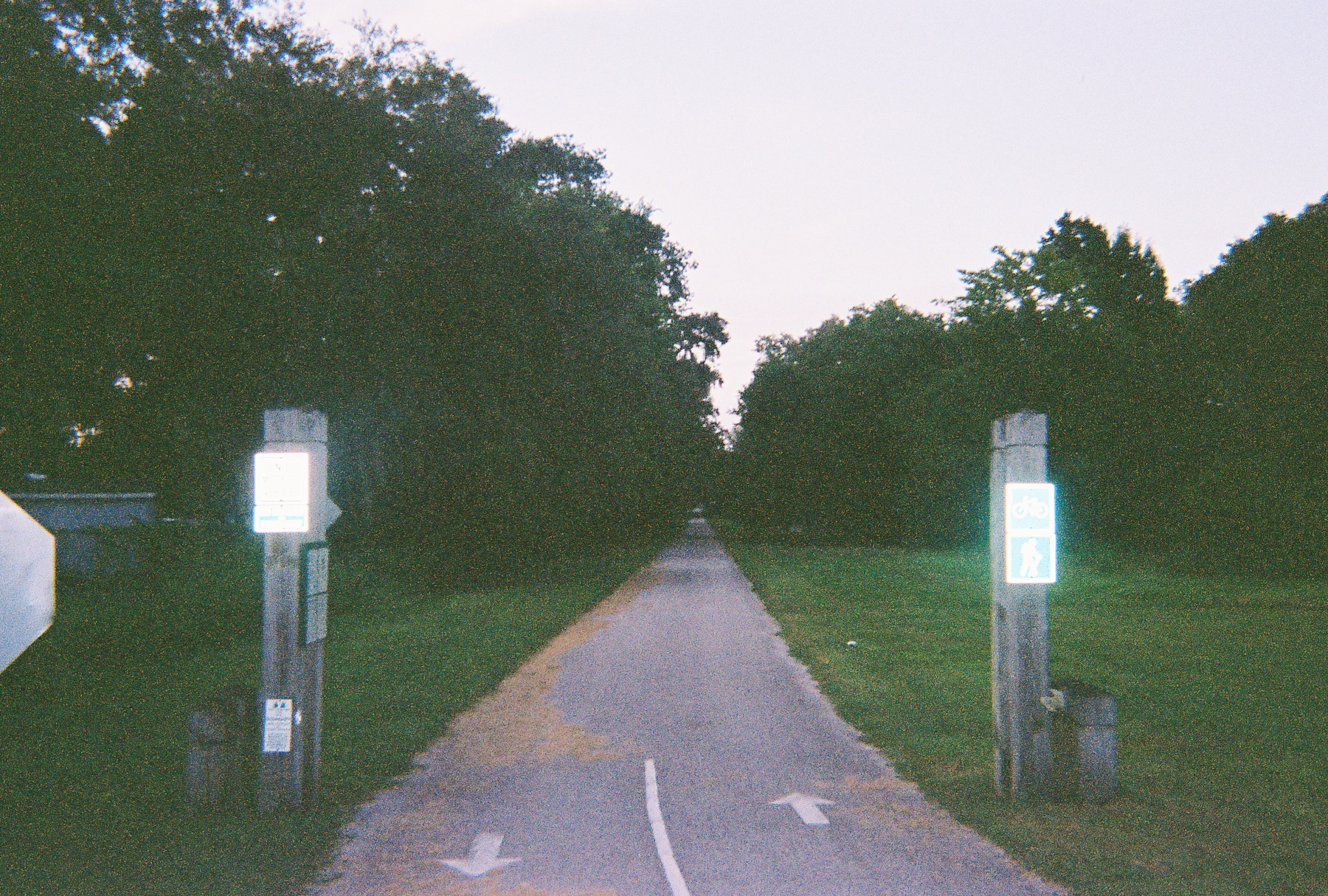
The Withlacoochee State Trail facing south from the Magnon Drive crossing in Istachatta, Florida.

The Withlacoochee State Trail facing south from the Magnon Drive crossing in Istachatta is in the northeast corner of Hernando County. It is on the west bank of the Withlacoochee River. It is 11 miles (18 km) northeast of Brooksville, the Hernando County seat, and 14 miles (23 km) south of Inverness.

According to the United States Census Bureau, the CDP has a total area of 0.3 square miles (0.9 km^{2}), of which 0.3 square miles (0.8 km^{2}) are land and 0.04 square miles (0.1 km^{2}), or 13.27%, are water. The town is along the Withlacoochee State Trail, a rail trail that extends north into Citrus and south to Pasco County.

== Demographics ==
Historical population
Census	Pop.	Note	%±
2020	126		—
U.S. Decennial Census

As of the census of 2000, there were 65 people, 34 households, and 22 families residing in the CDP. The population density was 505.4 inhabitants per square mile (195.1/km^{2}). There were 52 housing units at an average density of 404.4 per square mile (156.1/km^{2}). The racial makeup of the CDP was 93.85% White, 4.62% African American, and 1.54% from two or more races. Hispanic or Latino of any race were 3.08% of the population.

There were 34 households, out of which 8.8% had children under the age of 18 living with them, 44.1% were married couples living together, 20.6% had a female householder with no husband present, and 32.4% were non-families. 23.5% of all households were made up of individuals, and 14.7% had someone living alone who was 65 years of age or older. The average household size was 1.91 and the average family size was 2.22.

In the CDP, the population was spread out, with 7.7% under the age of 18, 3.1% from 18 to 24, 9.2% from 25 to 44, 38.5% from 45 to 64, and 41.5% who were 65 years of age or older. The median age was 57 years. For every 100 females, there were 97.0 males. For every 100 females age 18 and over, there were 87.5 males.

The median income for a household in the CDP was $21,250, and the median income for a family was $21,250. Males had a median income of $0 versus $13,750 for females. The per capita income for the CDP was $12,618. There were 33.3% of families and 29.5% of the population living below the poverty line, including 100.0% of under eighteens and none of those over 64.

== See also ==
- Lake Townsen Regional Park
