= Holder, Florida =

Human settlement in Florida, United States

Coordinates: 28°58′01″N 82°25′14″W

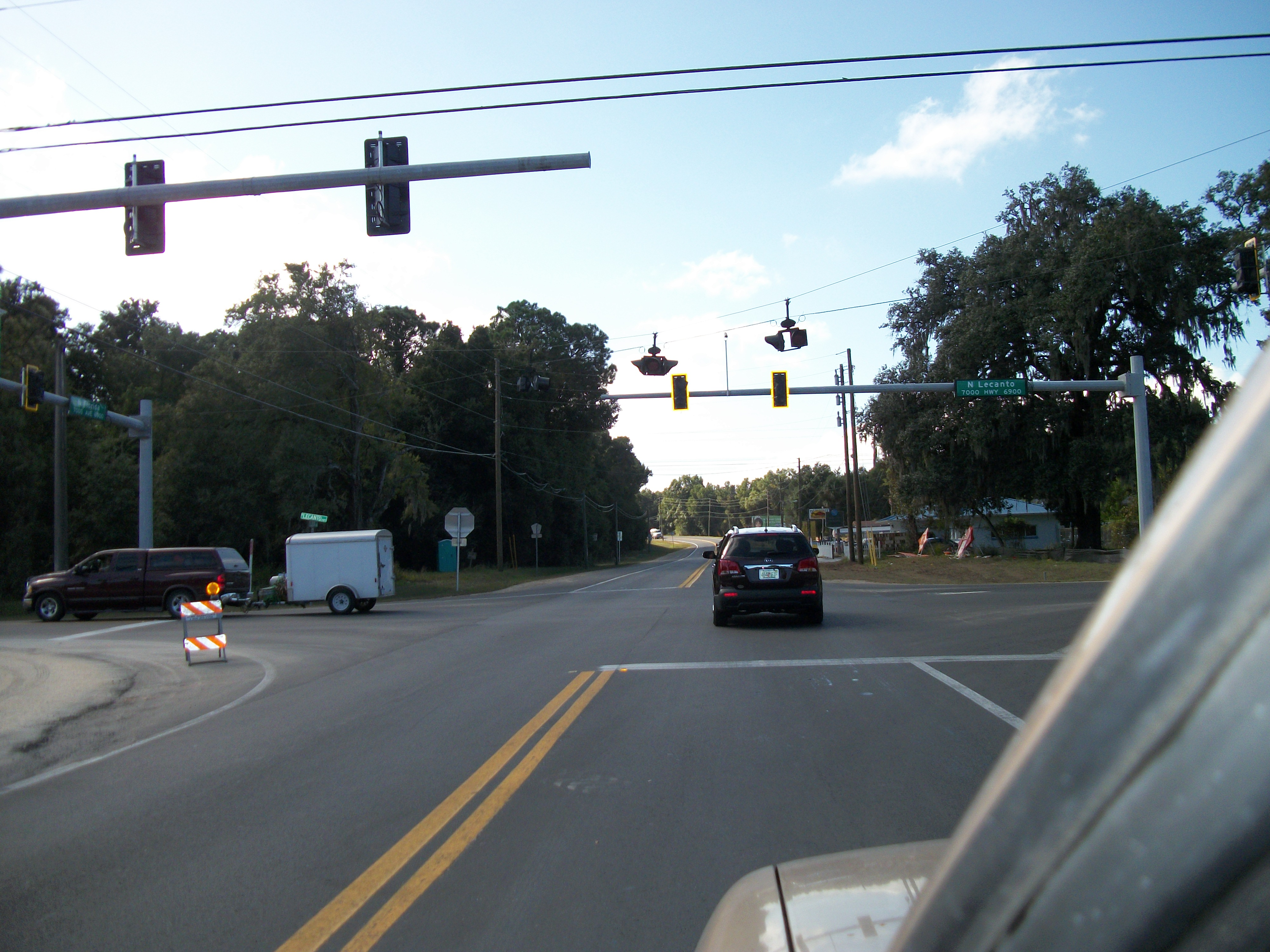
Southbound US 41 at CR 491 in Holder, Florida; October 27, 2010.

Holder is an unincorporated community in Citrus County, Florida, United States. Holder is located around the intersection of U.S. Route 41 and County Road 491 (North Lecanto Highway). West of this intersection is a crossing for the Withlacoochee State Trail. The ZIP Code for Holder is 34445.
