= Nobleton Wayside Park =

Park in Nobleton, Florida, United States

Coordinates: 28.64676°N 82.26271°W

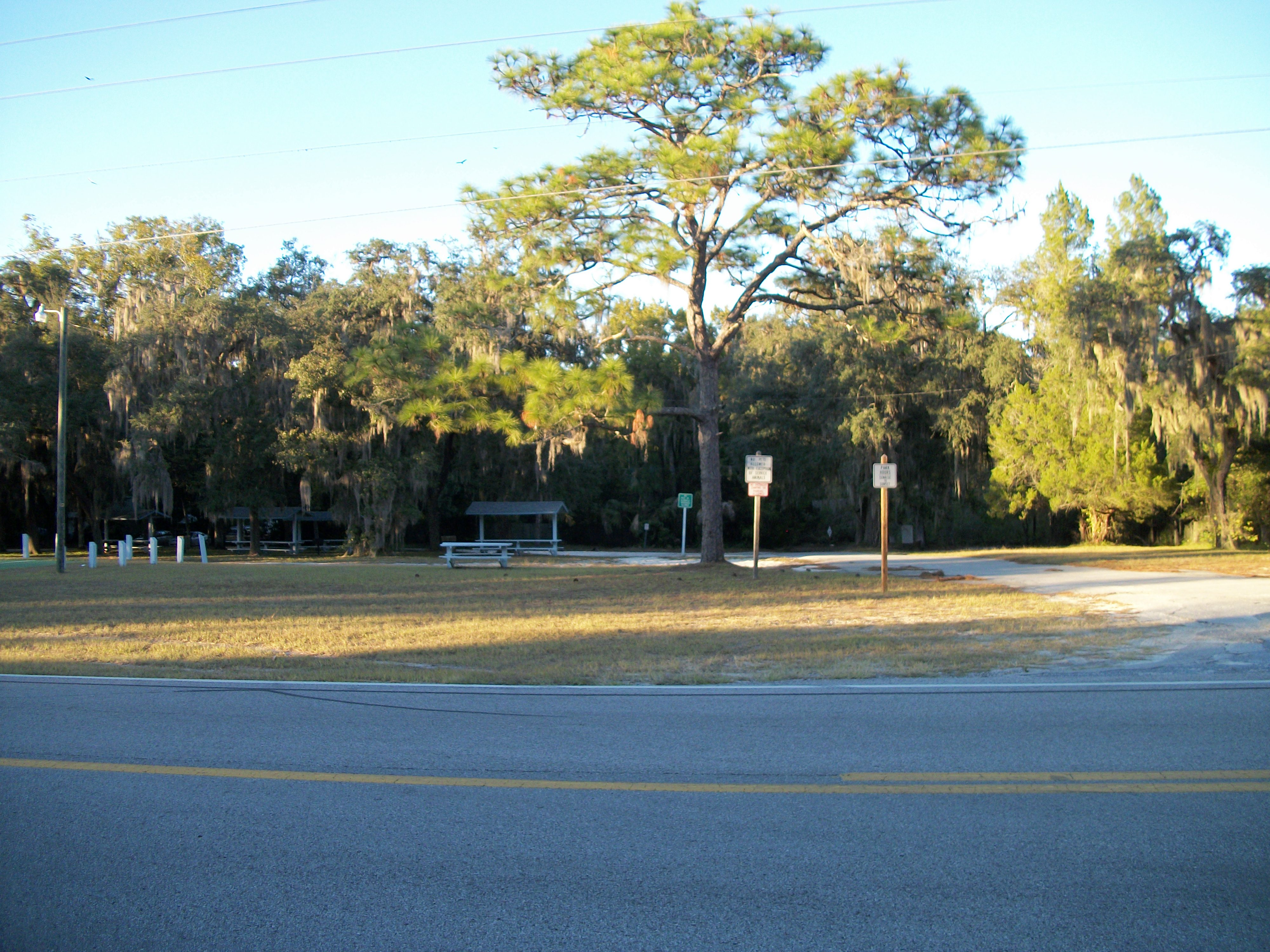
Nobleton Wayside Park as seen from across County Road 476.

Nobleton Wayside Park a 2-acre (8,100 m^{2}) park at 29061 Lamkin Drive in Nobleton, Florida that includes a boat ramp launching point on the Withlacoochee River as well as a shelter, basketball court, and picnic tables. Lamkin Drive is a loop road along the north side of County Road 476, the east end of which is at the intersection of Edgewater Avenue, which was once part of State Road 39. The park is across from the Nobleton Post Office, and between the crossing of the Withlacoochee State Trail and the Nobleton Outpost recreational area.
