= Meadowcrest, Florida =

Human settlement in United States

Coordinates: 28.8797°N 82.5382°W

Meadowcrest is an unincorporated community in Citrus County, Florida, United States. It is located in the western part of the county, to the east of Crystal River, between State Road 44 and County Road 486 (West Norvelle Bryant Highway).
