= Hardy Trail =

Recreational trail in Dade City, Florida, US

Coordinates: 28°21′47″N 82°11′25″W

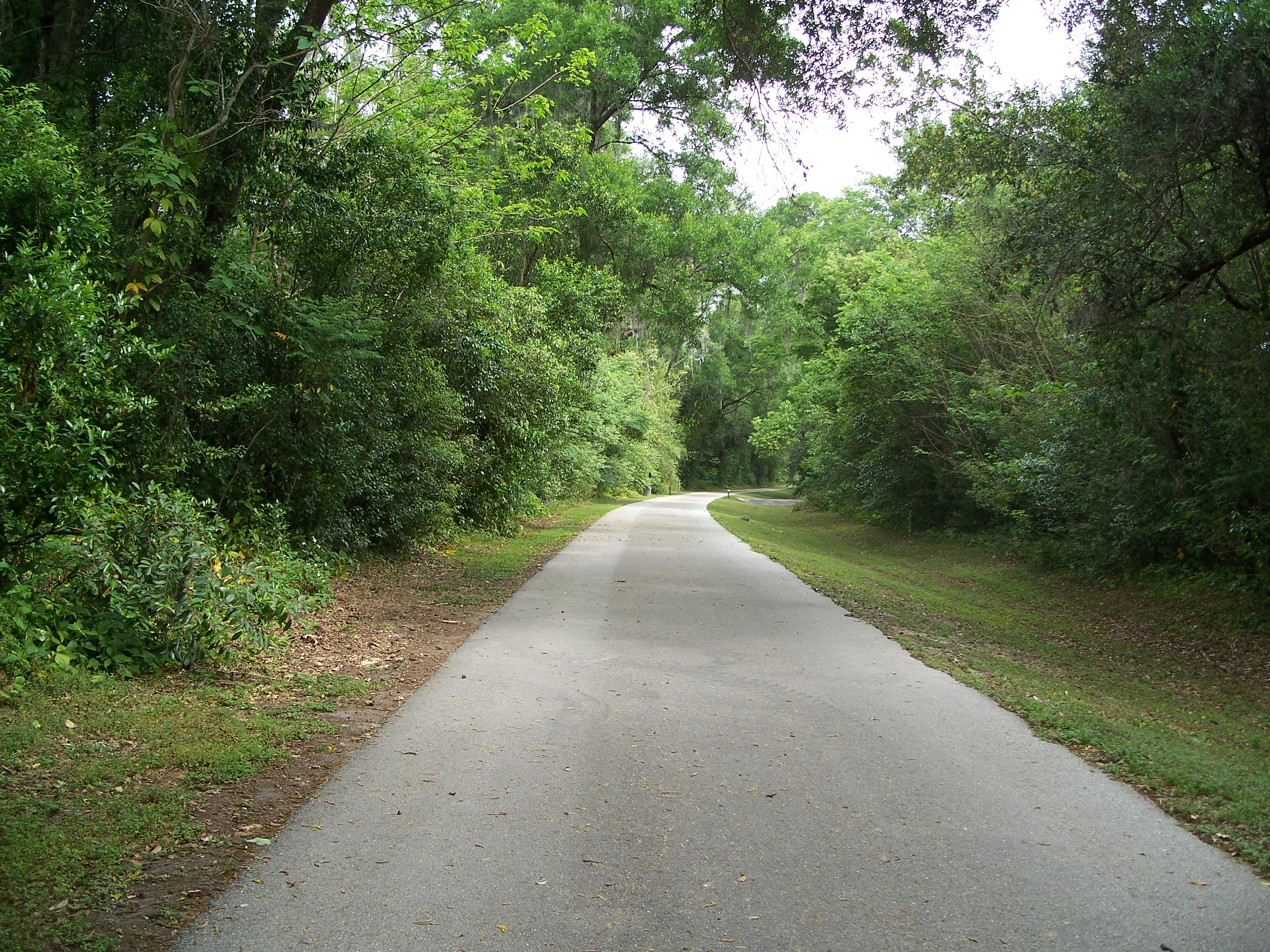
The Hardy Trail in Dade City, Florida as seen looking north from a little south of the mid point, the half mile markers which can be seen in the distance

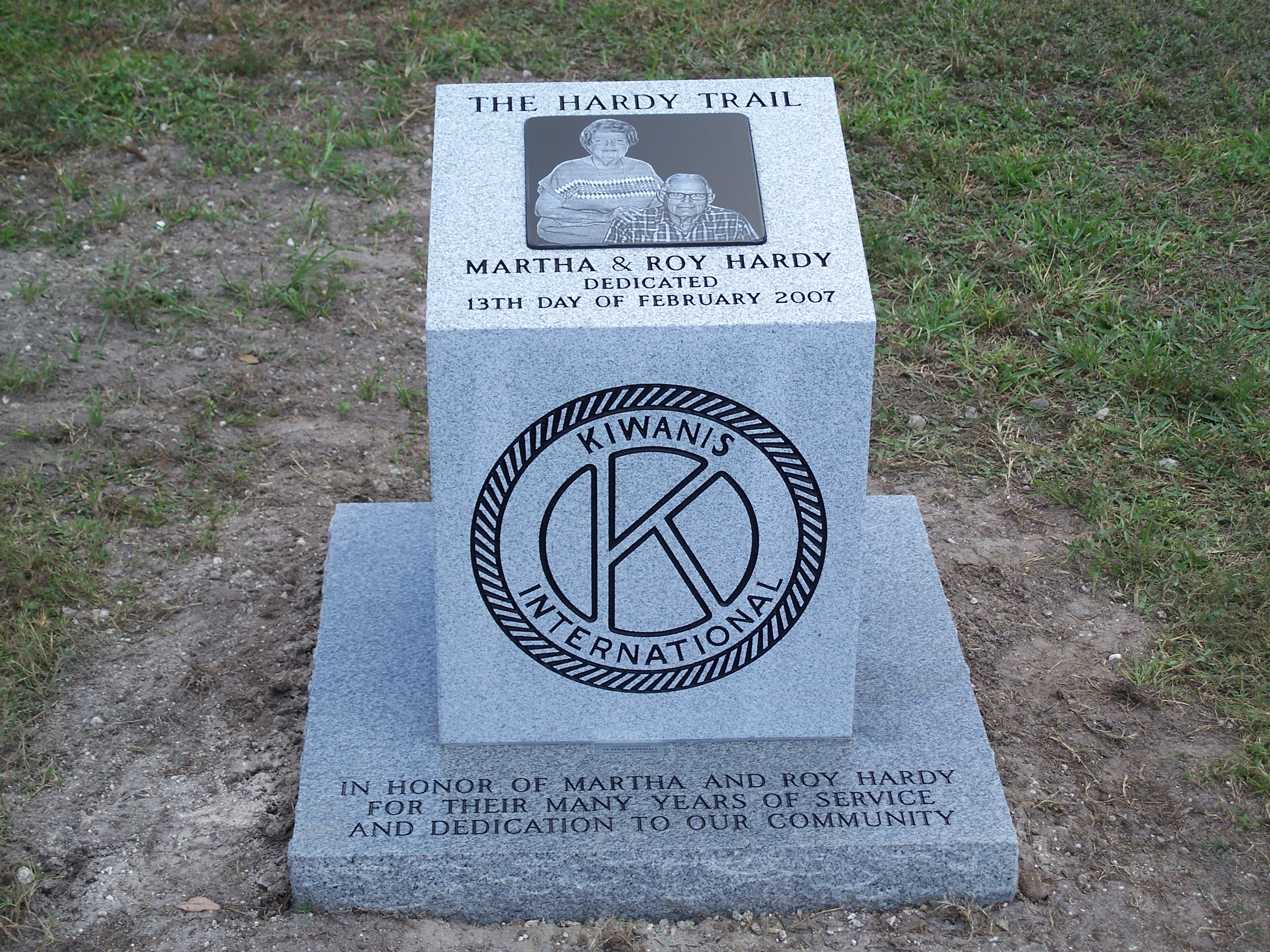
The marker placed near Church Avenue at the dedication of the Hardy Trail in Dade City, Florida

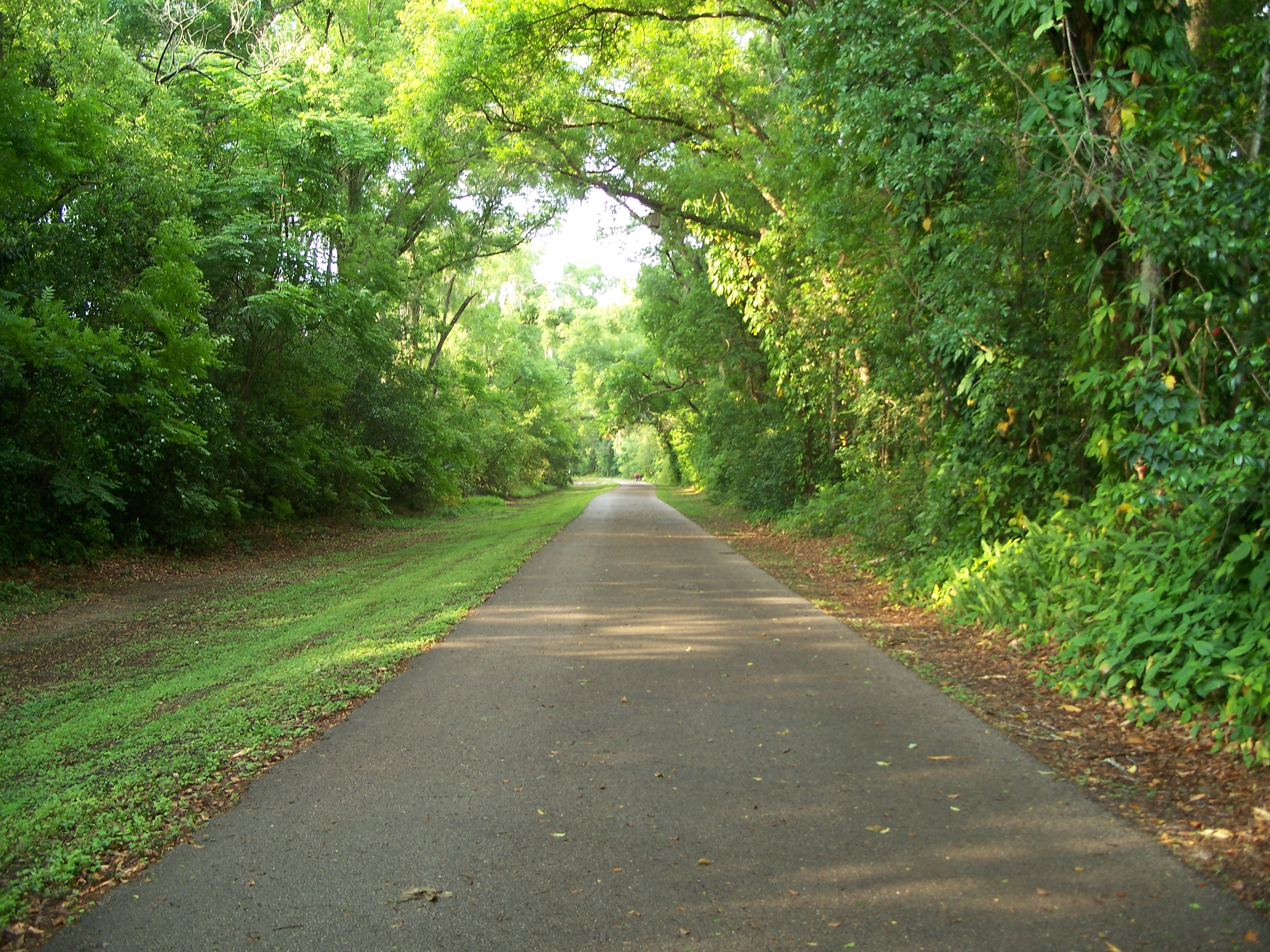
The Hardy Trail in Dade City, Florida as seen looking south from near Florida Avenue toward the mid point, the half mile markers which can be seen in the distance

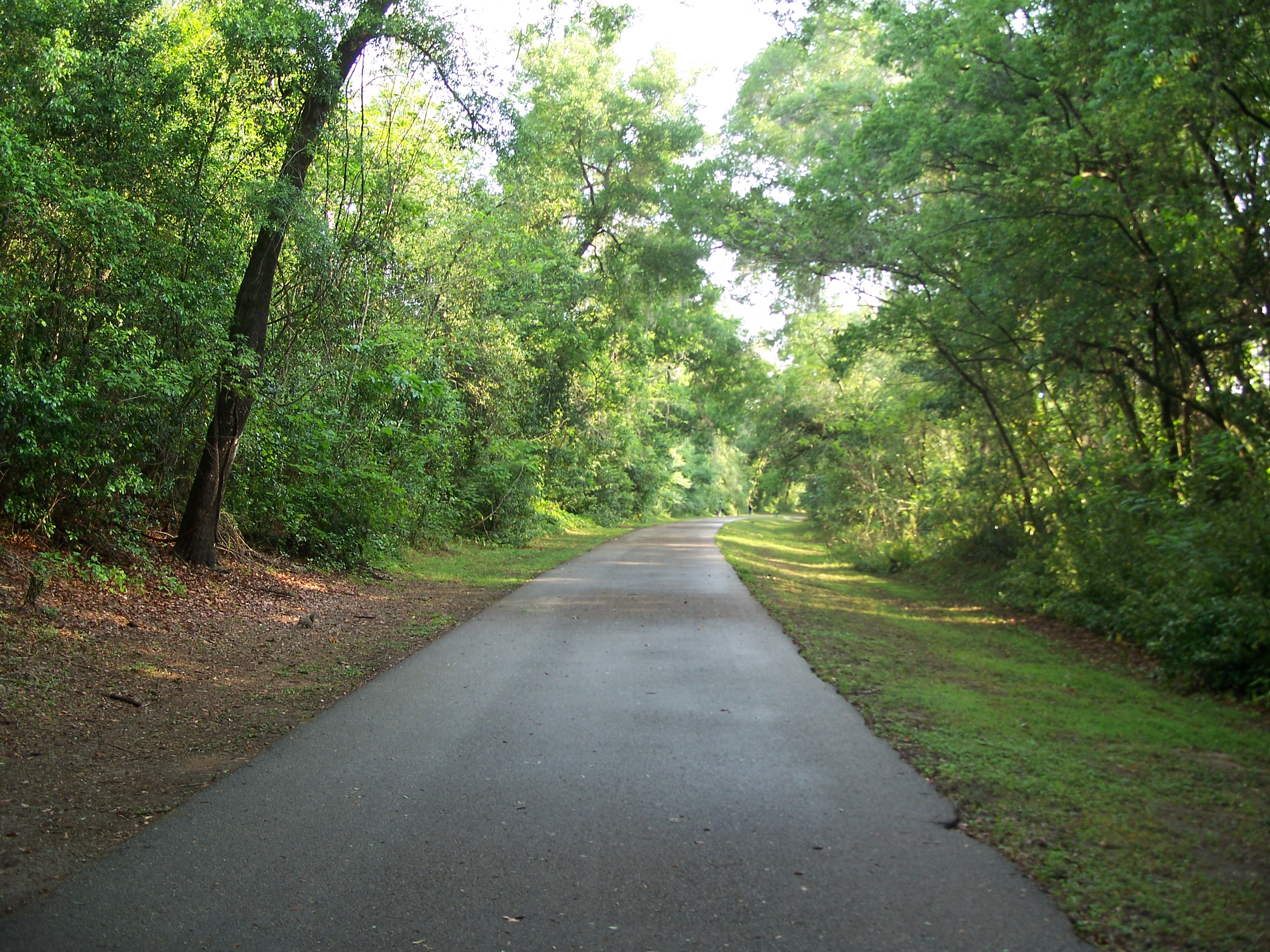
The Hardy Trail in Dade City, Florida as seen looking north from a little south of the mid point, the half mile markers which can be seen in the distance

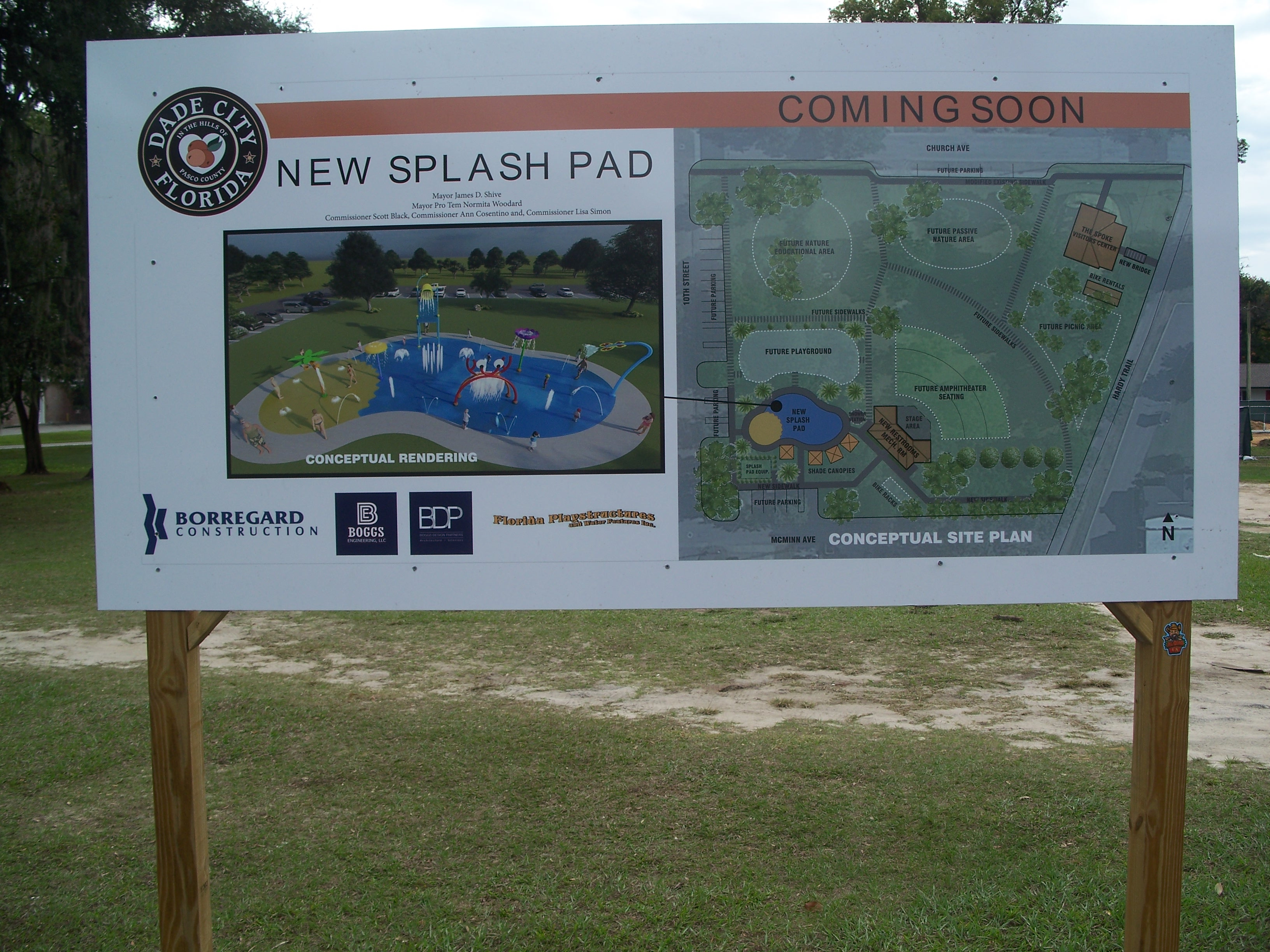
Plans for a future water park along the trail

The Hardy Trail is a paved multi-use recreational trail in Dade City, Florida. It is one mile (1.6 km) long and 12 feet (3.7 m) wide. It follows the path of a segment of the Seaboard Air Line Railroad line where it ran through Dade City. This line was originally built between Zephyrhills and Lacoochee by the Florida Central and Peninsular Railroad, but was abandoned in the 1970's after SAL merged with the Atlantic Coast Line Railroad to form the Seaboard Coast Line Railroad in 1967. It was named after former residents Roy and Martha Hardy, and is used primarily by local residents seeking exercise and recreation. The southern half of the trail is nearly always shaded by the woods through which it runs. The Spoke, a visitor information center constructed where the trail meets Church Street, was to provide visitors with information for all recreational opportunities in Pasco County, with special emphasis on promoting all the trails. Built using a combination of funds generated from various taxes, it operated briefly then closed for an extended period of time. This facility is now occupied by a local history museum as an annex.

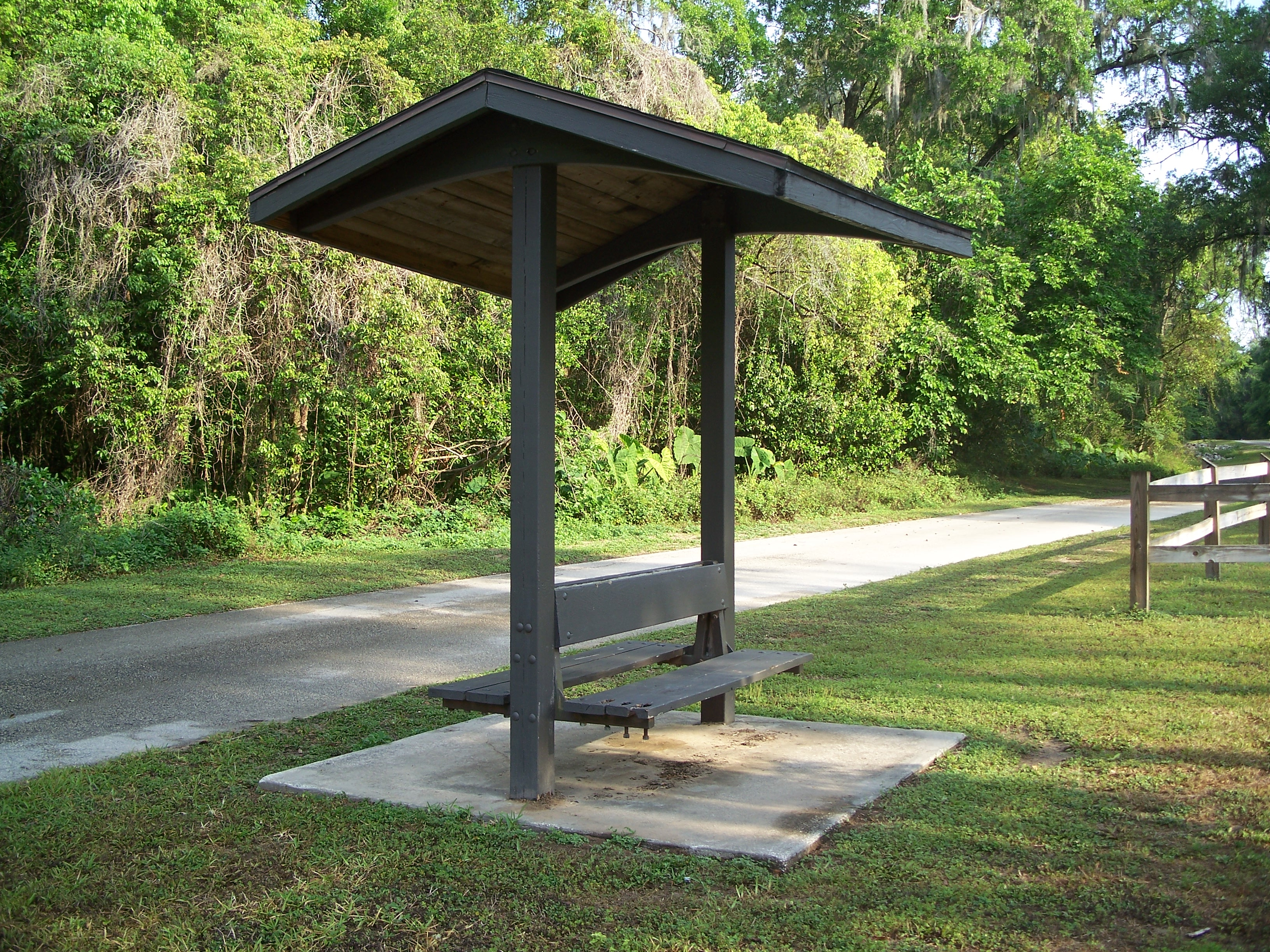
A rest stop with a covered bench on the Hardy Trail in Dade City, Florida

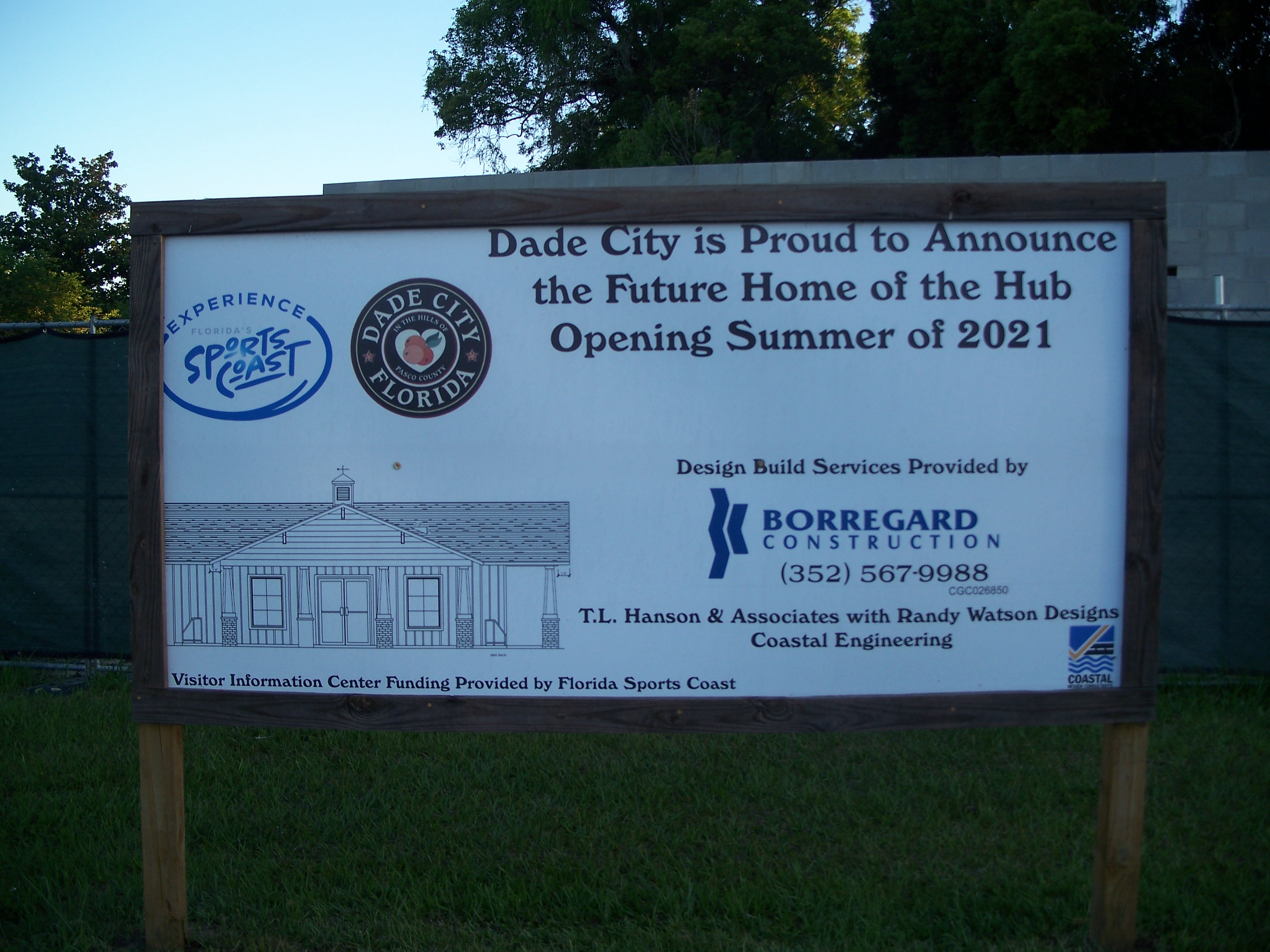
Sign at the site of a planned visitor center where Church Street meets the Hardy Trail in Dade City, Florida.

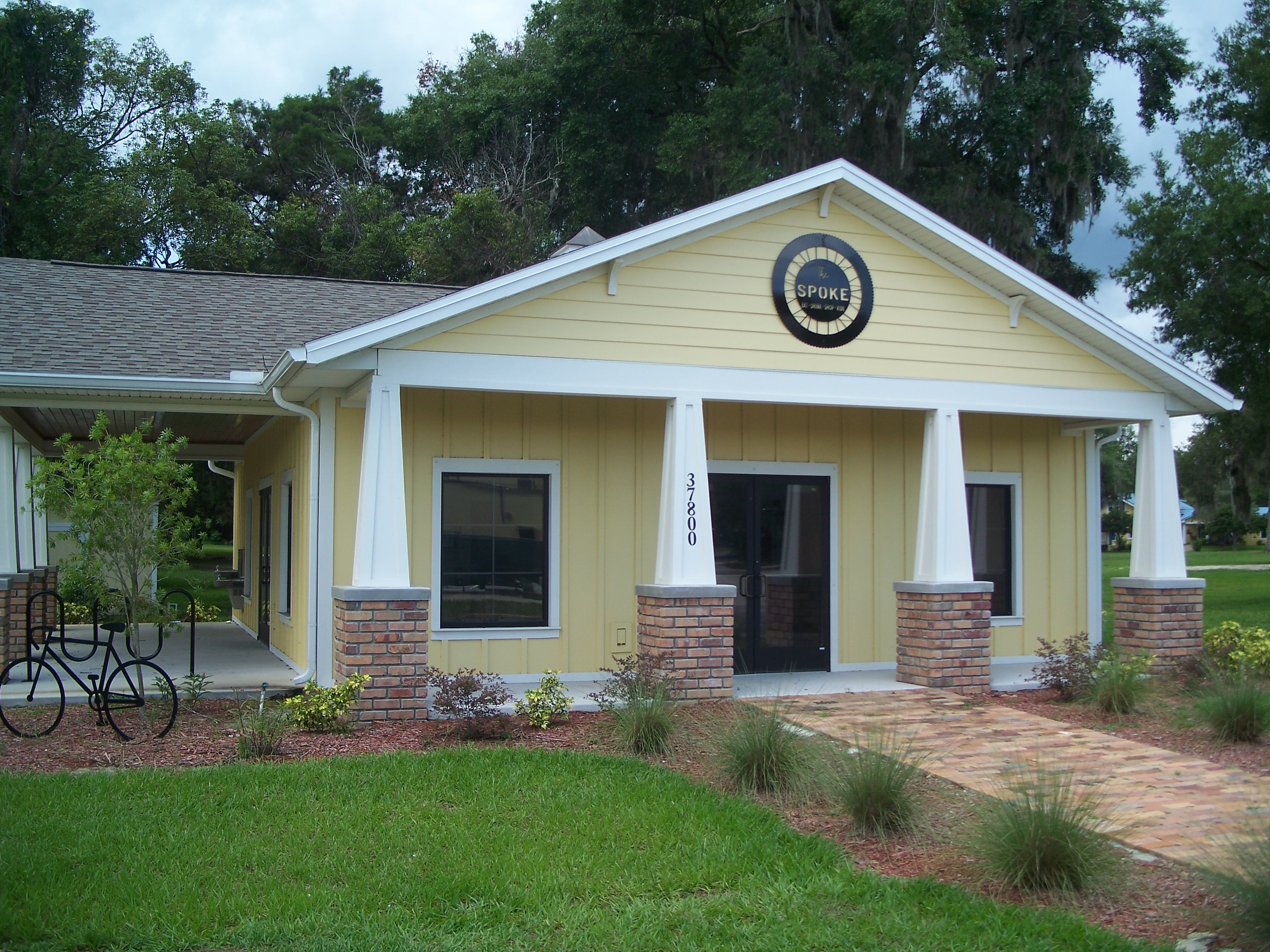
Visitor Information Center on the Hardy Trail by Church Street after its construction was finished.

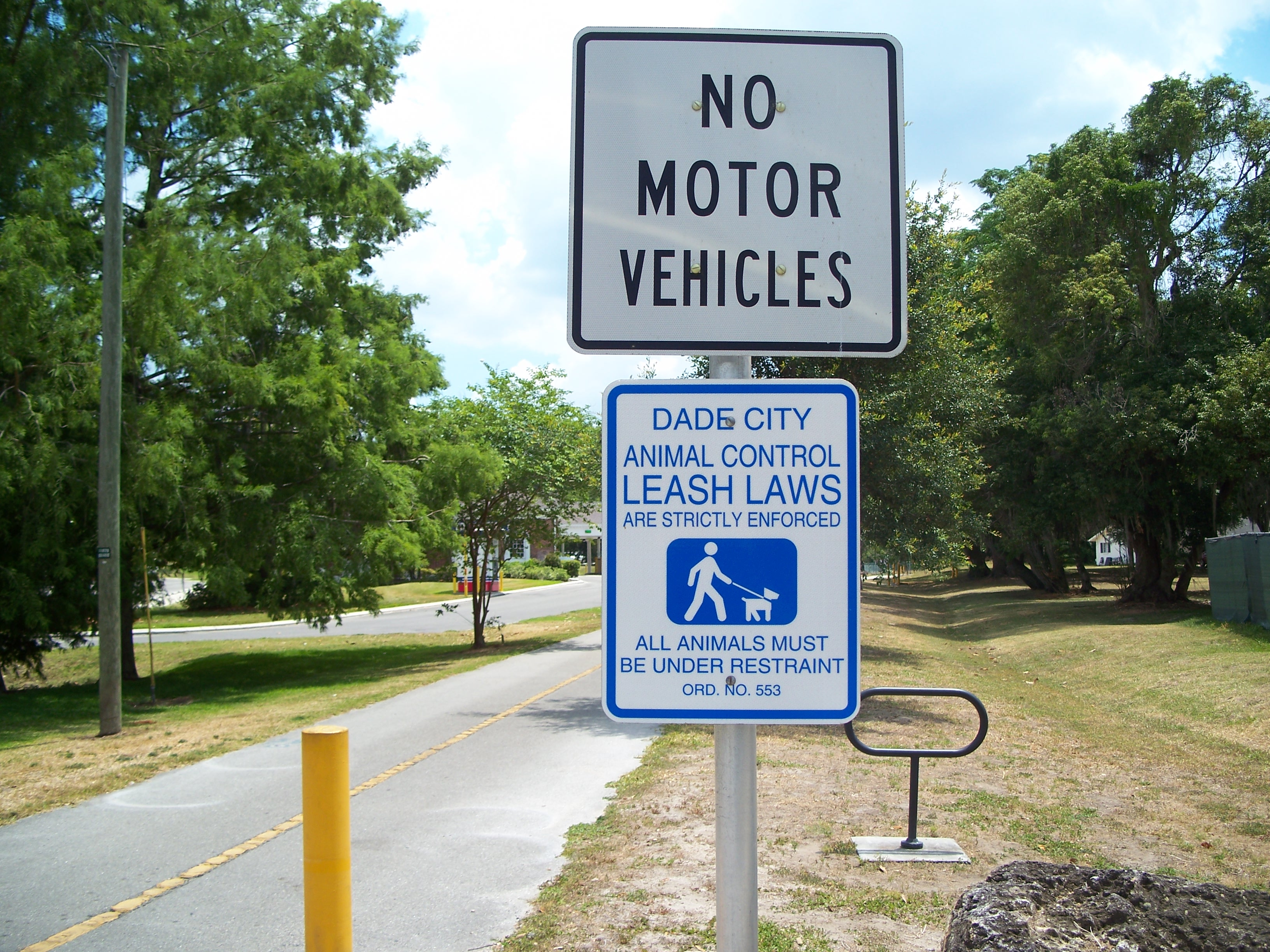
Signage at the start of the Hardy Trail in Dade City, Florida

== See also ==
- Withlacoochee State Trail
- Good Neighbor Trail
