= Croom, Florida =

Ghost town in Florida, U.S.

Coordinates: 28.588°N 82.227°W

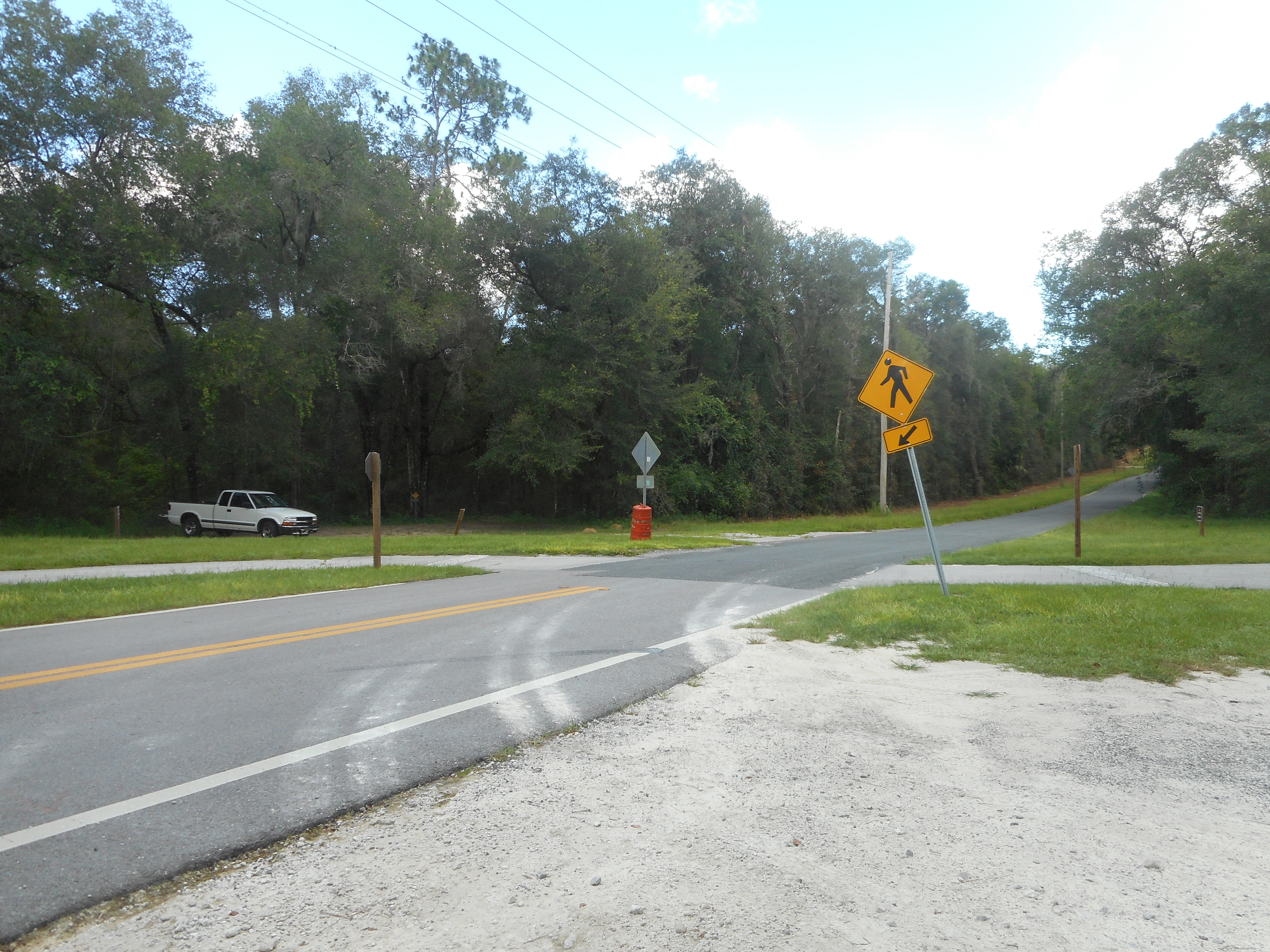
Withlacoochee State Trail at the northern crossing of Croom-Rital Road in Croom, Florida.

Croom, also known by its previous name of Pemberton Ferry, is a ghost town in Central Florida near Brooksville, Florida, and Ridge Manor, Florida. A rail line came to Pemberton Ferry in 1884. It was a rail stop by the Withlacoochee River just north of where the I-75 bridge over Croom-Rital Road and Withlacoochee State Trail is today.

The Croom Tract is part of the Withlacoochee State Forest, and is located just north of another ghost town called Oriole. There is also a 20,000 acre Croom Wildlife Management Area. Ruins in the area include 1900 Thomas House, old foundations, a brick vat, the remains of an iron railroad bridge, family cemeteries and pits from phosphate mining. The area once included a turpentine still, sawmill, sugar mill, railroad switch out, railroad bridge and ferry. The area is now popular for turkey hunting and single track mountain biking. Another settlement in the area south of the community was known as Oriole and an abandoned Oriole cemetery remains in existence.

== History ==
In 1886 a project to clear the Withlacoochee River for navigation went as far as Pemberton Ferry.

A post office was located in the area from 1902 until 1935.

Croom was on the west coast route of the Atlantic Coast Line Railroad to Tampa. A station and a branch line extended to Brooksville. The iron bridge was a trestle for logging trains.

The South Florida Railroad finished the construction of the 57-mile Pemberton’s Ferry Branch in May 1886. It ran from Bartow to Lakeland, where it crossed the South Florida mainline, north to Pemberton’s Ferry, where it interchanged with the Florida Southern Railway.

== See also ==
- List of ghost towns in Florida
