= Pineola, Florida =

Human settlement in Florida, US

Coordinates: 28°41′20″N 82°16′22″W

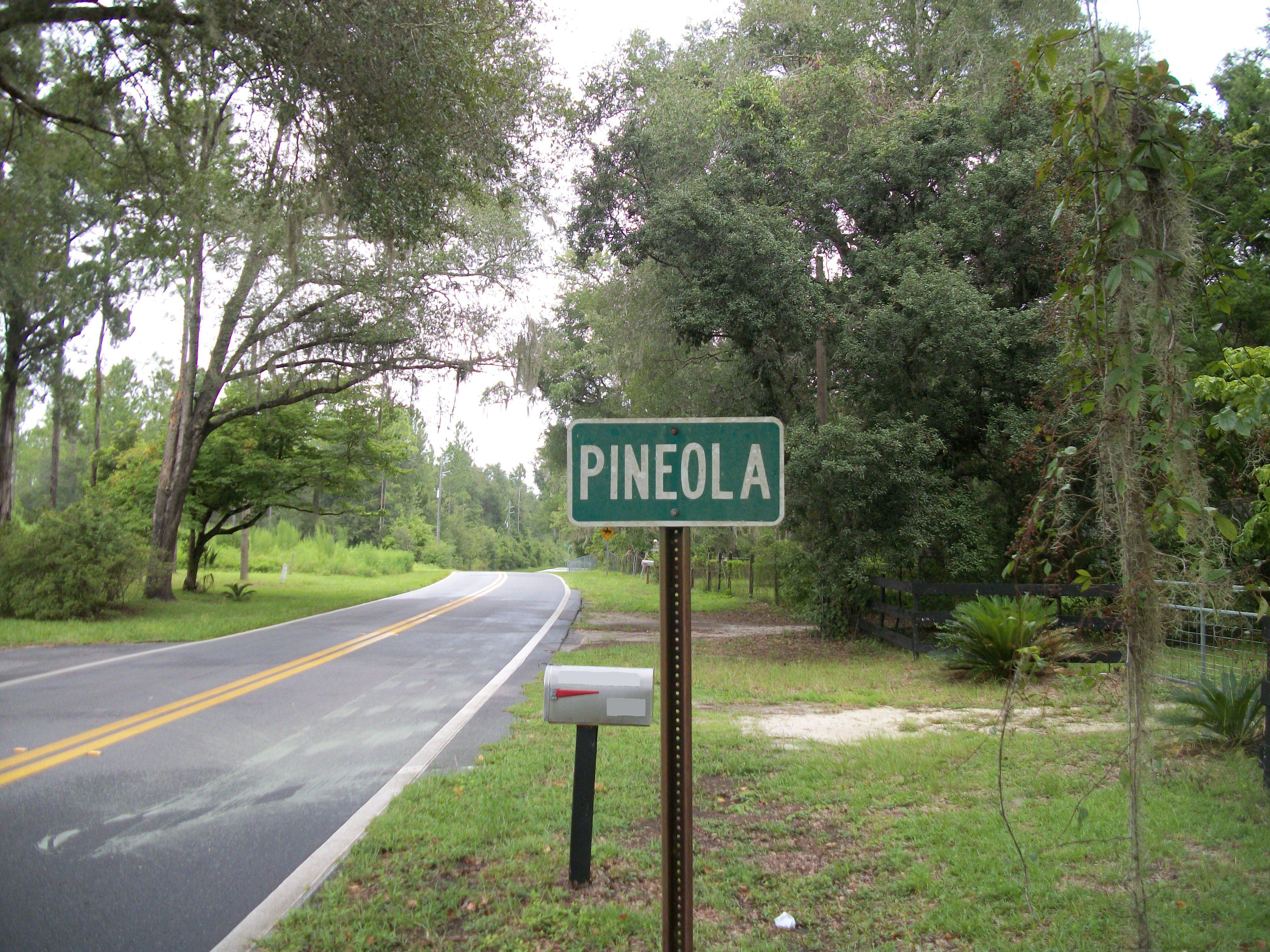
Northbound County Road 39 as it enters Pineola, Florida

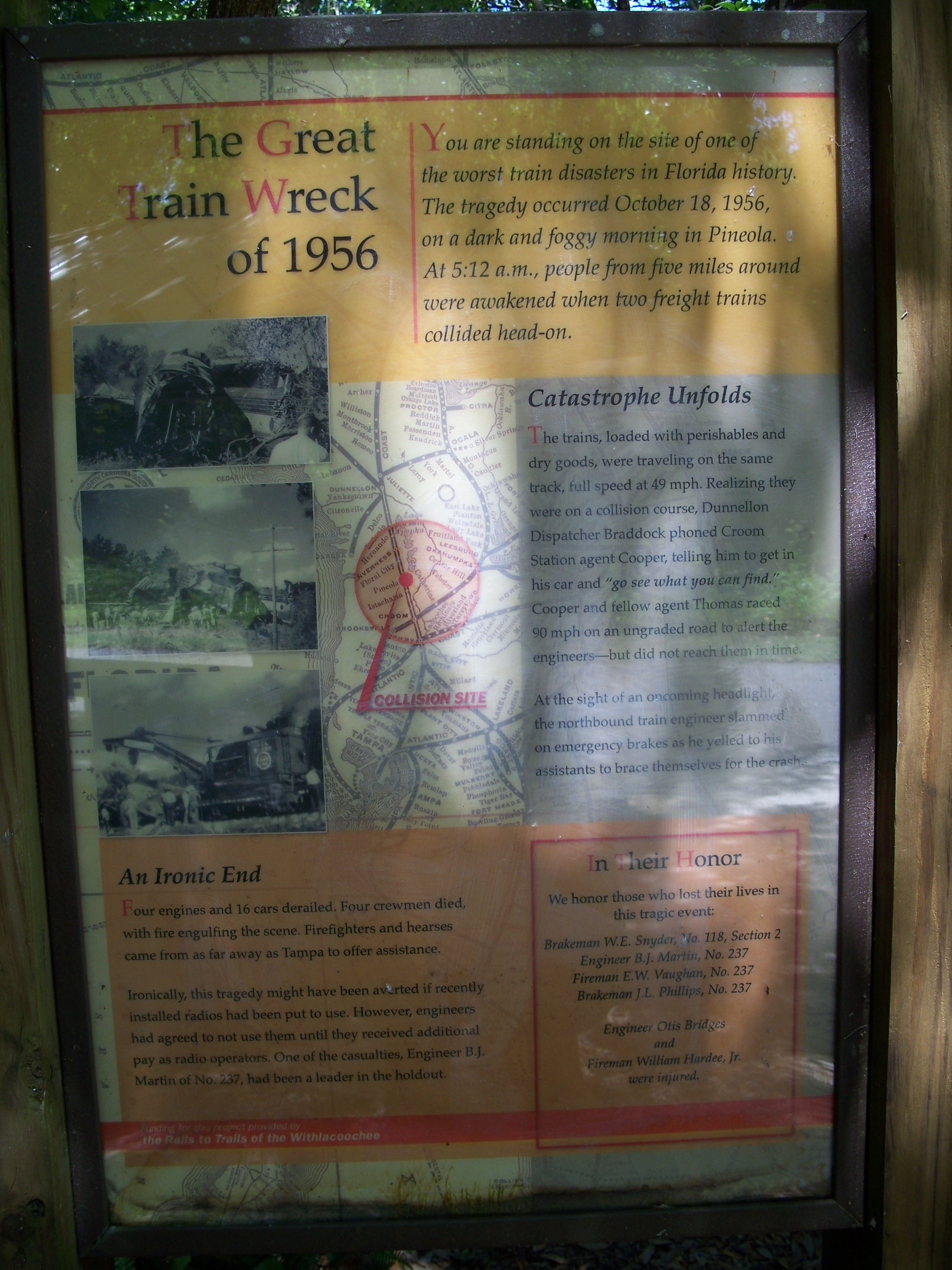
Withlacoochee State Trail signpost commemorating the Great Train Wreck of 1956 in Pineola

Pineola is an unincorporated community in Southeastern Citrus County, Florida. It is located in the southeastern part of the county, to the south of Floral City. It is along County Road 39 (South Istachatta Road) between the Hernando County-Citrus County Line north of Istachatta and County Road 48(East Bushnell Road). The ZIP Code for this community is 33536.

== Pineola Grotto and lime mining ==
The Pineola Grotto (limestone caverns formed by sinkholes) as well as limestone bluffs were associated with the area. They provided specialized fern and other plant habitats and were once studied and documented by prominent botanists. Much has been lost to mining and other encroachments. A. H. Curtiss visited the grotto in 1881 and was followed by others. Several previously undiscovered species were identified at the chasm.

The community itself may have developed around the limestone industry in the early 1900s in conjunction with Pineola Lime Company.

== Great Train Wreck of 1956 ==
Pineola was the site of what has been referred to as "The Great Train Wreck of 1956." On October 18, 1956, a head-on collision between two Atlantic Coast Line Railroad freight trains occurred killing four crewmen. A signpost at the site of the crash on the Withlacoochee State Trail memorializes the event.
