= Good Neighbor Trail =

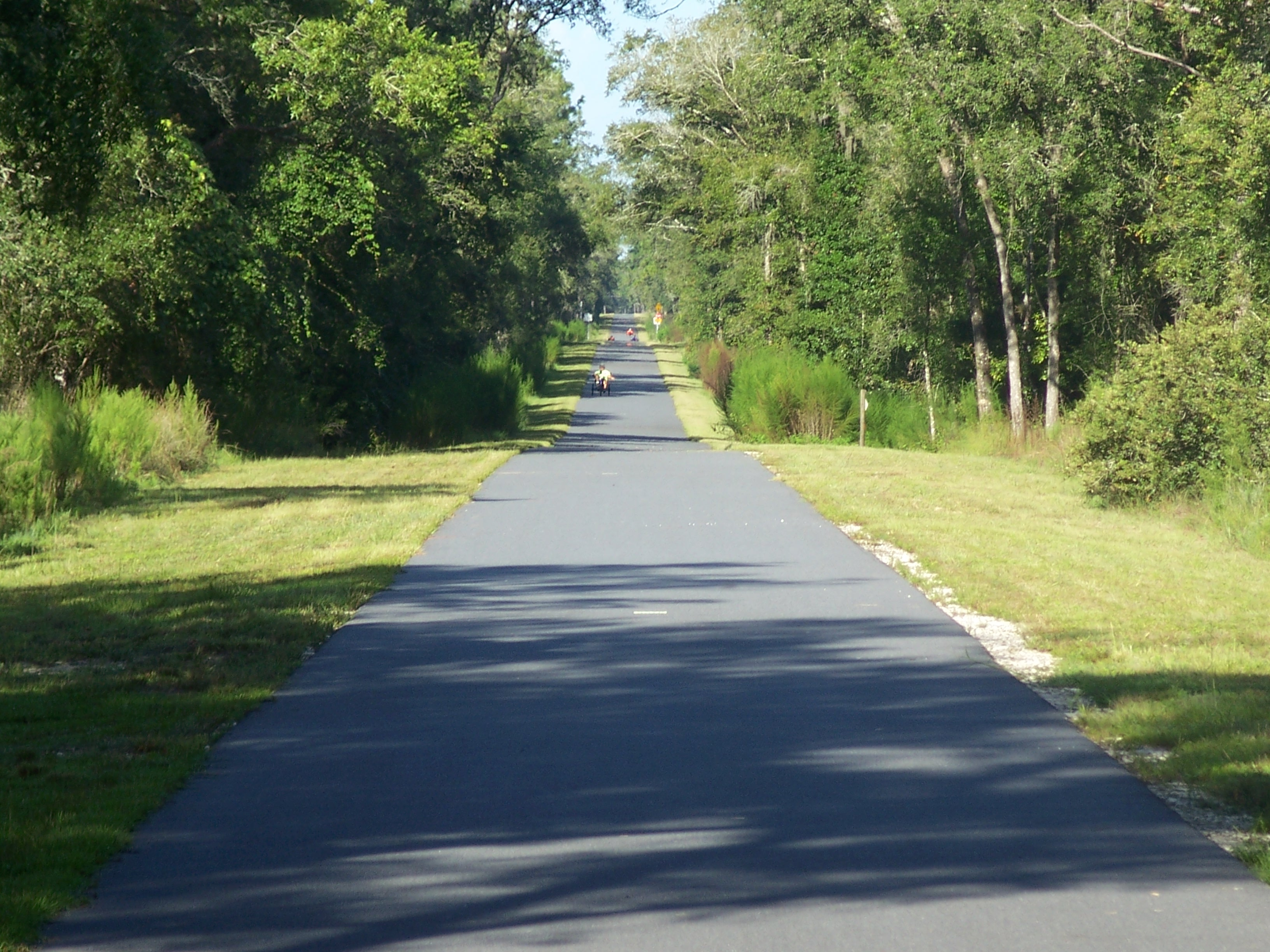
- The Good Neighbor Trail from where it joins the Withlacoochee State Trail
- Length: 10.7 miles
- Location: Hernando County, Florida
- Trailheads: West: 28.5330°N 82.4816°W; East: 28.5899°N 82.2283°W
- Season: Year round
- Surface: Asphalt

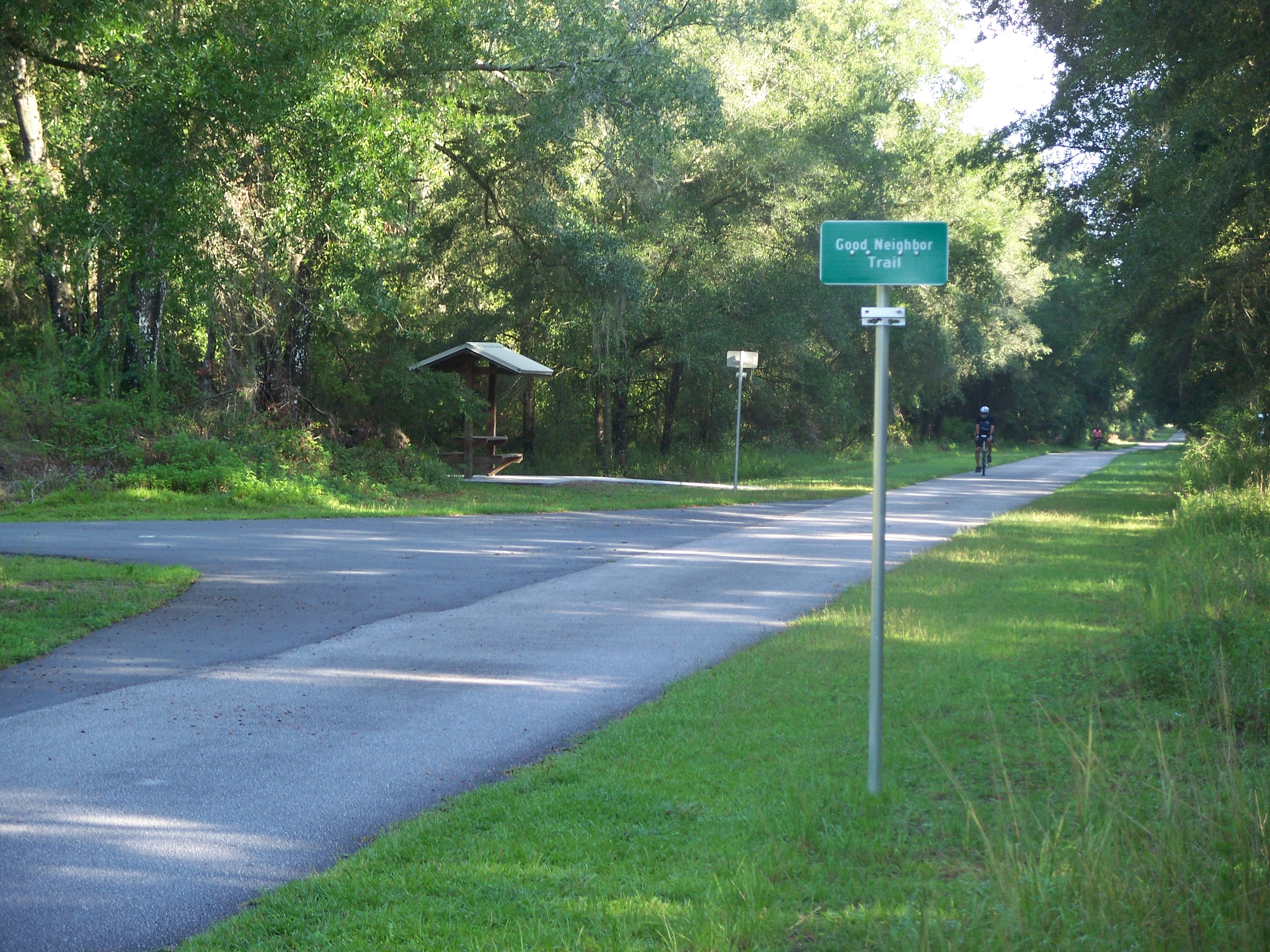
The intersection of the Good Neighbor Trail and the Withlacoochee State Trail

The Good Neighbor Trail is a multi-use recreational trail in Brooksville, Florida, that connects with the Withlacoochee State Trail. The trail is about 10.7 miles (17.2 km) long. The trail was originally the Brooksville Branch of the Florida Southern Railway which later became an Atlantic Coast Line Railroad line from Brooksville to Croom.

== See also ==
- Brooksville Railroad Depot
- Florida Coast-to-Coast Trail
- Withlacoochee State Trail
- Hardy Trail
