= Withlacoochee State Trail =

Longest multi-purpose trail in Florida (U.S.)

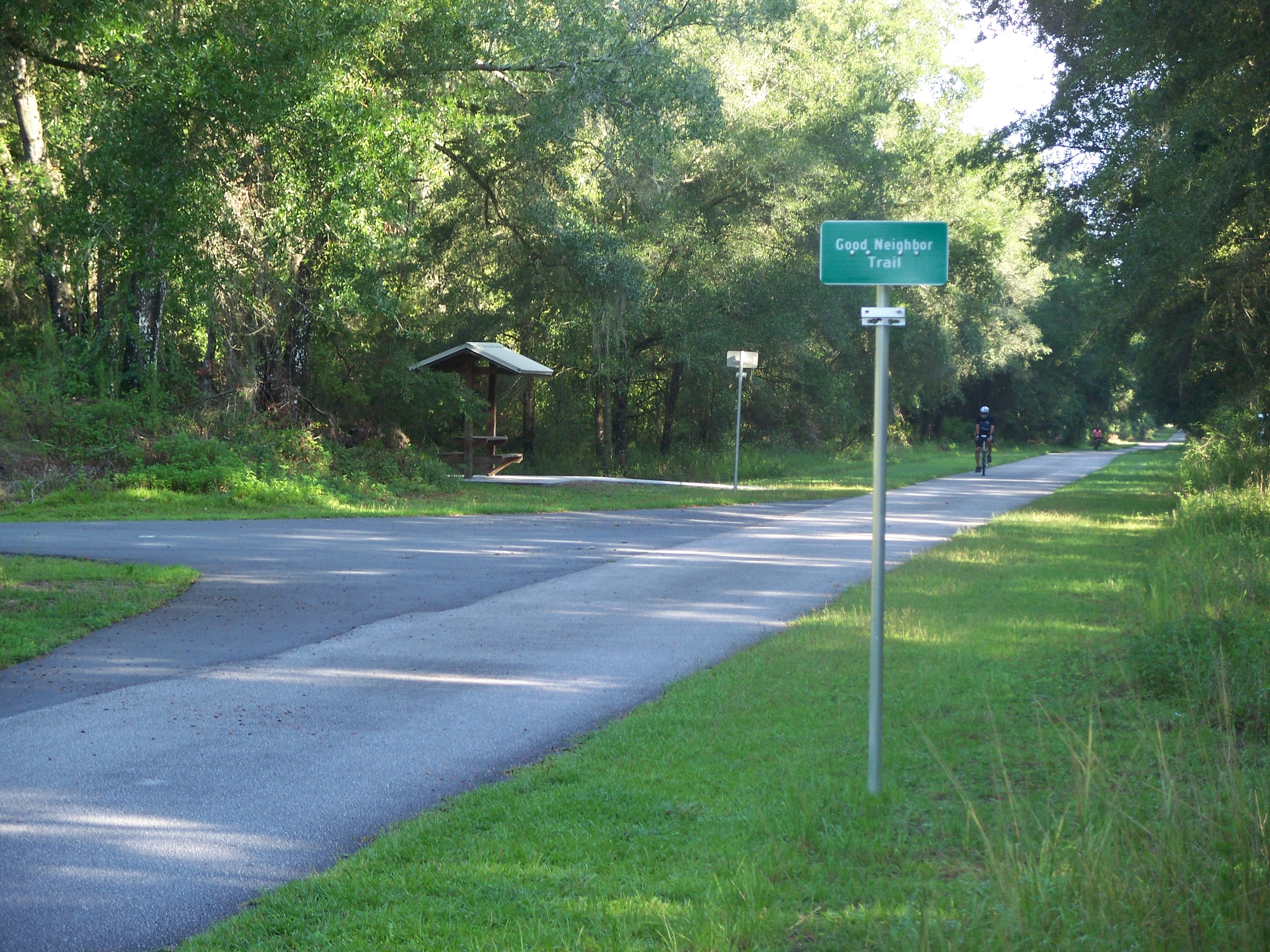
- A view of the trail

- Location within Florida Location within the United States
- Interactive map of Withlacoochee State Trail
- Location: Citrus, Hernando and Pasco counties, USA
- Nearest city: Dunnellon / Trilby
- Coordinates: 28°43′55″N 82°17′52″W
- Governing body: Florida Department of Environmental Protection
- Length: 46 mi (74 km)
- Trailheads: Gulf Junction; South Citrus Springs; Holder; Hernando; Inverness; Floral City; Istachatta; Ridge Manor; Trilby; Owensboro Junction
- Use: Hiking, Biking, Horses
- Hazards: Steep embankments, swampland
- Surface: Asphalt

Withlacoochee State Trail is a 46-mile (74 km) long paved, multi-use, non-motorized rail trail in Florida located in Citrus, Hernando and Pasco counties. It follows along the Withlacoochee River and passes through the Withlacoochee State Forest. It is the longest paved rail trail in Florida.

== History ==
The original railroad line was formed sometime in the 1880s. It connected with what is now the Florida Northern Railroad in Citrus Springs with what is now CSX's Wildwood Subdivision (S Line) in Owensboro (a train junction, south of Trilby).

In 1892, the Silver Springs, Ocala and Gulf Railroad (SSO&G) built the original railroad line through Inverness and Hernando and the South Florida Railroad built from Inverness south. In 1902, the Atlantic Coast Line Railroad (ACL) acquired both the SFR and the SSO&G. The segment was officially declared as the DuPont—Lakeland Line, part of a passenger rail route that afforded a more direct path from Georgia to Gulf Coast tourist destinations. From the 1920s up to 1957, the ACL carried the daily Southland over this line. South of Trilby the route split and there were two different western Florida destinations: train 33 (train 32 northbound) via Atlantic Coast Line tracks to Tarpon Springs, Dunedin, Clearwater, St. Petersburg; and train 37 (train 38 northbound) splitting off the route at Trilby to Zephyrhills, to Tampa and then to Bradenton and Sarasota. Additionally, an unnamed train ran from Jacksonville over this route, also to St. Petersburg. In 1946, an overpass was built to carry a realigned US 301 at Owensboro over both the Seaboard Air Line Railroad and Atlantic Coast Line Railroad tracks.

In 1967, the Atlantic Coast Line and Seaboard Air Line Railroads merged to form the Seaboard Coast Line Railroad. SCL merged with the Louisville and Nashville Railroad and other railroads to form the Seaboard System Railroad in 1982, and in 1986 was merged with the Chessie System to form CSX Railroad. CSX decided to abandon the 47-mile railroad in 1987. In 1989 the state bought the railroad for their "rail-to-trails" program.

== Route description ==
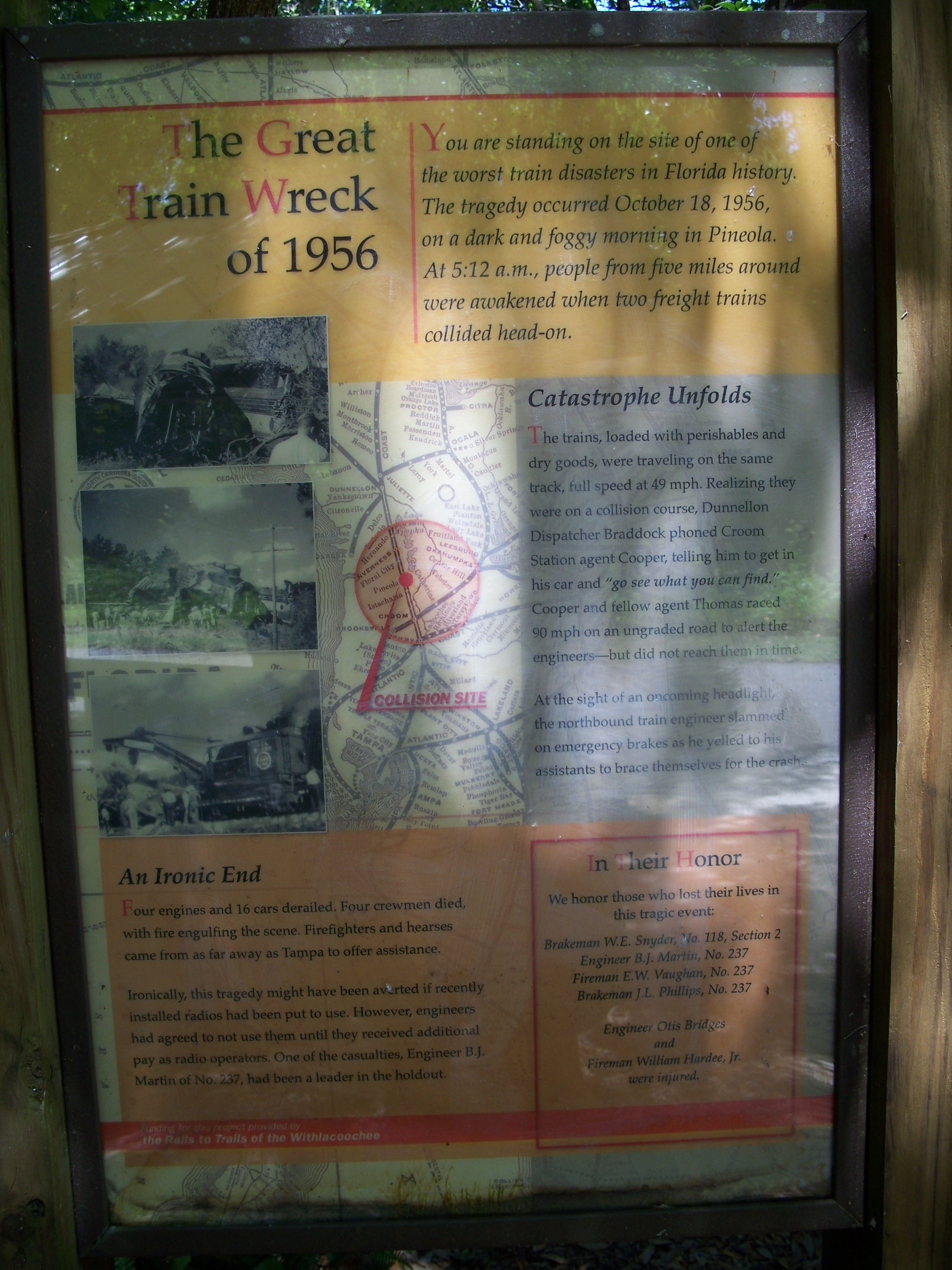
Withlacoochee State Trail signpost commemorating the Great Train Wreck of 1956 in Pineola

The southern terminus is at U.S. 98/301 south of Trilby. The trail goes 6 miles (9.7 km) north to a crossover of U.S. 98/SR 50, a mile east of I-75 and 40 miles (64 km) north past the Silver Lake Campground in the Withlacoochee State Forest, close to the Withlacoochee River. The trail runs under I-75 as it continues north and about a mile from there intersects the Good Neighbor Trail at 28°35'22.2"N 82°13'42.3"W. From there it runs through Nobleton, Istachatta, and then crosses the Hernando-Citrus County Line into Pineola, the site of the Great Train Wreck of 1956.

As it enters Floral City, it runs much closer to and parallel to US 41. South of Inverness across from Citrus County Speedway and the Inverness Airport, there is a paid access trail leading to Fort Cooper State Park. Within Inverness itself, the trail runs under State Road 44, with access trails on both sides running east. North of there, the trail runs through Cooter Pond Park, Wallace Brooks Park and Liberty Park, then uses a former railroad bridge over a section of Lake Henderson. Beneath the bridge under US 41, another trail leads to Whispering Pines Park, and from there it makes a right curve around White Lake. Just south of the intersection with East Arlington Street, it runs relatively close to the west side of US 41. In Hernando, the trail is briefly detoured around County Road 486 for one block, then resumes its use of the former railroad right-of-way. Before reaching Holder, it has an intersection with another trail leading to the Central Ridge District Park. North of there it continues through Citrus CR 491 in Holder, and Citrus Springs, where it finally ends at Gulf Junction just south of Dunnellon.

Since the widening of County Road 486, a multi-use path along that route follows it west passing through County Road 491, and connected to State Road 44 by the end of 2013. In May 2013, the State of Florida had approved funding for the Coast to Coast Connector, some of which will include connecting the Withlacoochee State Trail to the Claridoma-Ocoee Connector Trail in Lake County, which will then connect all the way to the east coast, terminating on Merritt Island. The Coast to Coast Connector will also connect the Withlacoochee State Trail to the Suncoast Trail, which follows the Suncoast Parkway south to Tampa.

== Parking ==
Parking for the trail is located off U.S. 98/301 at the Owensboro Junction Trailhead, C.R. 575 / Trilby Trailhead, S.R. 50 Trailhead on Croom-Rital Road, Silver Lake Campground, Townsen Lake Regional Park off C.R. 476, Desoto Trail Kiosk off U.S. 41, Wallace Brooks Park and Liberty Park in Inverness, South Citrus Springs Trailhead and Gulf Junction Trailhead, both of which are in Citrus Springs.

== Hazards ==
- Steep embankments, most notably north of Inverness and between Istachatta and Floral City.
- Swampland between Istachatta and Pineola.

== Grade separations ==
- US 98-SR 50 in Ridge Manor (pedestrian bridge built over the road.)
- I-75 (SR 93) near Croom (surviving bridge built over former ACL tracks.)
- SR 44 (underpasses rebuilt in 2003.)
- Lake Henderson (old railroad bridge)
- US 41 (SR 45) in Inverness (surviving bridge built over former ACL tracks.)

== See also ==
- Suncoast trail
- Good Neighbor Trail
- Hardy Trail
