= Inverness Airport (Florida) =

Airport in Florida, U.S.

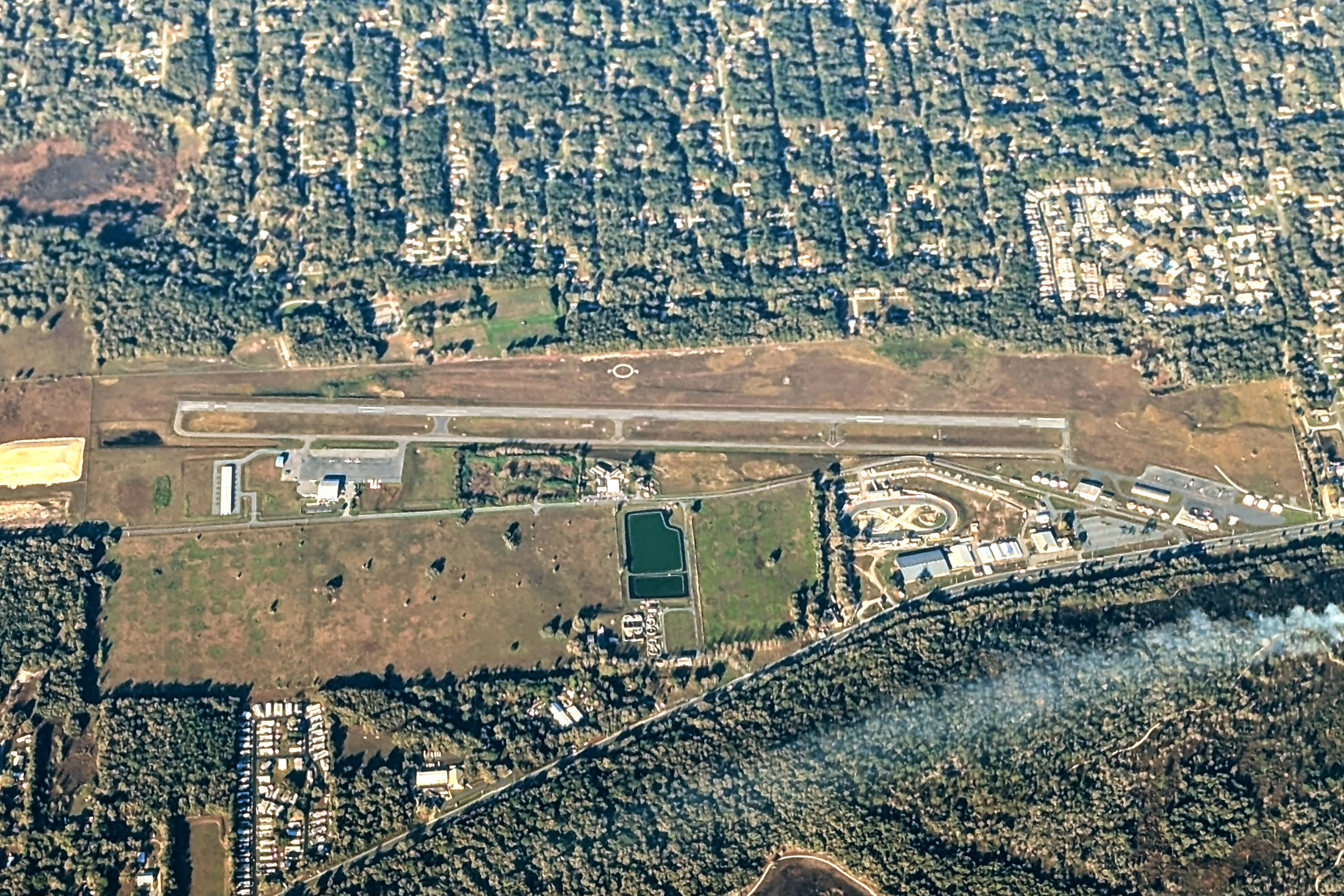
- IATA: none; ICAO: KINF; FAA LID: INF

Summary
- Airport type: Public
- Owner: Citrus County
- Serves: Inverness, Florida
- Elevation AMSL: 65 ft (20 m)
- Coordinates: 28°48′13″N 082°19′06″W
- Website: bocc.citrus.fl.us/...

Map
- Location of airport in Florida INF (the United States)

Runways
Direction	Length		Surface
Direction	ft	m	Surface
1/19	5,000	1,524	Asphalt

Statistics (2018)
- Aircraft operations (year ending 9/19/2018): 73,000
- Based aircraft: 23
- Source: Federal Aviation Administration

Inverness Airport (ICAO: KINF, FAA LID: INF, formerly X40) is a public use airport located two nautical miles (4 km) southeast of the central business district of Inverness, a city in Citrus County, Florida, United States. The airport is owned by Citrus County and contains an aviation unit of the Citrus County Sheriff's Office. It is also located next to the Citrus County Speedway.

Although most U.S. airports use the same three-letter location identifier for the FAA and IATA, this airport is assigned INF by the FAA but has no designation from the IATA (which assigned INF to In Guezzam Airport in Algeria).

== History ==
The airport was originally established with a grass runway in the 1920s. The Goodyear Blimp used the airport in late 1929 while flying from Valdosta, Georgia to Key West.

The airport was recognized by the Federal Government in 1930.

Since 2023, a business park adjacent to the airport has been under construction with room for additional hangars and taxiways as well as businesses accessible by road. As of October 2025, bidding for business development is open. Permits cleared in January 2026, and Phase 2 construction was under contract at the time with final environmental checks pending before building begins.

As of September 2025, a lawsuit regarding the cancellation of the local Fixed-Base Operator's lease contract is pending litigation.

A new hangar is under development at the airport.

== Facilities and aircraft ==
Inverness Airport covers an area of 347 acres (140 ha) at an elevation of 65 feet (20 m) above mean sea level. It has one runway designated 1/19 with an asphalt surface measuring 5,000 by 75 feet (1,524 x 23 m).

The airport has a fixed-base operator that sells fuel. The airport offers services such as hangars and courtesy transportation. Amenities such as internet, conference rooms, vending machines, a crew lounge, snooze rooms, and more are available.

For the 12-month period ending September 19, 2018, the airport had 73,000 general aviation aircraft operations, an average of 200 per day. At that time there were 23 aircraft based at this airport: 20 single-engine airplanes, 2 helicopters, and 1 glider.

== Accidents & incidents ==
- On August 14, 2025, a Piper Super Cruiser crashed while performing landing practice at the Inverness Airport.

== See also ==
- List of airports in Florida
