= Turpentine camp =

Labour establishment for production of turpentine

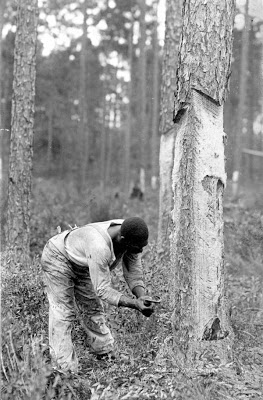
A man harvests turpentine in Alabama

Turpentine camps were industrial labor establishments, often featuring forced labor, common in the South, dedicated to the production of turpentine as part of the naval stores industry.
