= Citrus County, Florida =

County in Florida, United States

- County
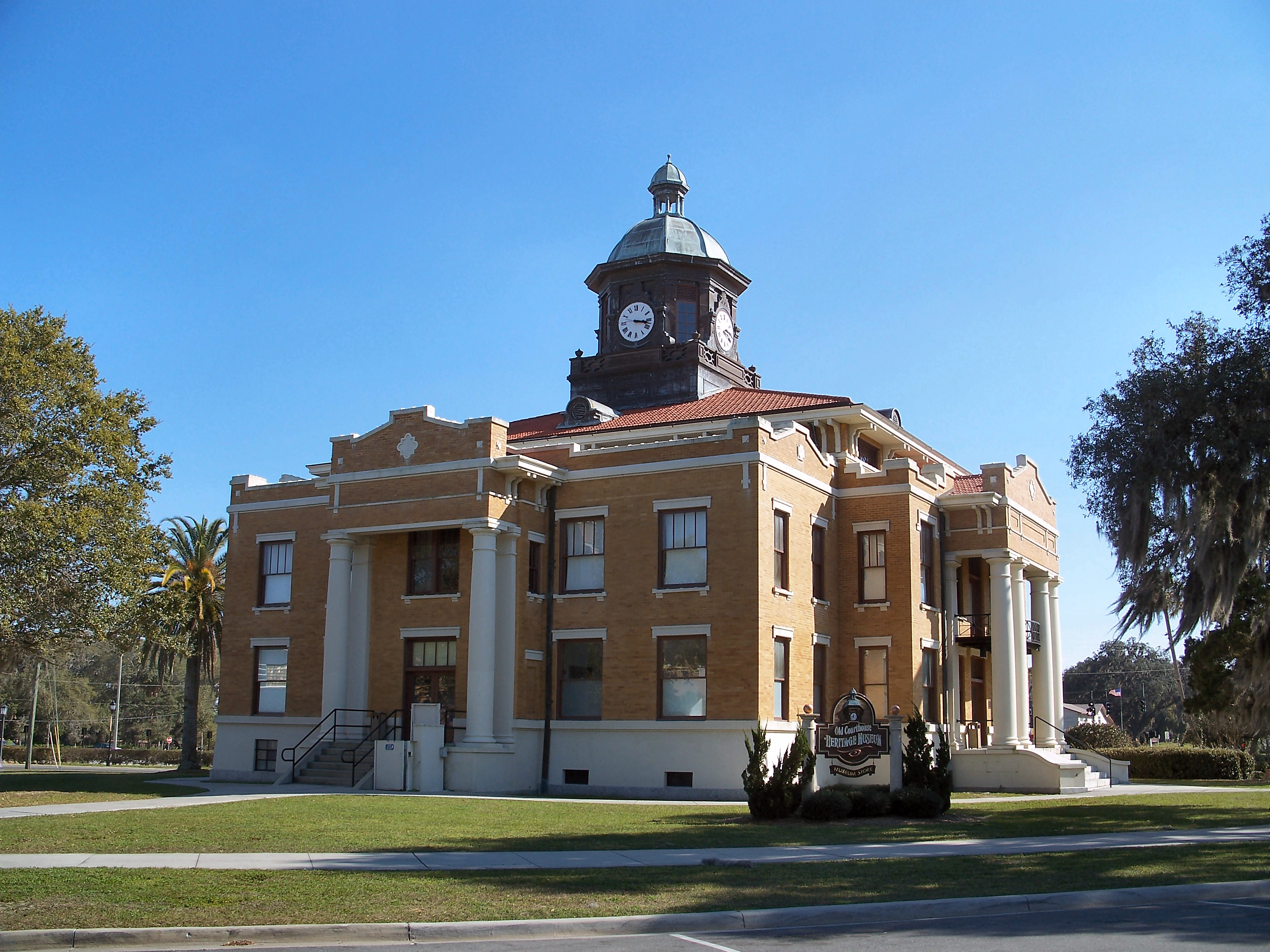
- Old Citrus County Courthouse

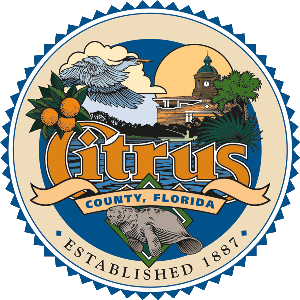
- Seal

- Location within the U.S. state of Florida
- Coordinates: 28.85°N 82.52°W
- Country: United States
- State: Florida
- Founded: June 2, 1887
- Named for: Citrus trees (previously a major industry in the county)
- Seat: Inverness
- Largest community: Homosassa Springs

Area
  - Total: 773 sq mi (2,000 km^{2})
  - Land: 582 sq mi (1,510 km^{2})
  - Water: 192 sq mi (500 km^{2}) 24.8%

Population (2020)
  - Total: 153,843
  - Estimate (2025): 171,666 ▲
  - Density: 264/sq mi (102/km^{2})
- Time zone: UTC−5 (Eastern)
  - Summer (DST): UTC−4 (EDT)
- ZIP Codes: 34446, 34442, 34465 and 34461
- Area code: 352
- Congressional district: 12th
- Website: www.citruscounty.gov

Citrus County is a county located on the northwest central coast of the U.S. state of Florida. As of the 2020 census, the population was 153,843. Its county seat is Inverness, and its largest community is Homosassa Springs. Citrus County comprises the Homosassa Springs, Florida Metropolitan Statistical Area.

== History ==
The area covered by present-day Citrus County is thought to have been first occupied at least 10,000 years ago. About 2,500 years ago, mound-building Native Americans settled in the area and built the complex that now forms the Crystal River Archeological Site. The site was occupied for about 2,000 years. Why the complex was abandoned is currently unknown.

Citrus County was created in 1887. The Citrus County area was formerly part of Hernando County. It was named for the county's citrus groves. Citrus production declined dramatically after the "Big Freeze" of 1894-1895: today, citrus is grown on one large grove, Bellamy Grove; additionally, some residents have citrus trees on their personal property.

After the Big Freeze the next major industry was phosphate mining, which continued until World War I. Planned industrial development surrounding the construction of the Cross Florida Barge Canal never came to fruition when the partially-built canal was terminated after environmental opposition. A later attempt to create a port (Port Citrus) from the portion of the canal that was completed resulted in no significant progress and the county voted in 2015 to scuttle the project.

The original Citrus County seat was Mannfield (incorrectly spelled Mansfield or Mannsfeld in some sources). The county seat was later moved to Inverness; only a street and a pond remain of the original county seat town.

The first library in Citrus County was founded in 1917 in Inverness. Other branches opened in Floral City in 1958, and Hernando in 1959, as well as the freestanding Crystal River and Homosassa Libraries. These libraries joined to create the Central Florida Library System in 1961. Beverly Hills Library opened in 1970 and joined the Central Florida Library System. A Special Library Taxing District was created by the voters in March 1984. In October 1987, the Citrus County Library System was established which allowed the county residents to administer their own system.

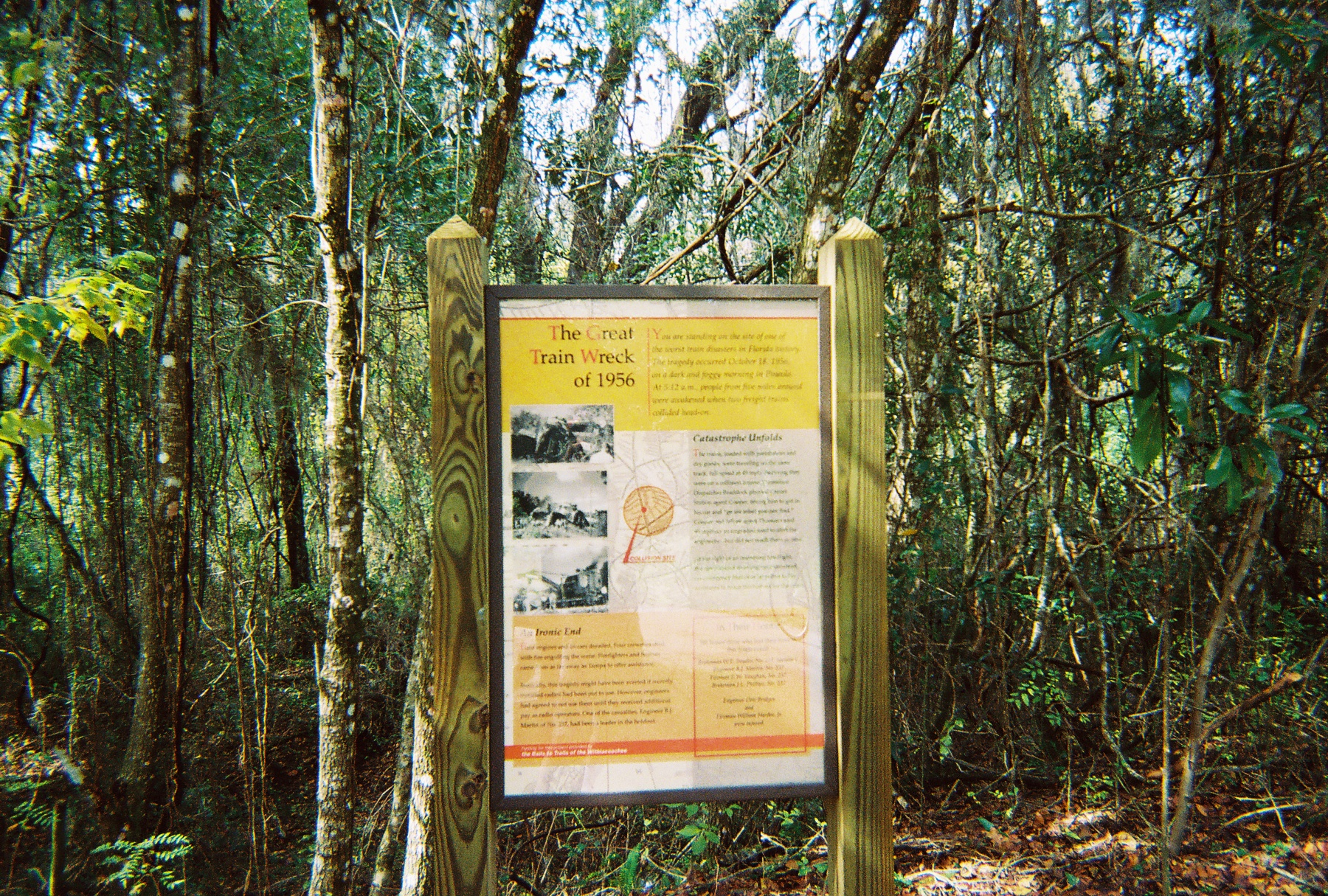
Sign on the Withlacoochee State Trail marking the site of the "Great Train Wreck of 1956" at Pineola, Florida.

Over 100 people and 50 pets were rescued after ten feet of storm surge hit the area during Hurricane Helene in September 2024.

== Geography ==
According to the U.S. Census Bureau, the county has a total area of 773 square miles (2,000 km^{2}), of which 582 square miles (1,510 km^{2}) is land and 192 square miles (500 km^{2}) (24.8%) is water. It is considered to be part of the Nature Coast of Florida.

There are a number of uninhabited and/or sparsely inhabited coastal islands that can be accessed via watercraft. While some of the Citrus County islands are state lands thus available for public use for recreational opportunities, many other Citrus County islands are private property and are either wholly or partially owned by private parties.

=== Adjacent counties ===
- Levy County - northwest
- Marion County - northeast
- Sumter County - east
- Hernando County - south

=== National protected areas ===
- Chassahowitzka National Wildlife Refuge (part)
- Crystal River National Wildlife Refuge

=== Fauna ===
According to the US Fish and Wildlife Service's aerial manatee surveys, as many as 400 of these unique creatures can be found in Citrus County at one time. This typically occurs only during the coldest months of the year.

Manatees can also be viewed in the underwater observatory at Homosassa Springs Wildlife State Park. Most of the park's residents are injured animals either undergoing rehabilitation for future release to the wild, or will be permanent due to their inability to be released to the wild. The notable exception is Lucifer, an African hippopotamus that had prior movie roles. When a permanent home could not be found for Lucifer, then-Governor Lawton Chiles named him an "honorary citizen of the state" thus allowing him to remain at the Park.

== Demographics ==
Historical population
Census	Pop.	Note	%±
1890	2,394		—
1900	5,391		125.2%
1910	6,731		24.9%
1920	5,220		−22.4%
1930	5,516		5.7%
1940	5,846		6.0%
1950	6,111		4.5%
1960	9,268		51.7%
1970	19,196		107.1%
1980	54,703		185.0%
1990	93,515		71.0%
2000	118,085		26.3%
2010	141,236		19.6%
2020	153,843		8.9%
2025 (est.)	171,666	▲	11.6%
U.S. Decennial Census; 1790-1960 1900-1990; 1990-2000 2010-2015

=== 2020 census ===
As of the 2020 census, there were 153,843 people, 69,438 households, and 40,063 families residing in the county. The median age was 57.9 years. 14.5% of residents were under the age of 18 and 37.3% of residents were 65 years of age or older. For every 100 females there were 93.8 males, and for every 100 females age 18 and over there were 92.1 males age 18 and over.

The racial makeup of the county was 87.5% White, 2.7% Black or African American, 0.4% American Indian and Alaska Native, 1.6% Asian, <0.1% Native Hawaiian and Pacific Islander, 1.5% from some other race, and 6.3% from two or more races. Hispanic or Latino residents of any race comprised 6.0% of the population.

75.0% of residents lived in urban areas, while 25.0% lived in rural areas.

There were 69,438 households in the county, of which 17.6% had children under the age of 18 living in them. Of all households, 48.7% were married-couple households, 17.6% were households with a male householder and no spouse or partner present, and 26.2% were households with a female householder and no spouse or partner present. About 30.1% of all households were made up of individuals and 18.8% had someone living alone who was 65 years of age or older.

There were 81,687 housing units, of which 15.0% were vacant. Among occupied housing units, 82.1% were owner-occupied and 17.9% were renter-occupied. The homeowner vacancy rate was 2.6% and the rental vacancy rate was 10.0%.

=== Racial and ethnic composition ===
Citrus County, Florida – Racial and ethnic composition Note: the US Census treats Hispanic/Latino as an ethnic category. This table excludes Latinos from the racial categories and assigns them to a separate category. Hispanics/Latinos may be of any race.
Race / Ethnicity (NH = Non-Hispanic)	Pop 1980	Pop 1990	Pop 2000	Pop 2010	Pop 2020	% 1980	% 1990	% 2000	% 2010	% 2020
White alone (NH)	51,971	88,963	109,828	126,549	131,477	95.01%	95.13%	93.01%	89.60%	85.46%
Black or African American alone (NH)	1,754	2,170	2,712	3,767	3,891	3.21%	2.32%	2.30%	2.67%	2.53%
Native American or Alaska Native alone (NH)	73	274	389	418	466	0.13%	0.29%	0.33%	0.30%	0.30%
Asian alone (NH)	122	386	886	1,979	2,412	0.22%	0.41%	0.75%	1.40%	1.57%
Native Hawaiian or Pacific Islander alone (NH)	x	x	29	33	43	x	x	0.02%	0.02%	0.03%
Other race alone (NH)	18	20	45	129	517	0.03%	0.02%	0.04%	0.09%	0.34%
Mixed race or Multiracial (NH)	x	x	1,055	1,777	5,796	x	x	0.89%	1.26%	3.77%
Hispanic or Latino (any race)	765	1,702	3,141	6,584	9,241	1.40%	1.82%	2.66%	4.66%	6.01%
Total	54,703	93,515	118,085	141,236	153,843	100.00%	100.00%	100.00%	100.00%	100.00%

A map of the 2023 racial demographics in Citrus County, Florida by Census tract Legend: Non-Hispanic White 70–80% 80–90% >90%

=== 2000 census ===
As of the census of 2000, 118,085 people, 52,634 households, and 36,317 families resided in the county. The population density was 78 per square kilometre (200/sq mi). The 62,204 housing units averaged 41 per square kilometre (110/sq mi). The racial makeup of the county was 95.05% White, 2.36% Black or African American, 0.36% Native American, 0.76% Asian, 0.03% Pacific Islander, 0.37% from other races, and 1.07% from two or more races. About 2.66% of the population were Hispanics or Latinos of any race.

Of the 52,634 households, 19% had children under the age of 18 living with them, 58.30% were married couples living together, 7.60% had a female householder with no husband present, and 31% were not families. About 26.10% of all households were made up of individuals, and 15.60% had someone living alone who was 65 years of age or older. The average household size was 2.20 and the average family size was 2.60.

In the county, the population was distributed as 17.20% under the age of 18, 4.60% from 18 to 24, 19.10% from 25 to 44, 26.90% from 45 to 64, and 32.20% who were 65 years of age or older. The median age was 53 years. For every 100 females, there were 92.30 males. For every 100 females age 18 and over, there were 89.60 males.

== Economy ==
=== Personal income ===
The median income for a household in the county was $31,001, and for a family was $36,711. Males had a median income of $28,091 versus $21,408 for females. The per capita income for the county was $18,585. Around 11.70% of the population and 8.50% of families were below the poverty line; 18.10% of those under the age of 18 and 7.00% of those 65 and older were living below the poverty line.

=== Labor ===
More than one-third of residents were senior citizens in 2014. Health care dominates the work force.

== Transportation ==
=== Airports ===
- Citrus County is served by two local airports, Crystal River Airport and Inverness Airport.

=== Railroads ===
One rail line operates within the county: A freight line to the Crystal River Energy Complex in northern Citrus County. Other lines that used to run through Citrus were either converted into rail trails such as the Cross Town Trail in Crystal River and Withlacoochee State Trail in eastern Citrus County or abandoned.

=== Major roads ===
- SR 589 (Suncoast Parkway) runs north to south due to the recent expansion of the Suncoast Parkway from Hernando County (N.B. the Suncoast Parkway is considered incomplete; there are plans for it to extend through northern and northwestern Citrus County and head into Red Level.)
- US 19 (SR 55/Suncoast Boulevard) is the main local road through western Citrus County, running south to north.
- US 41 (SR 45/Florida Avenue) is the main local road through eastern Citrus County, running south to north. North of CR 48 in Floral City, the road is also shared by the DeSoto Trail.
- US 98 (SR 700/Ponce de Leon Boulevard) runs northwest to southeast from Hernando County, Florida, and joins US 19 in Chassahowitzka on its way to Perry.
- SR 44 (Gulf-to-Lake Highway) runs east and west through the northern part of the county from Crystal River into Sumter County. A county extension south of the western terminus runs into Fort Island.
- CR 48 runs mostly east and west through Southeastern Citrus County. It spans from US 41 Floral City winding southeast along the Withlacoochee River, which it eventually crosses on the way to Bushnell and Center Hill in Sumter County, and Howey-in-the Hills in Lake County. The segment in Bushnell between I-75 (Exit 314) and US 301 was a state road until the end of 2016. Throughout Citrus County, County Road 48 is also shared by the DeSoto Trail.
- CR 480 is the southernmost county road in Citrus County. It runs east and west from Chassahowitzka with a short concurrency with US 98, then through the Withlacoochee State Forest where it eventually terminates at US 41 in Floral City, south of CR 48.
- CR 490 runs east and west from the Gulf of Mexico along the south side of the Homosassa River until it briefly joins US 19–98 in downtown Homosassa Springs only to head northeast towards SR 44 in Lecanto.
- CR 491 (Lecanto Highway): A Bi-County road that begins in unincorporated northwestern Hernando County, then runs north and south along the western side of the Withlacoochee State Forest, and into Lecanto and Beverly Hills where it curves east in northern Citrus County and crosses US 41 in Holder, only to terminate at SR 200 near the Citrus-Marion County Line.
- CR 581: Runs north and south along the eastern side of the Withlacoochee State Forest from County Road 481 in Lake Lindsey, into Inverness where it joins SR 44 east towards US 41, only to branch off on its own as a dead end street on the banks of the Withlacoochee River.

== Communities ==
=== Cities ===
- Crystal River
- Inverness

=== Census-designated places ===
- Beverly Hills
- Black Diamond
- Citrus Hills
- Citrus Springs
- Floral City
- Hernando
- Homosassa
- Homosassa Springs
- Inverness Highlands North
- Inverness Highlands South
- Lecanto
- Pine Ridge
- Sugarmill Woods

=== Other unincorporated communities ===
- Chassahowitzka
- Holder
- Meadowcrest
- Pineola
- Red Level

=== Former towns ===
- Mannfield (original county seat, now a ghost town)
- Orleans
- Stage Pond (Cemetery still remains)
- Arlington
- Fairmount (town site is now Meadowcrest Industrial Park)

== Government ==
=== Citrus County Fire and Rescue ===
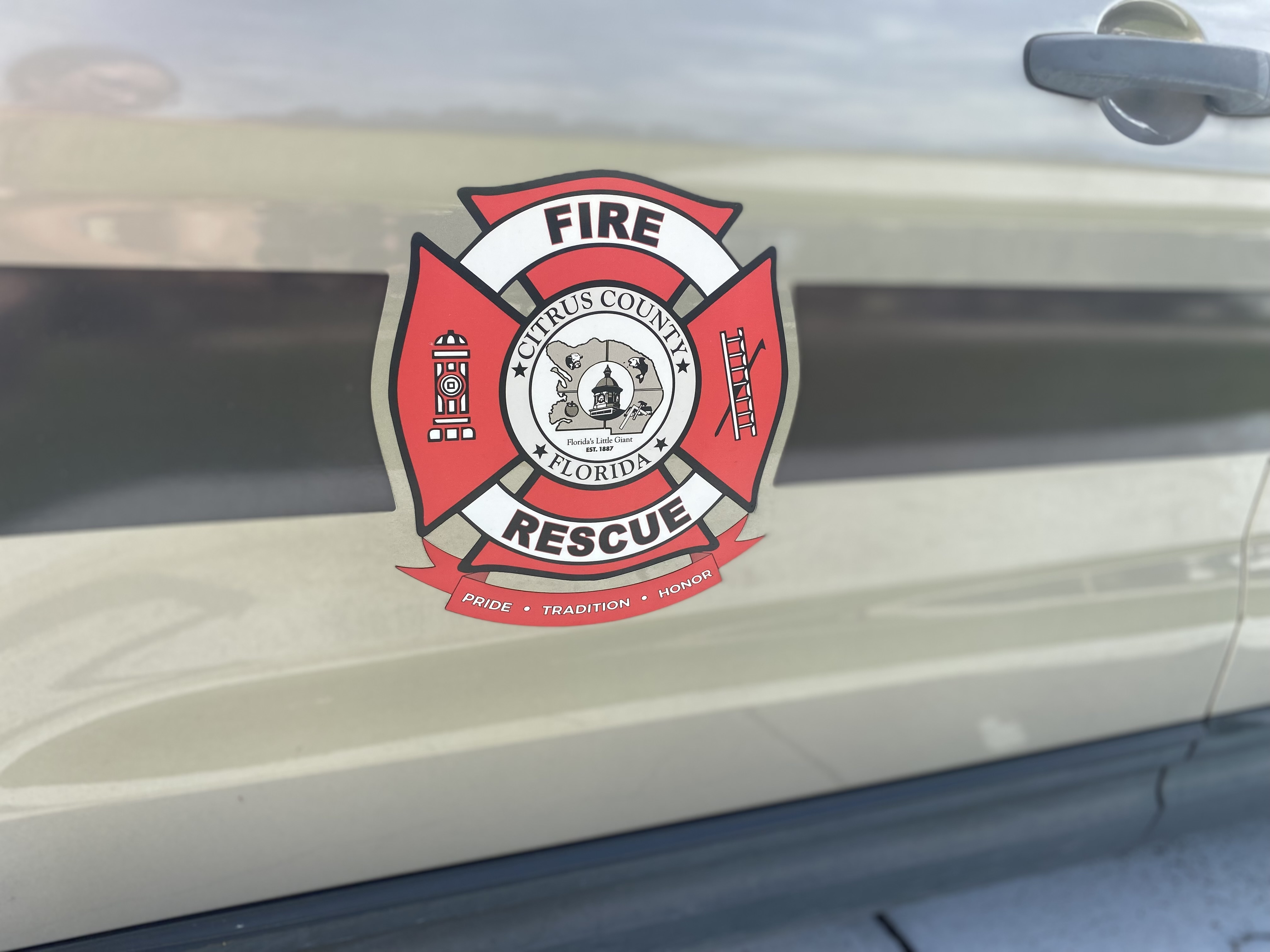
Citrus County Fire and Rescue emblem

Citrus County Fire and Rescue first began serving the community in 1974.

In 2025, Citrus County Fire and Rescue (CCFR) received over $2 million in grants from the Department of Homeland Security and Federal Emergency Management Agency, in order to expand their hiring and upgrade their equipment.

=== Libraries ===
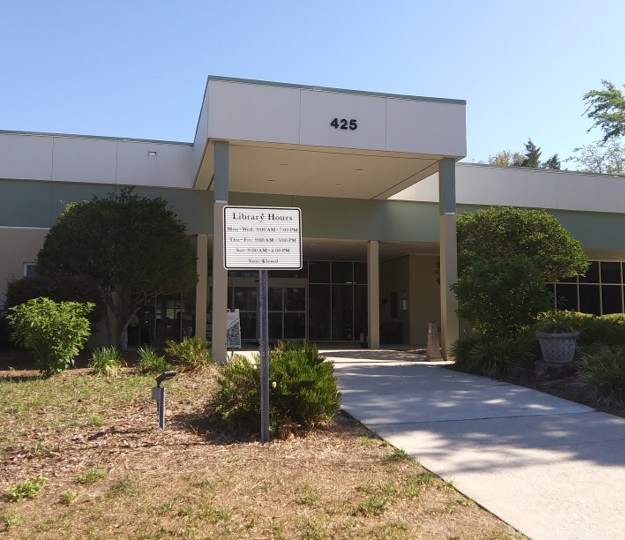
Central Ridge Library (Beverly Hills)

Libraries within Citrus County were originally separate and overseen by different local organizations. In 1961, the libraries of Crystal River, Floral City, Hernando, Homosassa, and Inverness joined the Central Florida Regional Library System along with Levy and Marion Counties. The Citrus County Library System was established on October 1, 1987. In 1996, the libraries became connected to the Internet and were able to access online resources and materials.

There are five branches of the Citrus County Library System:

- Beverly Hills (Central Ridge)
- Crystal River (Coastal Region)
- Floral City
- Homosassa
- Inverness (Lakes Region)

=== Elections ===
==== Voter registration ====
According to the Secretary of State's office, Republicans comprise a majority of registered voters in Citrus County.

Citrus County Voter Registration and Party Enrollment as of November 6, 2021
Political party	Total voters	Percentage
Republican	60,821	51.73%
Democratic	27,112	23.06%
other party affiliation	29,634	25.21%
Total	117,564	100.00%

==== Federal and state offices ====
Citrus County has voted Republican in national elections since 2000 and has voted Republican in state and local races before the 21st century. As of 2015, Republicans held the federal representative, state senator, and state representative seats serving the county, occupied all seats on the Citrus County Commission, and held nearly all other separately elected offices in the county. In 2016 the county broke heavily for Donald Trump, giving him 67% of the vote, the largest of any candidate since President Nixon in 1972. Trump broke his own record in both subsequent elections (2020 and 2024).

The county has been trending heavily Republican for the past few decades, with Democratic registration declining for at least the past 15 years.

United States presidential election results for Citrus County, Florida
Year	Republican		Democratic		Third party(ies)	
Year	No.	%	No.	%	No.	%
1892	0	0.00%	316	80.82%	75	19.18%
1896	35	8.54%	347	84.63%	28	6.83%
1900	16	3.57%	413	92.19%	19	4.24%
1904	21	5.04%	369	88.49%	27	6.47%
1908	33	7.43%	371	83.56%	40	9.01%
1912	11	2.19%	417	82.90%	75	14.91%
1916	46	6.62%	601	86.47%	48	6.91%
1920	94	11.93%	651	82.61%	43	5.46%
1924	30	5.94%	423	83.76%	52	10.30%
1928	505	37.77%	816	61.03%	16	1.20%
1932	147	10.84%	1,209	89.16%	0	0.00%
1936	159	10.43%	1,366	89.57%	0	0.00%
1940	194	11.05%	1,561	88.95%	0	0.00%
1944	264	16.58%	1,328	83.42%	0	0.00%
1948	461	27.91%	940	56.90%	251	15.19%
1952	1,249	47.85%	1,361	52.15%	0	0.00%
1956	1,570	50.69%	1,527	49.31%	0	0.00%
1960	1,861	51.82%	1,730	48.18%	0	0.00%
1964	2,329	48.02%	2,521	51.98%	0	0.00%
1968	2,767	38.71%	1,775	24.83%	2,606	36.46%
1972	8,848	77.22%	2,607	22.75%	3	0.03%
1976	7,973	45.03%	9,438	53.30%	296	1.67%
1980	14,286	58.48%	9,162	37.50%	982	4.02%
1984	20,764	66.47%	10,468	33.51%	4	0.01%
1988	21,072	62.95%	12,184	36.40%	218	0.65%
1992	16,412	36.68%	15,937	35.62%	12,397	27.71%
1996	20,125	40.57%	22,044	44.44%	7,431	14.98%
2000	29,801	52.06%	25,531	44.60%	1,916	3.35%
2004	39,500	56.86%	29,277	42.15%	690	0.99%
2008	43,706	57.13%	31,460	41.12%	1,343	1.76%
2012	44,662	60.22%	28,460	38.37%	1,047	1.41%
2016	54,456	67.72%	22,789	28.34%	3,167	3.94%
2020	65,352	69.98%	27,092	29.01%	944	1.01%
2024	71,356	72.41%	26,276	26.67%	908	0.92%

United States Senate election results for Citrus County, Florida1
Year	Republican		Democratic		Third party(ies)	
Year	No.	%	No.	%	No.	%
2024	66,837	68.99%	27,975	28.88%	2,062	2.13%

United States Senate election results for Citrus County, Florida3
Year	Republican		Democratic		Third party(ies)	
Year	No.	%	No.	%	No.	%
2022	55,087	72.54%	19,634	25.86%	1,217	1.60%

Florida Gubernatorial election results for Citrus County
Year	Republican		Democratic		Third party(ies)	
Year	No.	%	No.	%	No.	%
2022	56,283	74.23%	19,100	25.19%	443	0.58%

== Media ==
The Citrus County newspaper of record is the Citrus County Chronicle, a daily. It is published by Landmark Media Enterprises. A second paper, The Newscaster, also circulates in Citrus County but is located in neighboring Marion County.

Other online news sources include the Groundhog News, Citrus Daily, Real News Real Fast, Sunshine Standard and Citrus Times Online.

The local TV station is WYKE-CD.

The county is part of the Nielsen-designated Tampa-Saint Petersburg-Sarasota television market. Spectrum and Comcast serve different areas of Citrus County, with Spectrum serving the western part of the county, including Crystal River; and Comcast serving Inverness, and the eastern county communities; these systems offer most Tampa Bay stations, plus selected channels from the Orlando and Gainesville markets.

Radio stations in Citrus County are part of the Arbitron-designated Gainesville/Ocala radio market.

== See also ==
- Citrus County School District
- National Register of Historic Places listings in Citrus County, Florida
- Fort Island Gulf Beach
