= Lake Townsen Regional Park =

Park in Hernando County, Florida, United States

Coordinates: 28.6507°N 82.277°W

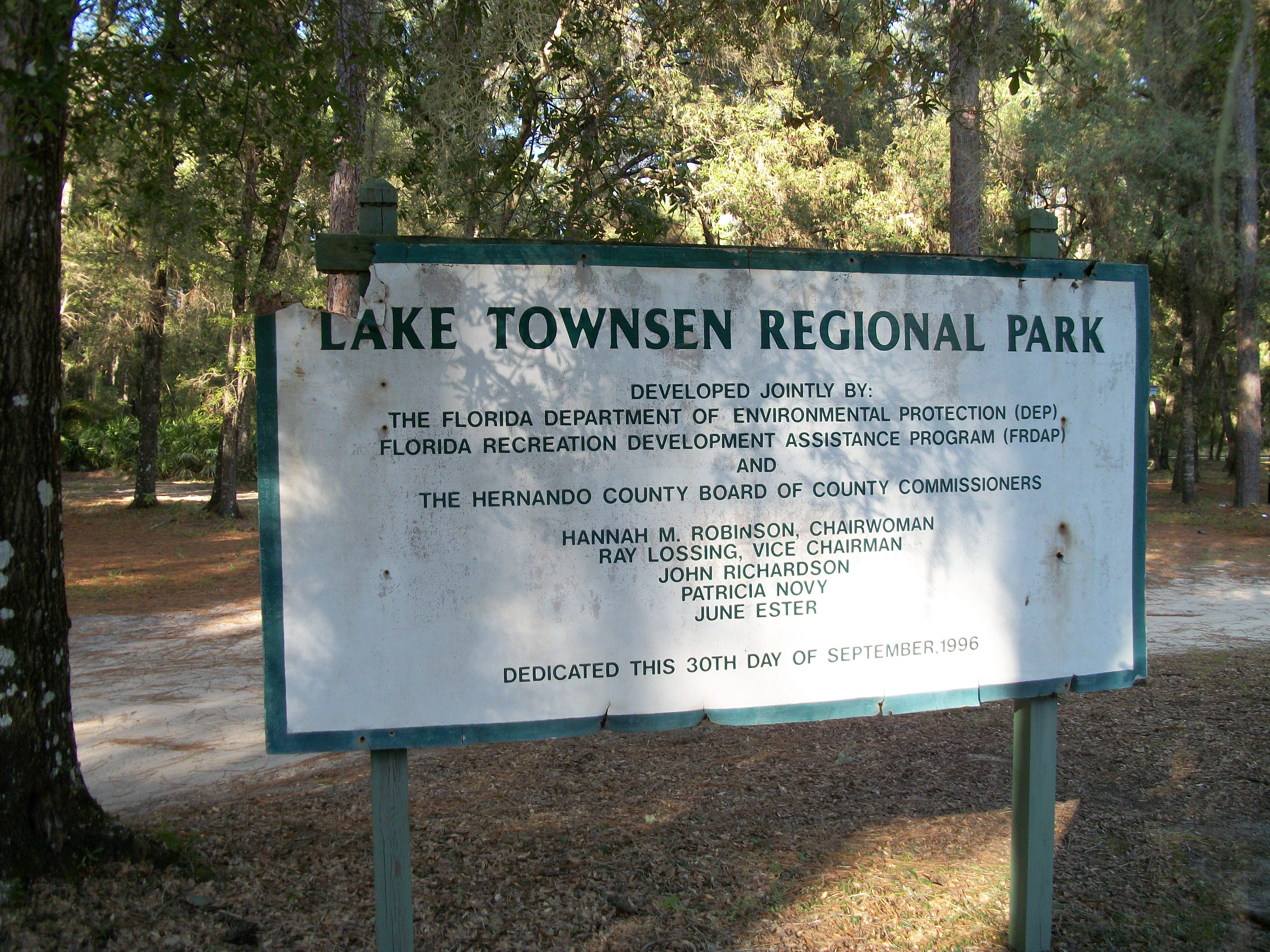
Damaged sign inside Lake Townsen Regional Park.

Lake Townsen Regional Park is a park located in northeastern Hernando County, Florida, United States. Although Hernando County Department of Parks gives the address as being in Brooksville, it is actually closer to Istachatta. The park occupies 375 acres (152 ha) and includes trails for jogging, hiking, bicycling, and horseback riding. These trails connect with the Withlacoochee State Trail. The park also has fields for baseball, basketball, volleyball and horseshoes as well a picnic areas and a playground.
