= Nature Coast =

Region in Florida

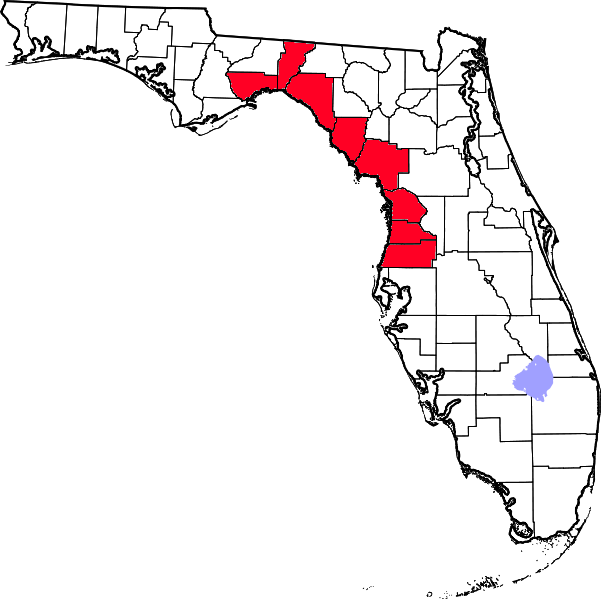
Map of Florida's Nature Coast

The Nature Coast is an informal, unofficial region of the U.S. state of Florida. The broadest definition of the Nature Coast includes the eight counties where Florida meets the Gulf of Mexico along the Big Bend Coast as defined by geologists (different than the Big Bend region of northern Florida). From west to east the counties are Wakulla, Jefferson, Taylor, Dixie, Levy, Citrus, Hernando, and Pasco.

== History ==
The name "Nature Coast" was originally devised as part of a marketing campaign to promote tourism in Levy, Citrus, Hernando, and parts of Marion and Pasco counties and offically adpoted in 1994 by Lawton Chiles .

The lower southern end (Pasco, Hernando, and Citrus County) are often considered part of the Tampa Bay Area.

== Economy ==
Like most of Florida, the nature coast is a mix of tourism, healthcare and natural resources, with Ecotourism being a large part of many of the local economies. Historically this area was known for their export of citrus, today this area supplies the nation with cattle, vegetables, and timber as well as fishing in coastal counties.

== Nature ==
Florida's Nature Coast is home to several habitats that allows many native and non-native plants and animals. Florida's Nature coast has freshwater springs and rivers, pine and oak forests, wetlands, brackish creeks, estuaries, salt marshes, and access to the Gulf coast. This area has the largest, intact coastal marsh system left in Florida where the rivers meet the sea. This supports all types of wildlife including White-tailed deer, wild pigs, roseate spoonbills, alligators, raccoons, opossums, snakes, great blue herons, egrets, Sea Turtles, and Gopher Tortoises and while there are not any endangered animals limited to the Nature Coast, there are several endangered animals in this region.

== State Parks, Preserves, and Historical Sites ==
=== Citrus ===
Chassahowitzka National Wildlife Refuge, partly in Hernando County
Crystal River Archaeological State Park
Crystal River National Wildlife Refuge
Crystal River Preserve State Park
Homosassa Springs Wildlife State Park
Lake Rousseau
Withlacoochee State Trail
Yulee Sugar Mill Ruins State Historic Site
Fort Cooper State Park

=== Hernando ===
Weeki Wachee Springs
Green Swamp (Partially)
The Heritage Museum

=== Jefferson ===
Letchworth Mounds
Econfina River State Park

=== Levy ===
Cedar Key Museum State Park
Cedar Key Scrub State Reserve
Cedar Keys National Wildlife Refuge
Fanning Springs State Park
Manatee Springs State Park
Waccasassa Bay Preserve State Park
Goethe State Forest

=== Marion ===
Rainbow Springs State Park
Silver Springs State Park
Marjorie Harris Carr Cross Florida Greenway
Shangri-La Trailhead & Campground
Santos Trailhead & Campground
Ross Prairie Trailhead & Campground
Price's Scrub State Park
Dunnellon Trail

=== Pasco ===
Pioneer Florida Museum and Village
Starkey Wilderness Preserve
Werner-Boyce Salt Springs State Park
Conner Preserve
Cypress Creek Preserve
Green Swamp (Partially)

=== Taylor ===
Forest Capital Museum State Park

=== Wakulla ===
Bradwell Bay Wilderness
Edward Ball Wakulla Springs State Park
Ochlockonee River State Park
San Marcos de Apalache Historic State Park
St. Marks National Wildlife Refuge
Tallahassee-St. Marks Historic Railroad Trail State Park

== Things to do ==
Common activities in this area includes:

- hunting
- fishing
- boating
- Bird watching
- Nature hiking
- Snorkeling (found in the rivers along the Nature Coast)
- Diving
- Manatee tours are available, predominantly in Crystal River, Homosassa and Homosassa Springs
- Golfing

== See also ==
- Florida panhandle
- First Coast
- I-4 corridor / Central Florida
- Space Coast
- Tampa Bay area
- Southwest Florida
- Treasure Coast
- Gold Coast, Florida
- Florida Keys
