= Deep Creek State Park =

Deep Creek State Park may refer to:

- Deep Creek State Forest, a state forest in St. Johns County, Florida
- Deep Creek Preserve, in DeSoto County, Florida
- Deep Creek Conservation Area, an area of protected lands in St. Johns County and Putnam County, Florida
