= Potts Preserve =

Protected property in Inverness, Citrus County, Florida, United States

Coordinates: 28.9289°N 82.3132°W

Potts Preserve is an 8,500-acre (34 km^{2}) property protected by the Southwest Florida Water Management District in Inverness, Florida (Citrus County). Wetlands in the preserve "play a role in both the Tsala Apopka Chain of Lakes and the Withlacoochee River systems." Biking, birdwatching, camping, horseback riding, boating, fishing, hiking and hunting, are offered in the park.
