= Flying Eagle Preserve =

Park in Inverness, Florida, United States

Coordinates: 28.805°N 82.2463°W

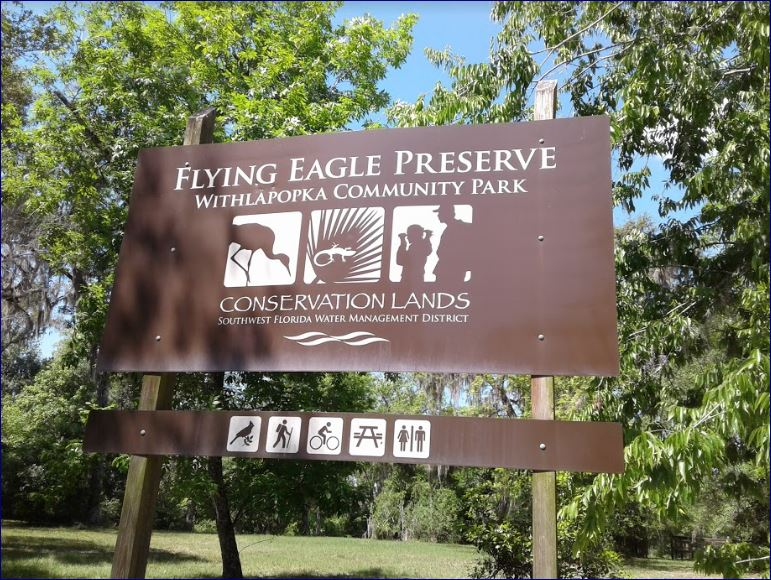
Flying Eagle Preserve

Flying Eagle Preserve is located in Inverness, Citrus County, Florida, and managed as part of the Southwest Florida Water Management District. The 10,950-acre (44.3 km^{2}) park is bounded on the east by the Withlacoochee River and is surrounded, in large part, by the Tsala Apopka Chain of Lakes. The preserve provides the setting for various aquatic and sporting activities.

McGregor Smith Scout Reservation was part of the preserve. The preserve also includes Withlapopka Community Park.

== Withlapopka Community Park ==
Withlapopka Community Park is a 50-acre (20 ha) area that was used by Citrus County as a dumping site for spoil dredged from canals. It includes an unpaved loop trail (about one mile (1.6 km) long) benches, picnic pavilion, picnic tables, and grills. It is used for frisbee golf (chipping and driving), horseshoes, tetherball and volleyball. There is also a swing and teeter-totter.
