= Ream Wilson Clearwater Trail =

Bicycling and pedestrian trail in Florida

- Length: 13 miles (21 km)
- Location: Clearwater, Florida
- Trailheads: West: East:
- Maintainer: The City of Clearwater

The Ream Wilson Clearwater Trail, also known as Clearwater East West Trail, is a 13-mile bicycling and pedestrian trail corridor under development in Clearwater, Florida. It connects areas near the Gulf of Mexico at Clearwater Beach to areas near Tampa Bay at Safety Harbor. Parking is available where the trail runs by the Long Center, Coachman Ridge Park, Northeast Coachman Park, Cliff Stephens Park, the Eddie C. Moore Recreation Complex, Del Oro Park, and Cooper's Bayou Park. The trail also connects to north–south trails including the Pinellas Trail and the Duke Energy Trail (along Duke Energy's right of way. Connecting many parks the trail offers opportunities to access nature walks, photography, picnics, and fishing.
