= Southwest Florida Water Management District =

Regional governmental district in Florida, United States

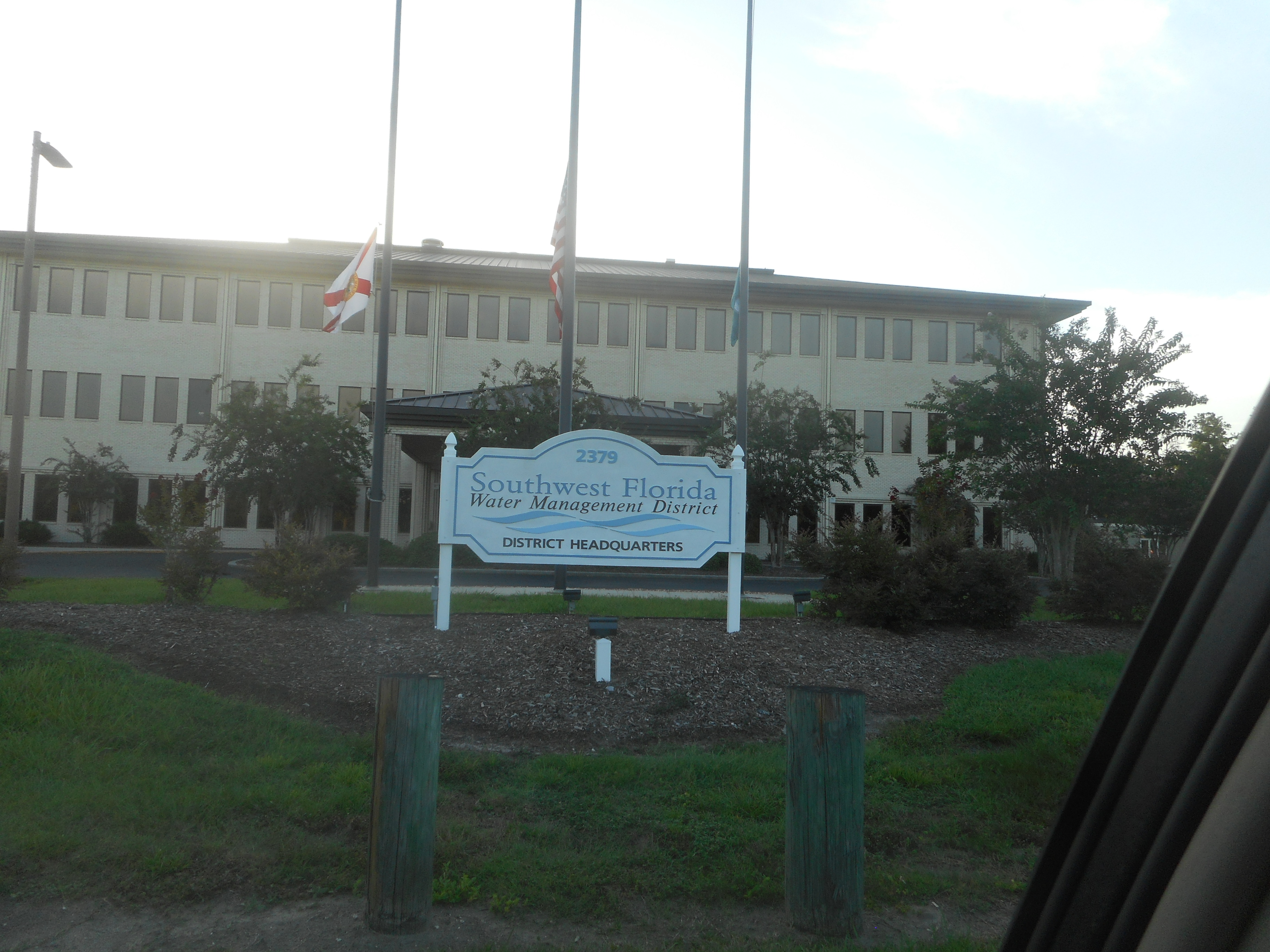
- SWFWMD headquarters along US 41 in Garden Grove, Florida

District overview
- Formed: 1961
- Jurisdiction: 16 counties in Florida: Charlotte; Citrus; DeSoto; Hardee; Hernando; Highlands; Hillsborough; Lake; Levy; Manatee; Marion; Pasco; Pinellas; Polk; Sarasota; Sumter
- Headquarters: 2379 Broad Street; Brooksville, Florida 34604
- Annual budget: $224.8 million (FY 2024)
- Parent District: Florida Department of Environmental Protection
- Website: WaterMatters.org

The Southwest Florida Water Management District (or SWFWMD, pronounced as "swiftmud" based on the word acronym) is one of five regional agencies directed by Florida state law to protect and preserve water resources. Established in 1961, the agency operates and maintains several large properties and flood protection projects, sometimes with other agencies. The District's responsibilities have expanded to include managing water supply and protecting water quality and the natural systems — rivers, lakes, wetlands, and associated uplands. The district's stated mission is to protect water resources, minimize flood risks, and ensure the public's water needs are met.

== Area of jurisdiction ==
The District encompasses approximately 10,000 square miles (30,000 km^{2}) in all or part of 16 counties in west-central Florida including Charlotte, Citrus, DeSoto, Hardee, Hernando, Highlands, Hillsborough, Lake, Levy, Manatee, Marion, Pasco, Pinellas, Polk, Sarasota, and Sumter counties, serving a population of more than 5.5 million people.

== Administration and funding ==
A 13-member governing board oversees the district activities. Members are unpaid volunteers appointed by the Governor and confirmed by the state Senate to four-year terms to set policy and administer the budget. The board chooses an executive director who is approved by the state Senate. The executive director oversees a diverse staff of professionals, including engineers, geologists, biologists, attorneys, educators, and administrators.

Funding comes from voter-approved ad valorem property taxes, along with state and federal funding such as the state's Florida Forever Program. While there is a legislative limit on the tax levy of 1 mill ($1 for each $1,000 of assessed land value), actual tax levies have been less than the maximum.

== Public recreation areas ==
Every year, about 2.5 million people visit public conservation lands acquired by the district and its partners to protect Florida's water resources. Properties in the district include:

- Alafia River Reserve in Polk County
- Annutteliga Hammock in Hernando County
- Brooker Creek Headwaters Nature Preserve in Hillsborough County
- Brooker Creek Preserve in Pinellas County
- Charlotte Harbor Preserve State Park in Charlotte County
- Chassahowitzka River and Coastal Swamps in Citrus County
- Chito Branch Reserve in Hillsborough County
- Circle B Bar Reserve in Polk County
- Cliff Stephens Park in Pinellas County
- Conner Preserve in Pasco County
- Cypress Creek Preserve in Pasco County
- Deep Creek Preserve in DeSoto County
- Edward Medard Park and Reservoir in Hillsborough County
- Edward W. Chance Reserve Coker Prairie and Gilley Creek tracts in Manatee County
- Flying Eagle Preserve in Citrus County
- McGregor Smith Scout Reservation in Citrus County
- Green Swamp Wilderness Preserve in Pasco, Sumter, Lake and Polk counties
- Colt Creek State Park in Polk County
- East Tract in Sumter, Lake and Polk counties
- Hampton Tract in Polk County
- Little Withlacoochee Tract in Lake County
- West Tract in Pasco County
- Half Moon-Gum Slough in Sumter County
- Hálpata Tastanaki Preserve in Marion County
- Jack Creek in Highlands County
- Lake Marion Creek Horseshoe Scrub Tract in Polk County
- Lake Panasoffkee in Sumter County
- Lake Tarpon Outfall Canal in Pinellas County
- Little Manatee River Lower Tract in Hillsborough County
- Little Manatee River Southfork Tract in Manatee County
- Little Manatee River Upper Tract in Hillsborough County
- Lower Hillsborough Wilderness Preserve in Hillsborough County
- Marshall Hampton Reserve in Polk County
- Deer Prairie Creek Preserve, Flatford Swamp Preserve, and Myakka Prairie Tract on the Myakka River in Sarasota, Manatee, and Sarasota counties
- Myakka State Forest in Sarasota County
- Panasoffkee Outlet in Sumter County
- Potts Preserve in Citrus County
- Prairie/ Shell Creek in Charlotte County
- RV Griffin Reserve in DeSoto County
- Sawgrass Lake Park in Pinellas County
- Schultz Preserve in Hillsborough County
- Starkey Wilderness Preserve, Serenova Tract and Anclote River Ranch Tract in Pasco County
- Tampa Bypass Canal in Hillsborough County
- Terra Ceia Preserve in Manatee County
- Two Mile Prairie in Citrus County
- Upper Hillsborough Preserve in Pasco and Polk counties
- Weeki Wachee Preserve in Hernando County
- Withlacoochee River Park in Pasco County
- Wysong Park in Sumter County

== See also ==
- Northwest Florida Water Management District
- St. Johns River Water Management District
- Suwannee River Water Management District
- Peace River Manasota Regional Water Supply Authority
