= Mobbly Bayou Preserve =

Nature preserve in Pinellas County, Florida

Coordinates: 28.0228°N 82.6541°W

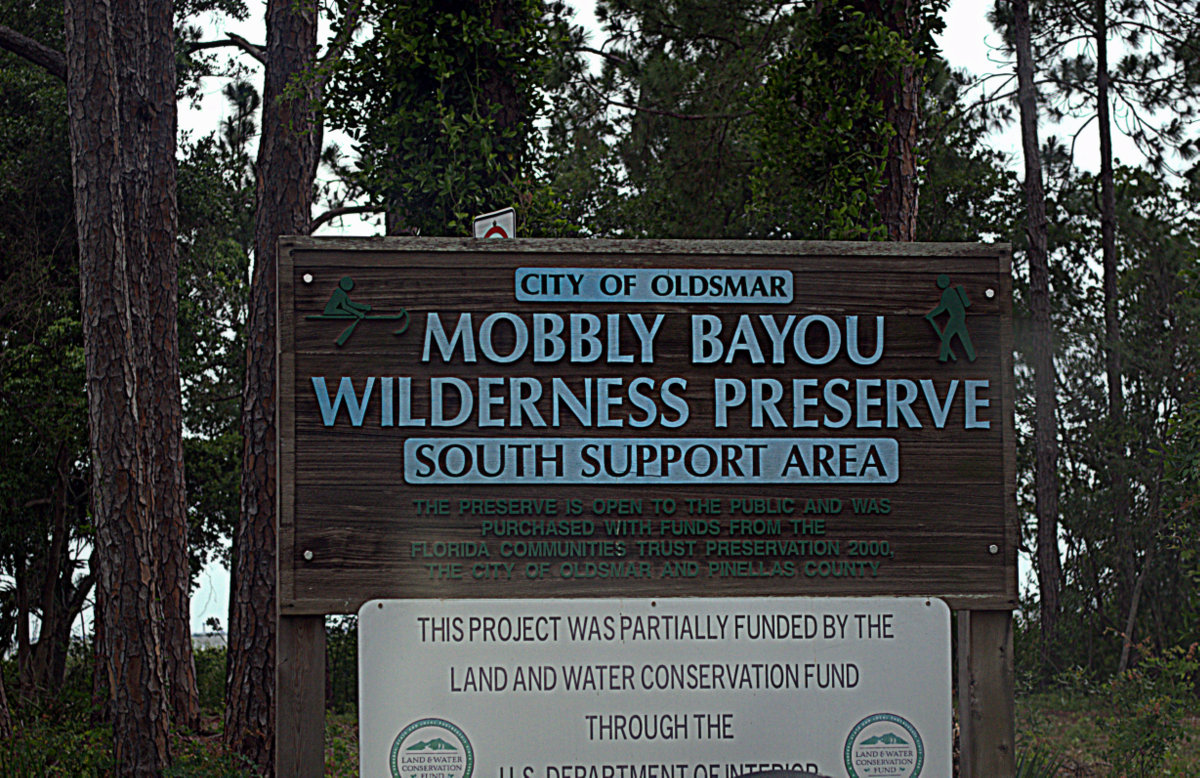
- Mobbly Bayou Wilderness Preserve Sign

- Location within Florida
- Location: Pinellas County, Florida
- Nearest city: Oldsmar, Florida
- Area: 360 acres (1.5 km^{2})
- Governing body: Southwest Florida Water Management District
- Website: www.myoldsmar.com/238/Mobbly-Bayou-Wilderness-Preserve

Mobbly Bayou Preserve is a 396-acre (160 ha) county preserve located at the north end of upper Tampa Bay in the city of Oldsmar in Pinellas County in the U.S. state of Florida. The preserve encompasses a wide diversity of upland and coastal plant communities. The preserve is managed through an interlocal agreement with the city of Oldsmar, which is responsible for managing two recreational areas.

Upland, intertidal, and subtidal communities in the bayou have suffered significant environmental distress due to dense urbanization. Approximately 200 acres (80 ha) are targeted for restoration and enhancement of coastal communities using the Southwest Florida Water Management District, Pinellas County, and City of Oldsmar Parks and Recreation Department. Two major goals are to restore the bayou's tidal creek system's hydrology and enhance the degraded vegetation communities by removing exotic species and planting native species.

== Features ==
- Canoe launch
- Janice Miller Bark Park Dog park
- Lynn Rives Environmental Education Center
- Fishing dock
- Free parking
- Lookout towers
- Playground
- Restrooms
- Shelters
- Trails
- Zip Line

== Gallery ==
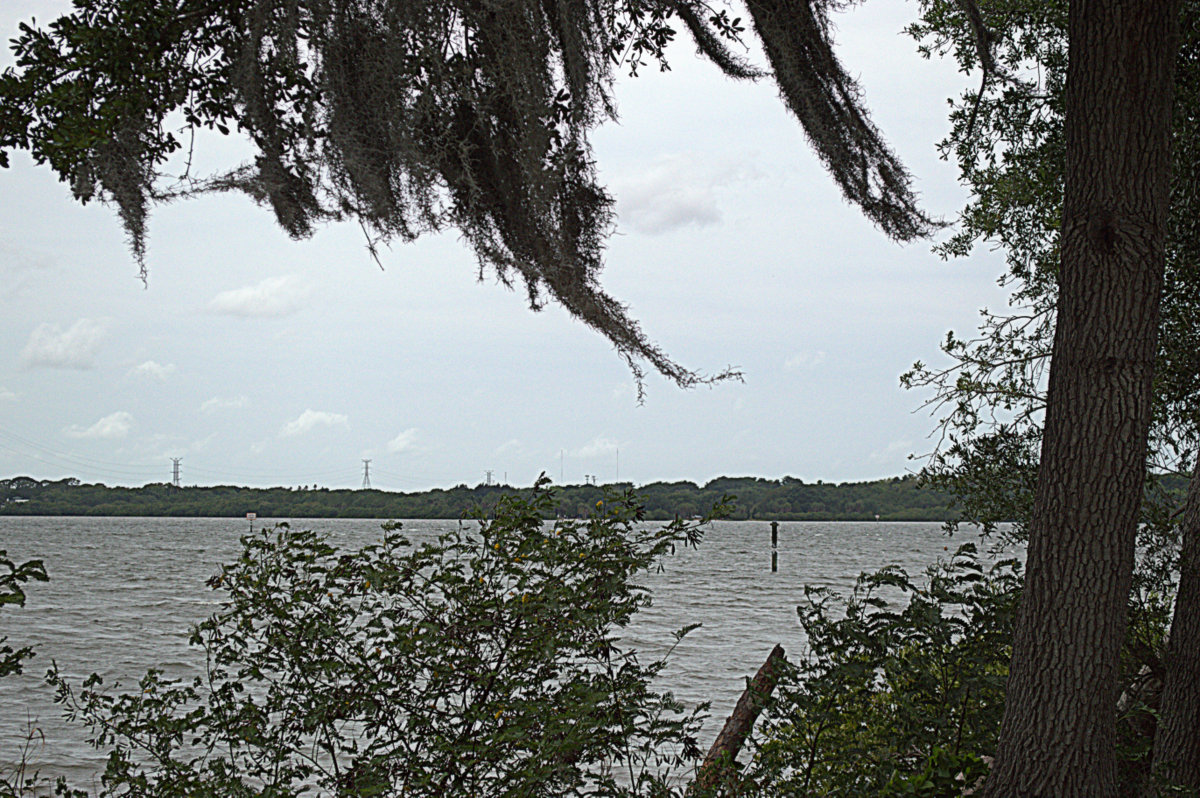
Mobbly Bayou Upper Tampa Bay View
