= RV Griffin Reserve =

Coordinates: 27°5′41″N 82°2′7″W

RV Griffin Reserve is located in DeSoto County, Florida, United States, at 8910 Kings Highway in Arcadia, Florida and includes 6,000 acres (24 km^{2}). The preserve is named for a county commissioner, is part of the Southwest Florida Water Management District and is managed by the Peace River Manasota Regional Water Supply Authority (PRMRWSA). Biking, horse trails, hiking, and picnic facilities are included on the property.
