= Conner Preserve =

Natural area in Pasco County, Florida, US

Coordinates: 28.3156°N 82.4487°W

Conner Preserve is a natural area in central Pasco County, Florida, preserved for water management since 2003. The landscape includes steep sandhill ridges, marshes, cypress sloughs and pine flatwoods and is "part of a wildlife habitat corridor envisioned by Pasco County and the Southwest Florida Water Management District that will eventually connect the Starkey Wilderness Preserve to the Cypress Creek Preserve, making a continuous corridor of several thousands of acres in this region." It is used recreationally for bicycling, horseback riding, hiking, camping, and model airplane flying. The park is located at 22500 on State Road 52 in Land o' Lakes, Florida. It is 2,980 acres (12.1 km^{2}) and open from sunrise to sunset.
