= Julington =

Julington may refer to:

- Julington Creek, a stream in Florida, United States
- Julington Creek Plantation, Florida, United States, an unincorporated community
- Julington-Durbin Preserve, a nature reserve in Florida, United States
