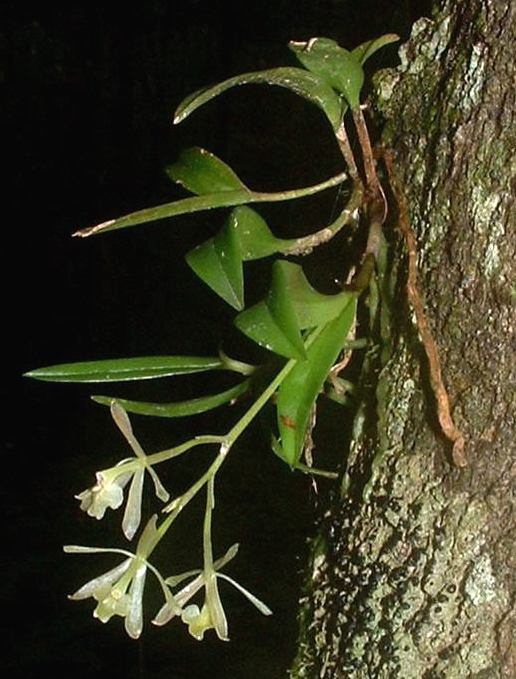

Scientific classification
- Kingdom: Plantae
- Clade: Tracheophytes
- Clade: Angiosperms
- Clade: Monocots
- Order: Asparagales
- Family: Orchidaceae
- Subfamily: Epidendroideae
- Genus: Epidendrum
- Subgenus: Epidendrum subg. Epidendrum
- Section: Epidendrum sect. Planifolia
- Subsection: Epidendrum subsect. Racemosa
- Species: E. conopseum

Binomial name
- Epidendrum conopseum R.Br.

Synonyms
- Amphiglottis conopsea (R.Br.) Small; Epidendrum magnoliae Muhl. ex Hágsater, nom. superfl.; Epidendrum conopseum var. mexicanum L.O.Williams; Epidendrum magnoliae var. mexicanum (L.O.Williams) P.M.Br.; Larnandra conopsea (R.Br.) Raf.; Larnandra magnolia Raf.

= Epidendrum conopseum =

Species of plant

Epidendrum conopseum, synonym Epidendrum magnoliae, sometimes called the green-fly orchid, is a species of orchid in the genus Epidendrum.

== Description ==
It has robust roots that cling to tree bark and short, often pendulous cane-shaped stems wrapped in tubular leaf sheaths. Each stem carries two or three leathery, elliptical leaves with acute or subacute tips. Leaves are broadly elliptical, up to 10 cm (3.9 in) long, thick and almost leathery. Flowering typically occurs from late autumn to spring, producing a terminal, racemose, erect, loose inflorescence about 16 cm long with a few flowers. One plant will produce 6-14 flowers that are a bit over 2 cm in diameter, pale green to bronze-colored. Sepals and petals are oblanceolate, the lip is three lobed at the apex.

The diploid chromosome number of E. conopseum has been determined as 2n = 40, the haploid chromosome number as n = 20.

== Distribution ==
It is the most northern-growing epiphytic orchid in North America, being found wild in the southeastern United States in Alabama, Florida, Georgia, Louisiana, Mississippi, North Carolina and South Carolina and also in northeastern Mexico (Nuevo León, San Luis Potosí, Tamaulipas). Epidendrum conopseum grows on the branches of evergreen and deciduous trees such as Magnolia grandiflora, Quercus virginiana, Taxodium distichum, Swamp Black Gum, or American beech, at low elevations less than 100 m (330 ft) above sea level. It is found growing in association with the fern Pleopeltis polypodioides

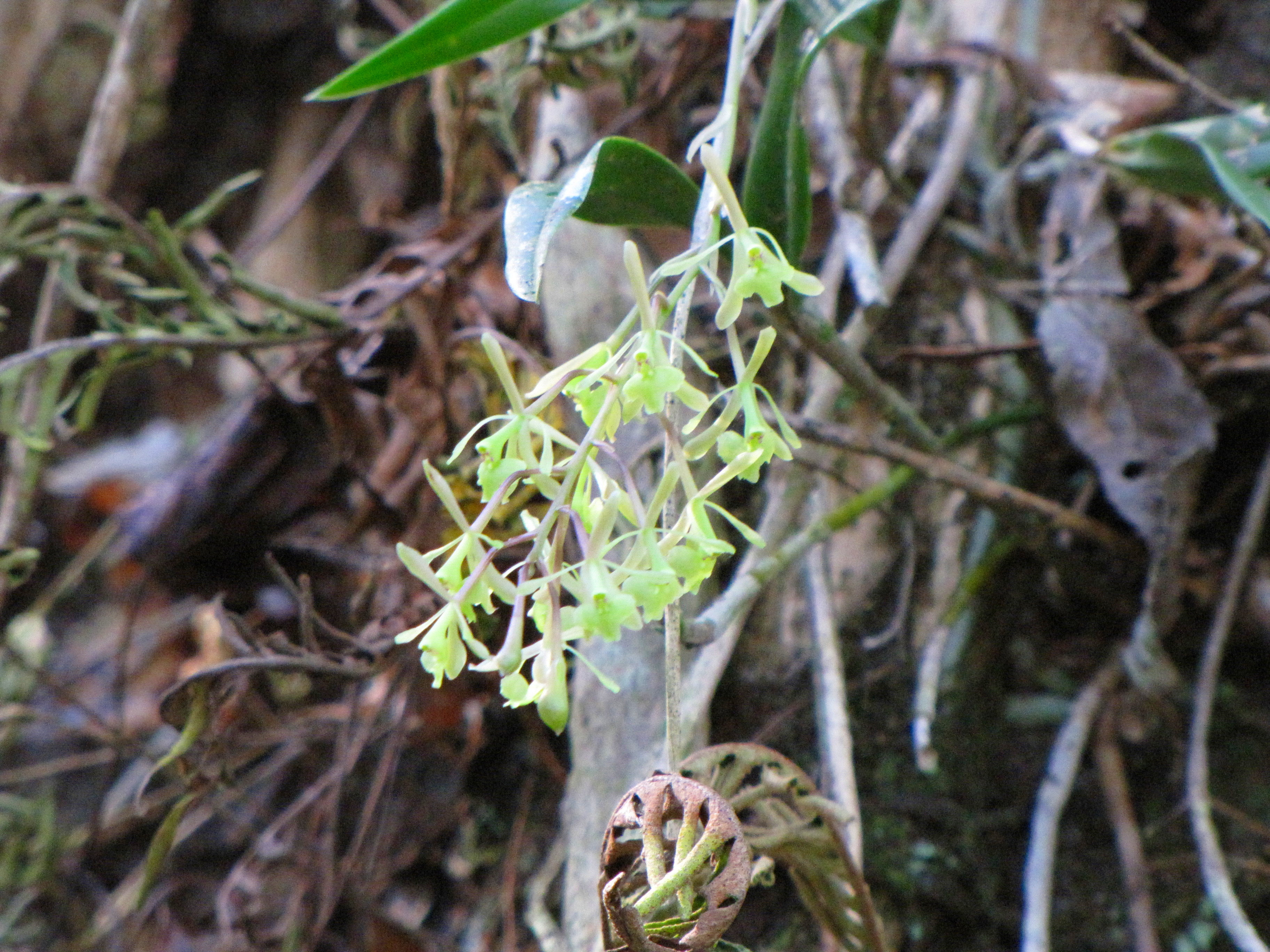
Epidendrum conopseum growing in Withlacoochee River Park

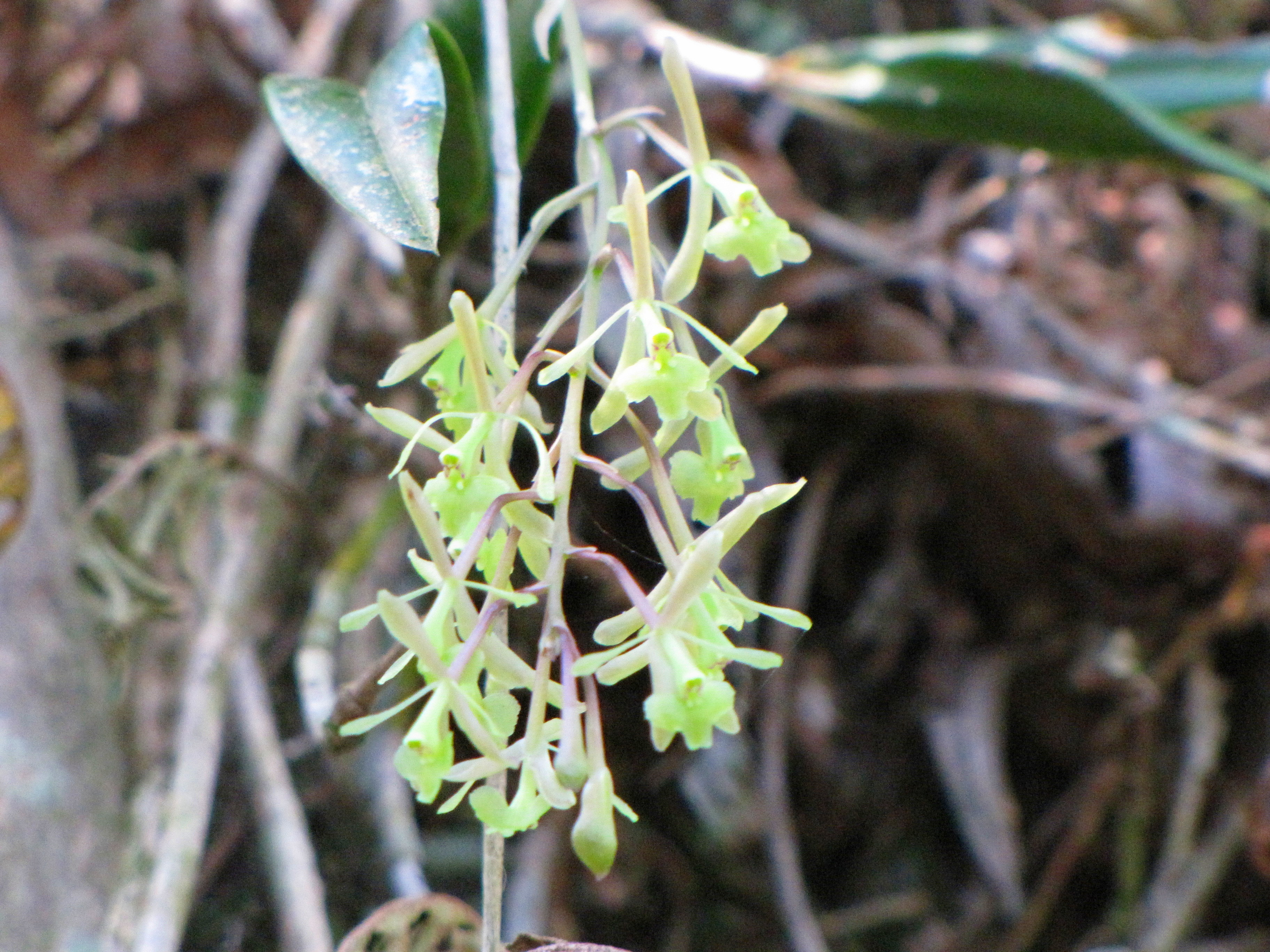
