= Brooker Creek Preserve =

Park in the US

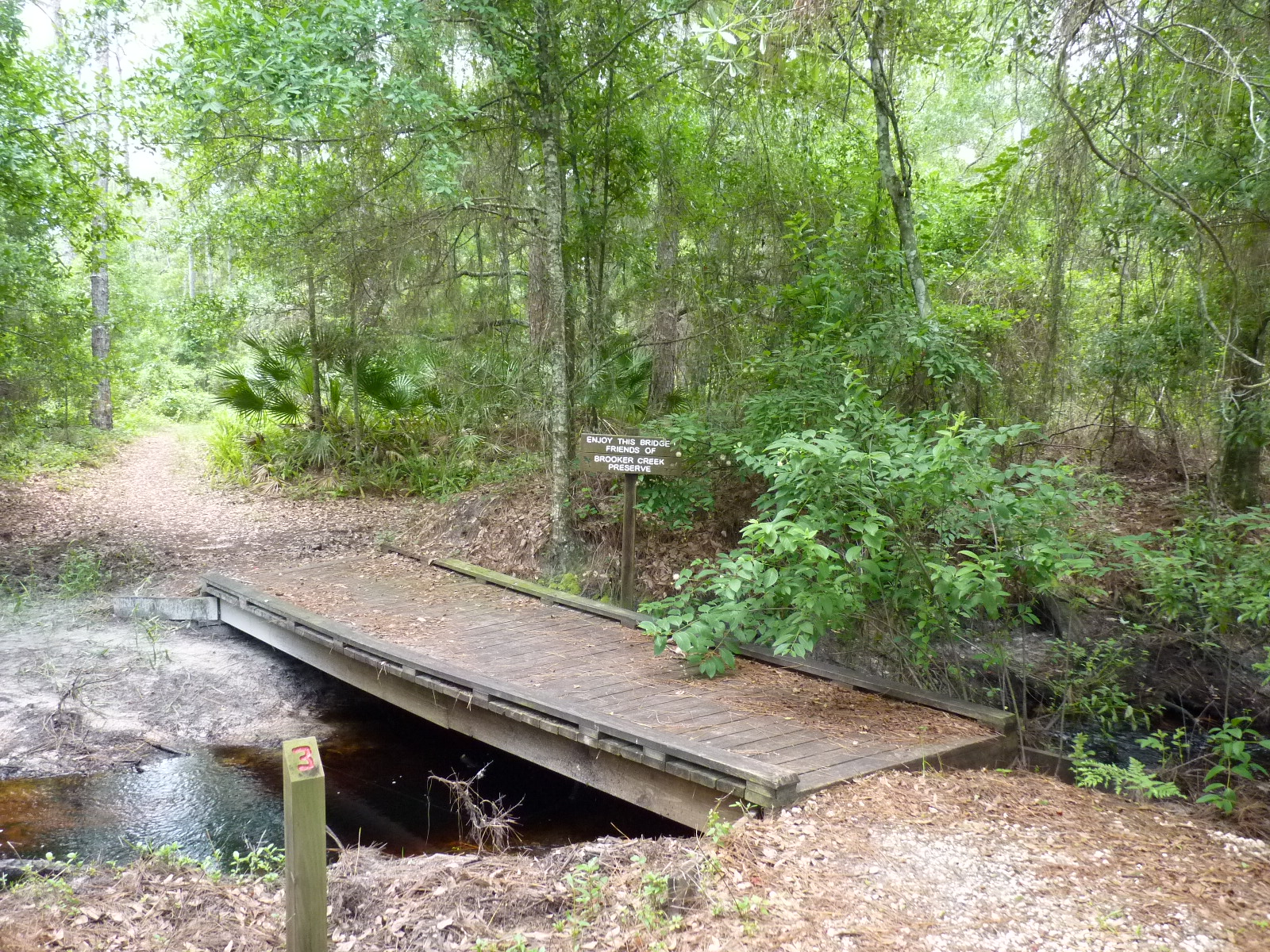
- A trail bridge built by Friends of Brooker Creek Preserve.

- Location within Florida
- Location: Pinellas County, Florida
- Nearest city: Tarpon Springs, Florida
- Coordinates: 28.1092°N 82.665°W
- Area: 8,700 acres (35 km^{2})
- Established: 1992
- Governing body: Southwest Florida Water Management District
- Website: www.brookercreekpreserve.org

Brooker Creek Preserve is located in Pinellas County, Florida, owned by the Pinellas County government and the Southwest Florida Water Management District, and managed by the Pinellas County Parks and Conservation Resources Department. It encompasses 8,700 acres (35km2) and offers birding, horseback riding, and hiking. The Preserve office is located at 3940 Keystone Road, Tarpon Springs, Florida,

The Brooker Creek Preserve Environmental Education Center features displays and interactive exhibits about Florida natural history and local history. Educational and interpretive programs are offered for the public.

== Aboriginal history ==
"Native people hunted and gathered here for thousands of years, leaving behind spear points that date from 7000 BCE to 900 CE." The most recent aboriginal tribe to occupy the land that encompasses the Brooker Creek Preserve was the Tocobaga tribe. The Tocobaga declined in the 17th century and became extinct in the 18th century due to disease and violence.

== Gallery ==
Photos added here are from the nature trail near the education center.

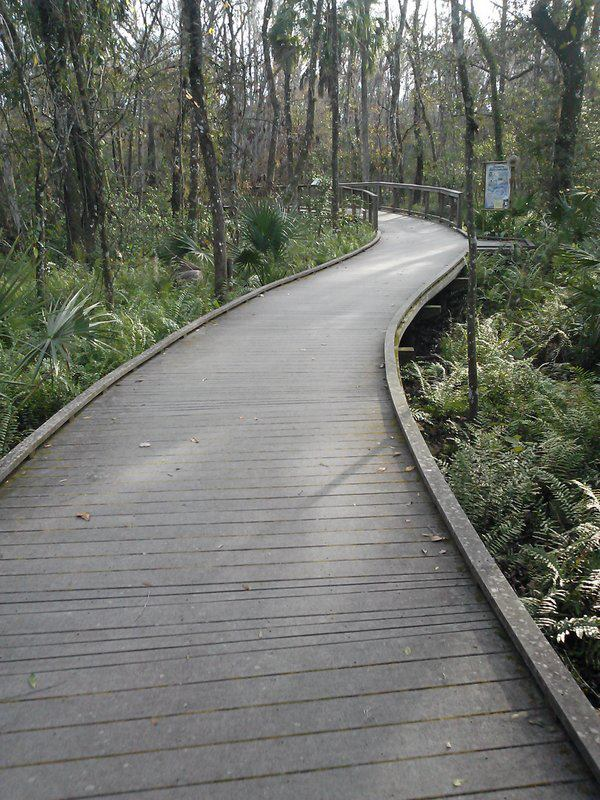
Brooker Creek nature walkway

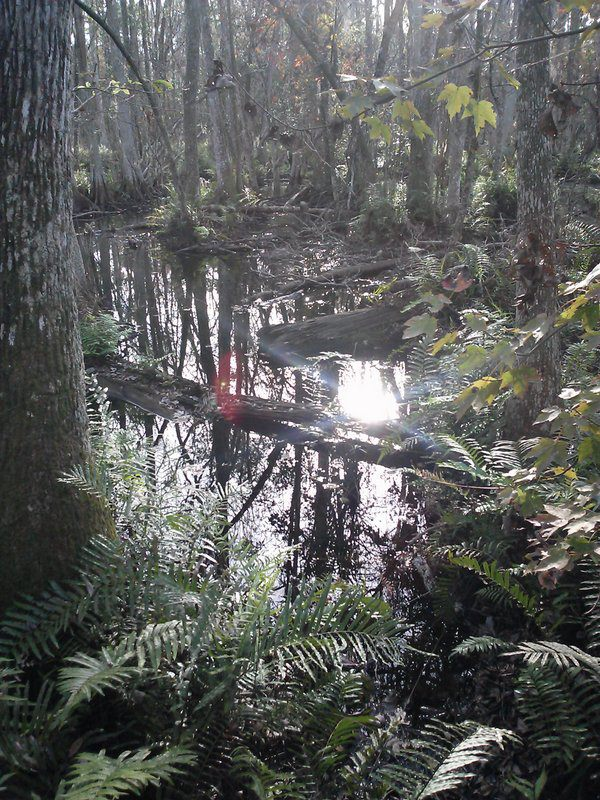
Brooker Creek nature walk

== See also ==
- Brooker Creek Headwaters Nature Preserve
