= James F. Sikes =

American politician

James F. Sikes (died 1938) was a state senator in Florida.

Sikes was born in Inverness, Florida. He graduated from the University of Florida.

Sikes was elected to the Florida Senate in 1932 and served until 1934.
