= Jack Creek (Florida) =

Coordinates: 27.362007°N 81.422389°W

Jack Creek is a water conservation area and park in Highlands County, Florida. It is part of the Southwest Florida Water Management District.
