= St. Johns River Water Management District =

One of five Florida water management districts

The St. Johns River Water Management District (SJRWMD) is one of five Florida water management districts that is responsible for managing groundwater and surface water resources in Florida. SJRWMD covers an 18-county region in northeast and east-central Florida.

It employs approximately 600 people at offices in Palatka, Jacksonville, Maitland, and Palm Bay. The district's headquarters is located in Palatka.

The budget for 2013–14 is $135.5 million.

== History ==
SJRWMD is one of five water management districts that were established in 1972 by Chapter 373, Florida Statutes, as independent special districts, and were empowered by the electorate in 1976 to assess ad valorem taxes to fund the management of the state's water and related land resources, to benefit people and the environment. Each water management district is administered by a Governing Board composed of residents appointed by the Governor and approved by the Florida Senate. All districts report directly to the governor.

In 2013, the District lost a case before the U.S. Supreme court in Koontz v. St. Johns River Water Management District.

== Area of Jurisdiction ==
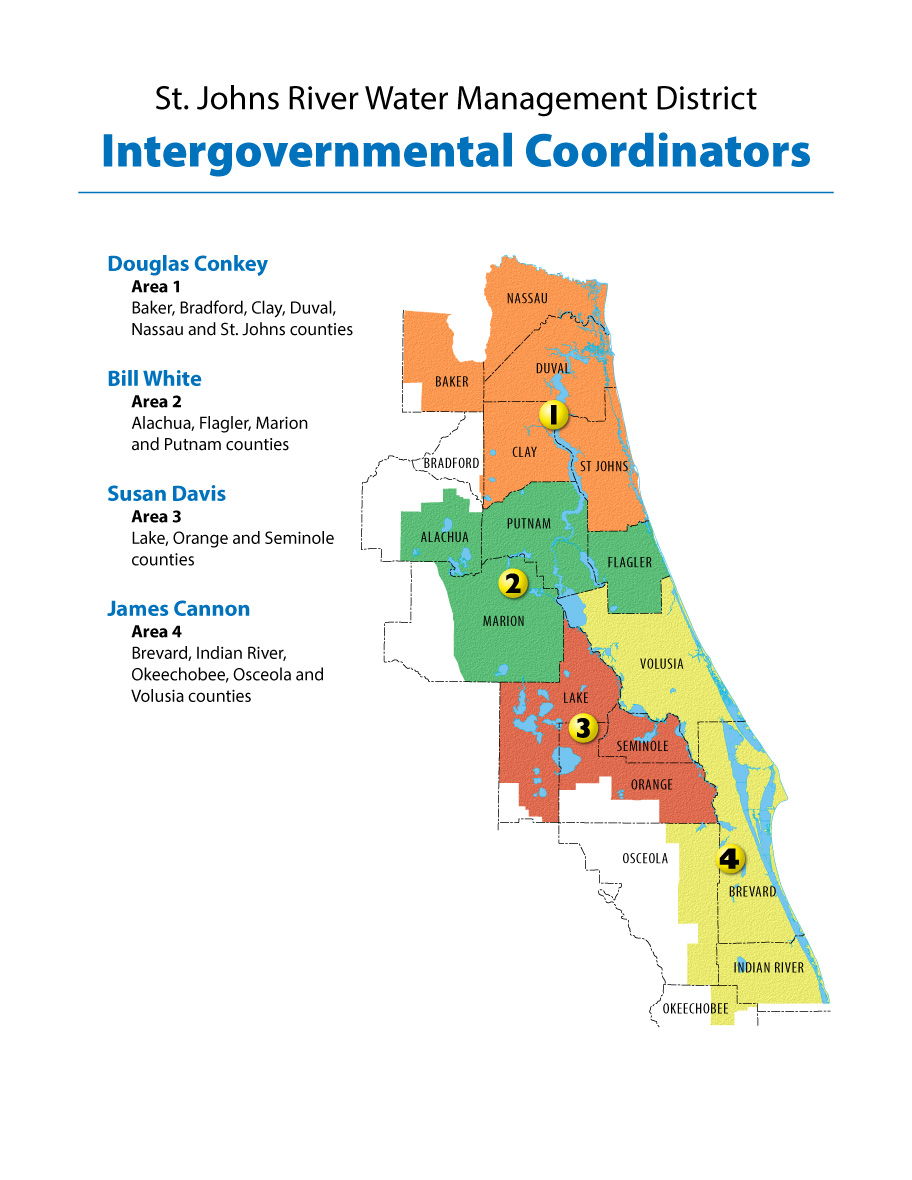
Jurisdiction map of the district

The counties which are entirely within SJRWMD are: Brevard, Clay, Duval, Flagler, Indian River, Lake, Marion, Nassau, St. Johns, Seminole, Putnam, and Volusia. Partial counties include: Alachua, Baker, Bradford, Okeechobee, Orange, and Osceola. SJRWMD covers 12,283 square miles (31,813 km²), or 23 percent of Florida. As of 2012, 4.73 million people (about 21 percent of the state's population) made their home in SJRWMD.

The major river within SJRWMD is the St. Johns River. The two major tributaries are the Econlockhatchee River and the Ocklawaha River. Other major waterways are the St. Marys River, which serves as the boundary between Florida and Georgia; and the Nassau, Ocklawaha, Matanzas, Halifax, and Indian rivers. SJRWMD contains 96 springs and more than 1,400 lakes.

== Public recreation areas ==
Many of the lands protected by the District are open to the public for recreational use.

- Black Creek Ravines Conservation Area
- Blue Cypress Conservation Area
- Buck Lake Conservation Area
- Canaveral Marshes Conservation Area
- Clark Bay Conservation Area
- Crescent Lake Conservation Area
- Deep Creek Conservation Area
- Dunns Creek Conservation Area
- Econlockhatchee Sandhills Conservation Area
- Emeralda Marsh Conservation Area
- Fellsmere Water Management Area
- Fort Drum Marsh Conservation Area
- Gourd Island Conservation Area
- Hal Scott Regional Preserve and Park
- Heart Island Conservation Area
- J.P. Hall Bayard Point Conservation Area
- Julington-Durbin Preserve
- Lake Apopka North Shore
- Lake George Conservation Area
- Lake Jesup Conservation Area
- Lake Monroe Conservation Area
- Lake Norris Conservation Area
- Lochloosa Wildlife Conservation Area
- Longleaf Flatwoods Reserve
- Micco Water Management Area
- Moses Creek Conservation Area
- Murphy Creek Conservation Area
- Newnans Lake Conservation Area
- Ocklawaha Prairie Restoration Area
- Orange Creek Restoration Area
- Palm Bluff Conservation Area
- Pellicer Creek Conservation Area
- Rice Creek Conservation Area
- River Lakes Conservation Area
- Seminole Ranch Conservation Area
- Silver Springs Forest Conservation Area
- Stokes Landing Conservation Area
- Sunnyhill Restoration Area
- Thomas Creek Conservation Area
- Three Forks Conservation Area
- Twelve Mile Swamp Conservation Area
- Wekiva River Buffer Conservation Area

== See also ==
- Northwest Florida Water Management District
- South Florida Water Management District
- Southwest Florida Water Management District
- Suwannee River Water Management District
