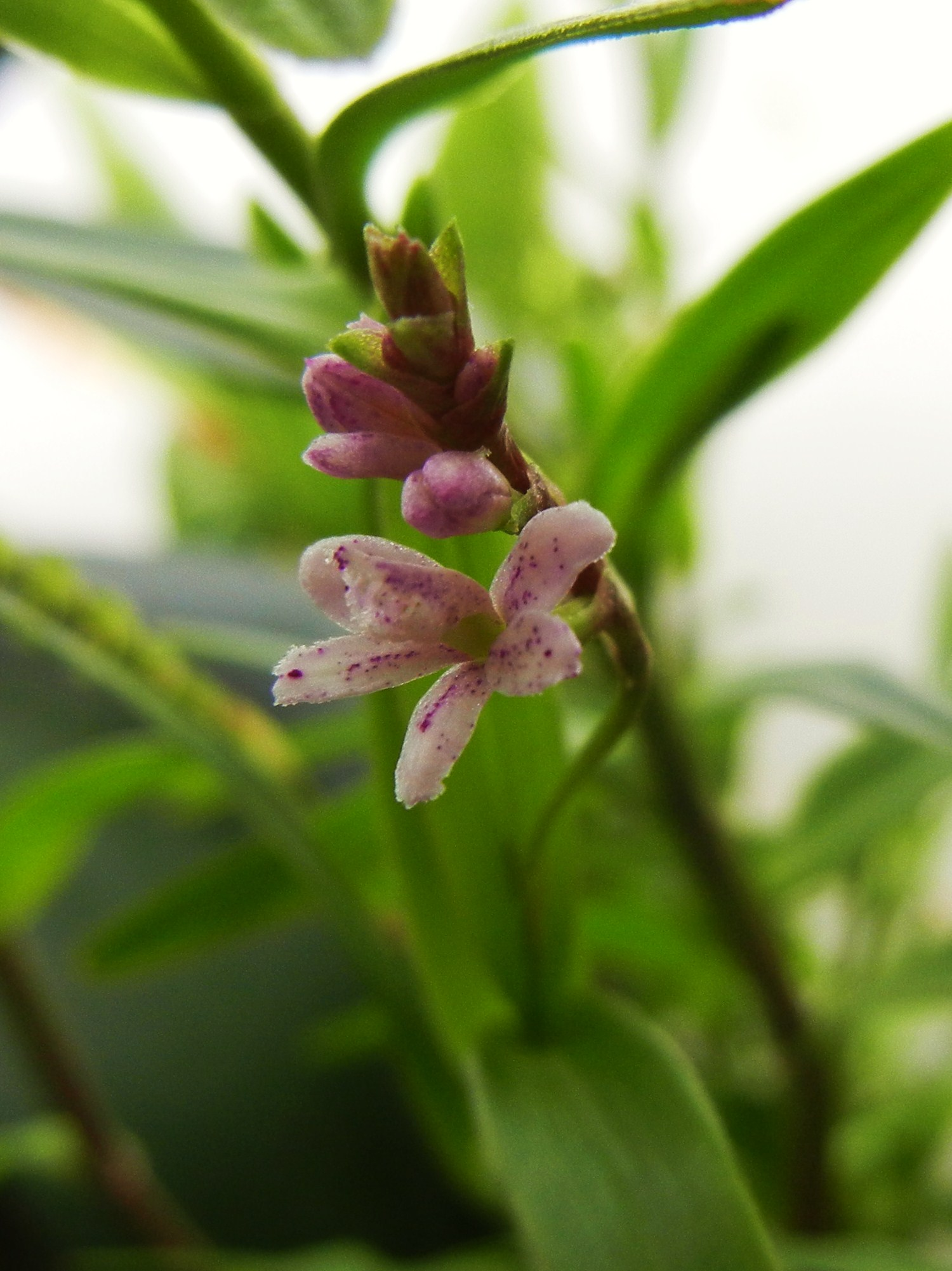

Scientific classification
- Kingdom: Plantae
- Clade: Tracheophytes
- Clade: Angiosperms
- Clade: Monocots
- Order: Asparagales
- Family: Orchidaceae
- Subfamily: Epidendroideae
- Genus: Epidendrum
- Subgenus: Epidendrum subg. Epidendrum
- Section: Epidendrum sect. Planifolia
- Subsection: Epidendrum subsect. Racemosa
- Species: E. fimbriatum

Binomial name
- Epidendrum fimbriatum Kunth

Synonyms
- Epidendrum alternans Lindl.; Epidendrum rhomboglossum Kraenzl.; Epidendrum integrilabium Ames & C.Schweinf.; Epidendrum fimbriatum var. rhomboglossum (Kraenzl.) C. Schweinf

= Epidendrum fimbriatum =

Species of plant

Epidendrum fimbriatum is a terrestrial (sometimes epiphytic) orchid native to high altitudes (2.2—3.4 km) in Bolivia, Colombia, Ecuador, Peru, and Venezuela.

First published in F.W.H.von Humboldt, A.J.A.Bonpland & C.S.Kunth, Nov. Gen. Sp. 1: 351 (1816)

== Description ==
Epidendrum fimbriatum produces rather slender stems without any tendency to produce pseudobulbs covered from the base to the last regular leaf with close, tubular imbricating sheaths which, on the upper part of the stem, bear distichous leathery ovate-oblong retuse leaves, up to 66 mm long by 6 mm wide. The apical inflorescence emerges from the last regular leaf uncovered by either sheath or spathe and terminates (usually) in a single congested raceme with floral bracts that can grow to nearly 1 cm long. The fleshy non-resupinate flowers are white to light rose with purple spots. The lanceolate to elliptic oblong sepals grow to nearly 6 mm long; the narrower petals are somewhat shorter. The fimbriated, unlobed, somewhat pointed lip is adnate to the column to near its middle, as is more typical of the genus Prosthechea.

== Homophony ==
Epidendrum fimbriatum Vell. (1831) nom. illeg. is a synonym for the different orchid, Laelia gloriosa (Rchb.f.) L.O.Williams (1941).

== Synonyms ==
- Epidendrum alternans Lindl. in J. Bot. (Hooker) 3: 88 (1841)
- Epidendrum integrilabium Ames & C.Schweinf. in Schedul. Orchid. 8: 46 (1925)
- Epidendrum rhomboglossum Kraenzl. in Beibl. Bot. Jahrb. Syst. 117: 28 (1916)
