= Epidendrum subsect. Racemosa =

Scientific classification
- Kingdom: Plantae
- Clade: Tracheophytes
- Clade: Angiosperms
- Clade: Monocots
- Order: Asparagales
- Family: Orchidaceae
- Subfamily: Epidendroideae
- Genus: Epidendrum
- Subgenus: Epidendrum subg. Epidendrum
- Section: Epidendrum sect. Planifolia
- Subsection: Epidendrum subsect. Racemosa

Group of orchids

Epidendrum subsect. Racemosa is a subsection belonging to section E. sect. Planifolia of subgenus E. subg. Epidendrum within the orchid family Orchidaceae. Plants classified under Racemosa differ from other subsections of E. sect. Planifolia in their production of raceme-like inflorescences. In 1861, Reichenbach identified 26 species within this subsection. These names correspond to 25 species currently recognized in the World Checklist of Selected Plant Families (page numbers refer to Reichenbach 1861):

- E. acuminatum Ruiz & Pav.(1798) (p. 408)
- E. angustissimum Lindl. (1853) (p. 407)
- E. arbuscula Lindl. (1842) (p. 410)
- E. cardioglossum Rchb.f. (1850) (p. 407)
- E. cernuum Kunth (1816) (p. 409)
- E. chioneum Lindl. (1845) (p. 409)
- E. conopseum R.Br. (1813) (p. 408), syn. E. magnoliae Muhl. (1813)
- E. fimbriatum Kunth (1816) (p. 406)
- E. gastropodium Rchb.f. (1862)(p. 405)
- E. globiflorum F.Lelun & Kraenzl (1899) as E. coccineum Rchb.f.(1855) nom. illeg. (p. 405)
- E. incomptum Rchb.f. (1853) (p. 410)
- E. insectiferum Lindl. (1853) (p. 409)
- E. jamaicense Lindl. (1853) (p. 404-405)
- E. longipetalum A.Rich & Galeotti (1845) (p. 407)
- E. orgyale Lindl. (1845) (p. 406)
- E. philippii Rchb.f. (1850) (p. 405—406)
- E. propinquum A.Rich. & Galeotti (1845) (p. 405). also listed as E. ledifolium A.Rich. & Galeotti (1845) (p. 405) .
- E. quadrangulatum A.D.Hawkes (1957) as E. quadratum Lindl. (1853) nom. illeg. (p. 406)
- E. sarcostalix Rchb.f. & Warsz. (1854) (p. 406)
- E. steyermarkii A.D. Hawkes (1957) as E matutinum Rchb.f. (1850) nom. illeg. (p. 409)
- E. scabrum Ruiz & Pav. (1798) (p. 408)
- E. tenue Lindl. (1841) (p. 407)
- E. torquatum Lindl. (1845) (p. 408-409)
- E. vernixium Rchb.f. & Warsz. (1854) (pp. 407–408)
- E. veroscriptum Hágsater (1993) as E. scriptum A.Rich. & Galeotti (1845) nom. illeg. (p. 407)
