= Hálpata Tastanaki Preserve =

- Location within Florida
- Location: Marion County, Florida
- Nearest city: Dunnellon
- Coordinates: 29.0206°N 82.3616°W
- Area: 8,146 acres (32.97 km^{2})
- Governing body: Southwest Florida Water Management District
- Website: Hálpata Tastanaki Preserve

Hálpata Tastanaki Preserve is located in Marion County, Florida and is part of the Southwest Florida Water Management District. It is 8,146 acres (32.97 km^{2}) and located at 15430 SW CR 484 in Dunnellon. Various sports and recreation opportunities are offered by the park including hiking, fishing, biking, horseback riding and picnicking.

A variety of plant communities occur on the property, including floodplain swamp and oak scrub along the Withlacoochee River and longleaf pine turkey oak sandhills occurring in upland areas. Recovering stands of oak scrub scattered amid the sandhill support the threatened Florida scrub-jay.

In addition to natural resources, the property supported a rich historical past. The preserve is named after Seminole leader Hálpata Tastanaki (Chief Alligator) who, along with Osceola, Jumper, and approximately 1,000 warriors, took part in the largest battle of the Second Seminole War in 1836. Included within the property is the site of the community of Stockton, established shortly after the conclusion of the Second Seminole War.

Public ownership of the property provides for the long-term protection and enhancement of floodplain forests along the Withlacoochee River, isolated wetland systems and extensive upland areas with high rates of aquifer recharge.
