= Emeralda Marsh Conservation Area =

U.S. conservation area in Florida

- IUCN category Ib (wilderness area)
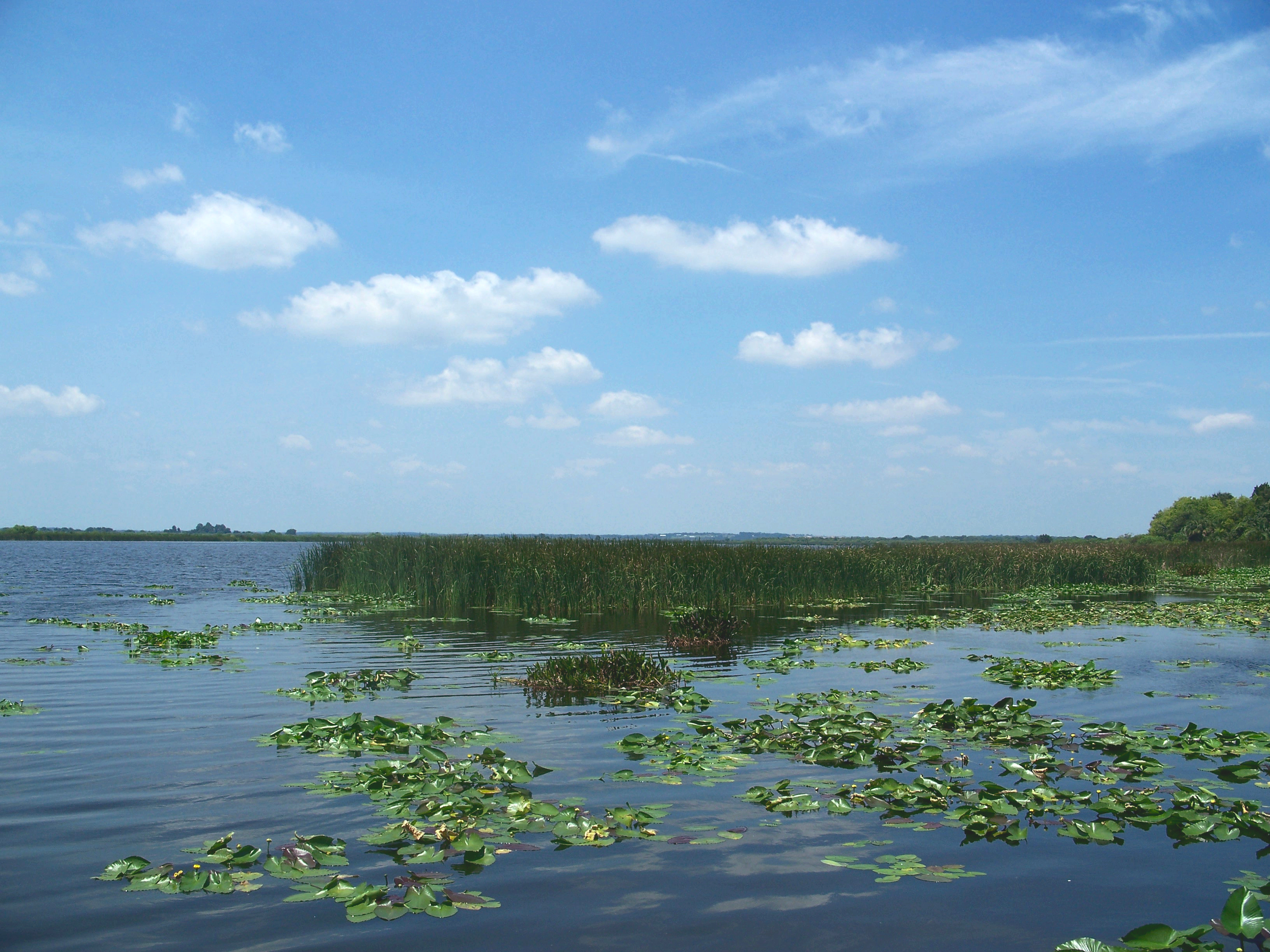
- Looking west from Emeralda Island Road

- Location within Florida
- Location: Lake / Marion counties, Florida, USA
- Nearest city: Lisbon, Florida
- Coordinates: 28°58′1.46″N 81°48′13.88″W
- Area: 7,089 acres (2,869 ha)
- Established: 1974
- Governing body: Florida Department of Environmental Protection

U.S. National Natural Landmark
- Designated: December 1974

The Emeralda Marsh Conservation Area (EMCA) is a 7,089-acre (28.69 km^{2}) U.S. conservation area administered by the St. Johns River Water Management District in Florida. It is to the east of the Lake Griffin State Park, and covers parts of Lake and Marion counties. In December 1974, it was designated a National Natural Landmark.

It is one of the sites along the Great Florida Birding Trail.
