= Deep Creek Preserve =

Coordinates: 27.0473°N 82.0099°W

Deep Creek Preserve is located in DeSoto County. The 2,000-acre (8.1 km^{2}) area serves as a water conservation resource and offers opportunities for a range of activities. It is located at 10797 SW Peace River Street in Arcadia. It is part of the Southwest Florida Water Management District.

Habitats include pine flatwoods, freshwater marsh, and wet prairie. There are also ridges of oak scrub and scrubby flatwoods.
