= Julington-Durbin Preserve =

Nature preserve in Florida

Coordinates: 30.125°N 81.554°W

The Julington-Durbin Preserve is a 2,031-acre nature preserve operated by the St. Johns River Water Management District in Duval County, Florida. The preserve shares the name of the two creeks that border the preserve and connect to the St. Johns River. Julington Creek is on the north side of the preserve, and Durbin Creek is to the south. The preserve has three designated hiking trails. Recreational activities include picnicking, horseback riding, bicycling, and hiking.
