= Cliff Stephens Park =

Park in Pinellas County, Florida, US

- Location within Florida
- Location: Clearwater, Florida
- Coordinates: 27.97344°N 82.72141°W
- Area: 44 acres (180,000 m^{2})
- Established: 1980
- Governing body: Southwest Florida Water Management District
- Website: www.swfwmd.state.fl.us/recreation/areas/cliffstephens.html

Cliff Stephens Park is in Pinellas County, Florida. It is managed as part of the Southwest Florida Water Management District. Located at 600 Fairwood Avenue in Clearwater, Florida, it is 44 acres (180,000 m^{2}) in size. The park provides for stormwater and flood management, and includes trails for bicycling, hiking and inline skating, as well as opportunities for boating, fishing, frisbee golf, a 19 station exercise course, and picnic area.

== Climate ==
The average temperature is 22 °C. The warmest month is May, at 26 °C, and the coldest is January, at 15 °C. The average rainfall is 1,615 mm per year. The wettest month is June, with 316 mm of rain, and the driest is December, with 45 mm.
