= Price's Scrub State Park =

State park in Florida, United States

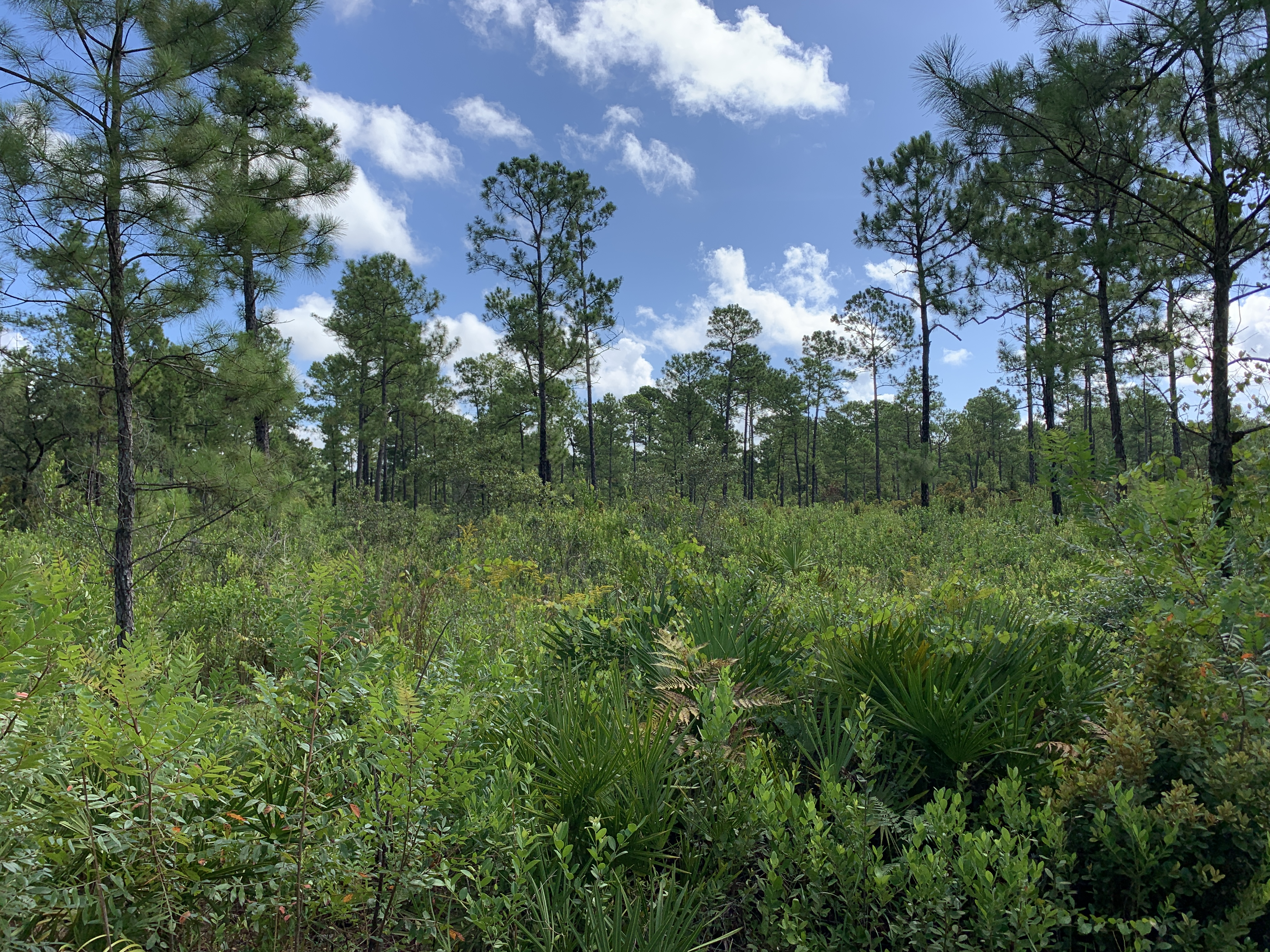
- Pine flatwoods at Price's Scrub State Park

- Location within Florida Location within the United States
- Interactive map of Price's Scrub State Park
- Location: Marion County, Florida, US
- Nearest city: Micanopy
- Coordinates: 29°27′49″N 82°16′40″W
- Area: 962 acres (3.89 km^{2})
- Governing body: Florida Department of Environmental Protection

Price’s Scrub State Park is a 962-acre Florida state park located in Marion County, Florida. The park has relatively high biodiversity with several natural communities, including its scrub, and is important in the proposed regional connection of conservation lands. The park is a part of the proposed Northwest Marion Greenway. This corridor would connect Paynes Prairie Preserve State Park to Goethe State Forest and could be used for recreational activities, particularly horseback riding.

== Location ==
The park is along Interstate 75. Micanopy is one mile north, Ocala is 21 miles (34 km) southeast, and Gainesville is 12 miles north, approximately. Although it is located in Marion County, the park is contiguous with and south of Alachua County.

== History ==
The park lands were acquired by the state in 2002. The purchase contract was negotiated for $1.97 million. The purchasing funds came from the Greenways and Trails Florida Forever program. The Department of Environmental Protection's Office of Greenways and Trails manages the land under a lease that expires after 50 years, in May 2053.

== Activities ==
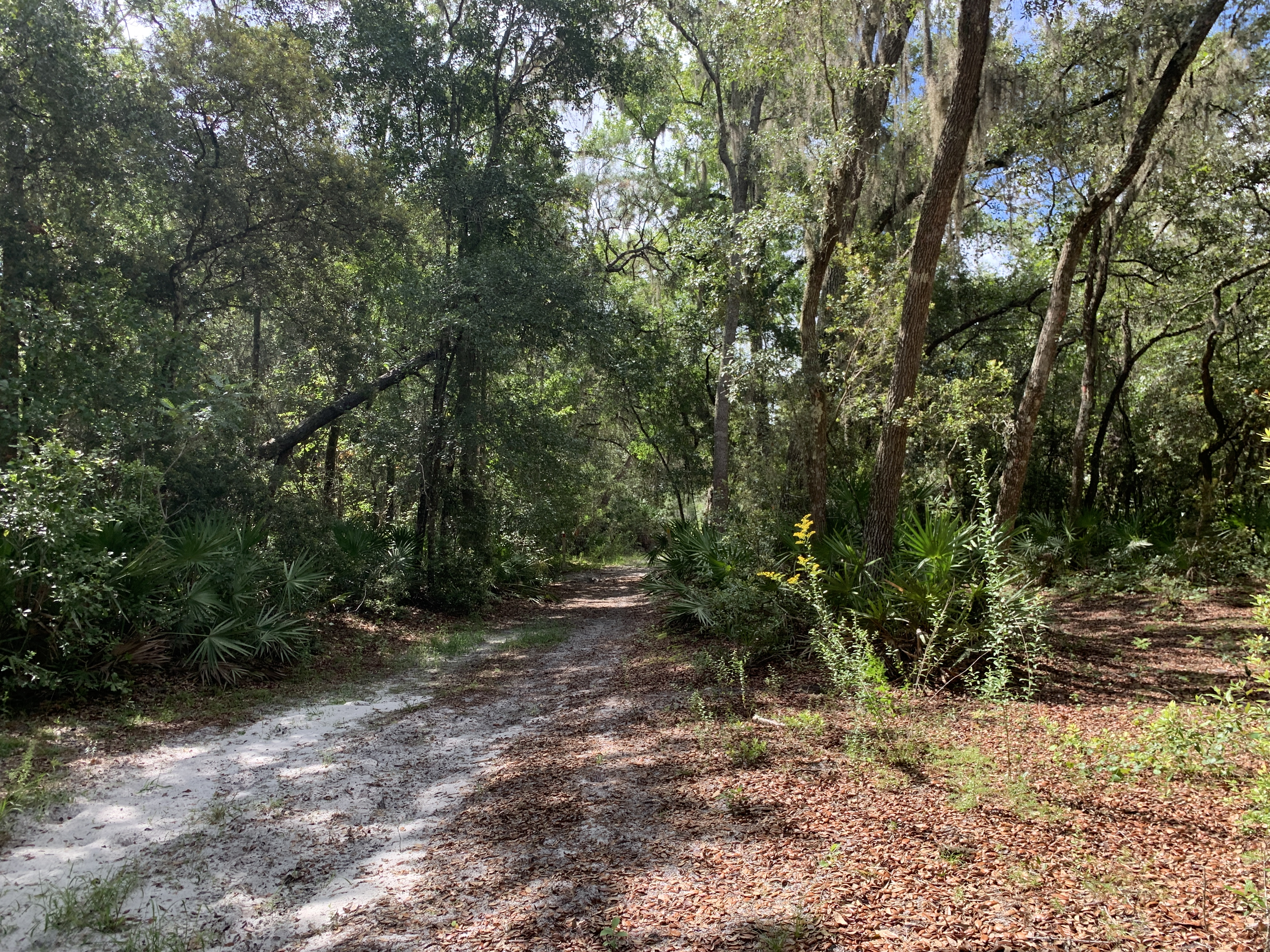
Trail in the park

The park has a 9.5-mile trail network. The trails in the north are more shaded with rolling hills, and the trails in the south are more sandy and open. Possible activities include horseback riding, hiking, birdwatching and cycling. Bicycling may be difficult in the sandy areas. Amenities include a grassy parking lot, picnic tables, portable toilets, and a watering trough for horses.

== Ecology ==
The ecosystems are diverse, containing at least fifteen natural communities including upland mixed forests, depression marshes, scrubs, scrubby flatwoods, wet flatwoods and sinkhole lakes. In the northern part of the park, there is a moderately large sinkhole lake, called Water Lily Pond.

There are canopies of sand pines and pond pines and understory of saw palmetto, fetterbush, gallberries, broom sedge, and saltbush among other flora. Almost 70 species of birds have reported at the park.

== Archaeological significance ==
The park contains part of a stagecoach route that went from Ocala to Micanopy in the 19th century. It also contains prehistoric archaeological sites.

== See also ==
- List of Florida state parks
