= Deep Creek State Forest =

State forest in Florida, United States

Coordinates: 30.056°N 81.374°W

- Location: St. Johns County, Florida
- Nearest city: St. Augustine, Florida
- Area: 380 acres (150 ha)

Deep Creek State Forest (DCSF) is a 380-acre state forest 11 miles north of St. Augustine, Florida in St. Johns County, Florida. Deep Creek State Forest is located on both sides of Deep Creek, for which it is named. The state forest is west of the Guana River Wildlife Management Area across the Intracoastal Waterway (Tolomato River).

== See also ==
- Deep Creek Conservation Area
- List of Florida state forests
