= Deep Creek Conservation Area =

Coordinates: 29.758°N 81.507°W

Deep Creek Conservation Area is an area of protected lands near Hastings, Florida in St. Johns County and Putnam County that is managed by the St. Johns River Water Management District.

The park covers 5,374 acres and includes entrances at its north tract and a west tract. The area is on the east side of the St. Johns River off State Road 207. It is mostly floodplain swamp and also includes pine flatwoods. Wildlife in the area include deer, turkey, wading birds, and marsh birds. The area offers hiking, biking and paddlecraft opportunities, but does not have a boat launch.

== See also ==
- List of Florida state parks
- Deep Creek State Forest
- List of Florida state forests
