= Peace River Manasota Regional Water Supply Authority =

Regional utility in Florida, United States

The Peace River Manasota Regional Water Supply Authority is a regional utility that draws water from the Peace River and supplies it to member governments across Southwest Florida. The authority has operated the regional water system since 1991, serving over 900,000 people with about 26 million gallons of water per day.

The authority's members include Sarasota, Charlotte, Manatee and DeSoto counties. Manatee County has been a member of the authority since its founding in 1982. Sarasota, DeSoto, and Charlotte counties have a combined daily draw totaling close to 30 million gallons from the authority.

The authority's main reservoir facility is stationed near the city of North Port, with a capacity of approximately 6 billion gallons of water.

== See also ==
- Southwest Florida Water Management District
