= McGregor Smith Scout Reservation =

Coordinates: 28.8458°N 82.2246°W

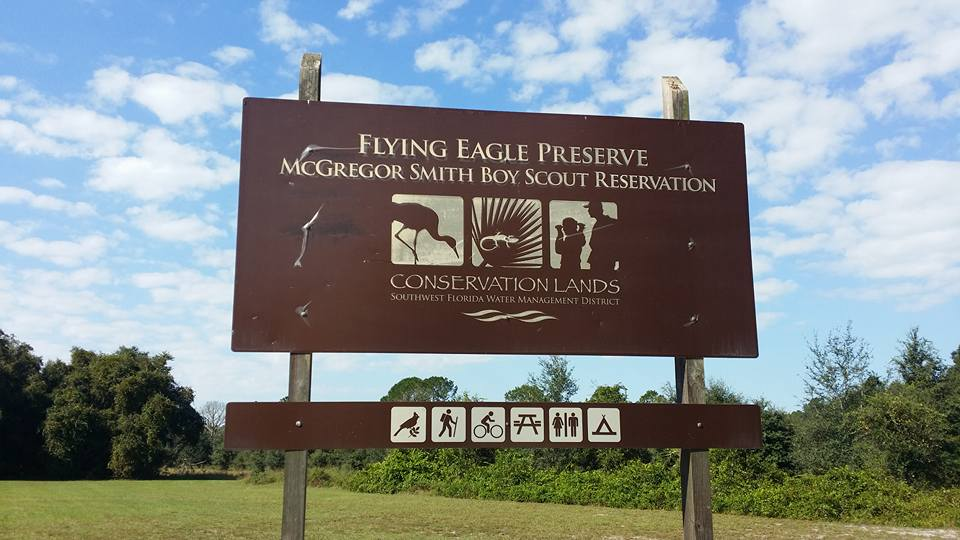
Flying Eagle Preserve - McGregor Smith Scout Reservation

The McGregor Smith Scout Reservation is located in Inverness, Citrus County, Florida, US and managed as part of the Southwest Florida Water Management District. The 4,964-acre (20.09 km^{2}) area was purchased from the Boy Scouts in 2004 and is located at 12650 East Boy Scout Road in Inverness.

In 2012, the camp was closed and completely dismantled.
