= Cypress Creek Preserve =

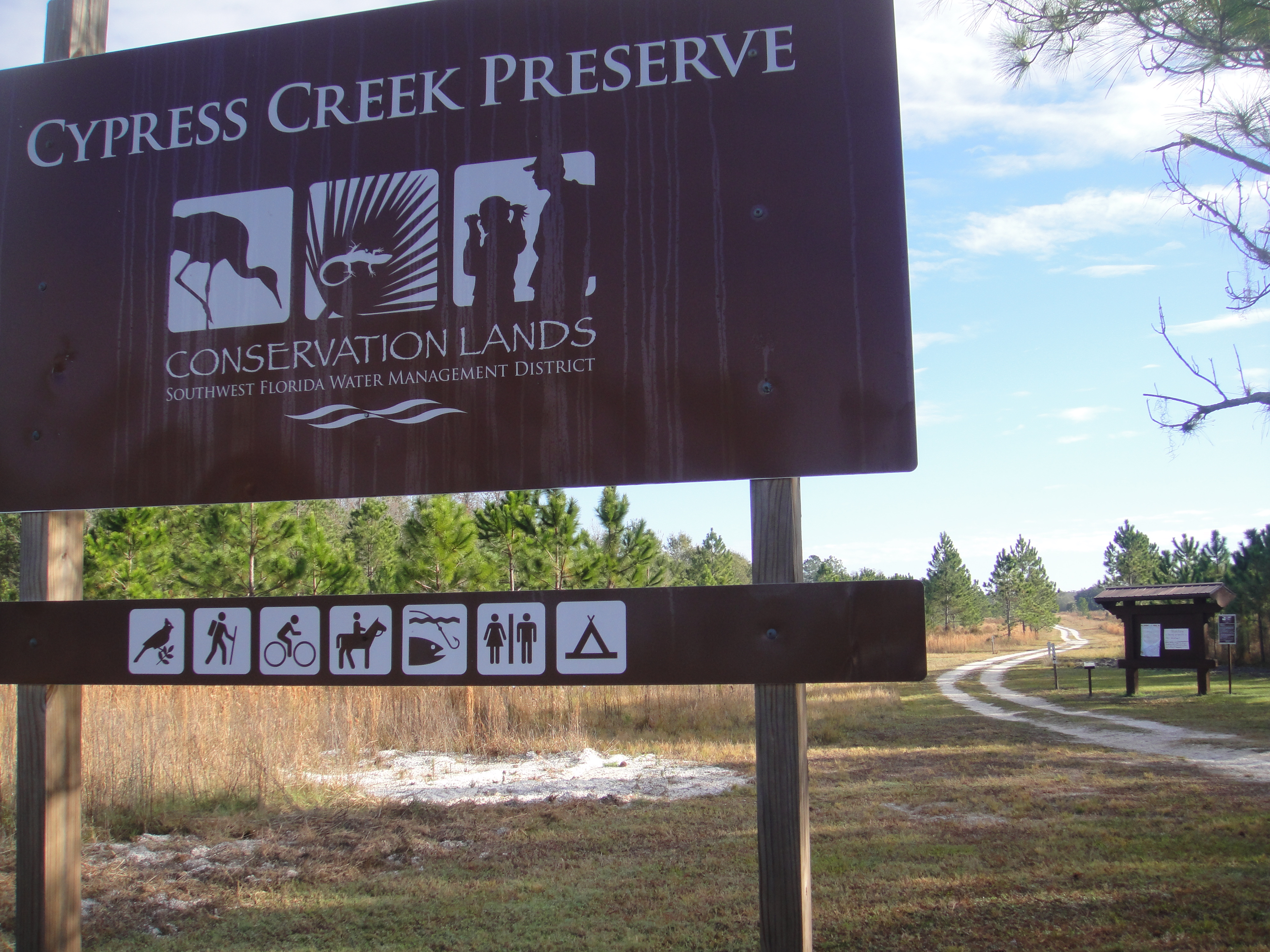
Cypress Creek Preserve Parkway Boulevard entrance

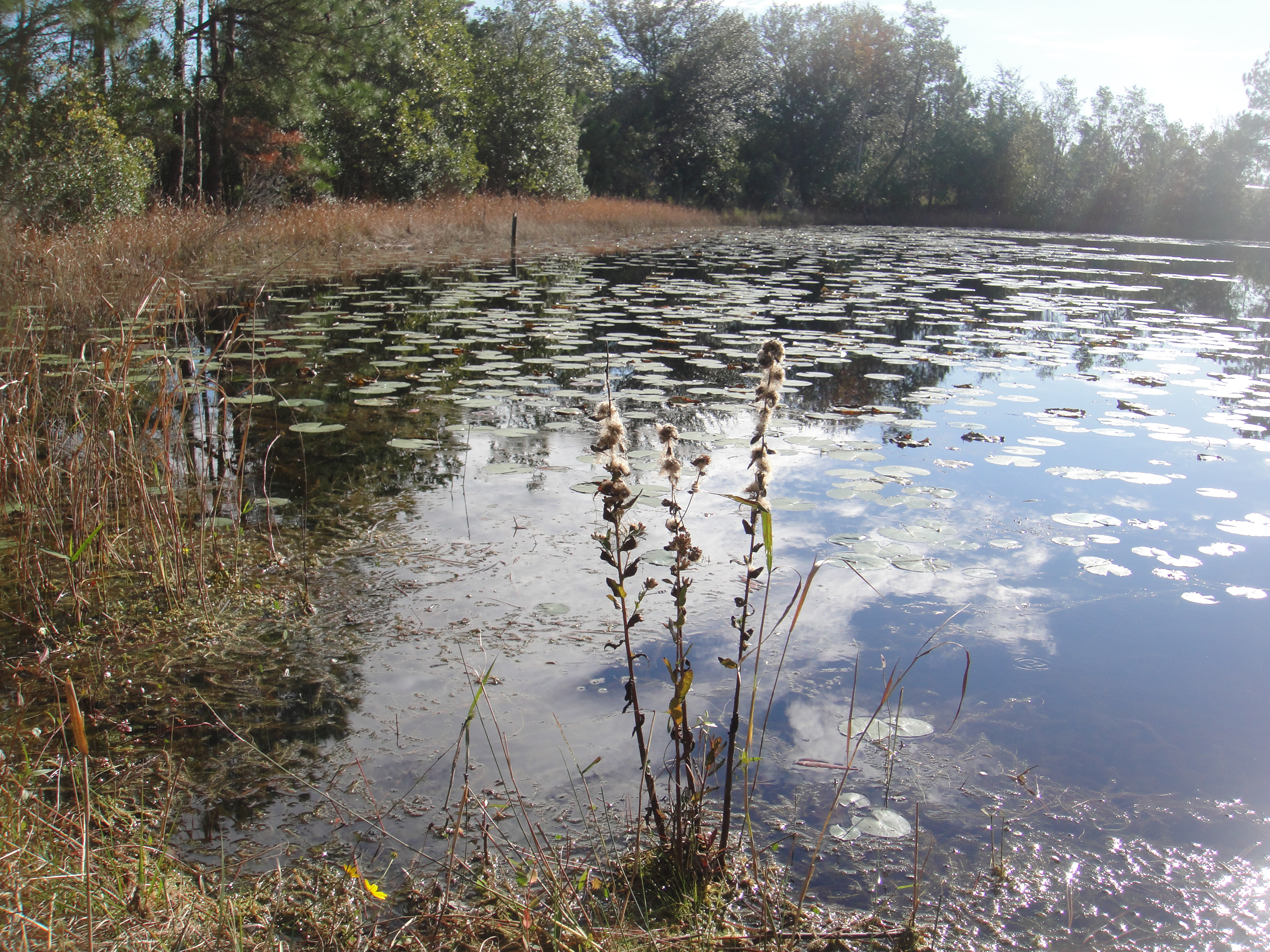
A pond near the Parkway Boulevard entrance

Cypress Creek Preserve is a 7,400 acre (3,000 ha) park in Pasco County, Florida at 8720 Pump Station Road in Land o' Lakes, Florida. According to the Southwest Florida Water Management District (SWFWMD) the land was purchased to provide flood protection and as a public water supply. The park includes several trails covering 12 miles (19 km). Habitats include cypress and hardwood forests as well as slash pine, longleaf pine and palmetto in Florida flatwoods. Cypress Creek, a tributary of the Hillsborough River runs through the property. Butterflies, woodpeckers, wild pigs, deer, pygmy rattle snakes, armadillos, gopher tortoises, and several species of bird reside in the park, including Florida Scrub Jay. It is surrounded by a road and grazing lands in an area rapidly populating with suburban housing developments. The park can be accessed along Parkway Boulevard.

Recreational opportunities in the preserve include off-road bicycling and horseback riding. There are sites for equestrian and group camping as well as primitive camping. There are also picnic tables and fire rings/ grills. A free reservation is required for camp sites and must be displayed on vehicle dashboards.

Cypress Creek Preserve is open from sunrise until sunset. It is on the same road as Pine View Middle School. The west gate is at the west end of Pump Station Road, and is accessed from Ehren Cutoff (CR 583), midway between SR 52 and US 41 by following the signs to Cypress Creek Well Field. Due to private land holdings, there is no public access beyond TBW (Tampa Bay Water) to railroad tracks.
