= Inverness, Florida =

City in Florida, United States

- City
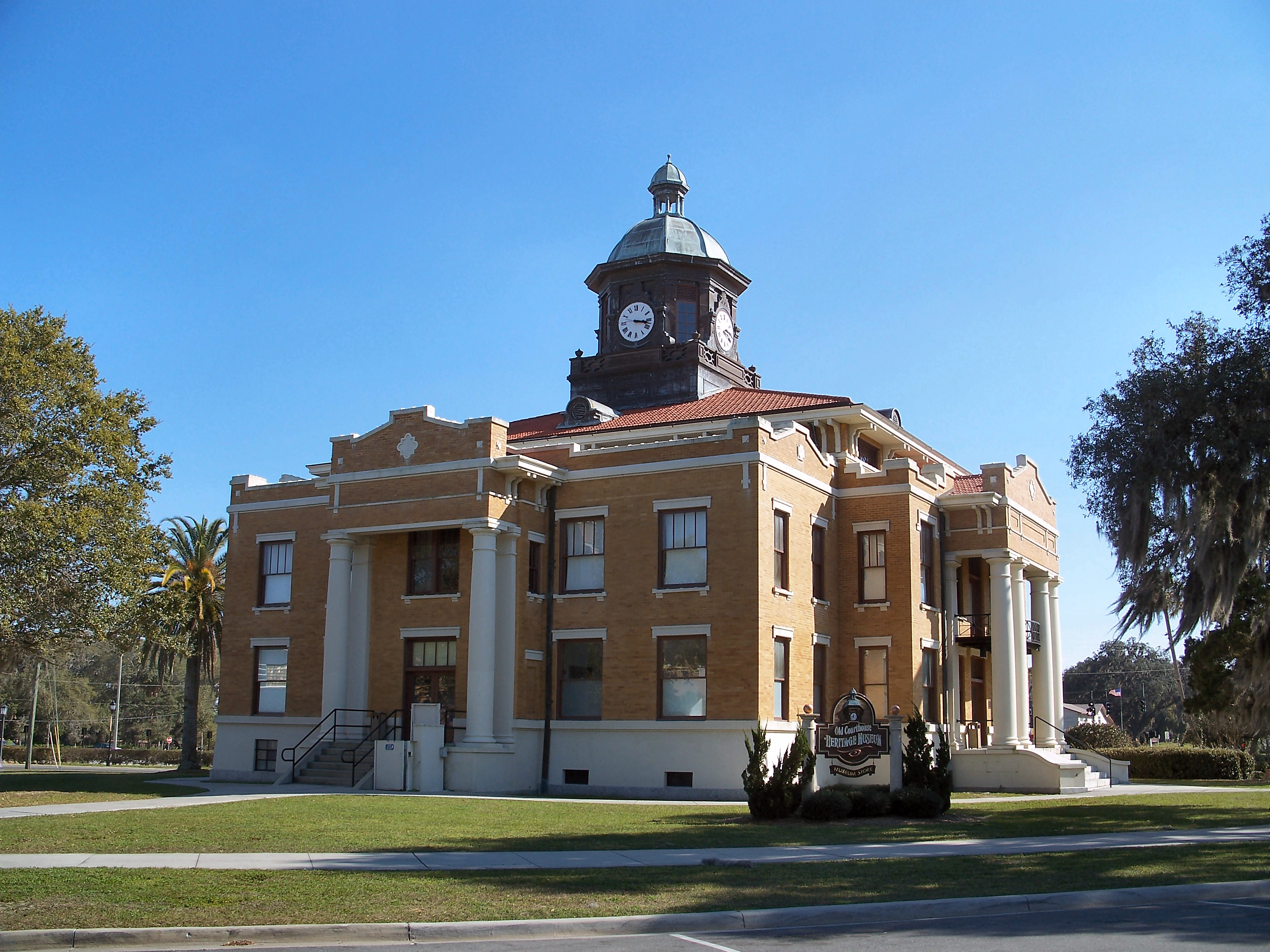
- Old Citrus County Courthouse

- Seal
- Nickname: "Small Town Done Right"
- Location in Citrus County and the state of Florida
- Coordinates: 28°50′30″N 82°20′31″W
- Country: United States
- State: Florida
- County: Citrus
- Incorporated: March 6, 1919

Government
  - Type: Council–Manager

Area
  - Total: 8.69 sq mi (22.51 km^{2})
  - Land: 8.33 sq mi (21.58 km^{2})
  - Water: 0.36 sq mi (0.94 km^{2})
- Elevation: 66 ft (20 m)

Population (2020)
  - Total: 7,543
  - Density: 905.4/sq mi (349.59/km^{2})
- Time zone: UTC-5 (Eastern (EST))
  - Summer (DST): UTC-4 (EDT)
- ZIP codes: 34450, 34451, 34452, 34453
- Area code: 352
- FIPS code: 12-33950
- GNIS feature ID: 2404763
- Website: inverness.gov

Inverness is a city and the county seat of Citrus County, Florida, United States. It is near the 10,950-acre (4,430 ha) Flying Eagle Preserve. As of the 2020 census, the population was 7,543, up from 7,210 at the 2010 census. It is part of the Homosassa Springs, Florida Metropolitan Statistical Area.

== History ==
Archaeological digs showed that the Seminole resided in the area that is now Inverness. The Seminole leader Osceola made his wartime camp, known as Powell's Town, in the area during the Second Seminole War. During the Second Seminole War, the nearby Fort Cooper was besieged by Osceola and his band of warriors. The garrison was just about out of food when it was relieved by a column of troops under Gen. Duncan L. Clinch.

The city of Inverness was originally named "Tompkinsville". A white settlement of the area dates back to 1868. Tompkins, later known as "Uncle Alf", started the community. To attract newcomers to the town, he established a mail service and helped erect the first sawmill in the county. He gave his brother-in-law, Frank M. Dampier Sr., a lot to build a store, with Dampier becoming the first merchant in town. Dampier is credited with laying out the town and naming it Tompkinsville.

Not many years later, the town of Tompkinsville was sold to a firm in Jacksonville, and the name was changed to "Inverness". According to the late historian Mary McRae of Homosassa, Inverness is named directly after a Scottish city of the same name. Inverness is Great Britain's most northerly city, and "the capital of the Highlands", with a population of 46,870. The story goes that Inverness, Florida, got its name from a lonely Scotsman, far away from his home, who gazed upon the blue waters of the Native American-named Tsala Apopka Lake and thought the area looked like the headlands and lochs of the area surrounding Inverness, Scotland. Inver is a Gaelic word meaning "mouth of the river". The River Ness flows through the Scottish city Inverness, so Inverness literally means the mouth of the River Ness, which flows from Loch Ness. Since the Florida city lies at the foot of one of the chain of lakes in Citrus County, Inverness seemed an appropriate name.

According to official city documentation, Inverness was incorporated on March 6, 1919.

Over twelve downtown buildings have been recognized by the historic plaque program and are presently active places for business. Central Business Development grants have helped to retain the historic character of the city. In 1961, the historic courthouse downtown was used to film the courtroom scene of "Follow That Dream", featuring Elvis Presley.

The city has been designated a "Gateway Community" by the Florida Trail Association. Since 1995, Inverness has been recognized as a Tree City USA by the National Arbor Day Foundation and the US Forest Service. In 2009, Inverness was named "City of the Year" by the Forty and Eight, a national veterans' organization.

== Geography ==
Inverness is located in eastern Citrus County, on the western shore of the connected Tsala Apopka and Henderson lakes. According to the United States Census Bureau, the city has a total area of 7.7 square miles (19.9 km^{2}), of which 7.6 square miles (19.7 km^{2}) is land and 0.08 square miles (0.2 km^{2}), or 1.01%, is water. Within the city are 330 acres (130 ha) of land reserved for passive and active park usage.

=== Climate ===
Inverness has a humid subtropical climate (Cfa), typical of the southeastern United States, with hot, humid summers and mild, mainly dry winters.

Climate data for Inverness, Florida, 1991–2020 normals, extremes 1899–present
Month	Jan	Feb	Mar	Apr	May	Jun	Jul	Aug	Sep	Oct	Nov	Dec	Year
Record high °F (°C)	92 (33)	95 (35)	96 (36)	97 (36)	101 (38)	102 (39)	102 (39)	101 (38)	105 (41)	97 (36)	93 (34)	90 (32)	105 (41)
Mean maximum °F (°C)	82.6 (28.1)	84.6 (29.2)	87.6 (30.9)	91.1 (32.8)	95.8 (35.4)	97.3 (36.3)	97.3 (36.3)	96.7 (35.9)	94.8 (34.9)	91.5 (33.1)	87.6 (30.9)	83.9 (28.8)	98.7 (37.1)
Mean daily maximum °F (°C)	69.3 (20.7)	72.3 (22.4)	76.8 (24.9)	82.0 (27.8)	87.9 (31.1)	90.1 (32.3)	90.6 (32.6)	90.4 (32.4)	88.8 (31.6)	83.7 (28.7)	76.9 (24.9)	72.4 (22.4)	81.8 (27.7)
Daily mean °F (°C)	56.0 (13.3)	58.9 (14.9)	63.1 (17.3)	68.5 (20.3)	74.8 (23.8)	79.7 (26.5)	80.7 (27.1)	80.7 (27.1)	78.9 (26.1)	72.4 (22.4)	64.3 (17.9)	59.0 (15.0)	69.8 (21.0)
Mean daily minimum °F (°C)	42.6 (5.9)	45.6 (7.6)	49.4 (9.7)	54.9 (12.7)	61.8 (16.6)	69.2 (20.7)	70.9 (21.6)	71.1 (21.7)	69.0 (20.6)	61.2 (16.2)	51.7 (10.9)	45.7 (7.6)	57.7 (14.3)
Mean minimum °F (°C)	25.4 (−3.7)	27.8 (−2.3)	32.6 (0.3)	40.3 (4.6)	50.8 (10.4)	63.2 (17.3)	67.4 (19.7)	67.7 (19.8)	61.7 (16.5)	45.1 (7.3)	34.8 (1.6)	29.5 (−1.4)	23.2 (−4.9)
Record low °F (°C)	15 (−9)	17 (−8)	24 (−4)	30 (−1)	42 (6)	52 (11)	61 (16)	61 (16)	50 (10)	31 (−1)	22 (−6)	15 (−9)	15 (−9)
Average precipitation inches (mm)	2.97 (75)	2.69 (68)	3.29 (84)	2.69 (68)	3.09 (78)	8.13 (207)	7.80 (198)	8.69 (221)	5.81 (148)	2.92 (74)	1.83 (46)	2.48 (63)	52.39 (1,331)
Average precipitation days (≥ 0.01 in)	7.0	7.0	6.4	5.8	5.9	13.9	16.7	16.8	12.8	7.5	5.9	6.2	111.9
Source: NOAA

== Demographics ==
Historical population
Census	Pop.	Note	%±
1920	1,132		—
1930	1,215		7.3%
1940	1,075		−11.5%
1950	1,471		36.8%
1960	1,878		27.7%
1970	2,299		22.4%
1980	4,095		78.1%
1990	5,797		41.6%
2000	6,789		17.1%
2010	7,210		6.2%
2020	7,543		4.6%
U.S. Decennial Census

=== Racial and ethnic composition ===
Inverness racial composition (Hispanics excluded from racial categories) (NH = Non-Hispanic)
Race	Pop 2010	Pop 2020	% 2010	% 2020
White (NH)	6,038	6,072	83.74%	80.50%
Black or African American (NH)	406	318	5.63%	4.22%
Native American or Alaska Native (NH)	25	24	0.35%	0.32%
Asian (NH)	121	159	1.68%	2.11%
Pacific Islander or Native Hawaiian (NH)	6	2	0.08%	0.03%
Some other race (NH)	19	35	0.26%	0.46%
Two or more races/Multiracial (NH)	128	273	1.78%	3.62%
Hispanic or Latino (any race)	467	660	6.48%	8.75%
Total	7,210	7,543		

=== 2020 census ===
As of the 2020 census, Inverness had a population of 7,543. The median age was 55.3 years. 15.8% of residents were under the age of 18 and 35.9% of residents were 65 years of age or older. For every 100 females there were 82.5 males, and for every 100 females age 18 and over there were 78.3 males age 18 and over.

94.3% of residents lived in urban areas, while 5.7% lived in rural areas.

There were 3,526 households in Inverness, of which 20.4% had children under the age of 18 living in them. Of all households, 32.6% were married-couple households, 20.0% were households with a male householder and no spouse or partner present, and 40.4% were households with a female householder and no spouse or partner present. About 42.3% of all households were made up of individuals and 26.8% had someone living alone who was 65 years of age or older.

There were 4,086 housing units, of which 13.7% were vacant. The homeowner vacancy rate was 3.1% and the rental vacancy rate was 8.8%.

=== Demographic estimates ===
In 2020, there were 1.92 persons per household. 83.6% of people lived in the same house as one year prior, and 3.8% of the population age 5 years and older spoke a language other than English at home.

In 2020, there were 1,657 families in the city. In 2020, 86.0% of households had a computer and 81.3% of households had a broadband internet subscription. Among the population age 25 and older, 90.9% were high school graduates or higher and 15.1% had a bachelor's degree or higher. Of the population under age 65, 11.0% lived with a disability and 13.5% were uninsured.

=== Income and poverty ===
In 2020, the median value of owner-occupied housing units was $120,100. The median selected monthly owner costs with a mortgage was $882 and the median selected monthly owner costs without a mortgage was $324. The median gross rent was $842. The median household income was $39,532 and the per capita income was $24,585. 15.8% of the population lived below the poverty threshold.

=== 2010 census ===
As of the 2010 United States census, there were 7,210 people, 3,361 households, and 1,777 families residing in the city.

== Transportation and recreation ==
Florida State Road 589 has an exit for Inverness.

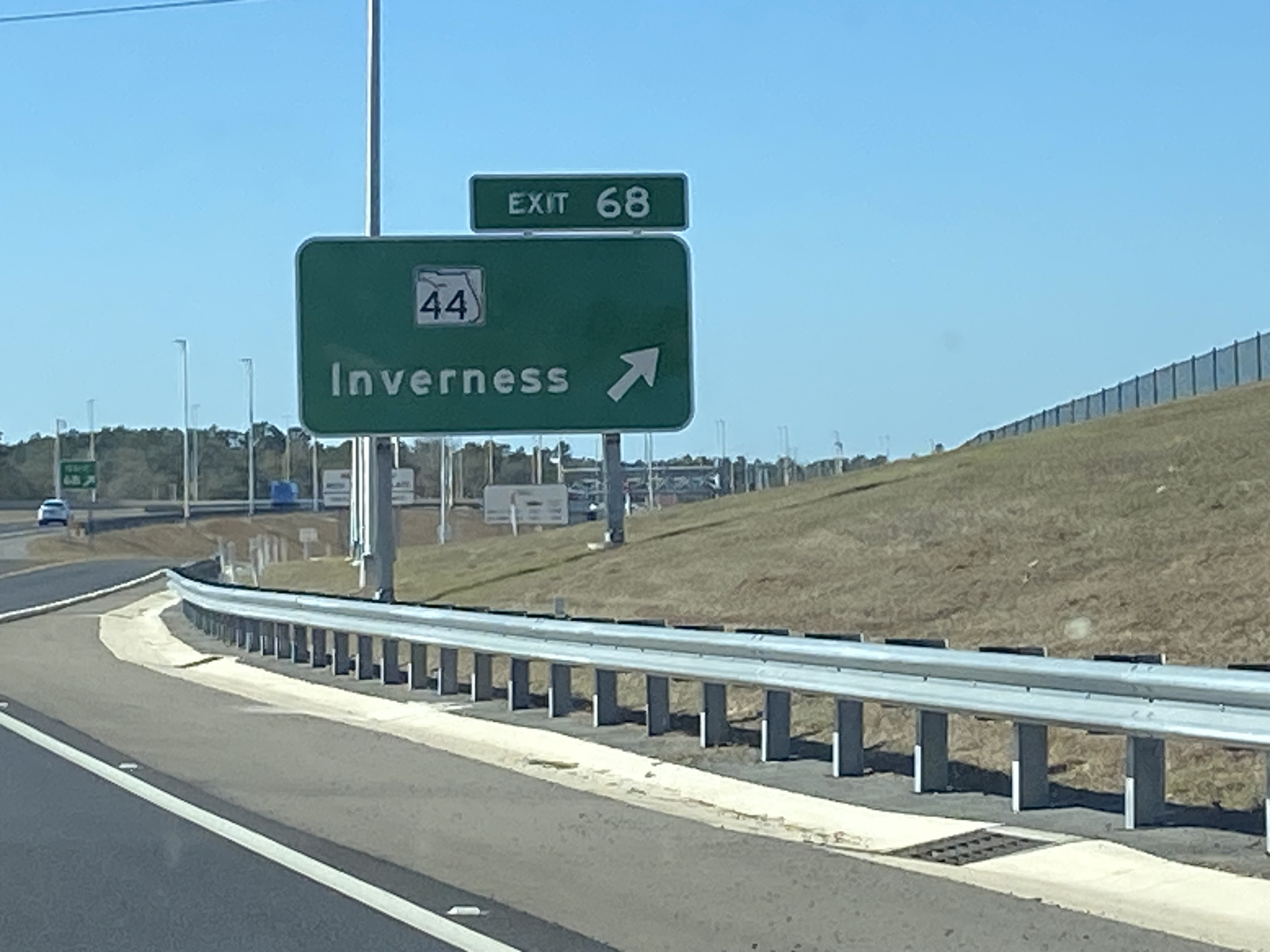
Exit sign on Florida State Road 589 for Inverness and Florida State Road 44

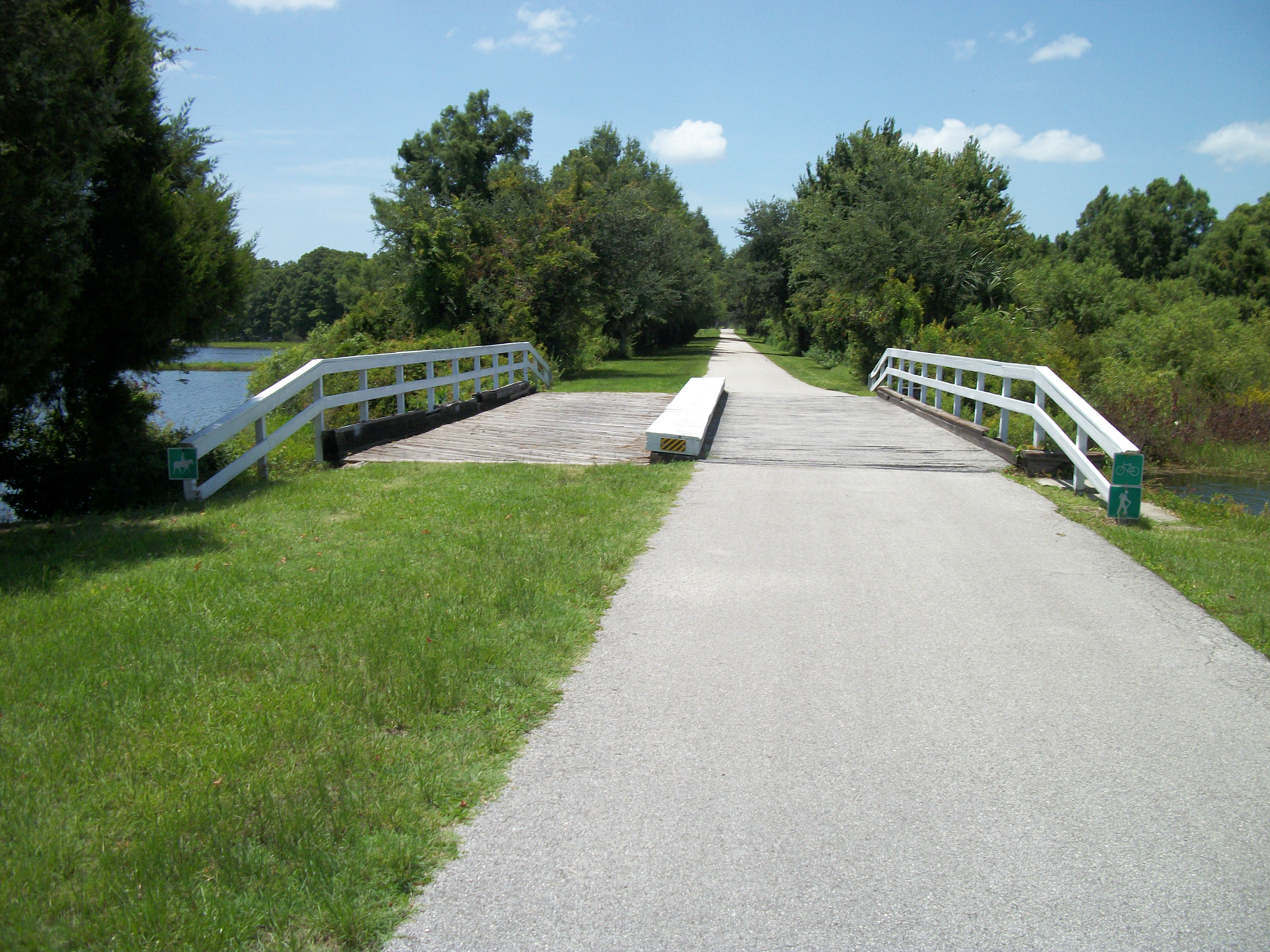
The Withlacoochee State Trail crosses an old railroad bridge over part of Henderson Lake.

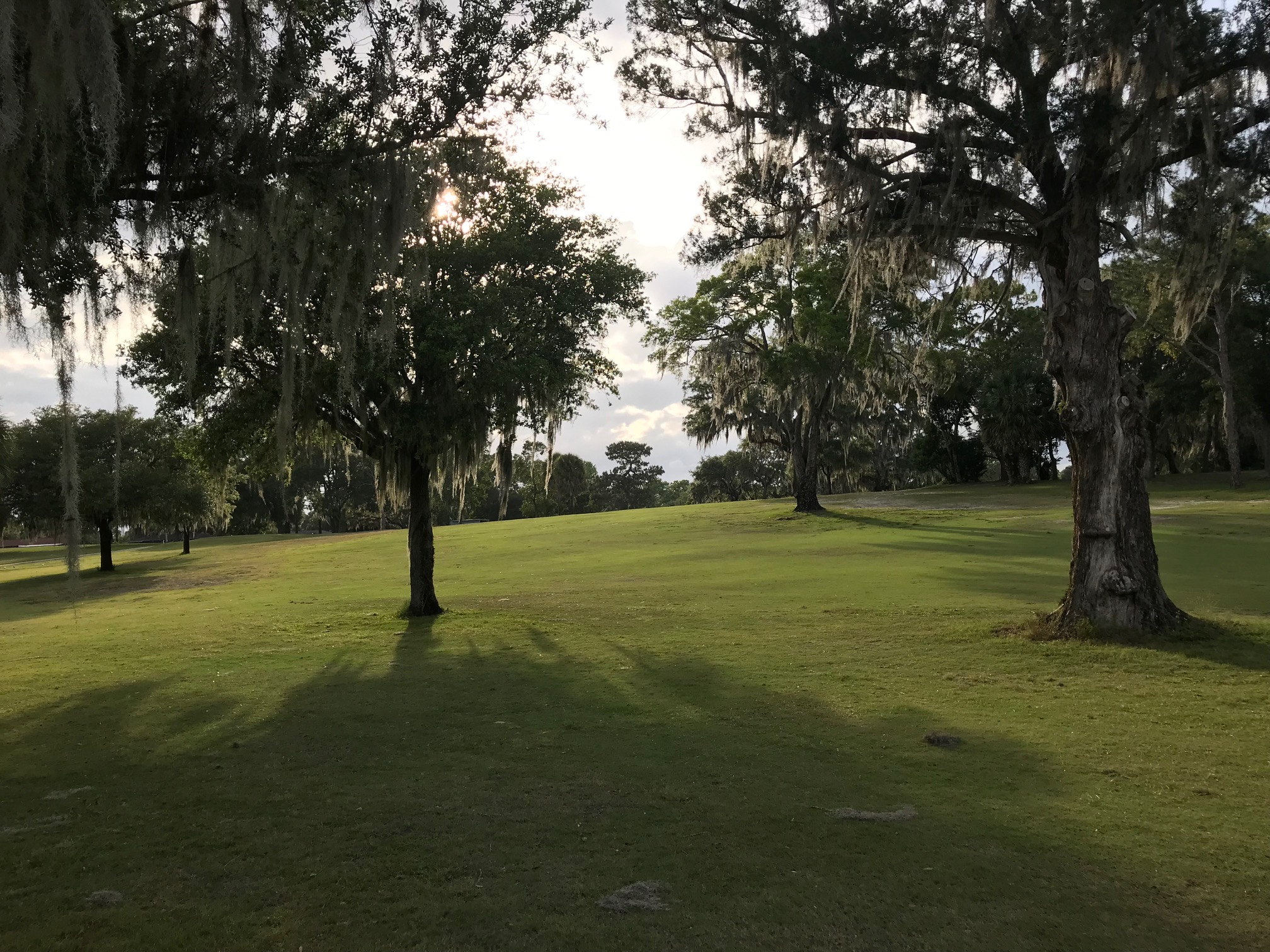
Inverness Golf and Country Club

The Inverness Airport is located 1 mile (1.6 km) south of the city limits, next to the Citrus County Speedway. The Citrus County Sheriff's Office's aviation unit operates from this airport.

U.S. Route 41 is the main north-south road through Inverness, leading north 17 miles (27 km) to Dunnellon and south 21 miles (34 km) to Brooksville. The main east-west road is State Road 44, leading west 17 miles (27 km) to Crystal River and east 15 miles (24 km) to Interstate 75 near Wildwood. The two roads join to form Inverness' Main Street from Talmage Avenue to Highland Boulevard. Other county roads include County Road 581 and County Road 470.

Inverness is home to the Lakes Region Library, which is part of the Citrus County Library System. The library offers several recreational classes such as Tai Chi, painting, gardening, basic technology usage, children and teen programs, and more.

The Withlacoochee State Trail, which replaced a former Atlantic Coast Line Railroad line, runs between two of the chained lakes, with small bridges replacing former railroad trestle crossings. The trail offers access to 46 continuous miles of enjoyment for biking, jogging and walking. It is the longest paved recreation trail in Florida. The Inverness trailhead can be found on North Apopka Avenue (CR 470) across from the trail crossing and Liberty Park.

The Inverness Golf and Country Club in Inverness was designed by Bill Campbell in the 1960s.

Other parks in Inverness include Wallace Brooks Park, Whispering Pines Park, the Henderson Lake boat ramps, and Fort Cooper State Park, just south of the city. Inverness is also close to Withlapopka Community Park, the almost 11,000-acre (4,500 ha) Flying Eagle Preserve and the almost 5,000-acre (2,000 ha) McGregor Smith Scout Reservation.

There is a racetrack in Inverness called the Citrus County Speedway.

== Government ==
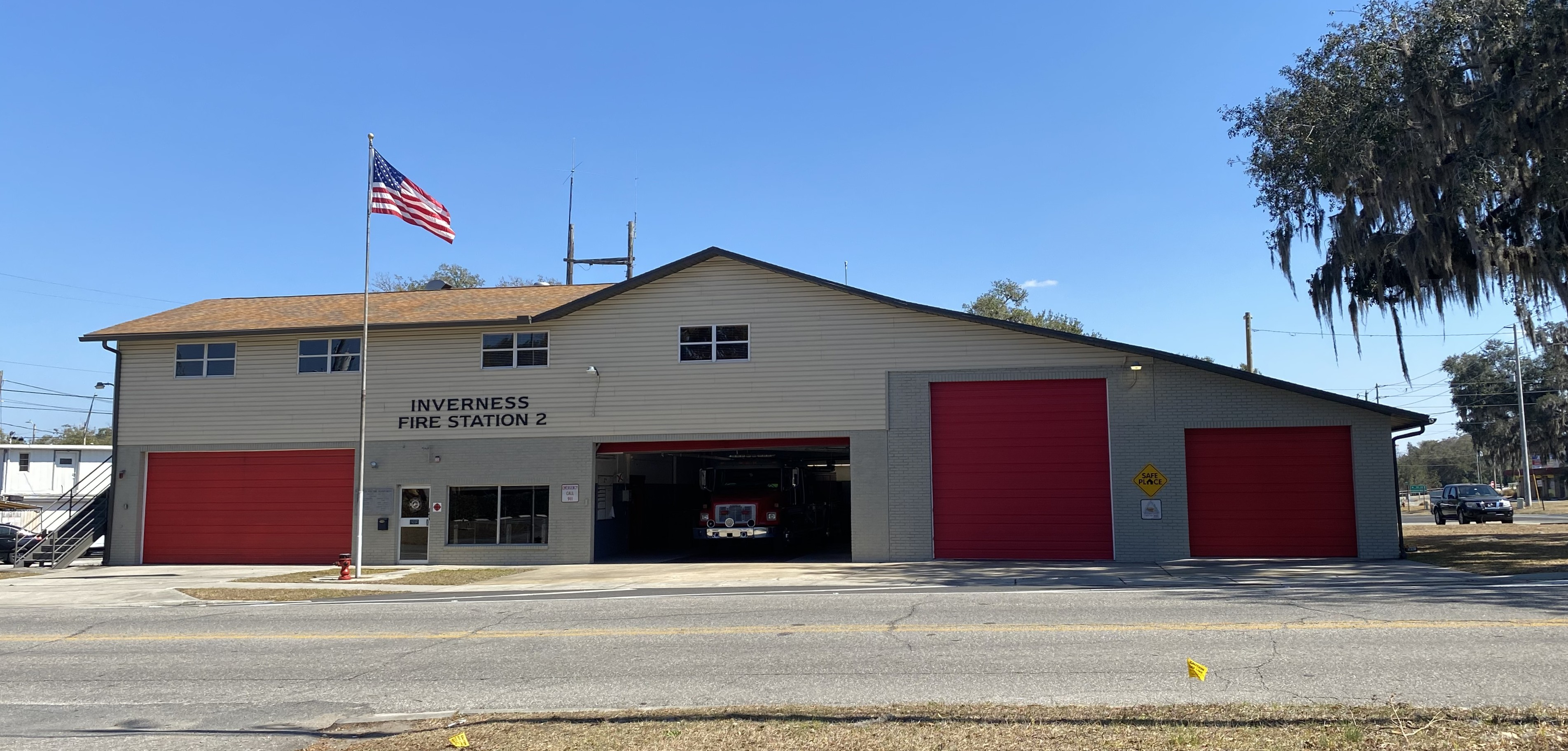
Inverness Fire Station 2 in Downtown Inverness

Inverness utilizes a council–manager form of government with a city council composed of the mayor of Inverness and five councilmembers. This council also sets policy to be administered, directed, and implemented by the city manager. As of February 2020, the current mayor is Bob Plaisted and the current city manager is Eric Williams.

== Education ==
The city is served by Citrus County Schools. Residents are divided between Inverness Primary, Pleasant Grove Elementary, and Hernando Elementary. All residents are zoned to Inverness Middle School, and Citrus High School.

The Lakes Region Library of Citrus Libraries is in Inverness.

== Events ==
The last full weekend in October is reserved for the Great American Cooter Festival, named after the Florida cooter turtle. A family-focused event of music, games, crafts and more is held at the adjoining Liberty and Wallace Brooks parks on Lake Henderson. In 2022, the event was replaced by the Inverness Country Jam.

Since 1971, the first weekend in November marks the Festival of the Arts, a juried fine art show that has grown to include over 100 artists.

Every year in March, there is a Seminole War re-enactment at Fort Cooper State Park called Fort Cooper Days.

A Veteran's Day Parade is held every year in Inverness.
