= Tsala Apopka Lake =

Chain of lakes in Central Florida, US

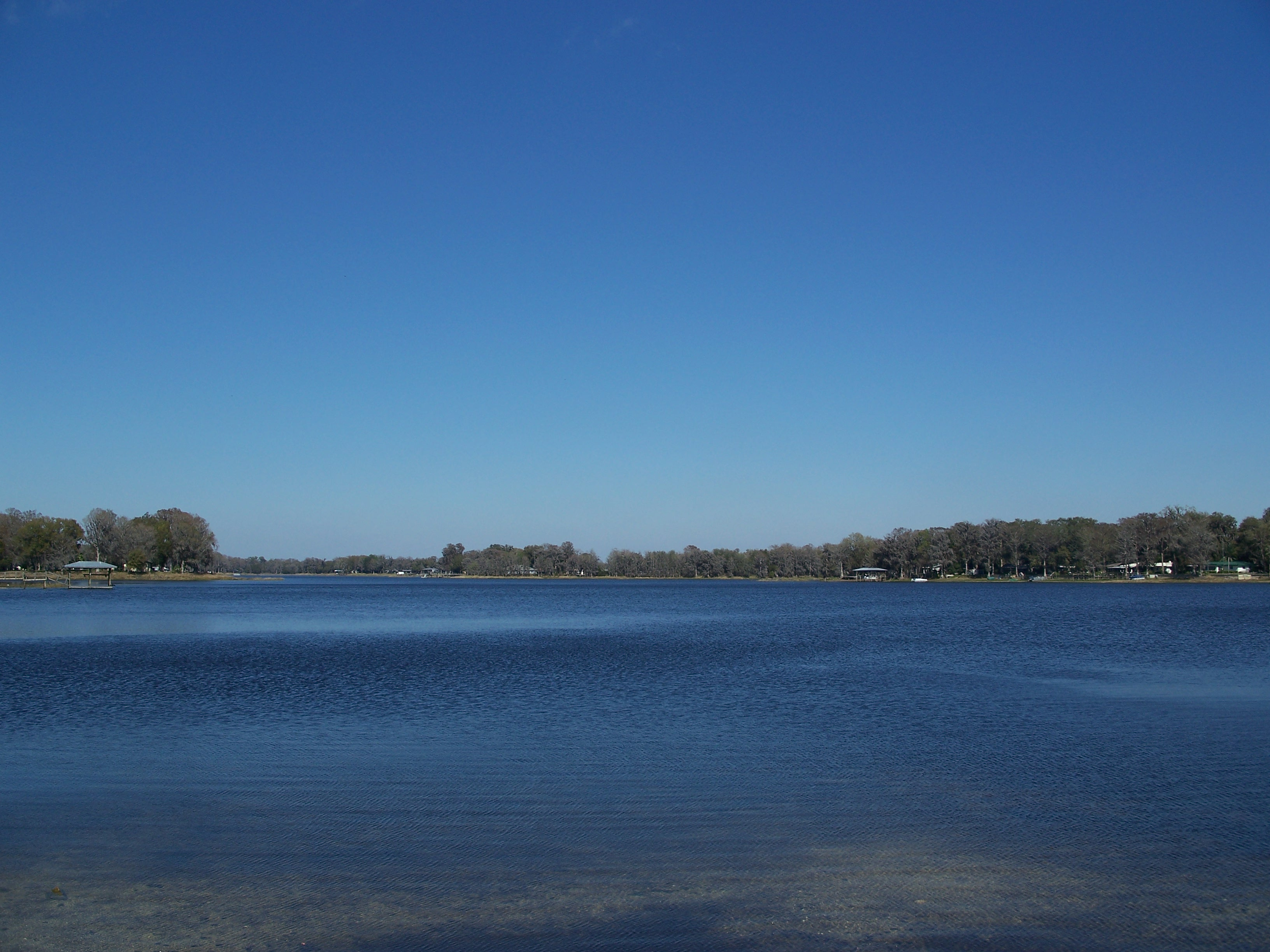
- Southern section near Floral City

- Location within Florida Location within the United States
- Location: Citrus County, Florida
- Coordinates: 28°52′31″N 82°18′9″W
- Type: chain
- Primary inflows: Withlacoochee River
- Primary outflows: Withlacoochee River
- Basin countries: United States
- Surface area: 19,111 acres (77.34 km^{2})
- Surface elevation: 36 ft (11 m)
- Settlements: Hernando, Inverness, Floral City

Tsala Apopka Lake is a chain of lakes located within a bend in the Withlacoochee River in Citrus County in north central Florida. This area is known historically as the Cove of the Withlacoochee.

Tsala Apopka Lake is composed of a number of lakes, swamps and marshes interspersed with islands, with a total open water surface area of about 19,111 acres (77.34 km^{2}). It is spread through an area of about 63,000 acres (250 km^{2}), bounded by State Road 200 to the north, State Road 48 to the south, the Withlacoochee River to the east, and US 41 to the west. About one-quarter of the area is in mesic hammocks or live oak scrub.

== Modern water control ==
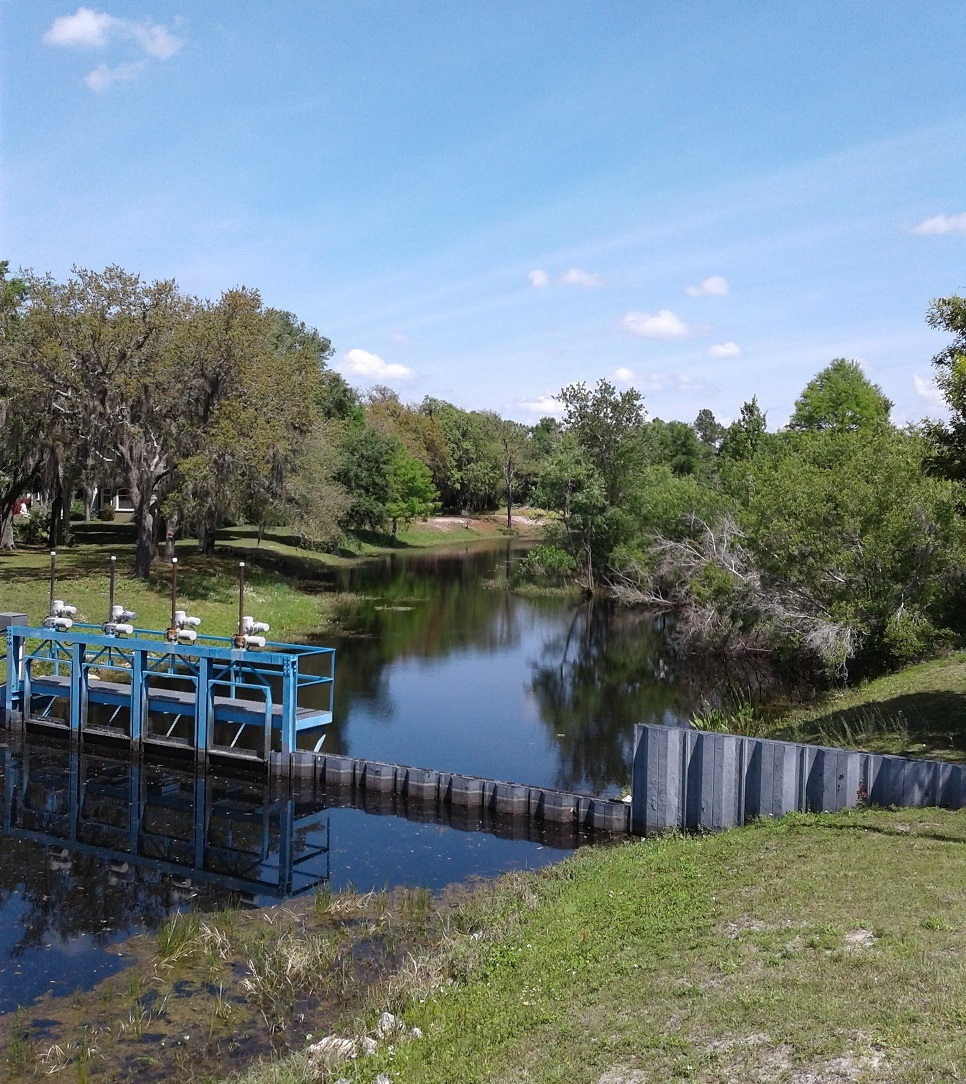
Tsala Lake water management controls, Inverness

Modern water control structures manage the water flow and divide the chain of lakes into three pools, Floral City, Hernando and Inverness. Historically, water flowed between the Withlacoochee River and Tsala Apopka Lake through wetlands. The main source of water flow into the chain of lakes today is through canals from the Withlacoochee River into the Floral City Pool. Water from the Floral City Pool flows partly into the Inverness Pool, and partly back into the Withlacoochee through canals. Most of the outflow from the Inverness Pool goes to the Hernando Pool, and thence into the Withlacoochee River. Tsala Apopka Lake lies in an area that has been labeled by geologists as the Tsala Apopka Plain of the Western Valley and the Tsala Apopka Basin of the Ocala Uplift Physiographic District.

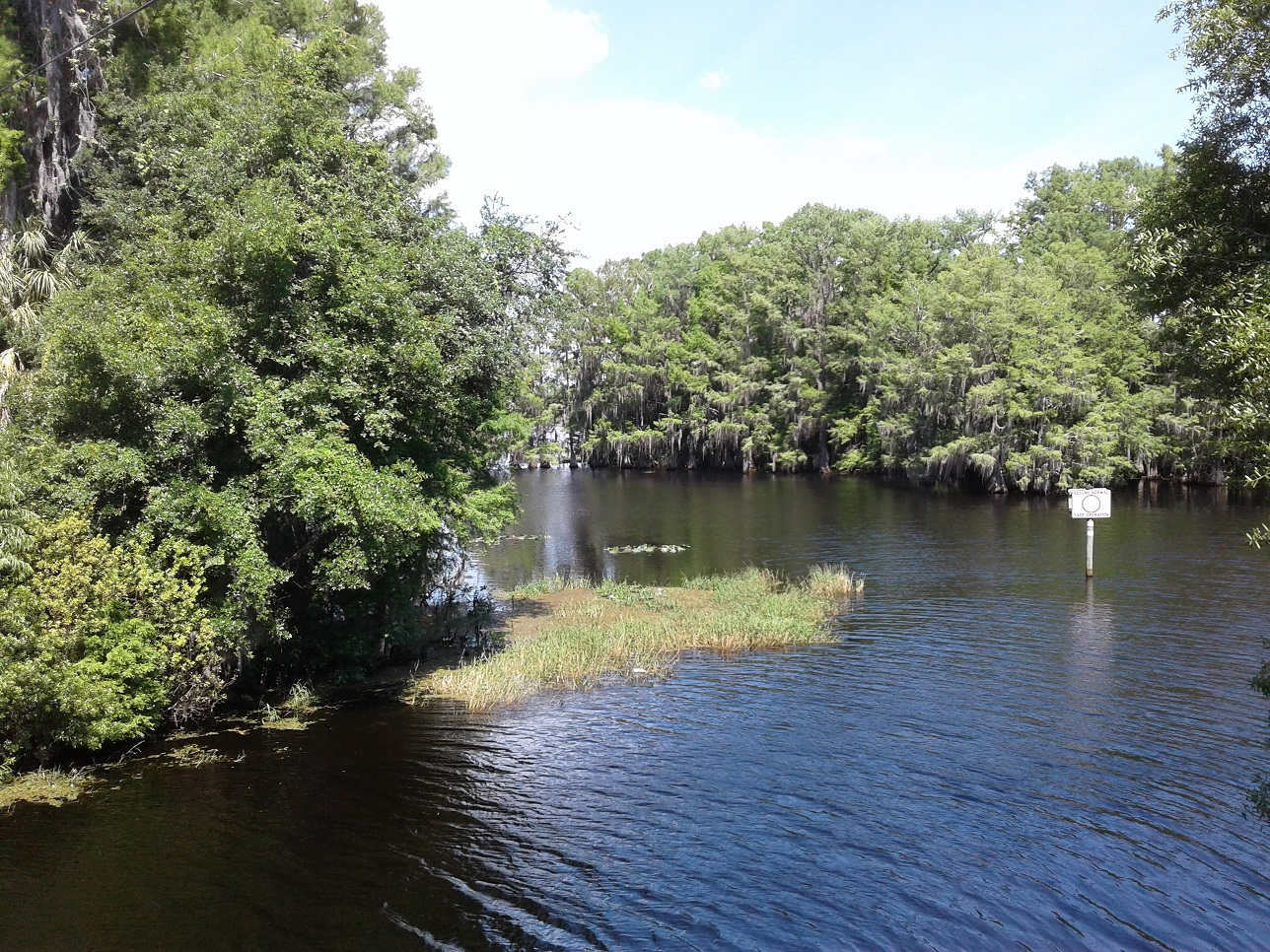
Lake Tsala Apopka, view from bridge on Gobbler Drive, in Floral City, Florida

== Early settlers ==
The Cove of the Withlacoochee was occupied by Indigenous peoples of Florida for many centuries. As of 1984, 30 archaeological sites had been identified in the area, with evidence of occupation by people of the Deptford, Weeden Island, and Safety Harbor cultures. The de Soto expedition crossed the middle section of the Cove in 1539 before reaching the Timucua town of Ocale. The Duval Island archaeological site (8Ci5), at the southern end of the Cove, is a likely location for the town of Tocaste named in the chronicles of the de Soto expedition. Another archaeological site, Tatham Mound (8Ci203), contained burials of a few people killed by sword blows, and of at least 77 individuals who apparently died at close to the same time, perhaps from an epidemic disease introduced by the de Soto expedition. The area supported a large Seminole population before and during the Second Seminole War. The Wild Hog Scrub archaeological site (8Ci198) has been tentatively identified as Powell's Town, Osceola's home at the beginning of the Second Seminole War. The Cove was a focus of military activity in the first year of the Second Seminole War, with large U.S. forces attacking the Seminoles there in December 1835, February–March 1836 and October–November 1836.
