= Brooker Creek Headwaters Nature Preserve =

Nature preserve, United States of America

- Location within Florida
- Location: Tampa, Florida
- Coordinates: 28.142°N 82.558°W
- Area: 1,111-acre (4.50 km^{2})
- Operator: Hillsborough County

Brooker Creek Headwaters Nature Preserve is located in northwest Hillsborough County, Florida and is managed by the county. The 1,111-acre (4.50 km^{2}) area is located at 18102 Ramblewood Road in Lutz, Florida and offers hiking opportunities. It protects wetlands and headwaters of the Brooker Creek watershed.
