= Starkey Wilderness Preserve =

Nature preserve in Pasco County, Florida, US

Coordinates: 28.256°N 82.59°W

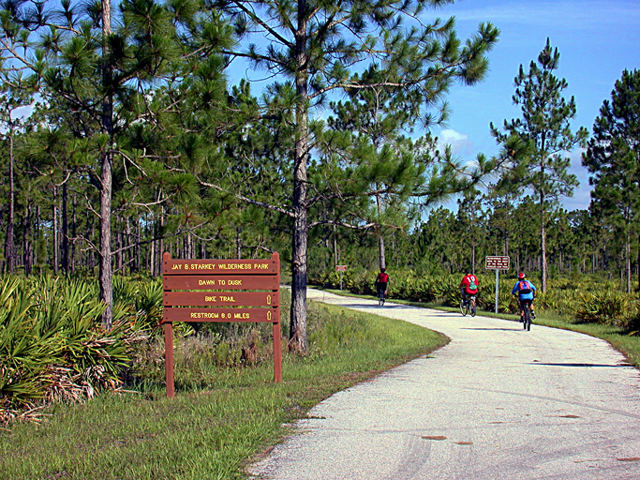
J.B. Starkey Wilderness Trail

Starkey Wilderness Preserve is a public recreation and nature conservation area located in Pasco County, Florida. The park includes a system of hiking, bicycling, and equestrian trails, cabins and primitive camping sites, and picnic areas. It is named after Jay B. Starkey, a cattle rancher who bought the property in 1937 and later donated hundreds of acres. The Preserve consists of three tracts: the Jay B. Starkey Wilderness Park, managed by Pasco County, and Serenova Tract and the Anclote River Ranch Tract, managed by Southwest Florida Water Management District. The area includes sections of pine flatwoods, cypress domes, freshwater marshes, stream and lake swamps, sandhill and scrub over a combined 8,500-acre (34 km^{2}) "wetland ecosystem spread throughout approximately 18,000 acres of conservation lands". The park is located in Western Pasco County east of New Port Richey. The park includes the Starkey Trail, an approximately 6.7 mile paved multi-use trail that links up with the Suncoast Trail at its eastern terminus. There are also unimproved trails in the park. An 8-mile mountain bike trail was approved and being developed as of 2013.
