= Withlacoochee River Park =

Park in Florida, United States

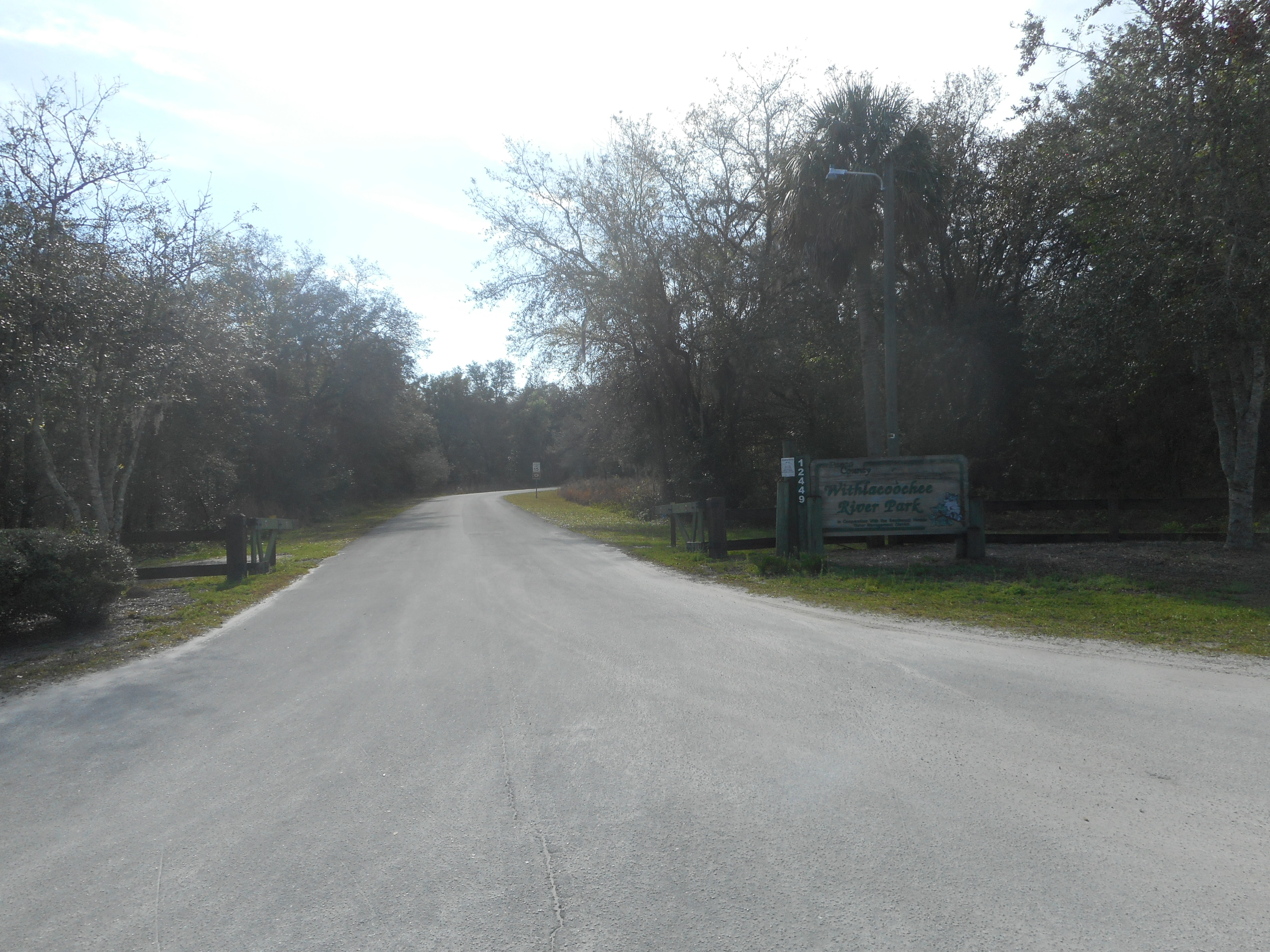
- The front gate of Withlacoochee River Park on Auton Road.

- Location within Florida Location within the United States
- Nearest city: Dade City, Florida
- Coordinates: 28.3448°N 82.1211°W

Withlacoochee River Park is located in Pasco County, in the U.S. state of Florida. The property is 260 acres (1.1 km^{2}) and is located at 12449 Withlacoochee Boulevard in Dade City. It includes a canoe launch, dock, 1.5 miles (2.4 km) of hiking trails, as well as bicycling, bird watching, picnic facilities, camping, fishing, an observation tower, and a 30-acre rec field. Habitats in the area include high sandhills and low riverine swamp.

Withlacoochee River Park is located northeast of the intersection of County Road 35 Alternate (Old Lakeland Highway) and County Road 52 Alternate (Clinton Avenue).
