= The Villages, Florida =

Census-designated place in Florida, United States

The Villages
- Census-designated place
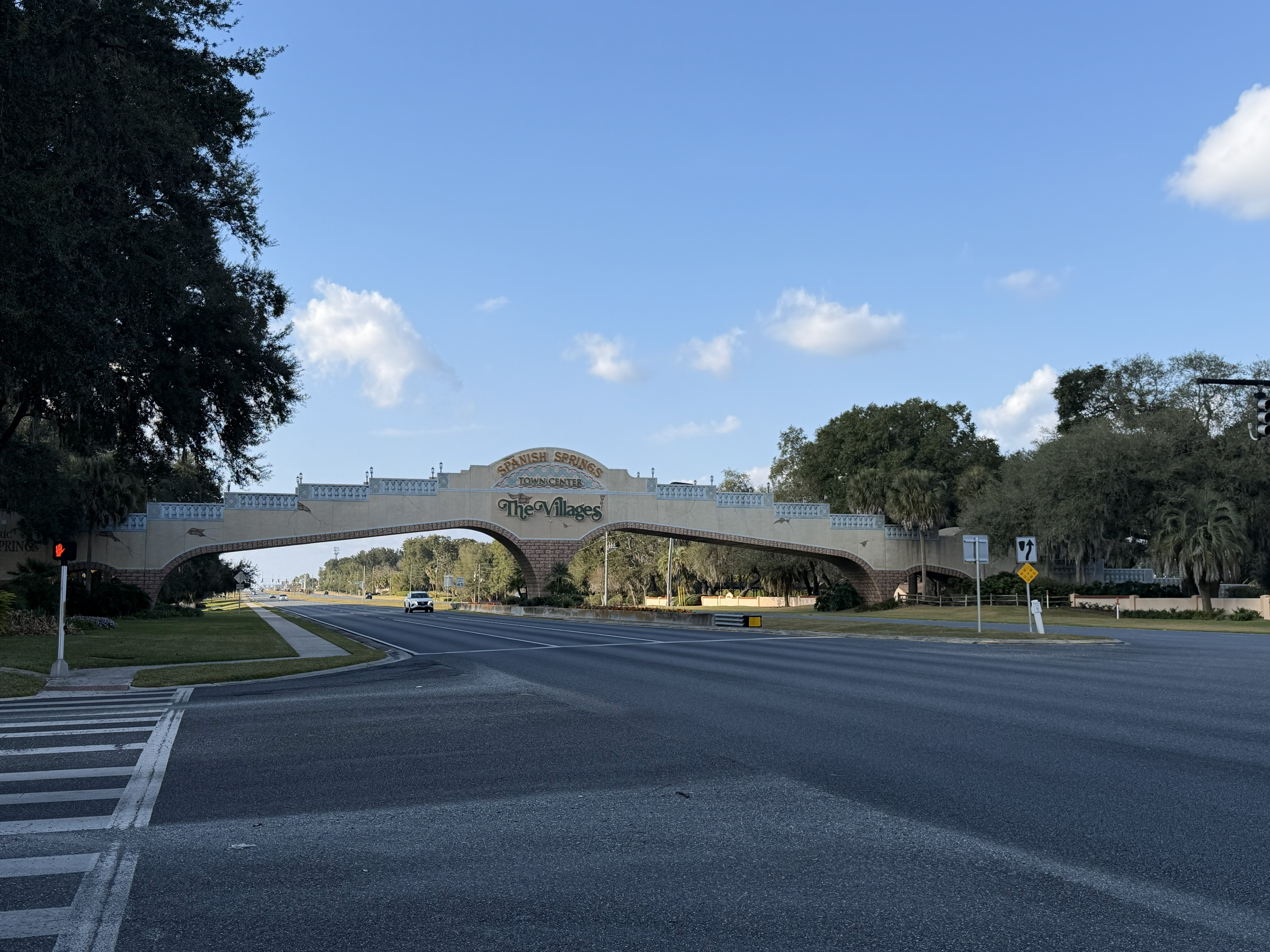
- Spanish Springs entrance arch at The Villages, Florida.

- Logo
- Nicknames: Florida's Friendliest Hometown, Boomer Paradise
- Interactive map of The Villages
- Coordinates: 28°54′12″N 81°59′19″W
- Country: United States
- State: Florida
- County: Sumter, Marion, Lake

Area
  - Total: 33.95 sq mi (87.94 km^{2})
  - Land: 32.65 sq mi (84.57 km^{2})
  - Water: 1.30 sq mi (3.37 km^{2})
- Elevation: 52 ft (16 m)

Population (2020)
  - Total: 79,077
  - Density: 2,421.8/sq mi (935.08/km^{2})
- Demonym: Villager
- Time zone: UTC-5 (EST)
  - Summer (DST): UTC-4 (EDT)
- ZIP code(s): 32159, 32162, 32163, 34731, 34785, 34762
- Area code: 352
- FIPS code: 12-71625
- GNIS feature ID: 2402925
- Website: thevillages.com

The Villages is a census-designated place (CDP) spanning Sumter, Marion, and Lake counties in the U.S. state of Florida. It serves as the central area of a larger master-planned, age-restricted community known as The Villages. Situated in central Florida, about 20 miles (32 km) south of Ocala and 45 miles (72 km) northwest of Orlando, the CDP had a population of 79,077 at the 2020 United States census. It is part of the Orlando–Kissimmee–Sanford metropolitan statistical area.

== History ==
In the 1960s, Michigan businessman Harold Schwartz began selling land in the area now known as The Villages through mail-order sales. In 1968, a federal law prohibiting real estate sales by mail order forced Schwartz and his business partner, Al Tarrson, to halt this practice.

In the early 1970s, Schwartz and Tarrson developed Orange Blossom Gardens, a mobile home park in northwestern Lake County. By the early 1980s, the community had sold approximately 400 units. In 1983, Schwartz bought out Tarrson’s interest and brought his son, H. Gary Morse, into the business. Inspired by successful retirement communities like Del Webb's Sun City, Morse expanded amenities, including golf courses and recreation centers, and pursued nearby commercial development. In 1992, the community was officially renamed "the Villages".

By the early 1990s, the Villages had grown to over 8,000 residents, with three golf courses and a Winn-Dixie supermarket. Between 2010 and 2019, the Villages was the top-selling master-planned community in the United States, with 24,440 homes sold.

The Villages operates under community development districts (CDDs), which manage infrastructure and amenities. In 2013, the Internal Revenue Service (IRS) ruled that $426 million in bonds issued by a CDD were not tax-exempt, as the district did not qualify as a government entity, resulting in approximately $750,000 in legal fees for residents.

=== Expansion ===
Since the 2010s, the Villages has expanded southward, acquiring land in Sumter and northward into Marion counties. In 2017, the Holding Company of the Villages purchased 8,000 acres south of Florida State Road 44 and 2,600 acres near County Road 470 for residential and commercial development, with plans for approximately 4,500 homes.

=== Community structure ===
The Villages is governed by community development districts and neighborhood declarations of restrictions, regulating aspects like landscaping and exterior modifications. An architectural review committee, composed of residents, oversees property alterations. As an age-restricted community, at least 80% of homes must have a resident aged 55 or older, and persons under 19 may not reside permanently, except in designated family subdivisions.

== Geography ==
The Villages is a census-designated place (CDP) spanning Sumter, Marion, and Lake counties in central Florida. According to the United States Census Bureau, the CDP covers a total area of 33.95 square miles (87.9 km^{2}), of which 32.65 square miles (84.6 km^{2}) is land and 1.30 square miles (3.4 km^{2}), or 3.83%, is water. It is located approximately 55 miles (89 km) northwest of Orlando and 80 miles (130 km) northeast of Tampa, with the city of Wildwood to the west and south, and the town of Lady Lake and city of Fruitland Park to the east.

The broader master-planned community extends beyond the CDP, covering approximately 57 square miles (150 km^{2}) across Sumter, Marion, and Lake counties, including areas north of Florida State Road 44 and south to five miles south of County Road 470. The community maintains an extensive network of private roads, totaling about 750 miles (1,210 km) as of 2018.

== Demographics ==
Historical population
Census	Pop.	Note	%±
2000	8,333		—
2010	51,442		517.3%
2020	79,077		53.7%
U.S. Decennial Census

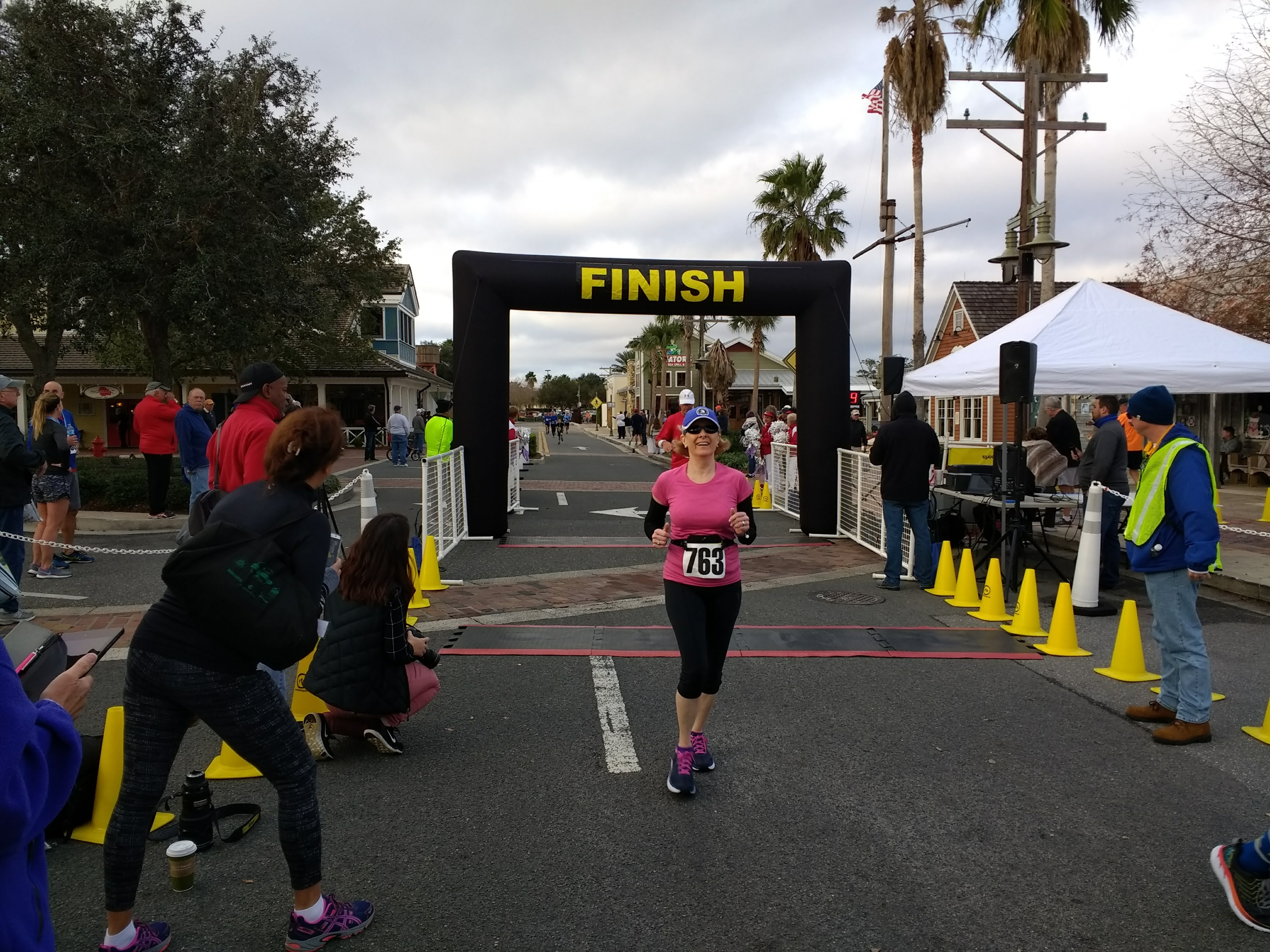
The finish line of a 5K run in Lake Sumter Landing in 2018.

=== Racial and ethnic composition ===
The Villages CDP, Florida – Racial and ethnic composition Note: the US Census treats Hispanic/Latino as an ethnic category. This table excludes Latinos from the racial categories and assigns them to a separate category. Hispanics/Latinos may be of any race.
Race / ethnicity (NH = Non-Hispanic)	Pop 2000	Pop 2010	Pop 2020	% 2000	% 2010	% 2020
White (NH)	8,100	49,840	75,374	97.20%	96.89%	95.32%
Black or African American (NH)	41	303	525	0.49%	0.59%	0.66%
Native American or Alaska Native (NH)	7	51	50	0.08%	0.10%	0.06%
Asian (NH)	44	340	616	0.53%	0.66%	0.78%
Pacific Islander or Native Hawaiian (NH)	1	6	9	0.01%	0.01%	0.01%
Some other race (NH)	1	12	135	0.01%	0.02%	0.17%
Mixed race or Multiracial (NH)	31	122	958	0.37%	0.24%	1.21%
Hispanic or Latino (any race)	108	768	1,410	1.30%	1.49%	1.78%
Total	8,333	51,442	79,077	100.00%	100.00%	100.00%

=== 2020 census ===
As of the 2020 census, The Villages had a population of 79,077. The median age was 73.2 years. 0.4% of residents were under the age of 18 and 84.7% of residents were 65 years of age or older. For every 100 females there were 84.6 males, and for every 100 females age 18 and over there were 84.6 males age 18 and over.

100.0% of residents lived in urban areas, while 0.0% lived in rural areas.

There were 45,640 households in The Villages, of which 1.3% had children under the age of 18 living in them. Of all households, 62.6% were married-couple households, 10.4% were households with a male householder and no spouse or partner present, and 23.3% were households with a female householder and no spouse or partner present. About 30.2% of all households were made up of individuals and 26.9% had someone living alone who was 65 years of age or older.

There were 53,054 housing units, of which 14.0% were vacant. The homeowner vacancy rate was 1.3% and the rental vacancy rate was 34.0%.

Racial composition as of the 2020 census
Race	Number	Percent
White	75,657	95.7%
Black or African American	541	0.7%
American Indian and Alaska Native	58	0.1%
Asian	620	0.8%
Native Hawaiian and Other Pacific Islander	11	0.0%
Some other race	286	0.4%
Two or more races	1,904	2.4%
Hispanic or Latino (of any race)	1,410	1.8%

=== 2019 estimates ===
In 2019, persons under five years accounted for 0.1% of the population, and 53.6% of the population was female. Median household income in 2019 was $63,841.

=== 2018 demographics ===
In 2018, the median age for both sexes in the Villages metropolitan statistical area is 67.4, 29 years older than a typical American and five years older than the median age of residents in the next-oldest county in the United States, which is on the Hawaiian island of Molokai.

=== Veteran population ===
According to Politico, as of 2018, the Villages was the home of the largest veteran population anywhere in the United States that does not have a military base, with 16.3 percent of the population former military.

=== 2010 census ===
As of the 2010 United States census, there were 51,442 people, 22,511 households, and 16,721 families residing in the CDP.

=== Home ownership ===
In the Villages, home ownership reflects the community's status as an age-restricted retirement destination. According to a 2020 analysis by the Consumer Financial Protection Bureau, women purchased 468 homes compared to 406 by men, a ratio of approximately 1.15:1, indicating a higher proportion of female buyers compared to other U.S. metropolitan areas.

A 2021 Realtor.com report noted that the average down payment for homes in the Villages was 27.1%, among the highest in the United States, with a median home list price of $366,950.

=== Crime ===
According to an investigative report by WFTV News in Orlando, crime in the Villages is low and usually imported from other areas outside the community. The report stated that property crime and crimes of opportunity are approximately one-third lower than the average for the state of Florida. According to federal statistics, the statistics for violent crimes in the Villages area is half the state average. Rates of driving under the influence charges are approximately equivalent to those of other similarly sized places in Florida.

== Economy ==
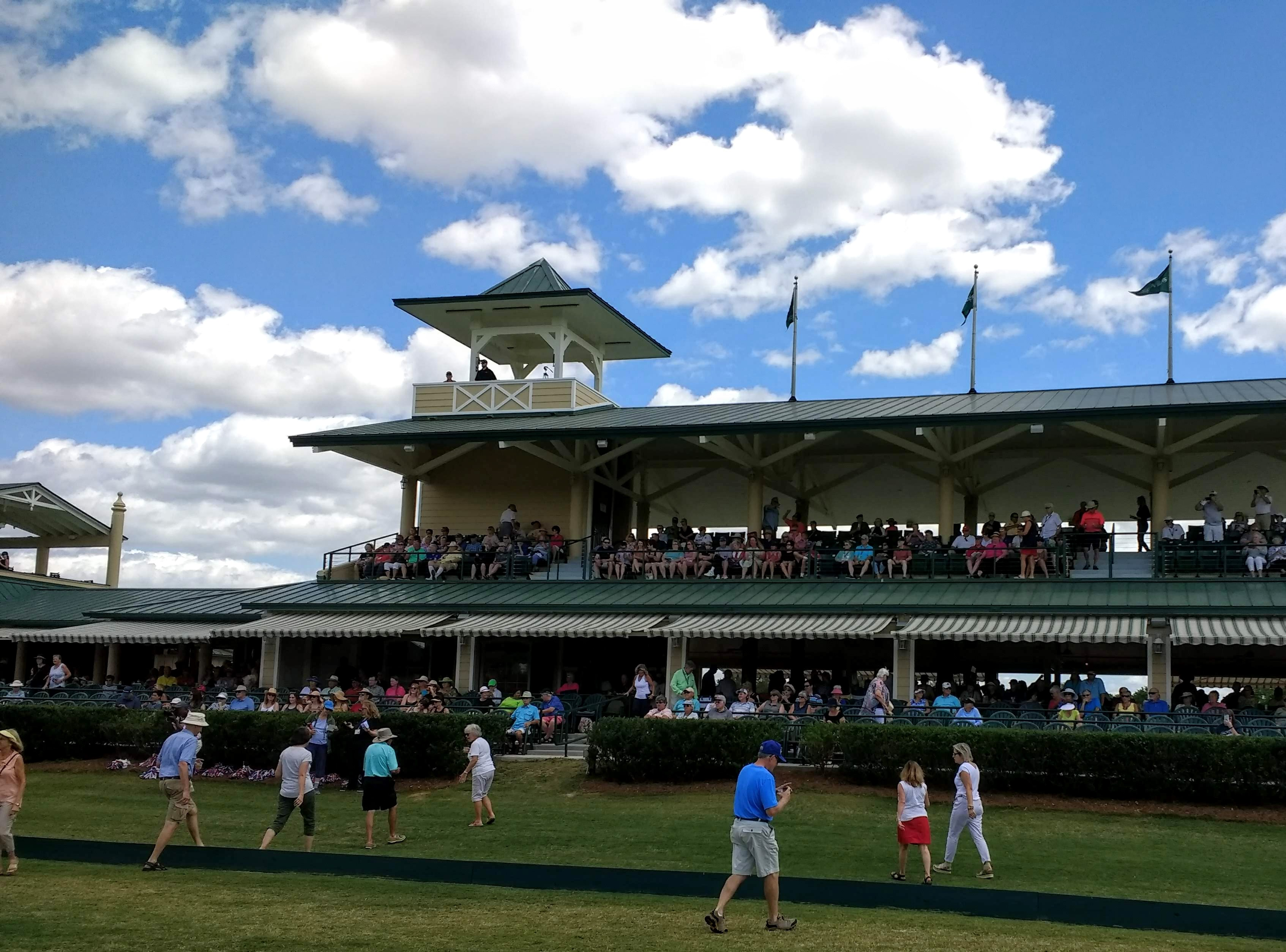
Polo Stadium in The Villages

The Villages supports an economy centered on retail, healthcare, and services tailored to its age-restricted population. As of 2016, the community had developed approximately 5.7 million square feet of commercial space, hosting businesses such as restaurants, specialty retail, and medical facilities.

Commercial areas include five town centers—Spanish Springs, Lake Sumter Landing, Brownwood Paddock Square, Eastport, and Sawgrass Grove—each around 500,000 square feet, featuring a mix of shops, dining, entertainment, and services. The community hosts 18 grocery stores, including nine Publix supermarkets, three Winn-Dixie stores, the Fresh Market, Sprouts Farmers Market, Target, two Walmart Supercenters, and a Walmart Neighborhood Market. Citizens First Bank, a local community bank, operates 12 branches within the Villages. Commercial spaces maintain high occupancy rates, averaging around 97% as of 2018.

From 2007 to 2017, the Villages Metropolitan Statistical Area (MSA) saw significant economic growth, with its gross domestic product (GDP) increasing by 51.4% to $2.1 billion. Between 2010 and 2018, the MSA added approximately 13,900 jobs, primarily in retail, healthcare, and construction, driven by the community’s expansion.

== Arts and culture ==
=== Entertainment ===
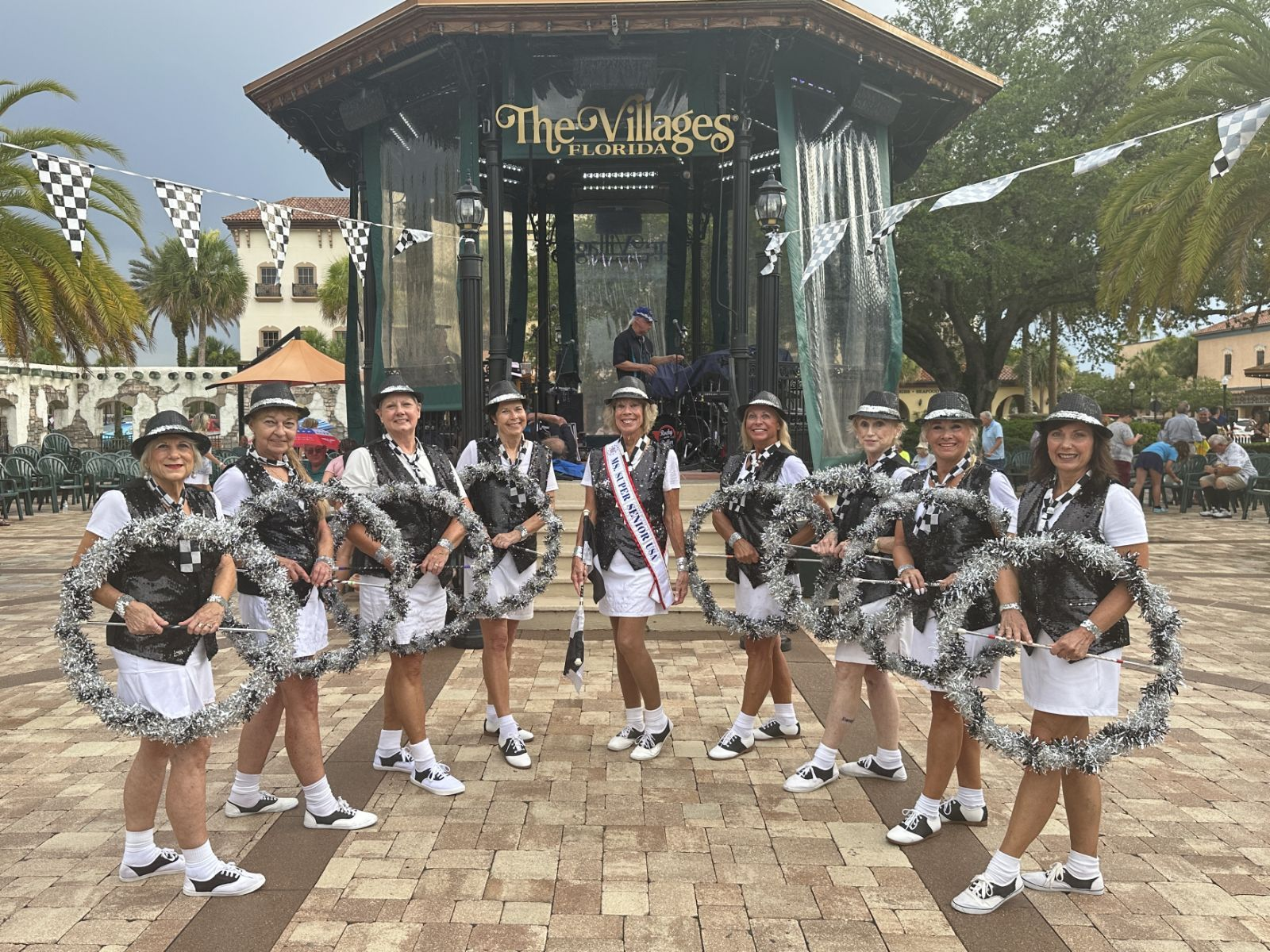
One of multiple baton twirling groups in the Villages, the Prime Time Twirlers.

In 2015, the Sharon L. Morse Performing Arts Center, a venue with over 1,000 seats, opened. The Studio Tierra Del Sol, a black box theatre with seating for 100, opened in 2016.

Fictitious historical markers and architectural details provide an atmosphere for the residents. One historian wrote, "The Villages' faux history gives a patina of stability and continuity to a highly volatile region and stage of life." Many plaques represent the "downtown areas" as if events derived from notions of an idyllic small town in the 1800s had occurred there. Such "American myths" feature in the designs for Brownwood, Lake Sumter Landing, and Spanish Springs.

=== Other activities ===
The Villages operates golf courses, recreation centers, softball fields, a polo stadium called the Villages Polo Stadium, a woodworking shop, and a lifelong learning college. There are also outdoor target archery ranges.

== Recreation ==
=== Clubs ===
The Villages hosts over 3,500 resident-led clubs, offering activities such as sports, arts, crafts, music, and social gatherings, which foster community engagement among its age-restricted population. Examples include the Pickleball Club, the Villages Woodworkers Club, Line Dance Club, the Villages Single Seniors, the Villages Garden Club, and the Veterans Club, catering to diverse interests from athletics to social connections.

=== Annual events ===
The Villages host the Senior Games each April, where approximately 2,000 residents compete in hundreds of athletic events. The top five athletes in each age division then compete in the Florida Senior Games. For 18 years, the Senior Games have taken place in the Villages.

== Parks and recreation ==
The Villages offers extensive recreational facilities and activities tailored to its age-restricted population, primarily funded through a monthly amenities fee of approximately $189. These include golf courses, recreation centers, resident-led clubs, parks, and trails, fostering an active lifestyle for residents.

=== Golf courses ===
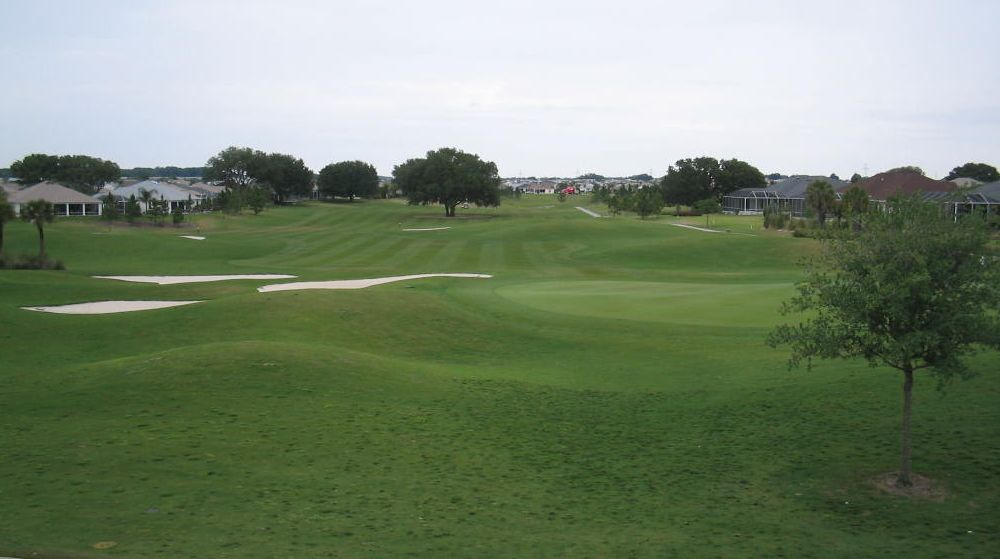
The 18th green at Tierra Del Sol, one of the twelve country club golf courses at the Villages

The Villages operates 56 golf courses with 729 holes, including 42 nine-hole executive golf courses, 12 country club championship courses, and two specialty putting courses. A golf instruction academy provides lessons and clinics for residents.

=== Recreation centers ===
The Villages operates over 100 recreation centers, offering facilities for sports, fitness, and social activities. These include courts for pickleball, tennis, bocce, shuffleboard, and horseshoes, as well as swimming pools, billiards, fitness centers, and spaces for theatrical and musical productions. Notable centers, such as the Eisenhower Regional Recreation Center, feature unique amenities like military history exhibits. The Enrichment Academy, launched in 2017, offers over 140 fee-based courses in topics like scuba diving, culinary arts, and photography.

=== Clubs and activities ===
Over 3,000 resident-led clubs provide opportunities for social and recreational engagement, including the Pickleball Club, the Villages Woodworkers Club, Line Dance Club, the Villages Single Seniors, the Villages Garden Club, and the Veterans Club. Additional activities include archery, air gun ranges, volleyball, croquet, and fishing, with specialized programs like S.T.A.R. for adults with special needs. Weekly events, such as live music and trivia, occur at town squares and recreation centers.

=== Parks and trails ===
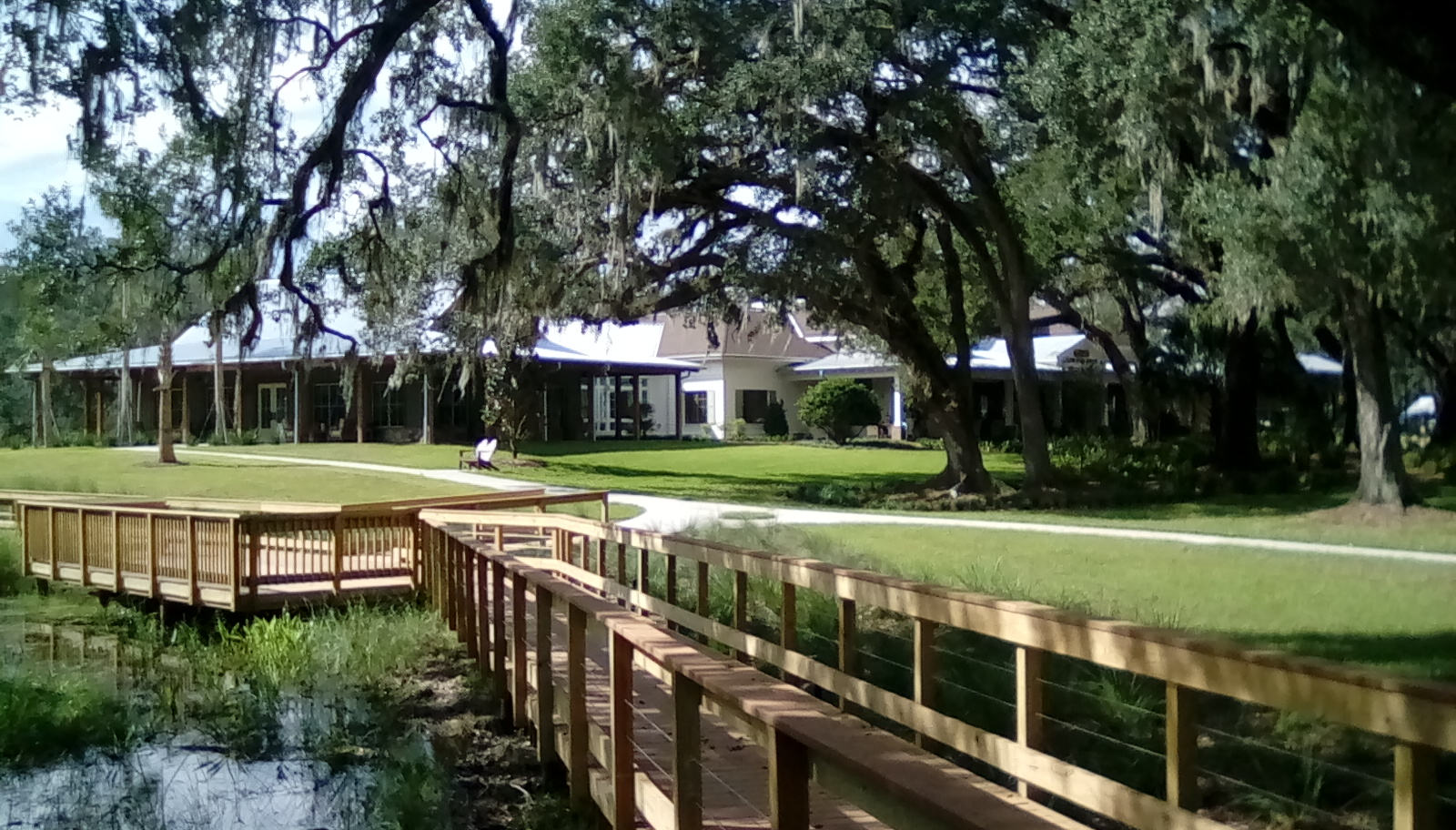
The Fenney Recreational Center showing a portion of the Fenney Springs Nature Trail.

The Villages features numerous parks, dog parks, and fitness trails, open daily from dawn to dusk. Notable areas include Lake Sumter Landing’s waterfront park, Fenney Springs Nature Trail, and four dog parks (Paradise, Mulberry, Atlas, and Dudley). These spaces support activities like walking, picnicking, and pet recreation, enhancing the community’s outdoor lifestyle.

== Government ==
The Villages operates under a system of community development districts (CDDs) and local government jurisdictions across Sumter, Marion, and Lake counties, serving its age-restricted population. The community is known for high voter turnout, with approximately 80% participation in elections as of 2012, and a significant Republican voter base.

=== Representation ===
The Villages is located in Florida's 6th and 11th congressional districts, which are represented by Republicans Randy Fine and Daniel Webster, respectively. At the state level, it falls within Florida Senate District 12, represented by Republican Dennis Baxley, and Florida House of Representatives District 26, represented by Republican Keith Truenow. County representation includes Sumter County Districts 1 and 3, Marion County District 3, and Lake County District 1.

=== Local government ===
Most of the Villages is governed by 17 community development districts (CDDs), special-purpose local governments under Florida law, responsible for infrastructure maintenance, recreation, public safety, sanitation, and open spaces. Each CDD is managed by a board of supervisors, with funding from property taxes and user fees, such as the monthly amenities fee. Four additional districts—Village Center (VCCDD), Sumter Landing (SLCDD), Brownwood (BCDD), and North Sumter County Utility (NSCUDD)—handle commercial areas, utilities, and services, overseen by boards composed of developer affiliates due to the absence of residents in these zones. Portions in Lady Lake fall under municipal jurisdiction, outside some CDDs. Two homeowners associations, the Property Owners Association (POA) and the Villages Homeowners Association (VHA), address resident concerns and community standards.

=== Politics and elections ===
The Villages is a stronghold for the Republican Party, with registered Republicans outnumbering Democrats two-to-one as of 2012. Its high voter turnout and conservative majority make it a frequent stop for Republican candidates, including former presidents George W. Bush and Donald Trump, who visited in 2004 and 2019–2020, respectively, and vice presidents Dick Cheney, Sarah Palin, and Mike Pence, and other political figures such as Marco Rubio, Rick Scott, and Mitt Romney. The community’s political significance stems from its large, engaged retiree population.

== Education ==
=== Primary and secondary education ===
The Villages is primarily an age-restricted community, prohibiting full-time residents under age 19 except in three designated family-unit neighborhoods (Bison Valley, Oak Meadows, and Spring Arbor) or through hardship exemptions granted by the Village Center Community Development District. School zoning applies for tax purposes and the few families residing in these neighborhoods.

- The Marion County portion of the Villages, which has no family-unit neighborhoods, is zoned to Lake Weir High School within the Marion County Public Schools system.
- The Sumter County portion, including Bison Valley, is zoned to Wildwood Middle High School within the Sumter District Schools.
- The Lake County portion, including Oak Meadows and Spring Arbor, is zoned to Leesburg High School within the Lake County Schools.

The Villages Charter Schools, a K–12 charter school in unincorporated Sumter County, serves children of employees working directly for the Villages, its subcontractors, or businesses located within the community. Children residing in family-unit neighborhoods or granted exemptions do not automatically qualify for enrollment unless a parent meets these employment criteria.

=== Post-secondary education ===
The Villages offers lifelong learning opportunities through the Enrichment Academy, launched in 2017 by the Recreation and Parks Department. The academy provides over 140 fee-based, noncredit courses covering topics such as scuba diving, literature, philosophy, culinary arts, foreign language, photography, and technology. Classes are held at designated recreation centers and approved sites throughout the community.

== Media ==
Television channels from the Orlando market serve the Villages, although channels from the Tampa market also cover the area. It is also served by radio stations from both the Orlando and Ocala areas and by area newspapers such as the Orlando Sentinel, the Tampa Bay Times, the Leesburg Daily Commercial, and the Ocala Star-Banner.

A documentary called Some Kind of Heaven, about four residents of the Villages, was released in January 2021. The documentary The Bubble, also released in 2021, depicts life inside the Villages.

=== Local media ===
The Villages developers or their successors own and operate three media properties:

- The Villages News Network (VNN), comprising three channels (news and lifestyle reporting, public event calendar and human interest, and 24-hour weather) airs on local cable networks, including Comcast and Spectrum.
- The Villages Daily Sun, a local newspaper with 43,610 paid subscribers.
- Radio station WVLG (640), carrying classic hits.

Public radio station WMFV (89.5) serves the area and is owned by the same group as Orlando public radio station WMFE-FM, with some variations from WMFE's master schedule.

== Infrastructure ==
=== Transportation ===
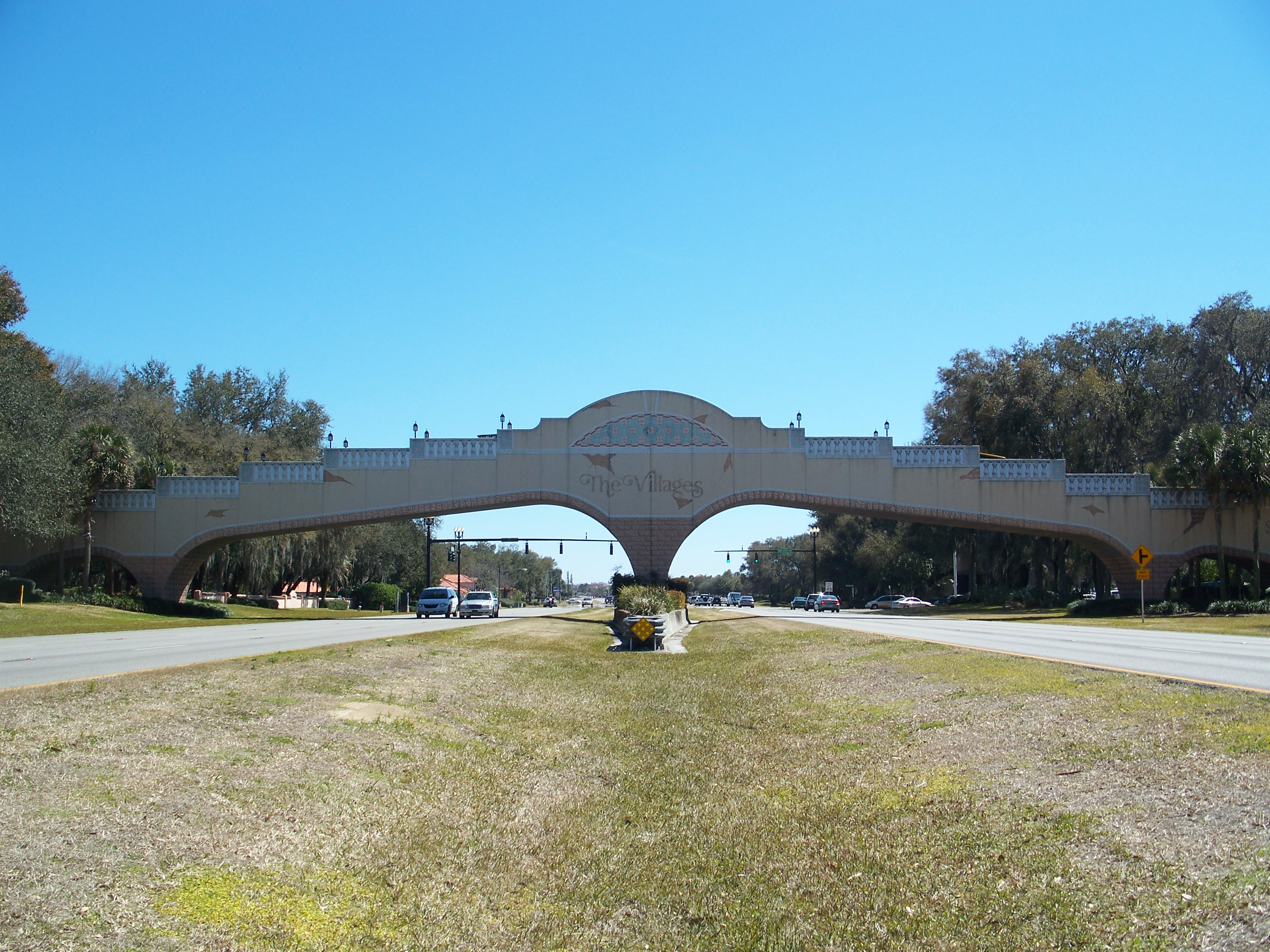
Golf cart bridge over US 27/US 441

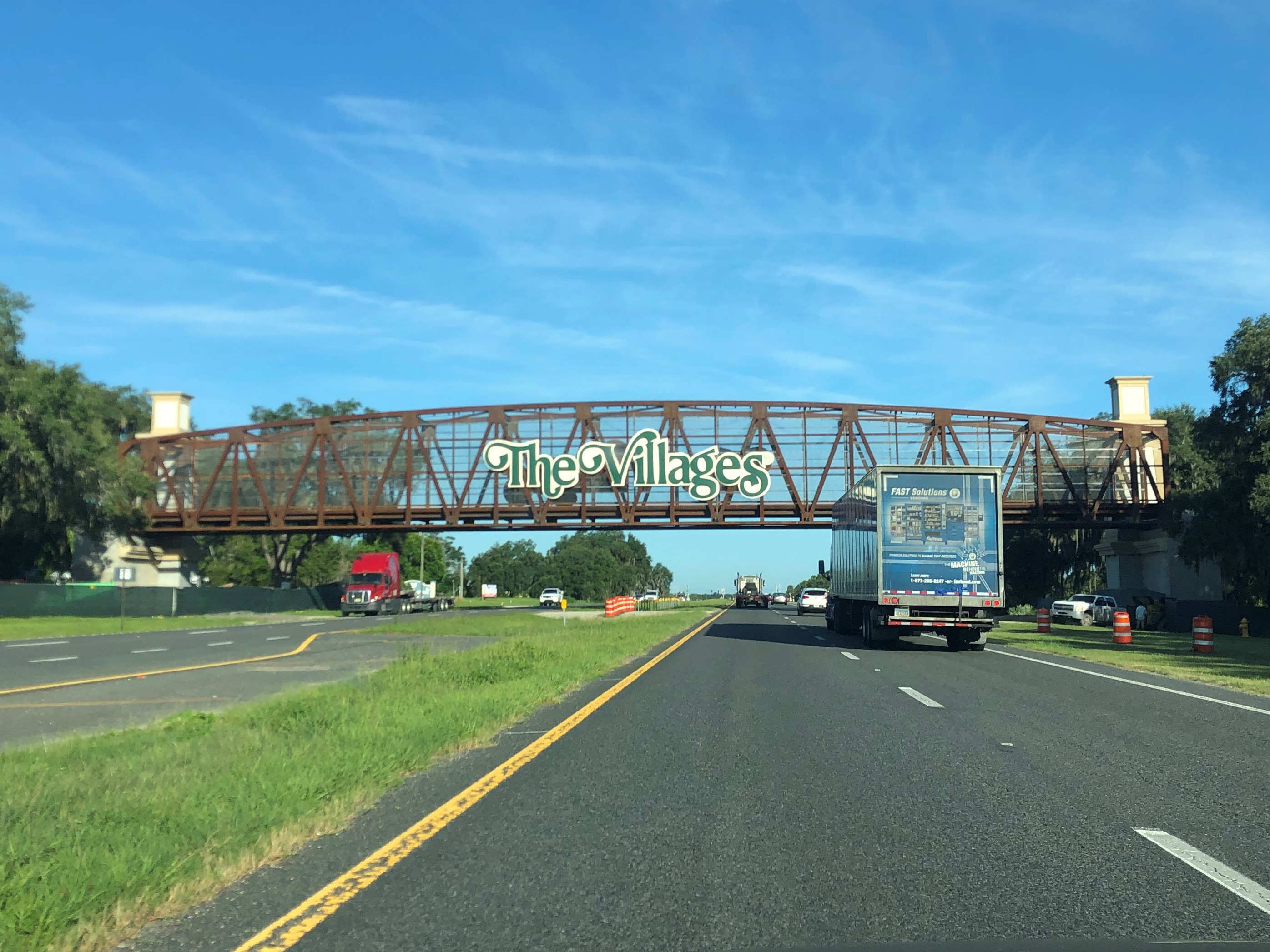
Golf cart bridge over SR 44 at Brownwood Paddock Square

=== Highways ===
The Villages development is bounded roughly by US 27/US 441 to the east, US 301 to the west, County Road 42 (CR 42) to the north, and CR 470 to the south. On December 10, 2013, the Villages of Lake-Sumter Inc. agreed to an $8 million deal to purchase the Pine Ridge Dairy tract in Fruitland Park, Florida, with a planned construction of 2,038 new Villages homes. Although CR 466 previously served as the central east–west corridor, the addition of homes and facilities south of it and in the city of Fruitland Park, Florida has turned the highway into a secondary east–west corridor. Buena Vista Boulevard and Morse Boulevard serve as significant north–south corridors.

The construction of four additional golf cart overpasses were finished between 2020 and 2023. The Chitty Chatty Bridge, crossing Florida State Road 44 (SR 44) near Rohan Recreation Center and Lake Deaton Plaza, opened to traffic in October 2020. A second overpass, the Brownwood Bridge, which crosses SR 44 near Brownwood Paddock Square, opened to traffic the following December. A third overpass, the Water Lily Bridge crossing Florida's Turnpike near Water Lily Recreation Center, opened in March 2021. The Southern Oaks Bridge, also crossing the Turnpike just south of the Okahumpka Service Plaza, opened in August 2023.

=== Public transportation ===
The Villages developers operate a trolley-style bus tour of the community from the sales and information center at the Market Square in Lake Sumter Landing.

Until 2004, when the train was shortened to Savannah, Georgia, Amtrak's Palmetto (then on a New York–Tampa itinerary) served adjacent Wildwood. Amtrak's Amtrak Thruway bus service stops in the Villages. The bus travels from Jacksonville to Dade City and is timed to meet arrivals and departures of the Silver Star train in Jacksonville.

=== Autonomous vehicles ===
In early 2018, the Villages was chosen for a pilot program offering autonomous taxis in the area of Lake Sumter Landing. This made the Villages one of the first cities in the United States to offer paid taxi services using autonomous vehicles throughout the community. In the early stages of the program, the vehicle was to have a safety driver in the driver's seat, and later, the driver was to be removed, with the automobile monitored from a control station. The taxis were to be operated by Voyage Auto, a startup company from San Jose, California. As of 2019, the Villages held a 0.5 percent stake in Voyage Auto.

== Notable people ==
- Megan Boone, American actress, descendant of founders Schwartz and Morse
- Ray Knight, American former Major League Baseball player
- Nancy Lopez, American retired professional golfer
- Tre Mann, professional basketball player
- Michelle Marie Newton, American woman missing for 42 years after she was abducted by her own mother at age 3. She lived in The Villages with her mother until her mother's arrest in 2025.
- John O'Shaughnessy, British marketing academic
- Bob Stinson, American former baseball player

== In popular culture ==
- Some Kind of Heaven, a 2020 documentary about the Villages
