= Citizens First Bank =

Bank in Florida, United States

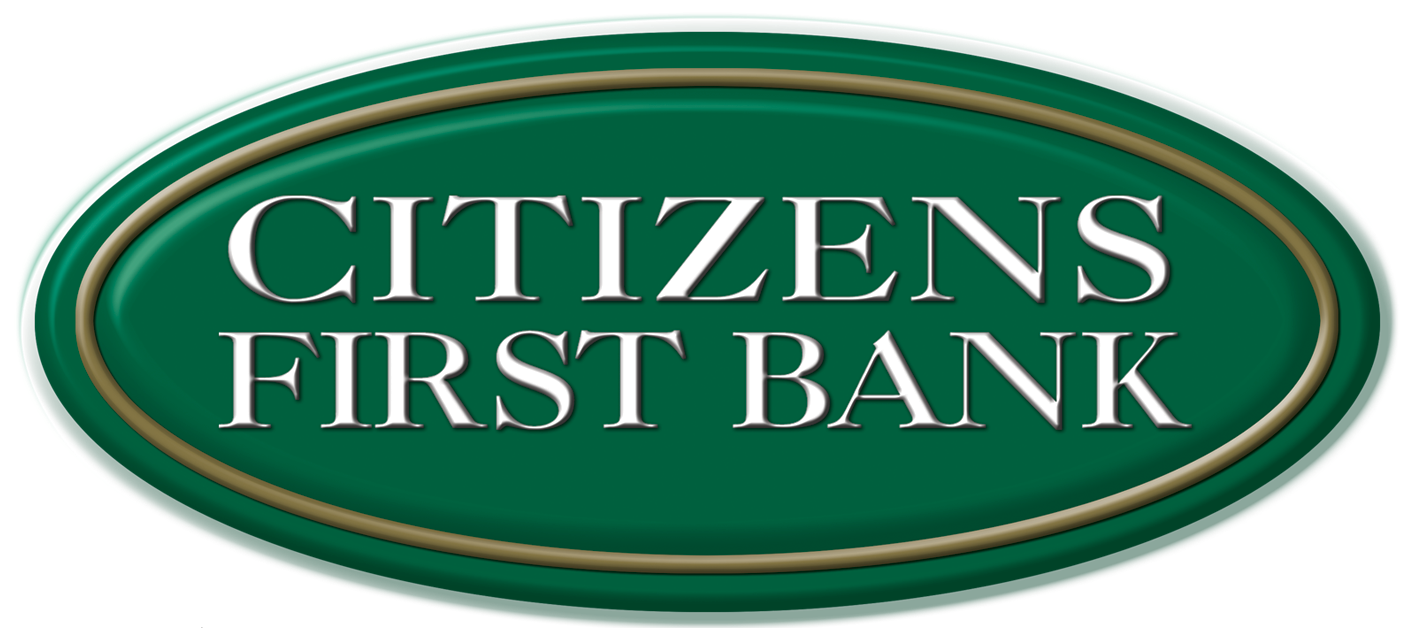

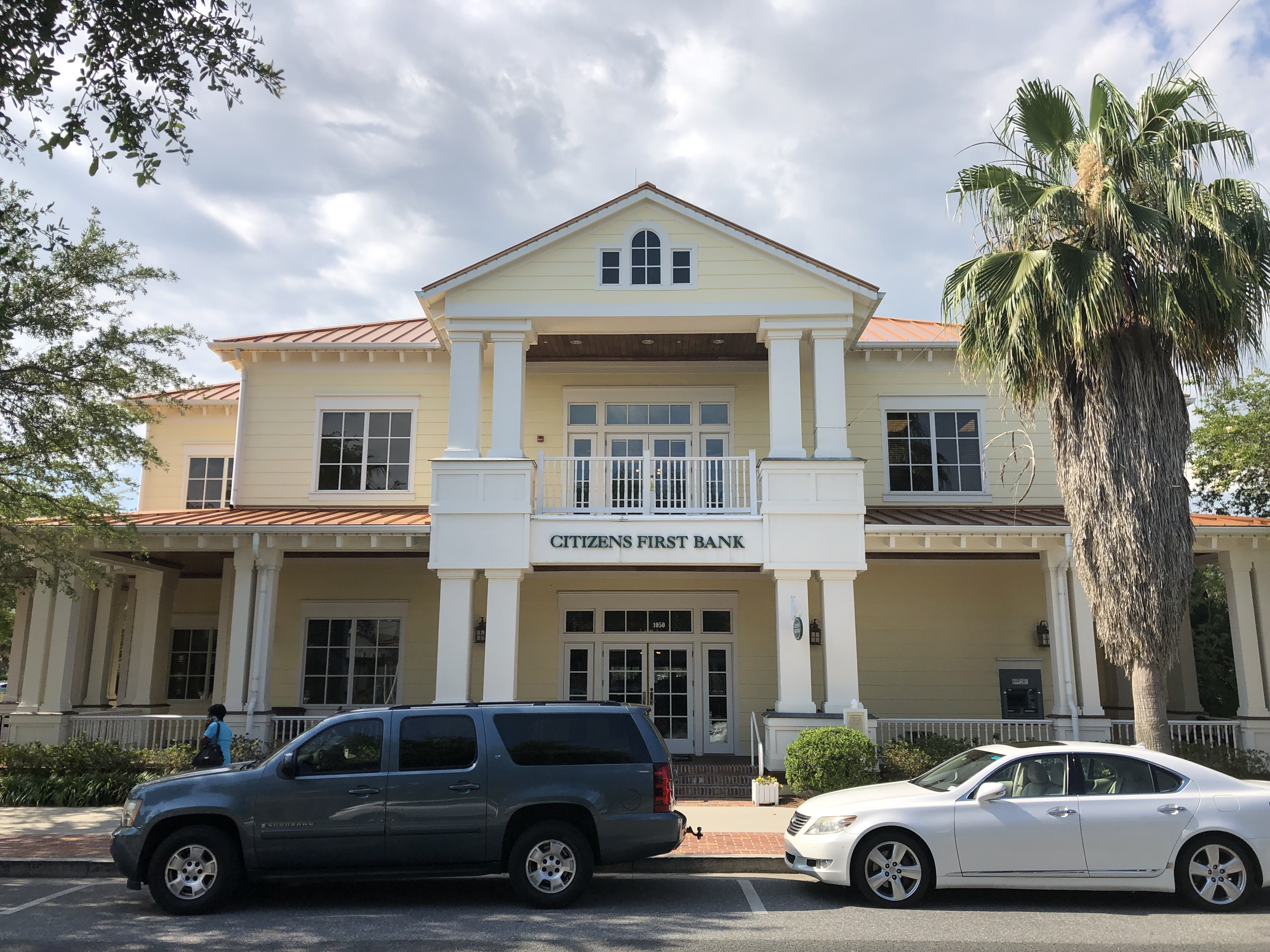
- Citizens First Bank Lake Sumter Landing Branch
- Formerly: First Bank of the Villages
- Industry: Banking
- Founded: 1991; 35 years ago
- Defunct: October 1, 2025
- Fate: Merged into Seacoast National Bank
- Headquarters: The Villages, Florida, United States
- Number of locations: 14 (2021)
- Area served: Central Florida; The Villages, Florida
- Key people: Lindsey M. Blaise, President & CEO
- Products: Checking accounts, savings accounts, IRAs, CDs, credit cards, and mortgage loans.
- Total assets: $3.6 billion (2021)
- Number of employees: 364 (2021)
- Parent: Villages Bancorporation, Inc.
- Website: mycitizensfirst.com

Citizens First Bank was an American community bank that was headquartered in The Villages, Florida. It was founded on July 1, 1991.

As of 2021, Citizens First Bank had 14 branches throughout Central Florida. It holds more than $2 billion in assets and is insured by the Federal Deposit Insurance Corporation. Citizens First Bank is the tenth largest bank in the state of Florida.

A 2014 report claimed that over 72 percent of residents in The Villages, Florida banked with Citizens First Bank. As of 2018, Citizens First Bank had a market share of over 51 percent in The Villages. The company has been noted for its customer service, particularly offering amenities such as lobby hosts and popcorn to customers. The bank has a primarily older clientele, composed mainly of retirees and seasonal residents.

In late May 2025, Seacoast Banking announced its acquisition of Villages Bancorporation (VBI), the parent company of Citizens First Bank, in a $710.8 million transaction. The acquisition was completed on October 1, 2025, when Citizens First Bank merged into Seacoast National Bank.

== History ==
Originally founded as First Bank of the Villages in 1991, Citizens First Bank was renamed in 1998. Citizens First Bank was created by Harold Schwartz, the founder of The Villages. According to Schwartz, the bank was "created specifically to fill the needs of our community and to conscientiously and joyously serve our Villages residents in every possible way." In 2001, the bank moved their headquarters from Lady Lake, Florida to The Villages, Florida. Lindsey M. Blaise, granddaughter of Villages founder Gary Morse, has served as President & CEO since 2019. In 2017, Citizens First Bank sold its Leesburg, Florida branch to a real estate developer and moved to a newly built location. The company also announced plans to open a new branch in Fruitland Park, Florida that year.

In 2018, Citizens First Bank purchased a branch office from CBC National Bank in The Villages, FL. At the time of purchase, the branch had about $35 million in deposits. In 2018, the company announced plans to open a new branch near the Village of Fenney, further expanding southward.

In 2019, news broke of the bank's plans to build a new headquarters in Wildwood, Florida. In January 2019, the Wildwood City Council accepted a $3 million offer for an 18-acre parcel of city-owned land. The company plans to build a 45,000-square-foot administrative building on the land.

In October 2019, the company announced plans to open a new branch in Ocala, Florida.

=== Acquisition by Seacoast ===
In May 2025, Seacoast Banking Corp. announced its acquisition of Villages Bancorporation (VBI), the parent company of Citizens First Bank, in a $710.8 million transaction expected to close in the fourth quarter of 2025. Citizens First Bank holds over 50% of the deposit share in The Villages, Florida's largest retirement community with 150,000 residents. The acquisition will add 19 branches and $4.1 billion in assets to Seacoast's portfolio, increasing its total assets to $21 billion, deposits to $17 billion, and gross loans to $12 billion upon completion. The deal aligns with Seacoast's expansion strategy in central Florida following its recent approval to acquire Heartland Bancshares and is expected to enhance earnings per share by 22% in 2026. The deal was completed on October 1, 2025, with a final consideration of approximately $829 million.

== Structure ==
Citizens First Bank is owned and operated by Villages Bancorporation, Inc. As of 2021, the bank had over 300 employees, fourteen branch locations, and over 70 ATMs throughout Central Florida. Citizens First Bank operates mainly in The Villages, Florida, with branches in the surrounding communities of Leesburg, Florida and Fruitland Park, Florida. The bank also began operating a branch in Clermont, Florida in 2007, but later closed it.

== Other services ==
Citizens First Bank offers wealth and investment management services under the name Citizens First Wealth Advisors.

== Community involvement ==
Citizens First Bank has been involved in numerous community outreach efforts over the years, including homebuilding partnerships with Habitat for Humanity, scholarship donations to the Buffalo Scholarship Foundation, and participation in local events such as the Villages Charter School Annual BBQ Bash, Bless Fruitland Park's Love Week and The Villages Relay for Life. Citizens First Bank also created a scam prevention program called Fraud Busters. Since its inception in 2009, the program has saved customers nearly $1 million by stopping scam-related activity. In 2018, Citizens First Bank sponsored the construction of a home in Lady Lake, Florida, in partnership with Habitat for Humanity of Lake-Sumter. In 2020, during the coronavirus crisis, Citizens First Bank successfully secured $105 million in Paycheck Protection Program funds for small businesses in the area.

== Awards ==
In 2019, Coral Gables, Florida, based financial rating agency Bauer Financial, gave Citizens First Bank a five-star rating.

In May 2020, Citizens First Bank was named number 24 out of 25 for banks with more than $1 billion in assets in the Independent Community Bankers of America's Best of the Best.

In June 2020, DepositAccounts.com named Citizens First Bank as one of its Top 200 Healthiest Banks of 2020.
