= Joe Esposito (basketball) =

American basketball coach (born 1966)

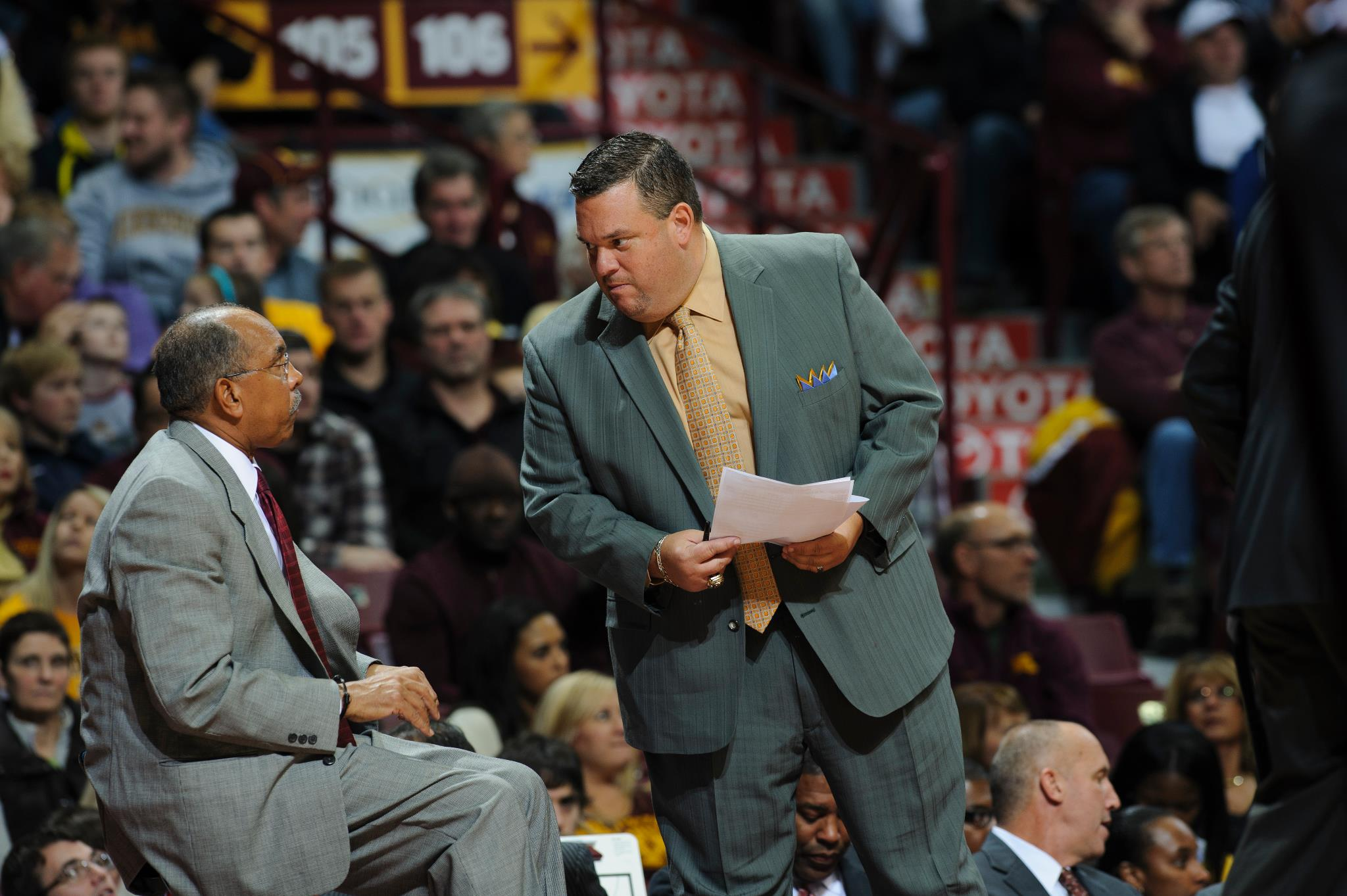

Biographical details
- Born: September 21, 1966 (age 60); New York, New York
- Education: Under Grad: Marist College 88' Grad:United States Sports Academy 90'

Coaching career (HC unless noted)
- 1986–1988: Roosevelt High School (assoc. HC)
- 1988–1995: Assumption College (assoc. HC)
- 1995–1998: Tennessee State (assoc. HC)
- 1998–2006: Angelo State University
- 2006–2007: The Villages Charter HS
- 2007–2013: Minnesota (Director of Operations)
- 2013–2016: Texas Tech (assistant)
- 2016–2018: Memphis (assoc. HC)
- 2018–2019: UNLV (special assistant to HC)
- 2020–2022: Cesar Chavez HS
- 2022–2026: Kansas City (assoc. HC)
- 2026-present: Saint Marys HS (Head Coach)

Head coaching record
- Overall: (College HC) 118–75 (.611) (High School HC) 47–19 (.712) Overall 165–94 (.637); Games Coached:1020

Accomplishments and honors

Championships
- Northeast-10 Regular Season and Tournament Champions 1990, 1991, 1992 Lone Star Champions 2001

Awards
- 6a Metro Regional Champions 2021 = 2× Lone Star Coach of the Year 2001, 2004, 2x Meto 6A Region Coach of the Year

Records
- NCAA Appearances 8 times (Assumption, ASU, Minnesota, Texas Tech), NIT 3 times, NIT Championship Game (Minnesota), Big10 Championship Game (Minnesota), OVC Championship Game (Tennessee State)

Joseph Esposito (born September 21, 1966) is an American basketball coach. In July 2026 Esposito was named the Head Coach at St. Marys Catholic a top 25 HS program in the country. Before St.Mary’s he was the associate head coach at Division I The University of Missouri KC. He moonlights on the side as a Basketball Analyst on ESPN Las Vegas on his free time. He was the head coach at Cesar Chavez HS in Phoenix, Arizona for two years and before that was an assistant coach for head men's basketball coach Marvin Menzies at the University of Nevada, Las Vegas (UNLV). Esposito spent twelve years with Hall of Fame Coach Tubby Smith as an assistant basketball coach and Recruiting Coordinator at University of Memphis, an assistant coach and Recruiting Coordinator at Texas Tech University and the director of basketball operations and Assistant Coach at the University of Minnesota. He has head coaching experience at Assumption College, Angelo State University and The Villages Charter Schools. He was the associate head coach at Tennessee State University working for Hall of Fame Coach Frankie Allen.

== Coaching career ==
=== Roosevelt High School ===
Esposito's first coaching job came as the assistant basketball coach at FDR in Hyde Park, NY for legendary Hall of fame coach Duane Davis. Esposito also was named assistant AD and assistant baseball coach while serving there for two seasons.

=== Assumption College ===
Esposito was an assistant coach, associate head coach, and head coach at NCAA Division II powerhouse Assumption College in Worcester, Massachusetts. The Greyhounds rattled off three straight Northeast-10 Conference Championships in 1990, 1991 and 1992, and notched a pair of NCAA Division II Tournament regional appearances. The Greyhounds averaged 22 wins a season and no team in the NE-10 has ever won three straight championships like they did. Assumption also set single-season records for wins and winning streaks at the school with Esposito on staff.

=== Tennessee State University ===
Esposito played a vital role at HBCU Tennessee State University as the associate head coach from 1995 to 1998 for head coach Frankie Allen. Esposito was responsible for recruiting three Ohio Valley Conference Freshman of the Year award winners. Only one other school in the nation has had three straight Freshman of the Year award winner Georgia Tech. His 1996-97 and 1997-98 recruiting classes were ranked among the nation's top 30 by Hoop Scoop. He also worked as an academic counselor while at Tennessee State improving their team GPA to over a 3.0 and graduated every player while he was there.

=== Angelo State University ===
Esposito was hired at Angelo State in March 1998 by athletic director Jerry Vandergriff. He took over one of the lowest ranked Division II programs in the Nation. ASU had three straight last place finished and averaged 2 conference wins a season those three years. At Angelo State University, his team recorded 118 wins and left the school with the highest winning percentage of any coach in the program's history.

In his first season at Angelo State in 1999, Esposito posted the best turnaround in Division II by any rookie head coach, improving the Rams' record by seven victories and having the first winning season since 1994. In his second year, he took the Rams to the Lone Star Conference Tournament and wins over nationally ranked Midwestern State and Central Oklahoma. The 2000 season his team posted a 20-win season, which was the second-best record in school history, surpassed only by Esposito's 2001 team that won 24 games.

In 2000–01, in just three season, the Rams advanced to the NCAA Division II Tournament for the first time in 10 years and the third time in school history. Angelo State won the Lone Star Conference South Division Championship with a 22–8 record, which tied the highest single-season win total in school history and 11-1 Conference record best ever in the Lone Star Conference. In addition, Esposito was voted LSC South Coach of the Year in 2001.

In 2002, Esposito led the Rams to its fourth consecutive winning season, the first time ASU had posted four straight winning seasons in two decades. In just four seasons, Esposito led the Rams to three of the top five single season win totals in school history and three straight post-season berths. In 2003, ASU posted its fifth consecutive winning season, a mark only matched one other time in the history of the program. He left the program as one of the winningest coaches in Lone Star Conference history, and graduated 100% of all his four-year players.

=== The Villages Charter School ===
At The Villages Charter High School Esposito helped advance the school to the Class 3A District 7 Final Four for the first time in school history. He built the foundation and buzz in the community which has propelled the program to one of the top high school basketball program in the state, still today.

=== University of Minnesota ===
Esposito was hired by Tubby Smith University of Minnesota on March 29, 2007. Esposito joined Coach Smith at Minnesota on the heels of several disappointing seasons for the Gophers, who had made the NCAA Tournament only once since Monson's hiring in 1999.

In the first season, the team improved from 8–22 in 2006–07 to 20–14 in 2007–08, and reached the Big Ten Tournament semifinals after defeating second-seeded Indiana. In the 2008–09 season, Minnesota had a record of 22–11 and a bid to the NCAA tournament, where the team was eliminated in the opening round. In the 2009–10 season, Smith's team struggled throughout the year, However, in the Big Ten Tournament, the team won three games in three days to advance to Minnesota's first ever appearance in the Big Ten championship game. Though it lost that game, the team's run vaulted it into the NCAA tournament for the second consecutive year.

The 2010–11 the Gophers struggled to maintain the program's momentum, however, finishing 17–14. The 2011–12 Gophers were 19–14 overall. After earning a bid to play in the NIT, the Gophers won four consecutive games before losing in the NIT championship game to Stanford. They concluded the season with a 23–15 overall record, which tied for the most wins in a season in school history.

2013 the Golden Gopher finished the season in the third round of the NCAA Tournament losing to The University of Florida.

=== Texas Tech University ===
On April 6, 2013, Texas Tech Tubby Smith announced the hiring of Joe Esposito as an Assistant Basketball Coach. Texas Tech had failed to make the NCAA tournament in the 7 years prior to Smith's hire at the school.

The first season (2013–2014) proved to be a challenge. The Red Raiders led by Jaye Crockett started the season 8–5 in non conference only to fade during Big 12 play finishing with a 6–12 conference mark. Although the team faded down the stretch, it showed that it could compete with the upper teams in the Big 12 as the Red Raiders won two games against ranked competition and lost many close games. The team finished with a 14–18 record overall and 9th in the 10 team Big 12. This season marked Smith's first losing season as a head coach in his career and proved that the rebuilding job in Lubbock was massive.

The second season started with an incredible recruiting class as they attempted to improve the Red Raiders talent level. They added Keenan Evans, Justin Gray, Norense Odiase, and Zach Smith in the offseason in the hopes of improving a depleted Red Raider team. The Red Raiders had their first victory over a top 25 team since the 2009 season with a January 15, 2014 upset over the #9 Iowa State Cyclones. Although the season started with plenty of promise, the Red Raiders finished a mediocre season with a first round Big 12 tournament exit against the Texas Longhorns.

The 2015–16 season proved to be the best, at Texas Tech, the Red Raiders started the season with a 12–7 record and a 2–6 record in the Big 12. The Red Raiders eventually led a turnaround and won 3 straight games against ranked opponents for the first time in school history. The season featured young stars Evans, Gray, Odiase, and Smith as well as senior leaders Devaugntah Williams and Toddrick Gotcher. The Red Raiders would close out the 2015–16 regular season by winning 6 of their last 8 games and finishing with an overall 19–12 record with a 9–9 record in Big 12 play. The turnaround was the biggest in the Big 12 with the Red Raiders completing a six-game improvement from the year prior in arguably the toughest conference in the country. On March 13, 2016, the Red Raiders were selected to participate in the 2016 NCAA tournament. Tubby Smith was named the Big 12 Coach of the Year for orchestrating the turnaround. On March 8, Smith was named as the Sporting News Coach of the Year for his rebuilding effort.

=== The University of Memphis ===
On April 14, 2016, Smith accepted the head coaching position at Memphis, replacing former Memphis coach Josh Pastner who took the job at Georgia Tech. In April 2017 six of the top eight scorers transferred out of the program. Smith compiled a 22–13 record in his second year at Memphis, improving upon a 19–13 record in his first year. He was fired from the position on March 14, 2018. Smith replaced Josh Pastner who took the job at Georgia Tech. In April 2017, six of the top eight scorers transferred out of the program. A huge rebuild and Memphis signed the top recruiting classes in the Conference in the two seasons they were there. Memphis compiled a 22–13 record in his second year, improving upon a 19–13 record in his first year.

=== UNLV ===
In 2018 UNLV Head Basketball Coach Marvin Menzies hired Esposito as the special assistant to the head coach. The Rebels won 18 games, finished 4th in the Mountain West Conference and Menzies was let go. Menzies went from 11th place to 4th in the Conference. After the news of the firing there was a mass exit of the players leaving for Power 5 schools: Texas Tech, 2 players to Oregon, Baylor, USC and Temple.

=== Cesar Chavez High School ===
Esposito was hired at Cesar Chavez High School in 2020 to rebuild their program after losing the top high school basketball player in the state as well as 7 other players. In year one the Champions went 13–1 with the best record of all levels in Phoenix Union. Year two Chavez once again had the best record of all teams, all levels in Phoenix Union and only lost on game in the region. Two straight Region Championships and Esposito was named Coach of the Year back to back years.

=== University of Missouri Kansas City ===
Esposito was hired by Marvin Menzies on May 2, 2022, as the associate head coach. This will be the second time Esposito and Menzies have worked together. UMKC announced in January 2026 that it would be Menzies last season. All coaching staff, including Esposito, were not retained by new Head Coach Mark Turgeon.

== Media career ==
=== ESPN ===
In 2020 Esposito joined ESPN Las Vegas as a Basketball Analyst and College basketball insider. He is still with ESPN Las Vegas and currently does a weekly show called "Coach Joe Knows". Esposito's currently appears on Fridays at 3:30 pm pacific time.

== Family ==
Esposito is married to former Mary Huglen and has two sons, Jordan and Jacob and two daughters, Shay and Harmony
