= A John Waters Christmas =

Compilation album by various artists
- Released: 2004
- Genre: Christmas music
- Length: 31:14
- Label: New Line Records
- Producer: John Waters

Professional ratings
Review scores
Source	Rating
AllMusic	4/5 stars
The Guardian	3/5 stars

A John Waters Christmas is a compilation album of Christmas music selected by cult film director John Waters.

== Track listing ==
1. "Fat Daddy" – Fat Daddy
2. "Rudolph the Red-Nosed Reindeer" – Tiny Tim
3. "Christmas Time Is Coming" (A Street Carol) – Stormy Weather, originally released in 1975
4. "Happy Birthday Jesus" – Little Cindy, originally released in 1959
5. "Here Comes Fatty Claus" – Rudolph & Gang
6. "Little Mary Christmas" – Roger Christian
7. "I Wish You a Merry Christmas" – Big Dee Irwin & Little Eva
8. "Santa! Don't Pass Me By" – Jimmy Donley
9. "Sleigh Ride" – Alvin and the Chipmunks
10. "Sleigh Bells, Reindeer And Snow" – Rita Faye Wilson, originally released in 1955
11. "First Snowfall" – The Coctails
12. "Santa Claus Is a Black Man" – AKIM & The Teddy Vann Production Company, originally released in 1973
