= WKSG =

WKSG may refer to:

- WKSG (FM), a radio station (98.3 FM) licensed to serve Garrison, Kentucky, United States
- WMFV, a radio station (89.5 FM) licensed to serve Ocala, Florida, United States, which held the call sign WKSG from 1993 to 2018
