= Geography of Prosperity Index =

The Geography of Prosperity Index is a US national-level index ranking 250 cities on "a range of factors that are intended to represent future-readiness for a prosperous life". The Index was created in advance of a book titled The Geography of Prosperity: A New Map of the American Dream (MIT Press, 2027).

== History ==
The index was developed by Bradley Schurman from Human Change and Jaymes Cloninger from Motivf, and was launched at SXSW in March 2026.

== Metrics ==
The index uses five metrics in its rankings: population renewal, climate resilience, automation readiness, social cohesion, and governance and foresight.

== Rankings ==
2026 Geography of Prosperity Index
Rank	City
1	New York City
2	Durham, North Carolina
3	Ann Arbor, Michigan
4	Boston
5	Seattle-Tacoma
6	Washington-Arlington
7	Frederick, Maryland
8	Raleigh, North Carolina
9	Albany-Schenectady
10	San Francisco-Oakland

The Villages in Lady Lake Florida, were ranked last.
