= WMFE =

WMFE may refer to either of two public broadcasting stations in Orlando, Florida, United States:

- WMFE-FM 90.7 MHz, an NPR member radio station
- WUCF-TV channel 24, a PBS member station that previously used the WMFE-TV callsign
