= The Villages Daily Sun =

Newspaper published in The Villages, Florida

- Type: Daily newspaper
- Format: Broadsheet and online
- Owner: Villages Media Management
- Publisher: Dan Sprung
- Editor: Nick Feely
- Founded: 1997
- Headquarters: 984 Old Mill Run; The Villages, Florida 32162, United States
- Circulation: 54,900 Average print circulation
- ISSN: 1528-2821
- OCLC number: 43333479
- Website: www.thevillagesdailysun.com

The Villages Daily Sun is a daily newspaper in The Villages, Florida, USA, which covers issues of local interest to portions of Sumter, Lake and Marion counties in central Florida. According to a report by the Alliance for Audited Media, the Sun's weekday circulation is 48,700 and the newspaper has maintained its print readership, during a time when newspaper circulation around the United States has dropped. The Sun also has a 92 percent market penetration share in the retirement community. In 2026, the Sun was on the list of the 25 largest newspapers in America, ranked by their latest average print circulations.

With the purchase of the Key West Citizen in 2018 by Adams Publishing Group, The Villages Daily Sun became the last family-owned daily newspaper in the state of Florida.

The newspaper is part of a media group that includes AM-640 Radio, Villages News Network TV, and The Villages Magazine.

In early 2021, the yearly subscription was $84 for residents of the community.

== Newspaper strategy ==
The newspaper's strategy is to be a print-first publication, with a recent Sunday issue including a 36-page insert listing the schedules of hundreds of clubs and recreation centers within the Villages, 48 pages of editorial content and 14 pages of classified advertising. The Daily Sun is also bucking the trend by loading its pages with advertisements for real estate, doctors, banks, golf courses, restaurants, and a wide selection of retail outlets.

The Daily Sun has a special projects team that works on more complex issues and in-depth reporting that may take up to a year of investigation before publication. The team had an in-depth feature on Florida's death-penalty sentencing policies in 2016, and the reporting went on to win multiple awards.

== Criticism ==
The Daily Sun's newspaper strategy has been criticized by residents and national media for its lack of coverage of topics of importance to the community. In 2017, over 32 sinkholes were reported in The Villages by media sources, despite The Villages Daily Sun reporting only 14 of those. According to staff, employees have been instructed not to report on sinkholes and "anything complimentary about President Barack Obama". A resident from The Villages who was selected to receive a private audience with Obama at the Democratic National Convention was told by the editor that the encounter was not newsworthy.

== Staff ==
The Daily Sun has an editorial staff of approximately 50, with many reporters in their 20s and 30s. Most reporters and editors do not meet the age requirement of 55 to live in The Villages community, so they live in nearby cities or towns.

== Awards ==
- In February 2019, The Villages Daily Sun won honors in the Associated Press Sports Editors' writing and sections contest for work published in 2018. The newspaper received a Category B Award for Daily Selections and an Honorable Mention for Sunday Selections.
- The Villages Daily Sun was named one of 12 finalists for the World's Best Designed Newspapers (2017)
- The Villages Daily Sun earned nine Inland Press Association national awards, including first place among all newspapers in the Community Leadership Award (2016)
- Top 10 distinction in explanatory writing in the Associated Press Sports Editors national competition - (2016)
- First place in sports reporting in the Society for Professional Journalists' Florida competition (2016)
- Honors for sports reporting and political reporting from the Florida Society of News Editors and five awards for visual journalism, including two first places in information graphics (2016)
- Five Awards of Excellence in the Society for News Design's international competition (2016)
