= Jimmy Donley =

American musician

Jimmy Donley (August 17, 1929 – March 20, 1963) was an American singer-songwriter.

James Kenneth Donley, a native of Gulfport, Mississippi, began his musical career playing in local bars. He served briefly in the Army before being discharged on psychological grounds, then revived his musical career.

Donley wrote many songs, such as "Born To Be A Loser", that went on to be hits by other artists, including Fats Domino and Jerry Lee Lewis. Some of his songs were credited to Rev. J. Charles Jessup, a preacher to whom Donley sold the rights to his output.

Married six times, and prone to bouts of both heavy drinking and domestic violence, Donley saw his musical career decline in the early 1960s. At the age of 33, he committed suicide, by asphyxiating himself with his car's exhaust fumes.

At the time of his death, he was married to Lillie Mae Ugas Donley, who has since died. They are laid to rest next to each other in Saucier, Mississippi.
