= Leave Me Like You Found Me =

- Film poster
- Directed by: Adele Romanski
- Written by: Adele Romanski
- Produced by: John Taylor Feltner
- Starring: Megan Boone; David Nordstrom
- Cinematography: Jay Keitel; James Laxton
- Edited by: Nicole West
- Music by: William Ryan Fritch
- Release date: March 11, 2012 (South by Southwest)
- Running time: 80 minutes
- Country: United States
- Language: English

Leave Me Like You Found Me is a 2012 American romantic drama film written and directed by Adele Romanski and starring Megan Boone and David Nordstrom. It is Romanski's directorial debut.

== Cast ==
- Megan Boone as Erin
- David Nordstrom as Cal
- Patrick Brice as Warren
- Lee Lynch as Tony

== Reception ==
Eric Kohn of IndieWire gave the film a B+.
