= Megan Boone =

American actress

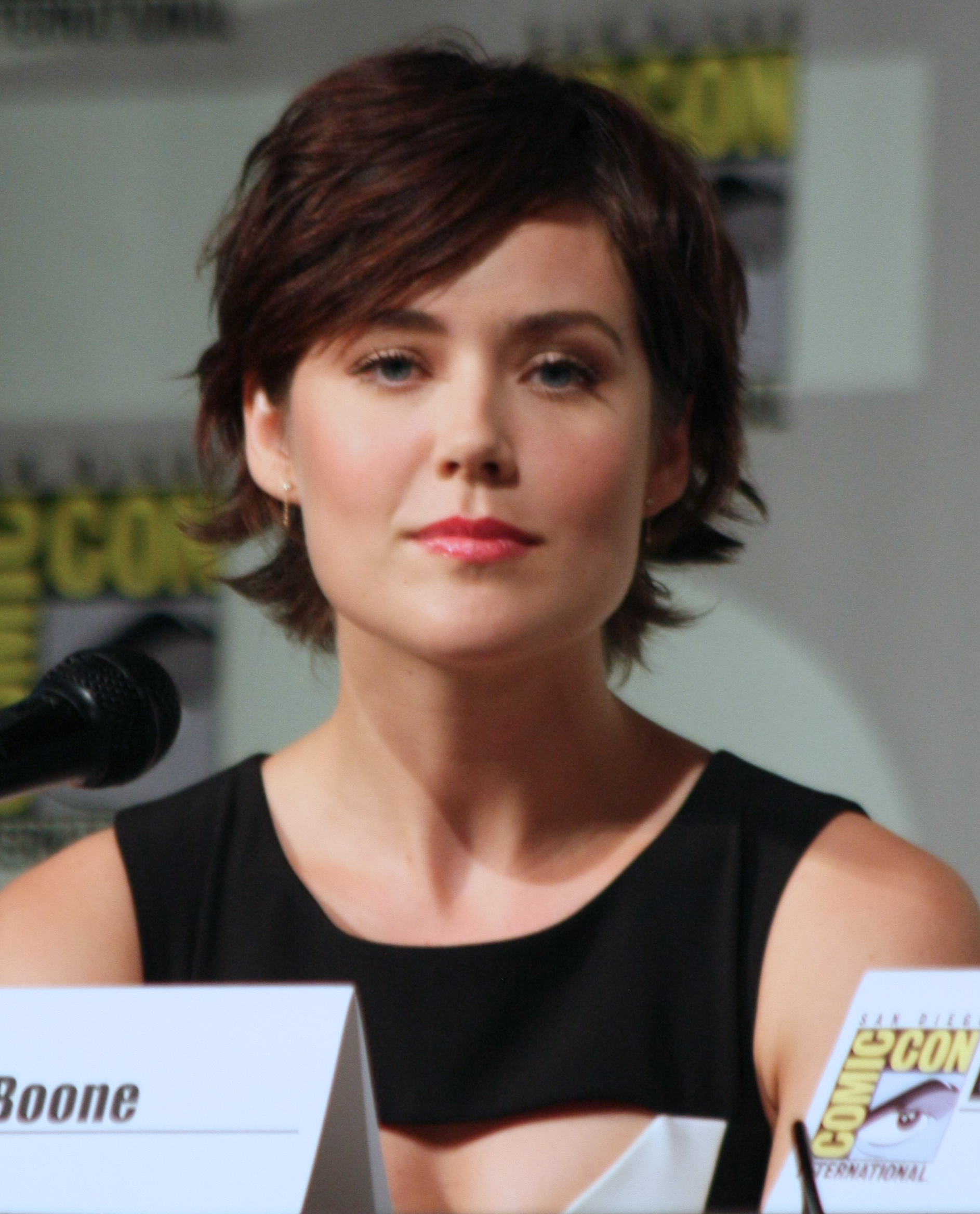
- Boone at the 2013 San Diego Comic-Con
- Born: April 29, 1983 (age 43); Petoskey, Michigan, U.S.
- Occupation: Actress
- Years active: 2001–present
- Known for: The Blacklist
- Partner: Dan Estabrook (m. 2015)
- Children: 1
- Relatives: H. Gary Morse (grandfather); Harold Schwartz (great-grandfather)

Megan Boone (born April 29, 1983) is an American actress and producer. She is best known for her role as FBI agent and profiler Elizabeth Keen on the first eight seasons (2013–2021) of the drama series The Blacklist. Early in her career she appeared in the films My Bloody Valentine 3D (2009) and Step Up Revolution (2012), and had a recurring role in the single season of Law & Order: LA (2010–2011). Since leaving The Blacklist, she has appeared in a 2023 episode of Accused.

== Early life and education ==
Boone was born in Petoskey, Michigan and raised in The Villages, Florida. Her parents relocated there when she was a child to be closer to her grandparents. Her grandfather, H. Gary Morse, was the developer of The Villages; her mother, Jennifer Parr, is the Director of Sales. Boone has a sister named Paige, a brother named Harper and a half-brother named Hudson.

Boone's ancestry is mostly English, German and Jewish (via her maternal grandfather), also Dutch and Irish.

Boone studied acting as a student at a local arts magnet Belleview High School, where she graduated in 2001. In 2005, she graduated from Florida State University's School of Theatre with a Bachelor of Fine Arts (BFA) in Acting. Boone studied with Jane Alexander and Edwin Sherin at the Asolo Repertory Theatre and workshopped with playwright Mark Medoff. In late 2017, Boone began studying for an MBA in Sustainability from Bard College In New York.

== Career ==
Boone produced and starred in the 2007 Los Angeles debut of the Charles L. Mee play Limonade Tous Les Jours and won two LA Weekly Theater Awards for her performance. Boone made her feature film debut in the horror film My Bloody Valentine 3D (2009), followed by a supporting role in Sex and the City 2 in 2010. During 2010, in her year in television, she portrayed Junior Deputy District Attorney Lauren Stanton in the short-lived NBC series Law & Order: LA. That same year, Boone made her directorial debut with the independent film Eggshells for Soil, portions of which were shot in her hometown, The Villages, Florida. She has also appeared in Step Up Revolution (2012), the fourth film in the Step Up series.

Boone stars in the independent drama Leave Me Like You Found Me (2012), for which she won the Gen Art Film Festival Award for Best Actress. She had a recurring role on the CBS police drama series Blue Bloods in 2013, followed by her starring role of FBI agent Elizabeth Keen in the NBC series The Blacklist that year. The Blacklist achieved critical and public success, including good DVR ratings scores. On June 15, 2021, her departure from The Blacklist was announced for season 8, reportedly to pursue other opportunities. She started the production company Weird Sister, signing a first look deal with Sony Pictures Television.

== Personal life ==
Boone is married to artist Dan Estabrook. Their first child was born in April 2016.

In 2017, she became a spokesperson for climate and environmental legislation and used her acting platform to help raise awareness for bills, and to pass laws in her home state of New York such as the Climate Leadership and Community Protection Act and Birds and Bees Protection Act banning the agricultural use of neonicotinoids.

== Filmography ==
=== Film ===
Year	Title	Role	Notes
2009	My Bloody Valentine 3D	Megan	
2010	The Myth of the American Sleepover	Kerri Sullivan	
2010	Eggshells for Soil	Teacher	Also director, writer and producer
2010	Sex and the City 2	Allie	
2012	Step Up Revolution	Claire Asa	
2012	About Cherry	Jake	
2012	Leave Me Like You Found Me	Erin	Gen Art Film Festival Award for Best Actress
2013	Welcome to the Jungle	Lisa	
2013	Family Games	Sloane	Film released in 2018
2026	Internship	Candace Dalton	

=== Television ===
Year	Title	Role	Notes
2008	The Cleaner	Rae	Episode: "Five Little Words"
2008	Cold Case	Helen McCormick '60	Episode: "Wings"
2010	Harvard Medical School	Nell Larson	TV pilot
2010–2011	Law & Order: LA	DDA Lauren Stanton	Recurring role
2013	Blue Bloods	Detective Candice McElroy	2 episodes
2013–2021	The Blacklist	Elizabeth Keen	Series Lead (seasons 1–8)
2014	Robot Chicken	Hannah Horvath / Kelly Garrett / Zira / Angie	2 episodes
2017	The Blacklist: Redemption	Elizabeth Keen	2 episodes
2021	The Underground Railroad	Miss Lucy	1 episode
2023	Accused	Jenny	1 episode
