= J. Charles Jessup =

American televangelist

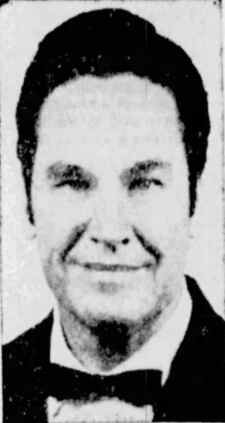
- Publicity photo of Jessup from 1961
- Born: Jack Charles Jessup; March 2, 1916; Gulfport, Mississippi, U.S.
- Died: July 10, 1993 (aged 77); Gulfport, Mississippi, U.S.
- Occupations: Preacher; musician
- Known for: Border blaster religious radio broadcasts

Jack Charles Jessup (March 2, 1916 – July 10, 1993) was an American revival preacher and musician. He claimed and was believed by many to have the gift of healing. Through his border blaster radio broadcasts he became well known nationally and at his peak received more than four thousand letters each day, most containing monetary donations. Dogged throughout his ministry by charges of financial and spiritual fraud, his career was ended by a 1968 mail fraud conviction.

== Biography ==
Jack Charles Jessup was born in 1916 in Gulfport, Mississippi, to Walter and Maude Jessup, as one of nine children. He had six brothers and two sisters. His Pentecostal preacher father was an early disciple of Charles Fox Parham, and used his wife's sickness as an opportunity to cause each of his sons to promise to become gospel preachers. Jessup first began to preach on street corners at the age of twelve. He led his first revival meeting at the age of 14, in a series of meetings that proved so successful that crowds stood outside the meeting church well after the scheduled end date, such that a larger building was built, but still crowds were left outside as the series was extended to the rest of the summer. Jessup claimed his gift of healing was bestowed on him after a multi-day session of prayer and fasting that took place in Tampa, Florida, in 1933. Not long thereafter he was given a tent, purchased from Ringling Brothers, from one of the individuals who believed he had been healed through Jessup. Jessup operated independently from Christian denominations, as the Assemblies of God would not countenance his multiple marriages, and he found the Baptist denomination too restrictive from a financial standpoint. He gained fame through the 1940s as stories spread of his healing, and Oklahoma governor Roy J. Turner invited him to pray over his severely arthritic mother Etta Graham Turner. Turner's belief that she had been healed further added to Jessup's acclaim. However, Jessup was not entirely popular. Town merchants were affected as local cash circulation dwindled as Jessup received large offerings, and local ministers likewise saw a significant decrease in their offerings when Jessup was in town. Accordingly, these two groups often joined together in convincing local law enforcement to encourage Jessup to find other communities for his meetings. In particular, the Churches of Christ developed enmity towards Jessup, believing that all modern miracles were a form of heresy.

In mid 1947 Jessup was in the final planning stages (the idea first occurring to him in 1942) to broadcast sermons on Mexican border blaster radio, eventually utilizing station XERF which was widely heard across North America. Jessup, his wife and brothers incorporated the Fellowship Revival Association in Fort Worth, Texas, as an umbrella organization for their personal appearances and radio work. His radio show was highly successful, at his peak he received more than four thousand letters each day, requesting prayer and healing, and usually containing monetary donations. The success of the XERF broadcasts prompted Jessup to buy time on another border blaster, XEG, and Jessup's preaching was now available through most of North America twelve times a week. Soon he added stations in the key markets of Chicago and New York City to ensure maximum radio exposure. A 1954 federal grand jury recommended the FBI assist in further investigating Jessup's activities, which included $14,000 a week in bank deposits. Jessup's accounting system was non-existent, and although the Internal Revenue Service (IRS) conducted three formal investigations, he was never convicted, largely because most of the income was in the form of small cash. By the mid-1950s he claimed responsibility for the conversion of 200,000 individuals.

Through their broadcasting and tent revivals, the Jessup brothers and Charles in particular became wealthy. As his fame and wealth increased, his fiddle player Murphy "Pee Wee" Maddux (sometimes spelled "Maddox") became his closest associate. He built his dream house next to Jefferson Davis' last residence in Biloxi, Mississippi.

Although the FBI and IRS were never able to convict Jessup, an investigation begun in 1962 by Charles Miller and Oris Whitley of the Medical Fraud Unit of the United States Postal Inspection Service had a different outcome. Jessup was arrested, along with his ex-wife Rose and associate Pee Wee Maddux, in 1964 on eleven counts of mail fraud, false statements regarding his divorces and bigamy, which he vigorously denied. Jessup's bond was set at $100,000. James F. Neal acted as prosecutor. Originally set to be tried in Nashville, the case was moved to Mississippi upon Jessup's request as he felt he would not receive a fair trial in Nashville because of the influence of the Churches of Christ in that area. Pee Wee Maddux turned State's witness in 1967, and although he avoided jail time he regretted for years afterwards what he felt was his betrayal of Jessup. Charles Jessup, believing he would avoid jail time, pled nolo contendere on two charges in March 1968. He was convicted on these charges in December 1968, and to Jessup's astonishment was sentenced to a year's imprisonment, $2,000 in fines, and five years' subsequent probation during which any self-promotion was prohibited by judge Dan Monroe Russell Jr., who in his sentencing statement lambasted Jessup's hypocrisy. March 1969 saw Jessup report to the Federal Correctional Institution, Texarkana.

Jessup was released from prison after one year and one day, and moved to Natchez, Mississippi, with his wife Nita. He found employment as a property caretaker. Jessup was so terrified of being sent back to prison that he never again preached in the United States, and was unwilling to even pray in public. He moved to be close to his brother Jimmie in Arlington, Texas, and became a car salesman, eventually purchasing a small dealership. At this time he began preaching again in Mexico to the imprisoned.

Jessup died July 10, 1993, in Gulfport, at the time of death his residence was Saucier, Mississippi. He felt until the time of his death that his human side had been the cause of many failures, but that he had been genuinely used by God.

== Personal life ==
Jessup married at least four times. Jessup was first married at the age of 17. The marriage proved disastrous, as his bride was highly reluctant about sexuality, while Jessup described his own sexual appetite as "insatiable". Obtaining a marriage dissolution in Iowa, he entered a second unsuccessful marriage at the age of 19. His second wife did not enjoy the life of an itinerant preacher, and although pregnant she left Jessup soon after. He married third wife Rose Oden at the age of 25, proposing to the seventeen-year-old three days after meeting her when she agreed to be a substitute pianist at his revival, the ceremony taking place five weeks after the proposal. This marriage was far more successful than the first two, as Rose enjoyed the traveling lifestyle and actively assisted her husband on the piano and accordion. Jessup obtained a Mexican divorce from Rose, without her knowledge, in 1962, an action Jessup later blamed on the stress of the Postal Service investigation. He married 15-year-old Nita Uribe while still married (in the United States) to his third wife, an indictment that was part of the criminal charges of which he was ultimately convicted. He remained married to Nita until the time of his death.

Jessup spent a great deal of time and money breeding birds for cockfighting, as well as betting on matches, to the point that his family considered it an addiction. He was known to get so excited during a cockfight that he would bet against his own bird. His interest in cockfighting brought him into close association with Harry Bennett of the Dixie Mafia. Other interests that expanded Jessup's social circle beyond traditional Christian groups were cigars and "wild music".

== Presentation style ==
Jessup's revival meetings consisted of "old-fashioned" preaching and "faith-healing" sessions, which could at times be clamorous. His meetings often included demonstrations of significant physical strength. His sermons effectively utilized pathos and humor, transposing complex theology into simple stories. His delivery was rapid fire, with quick intakes of breaths in a manner that earned him the nickname 'The Great Gaspy'. These programs were introduced by his theme song "Look Away to Heaven", played by Rose Jessup. At some point in his sermon he usually gave manic, rapid-fire promises of healing, followed by promises of prayer presented in a much gentler manner. Recordings often took place in marathon sessions, with several months of programs recorded on electrical transcriptions in a short time-span, which were then mailed to the stations studios in Del Rio for broadcast.

Jessup's program was entitled The Old-fashioned Gospel Program, and featured western swing gospel music presented by the Jessup Brothers, along with frenetic sermons often recorded earlier at his tent revival meetings, interspersed with frequent pleadings for funds presented in a much more low-key fashion. In exchange for the "freewill donations", Jessup promised to include the giver's petitions in his "all-night prayer vigils", and that his prayers had resulted in the cure of maladies such as blindness, deafness and leprosy.

He claimed that those "born of God" were incapable of sin.

== Controversies ==
Jessup sued in 1940, for slander, the superintendent of the Assembly of God Oklahoma district.

Jessup stirred controversy even before his broadcasting career began. An assault and battery criminal case was brought against him and his brother Darrel by fellow evangelist Edgar Bishop. Bishop also filed a civil case against Jessup stating that although Bishop had originally joined the Jessups to "assist in spreading the gospel", Bishop became alarmed at the cynicism with which the Jessups collected often substantial offerings. He further claimed that the Jessups were anticipating a great financial windfall from their soon-starting radio operations, anticipating a monthly income of $90,000 from an annual expenditure of $21,000. Bishop claimed he had a business relationship with the Jessups, including loaning them funds to set up the planned Mexican radio operations, but deciding he "didn't like their methods", he called the loan, and that the Jessups refused to repay him. The Jessups denied each of the criminal and civil charges. This trial was delayed when Bishop was arrested on a separate warrant charging him with "obtaining money under false pretenses." More than 300 Jessup supporters disrupted some of the court proceedings.

Jessup and his Fellowship Revival Association found further legal trouble in 1948, when he, his wife, father and brothers were sued in the amount of $100,000 by a woman who claimed to have worked for the Jessup organization as a secretary who opened mail containing contributions to the radio show. She claimed that as they exited a theater in Gulfport the Jessup group physically attacked her daughter, and then herself as she attempted to intervene, leaving the claimants irreparably injured. These charges were vigorously denied, as the Jessups stated that they were not at the location where the attack occurred, and also denied the claimant had been employed by them at any point. The defense further cast aspersion regarding the morals of the defendants. A criminal case regarding the matter was never brought forth as the claimants refused to press charges or be interviewed by investigators. The suit posited that the Jessups were generating an income of $1,380 per day through their radio program, which was described as a "sham" designed for the personal enrichment of the defendants. The Jessups maintained these figures were incorrect and that the actual daily intake varied from less than $100 to a maximum of $239. Ultimately, a jury awarded $5,000 to the claimant.

A 1954 Churches of Christ editorial stated that Jessup was considered the leading exponent of "faith-healing", but accused him of fraud and profiting luxuriously from the misery of others. The editorial detailed a Federal investigation into Jessup's financial dealings and further made vague allegations regarding Jessup's sexuality. Although Jessup maintained that his salary was a mere $75 a week, he lived luxuriously and owned several expensive air, land and sea vehicles.

In his radio program he promised to pray for those who sent him letters, while at the same time encouraging those who wrote to also include some financial remuneration. He received far more mail than he could individually pray for, and to his own satisfaction he solved this dilemma by praying over a few pieces of mail individually, and then praying over the remaining stacks of letters.

== Cultural representations ==
Robert Duvall based his character's sermons and preaching style on Jessup's in the 1997 film The Apostle.

== The Jessup Brothers ==
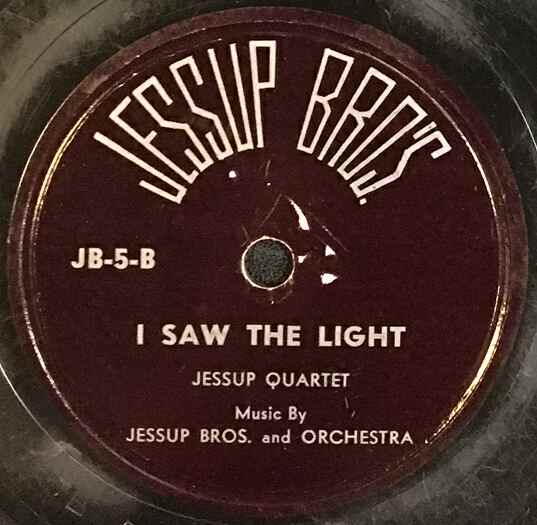
Jessup Brothers 78rpm label, singing "I Saw The Light"

The Jessup Brothers were a gospel group with five to seven members, consisting of various Jessup Brothers plus Pee Wee Maddux, who performed religious music in the western-swing style. In 1951 they campaigned for Sam Lumpkin. They were represented by agent Dallas Turner in association with Harold Schwartz. In addition to their singing, they were known for their instrumental prowess, and in 1957 member Darrel Jessup custom ordered a guitar billed as "one of the most radical guitars of all time", which was later owned by Charles. Members included:

- Byron Jessup – banjo
- Darrel Jessup – lead vocals, lead guitar.
- Jimmie Jessup – emcee
- Ted Jessup – vocals
- Pee Wee Maddux – fiddle
