= Santa Claus Is a Black Man =

1973 Christmas single

Single by Akim and the Teddy Van Production Company
- B-side: "A Natural Santa"
- Written: November 1973
- Released: 1973
- Genre: Soul
- Length: 3:27
- Label: Simtone
- Songwriter: Teddy Vann
- Producer: Teddy Vann

"Santa Claus Is a Black Man" is a Christmas song by record producer and songwriter Teddy Vann, performed by his daughter Akim Vann (billed as Akim) and his Teddy Vann Production Company for a 1973 single. The song, described as "Vann's take on 'I Saw Mommy Kissing Santa Claus'", has been called a cult classic, and continues to receive Christmas airplay.

The elder Vann wrote the song as a Christmas gift for Akim, then five years old, who performs vocals on the recording. A soul song, the lyrics describe Akim happening upon her mother and Santa Claus dancing, noting Santa's curious resemblance to her father. The elder Vann was active in mentoring children, and intended the song to provide positive imagery and empowerment for young African-Americans; the song also makes reference to the Kwanzaa holiday, which the elder Vann was active in promoting in his native Brooklyn.

Vann would later become better known for co-writing "Power of Love/Love Power" with Luther Vandross in 1991, for which he won a Grammy Award.

Film director John Waters included the song on his 2004 Christmas music collection, A John Waters Christmas, despite the wishes of the elder Vann, who rejected Waters's request because the auteur "is not considered mainstream". Vann filed suit against Waters for using the song without permission.
