= Dan Estabrook =

American photographer (born 1969)

- Born: 1969 (age 56–57); Boston, Massachusetts, U.S.
- Education: Harvard University (BA, 1990); University of Illinois at Urbana-Champaign (MFA, 1993)
- Known for: Photography
- Spouse: Megan Boone
- Children: 1
- Awards: National Endowment for the Arts Fellowship (1994)
- Website: danestabrook.com

Dan Estabrook (born 1969) is an American photographer. He received an artist's fellowship from the National Endowment for the Arts in 1994. His photographs are in the permanent collections of the Art Institute of Chicago and the North Carolina Museum of Art, which presented a mid-career retrospective spanning 30 years of his practice in 2024.

== Early life and education ==
Estabrook was born in 1969 in Boston, Massachusetts. He earned a Bachelor of Arts degree from Harvard University in 1990, where he studied alternative photographic techniques with Christopher James, and completed a Master of Fine Arts at the University of Illinois at Urbana–Champaign in 1993. During and after graduate school, he studied post-mortem photography.

== Career ==
Seeing the exhibition The Waking Dream: Photography's First Century at the Metropolitan Museum of Art in 1993 strongly influenced Estabrook's approach to historical processes. In 1994, soon after completing his graduate studies, Estabrook received an artist's fellowship from the National Endowment for the Arts.

His work has been exhibited at institutions including the North Carolina Museum of Art, the Halsey Institute of Contemporary Art, and the University of Kentucky Art Museum. In 2024, the North Carolina Museum of Art organized Forever and Never: Photographs by Dan Estabrook, a retrospective covering 30+ years of his work. The exhibition examined Estabrook's use of photographic history and material experimentation, and ran from September 2024 through January 2025.

Estabrook has taught photography and visual studies at several institutions. He has been a Visiting Assistant Professor at Pratt Institute, visiting artist at Lesley University, and instructor at the Penland School of Craft.

== Artistic practice ==
Nine Symptoms, no. 9: Euphoria (2004), salt print with watercolor and ink

Estabrook is part of a broader movement of photographers returning to historical processes. He works with early photographic processes, including calotypes, salt prints, tintypes, ambrotypes, and albumen prints, which he adapts to create contemporary images.

His photographs often include hand-painted or drawn elements and combine found and original imagery. He hand-paints with gouache and watercolor to alter subjects and uses rust as an additional material element. Rather than simply accepting the flaws inherent in antique processes, Estabrook deliberately cultivates imperfections, stains, and signs of deterioration to create a sense of temporal distance. He incorporates cloth as a recurring motif, drawing on its various uses in early photography as backdrop, shroud, or classical drapery.

Estabrook's inspirations include anonymous photographs collected from flea markets, 19th-century post-mortem photography, and late-19th-century medical books. His 2004 series Nine Symptoms uses the calotype and salt print processes alongside the visual language of 19th-century medical photography to explore the physical experience of falling in love.

== Critical reception ==
Estabrook has been described as working at "the cutting edge of the antiquarian avant-garde," referencing the "stiff, stagey quality of 19th-century photography" while capturing "the sense of magic and mystery evident in early works" by pioneers like William Henry Fox Talbot.

While many artists have experimented with early photographic processes, Estabrook creates "cryptic, compelling imagery" that balances nostalgic form with "a peculiarly playful and contemporary edge". Critics have noted his willingness to approach historical photography with humor and irreverence, distinguishing his conceptual approach from more technically purist practitioners. His photographs become "lost objects" onto which viewers project their own sentiments.

His practice addresses memory, time, and the physical nature of the photograph. His work has been described as a dialogue between photography's past and its shift in the digital era.

== Publications ==
- Forever and Never: Photographs by Dan Estabrook. Artsuite. 2024. ISBN 979-8-89443-361-5.

== Personal life ==
Estabrook has a background in skateboarding and created zines before pursuing photography. He has described his artistic practice as rooted in the DIY ethic of punk rock and skateboarding.

He lives in Carroll Gardens. He is married to actress Megan Boone. They have one daughter.
