= WaterTower Music =

American record label

WaterTower Music Inc.
- Parent company: Warner Bros. Entertainment
- Founded: 2000; 26 years ago
- Founder: Jason Linn
- Genre: Various
- Country of origin: United States
- Location: Burbank, California
- Official website: watertower-music.com

WaterTower Music Inc. (formerly New Line Records from 2000 to 2010) is an American record label serving as the Warner Music Group in-house music label run by entertainment company Warner Bros.. The name and logo are based on the iconic Warner Bros. Water Tower.

== History ==
It was founded in 2000 as New Line Records by Jason Linn. New Line Records initially signed several rock and pop artists, like with the record labels owned by Time Warner's music division Warner Music Group. It also released soundtrack albums for films from its namesake Warner-studio New Line Cinema, with these albums including songs from artists signed to New Line Records. Artists signed to the label included Swedish indie band The Sounds, American indie bands Paris, Texas, Midnight Movies, Robbers on High Street, trip hop artist The Angel, country singer Allison Moorer, synthpop band Echo, R&B band IMx and metal band The Blank Theory. The Angel composed the soundtrack for the 2000 New Line film Boiler Room, with her 2001 album No Gravity and the soundtrack for this film both being released on New Line Records. Director John Waters, who released many of his films through New Line, was behind a 2004 Christmas album for New Line Records, titled A John Waters Christmas. Waters' 2004 New Line film A Dirty Shame also had a soundtrack album release by New Line Records that same year.

In November 2003, it was announced that Time Warner were selling Warner Music Group to private investors, with the deal being finalized early the following year. New Line Records and its catalog were not part of the sale, as New Line Records was owned by New Line Cinema itself, rather than by Warner Music Group. Time Warner also retained the pre-2004 soundtracks for Warner Bros. Pictures films. In early 2008, New Line Cinema stopped operating as an independent division of Time Warner, and became a label of Warner Bros. Pictures. New Line's film, music and television operations were merged into the wider Warner Bros. Entertainment umbrella. On January 15, 2010, New Line Records changed its name to WaterTower Music with Linn now also reporting to Paul Broucek the president of music at Warner Bros. Pictures. Following the name change, the label stopped focusing on releasing music by rock and pop artists, becoming a label solely dedicated to releasing soundtracks for Warner films and shows. The label also holds the rights to soundtrack albums released on MGM Records (which went defunct in 1982), as Time Warner gained the rights to MGM's pre-May 1986 film library in 1996. However, the rights to the non-film related albums released on MGM Records are controlled by Universal Music Group.

In March 2010, the label switched distribution from Warner Music Group's Alternative Distribution Alliance to Fontana, Universal Music Group's independent distributor.

In 2019, the distribution changed back to ADA, effectively reuniting WMG with former parent Warner Bros.

Warner Bros. Discovery CEO David Zaslav was considering selling the company's music assets in early 2023, as part of his aggressive cost-cutting measures. However, the sale was called off after failing to attract an expected sale price of around $2 billion. The best offers were instead at the $1.2 billion to $1.3 billion mark. Potential buyers' offers were lower than expected due to stipulations in negotiations that Warner Bros. Discovery retain control over how certain valuable soundtracks are used.

== WaterTower Music Artists ==
- Hans Zimmer
- Junkie XL aka Tom Holkenborg
- Howard Shore
- Benson Taylor
- Ryan Shore
- Alan Silvestri
- Ramin Djawadi
- Lorne Balfe
- Steven Price
- Ludwig Göransson
- John Powell
- Daniel Pemberton
- Andrew Lockington
- Michael Giacchino
- Thomas Newman
- Danny Elfman
- Joseph Bishara
- Christophe Beck
- Alexandre Desplat
- Rupert Gregson-Williams
- John Debney
- Mychael Danna
- Jeff Danna
- Mark Mothersbaugh
- James Horner
- Max Richter
- John Murphy
- Benjamin Wallfisch

== See also ==
- Lists of record labels
- Warner Records
- Warner Sunset Records
