= The Villages Charter High School =

Charter School located in The Villages, Florida

The Villages Charter High School is a charter school serving the community and surrounding areas of The Villages, Florida. In 2024, the school had about 1300 students. It is part of The Villages Charter Schools. The Villages High School is located at 2210 Dr Randy McDaniel Way, Middleton, FL 34762.

== Academics ==
=== Academies ===
Students entering their Junior year are required to select an academy that allows them to study in a major area of interest and can lead to professional certifications in the chosen field. Currently there are 7 academies to choose from:

1. Advanced Studies (Advanced Placement and Dual Enrollment)
2. Communication (TV Production or Journalism)
3. Engineering
4. Entrepreneurship (Graphic Arts or Culinary Arts)
5. Fine Arts (Art, Dance, or Music)
6. Information Technology
7. Health Sciences

=== Dual Enrollment ===
The Villages High School offers 79 credit hours of college courses through Lake–Sumter State College. Students are capable of earning an Associate of Arts degree by the time they graduate from the high school.

=== Advanced Placement ===
The Villages High School offers 7 Advanced Placement (AP) courses. The courses offered are (grade offered):

1. Music Theory (11–12)
2. Physics (11–12)
3. Language & Comp (11–12)
4. World History (10)
5. US History (11)
6. Government (12)
7. Statistics (12)

== Athletics ==
The school mascot is the Buffalo. The Villages High School offers 24 varsity sports. The school competes as a member of the Florida High School Athletic Association. Starting in 2014, The Villages High School has hosted the Battle at The Villages tournament. The school has also hosted the 2014 FACA North-South All-Star Football Classic.
