= Adele Romanski =

American film producer

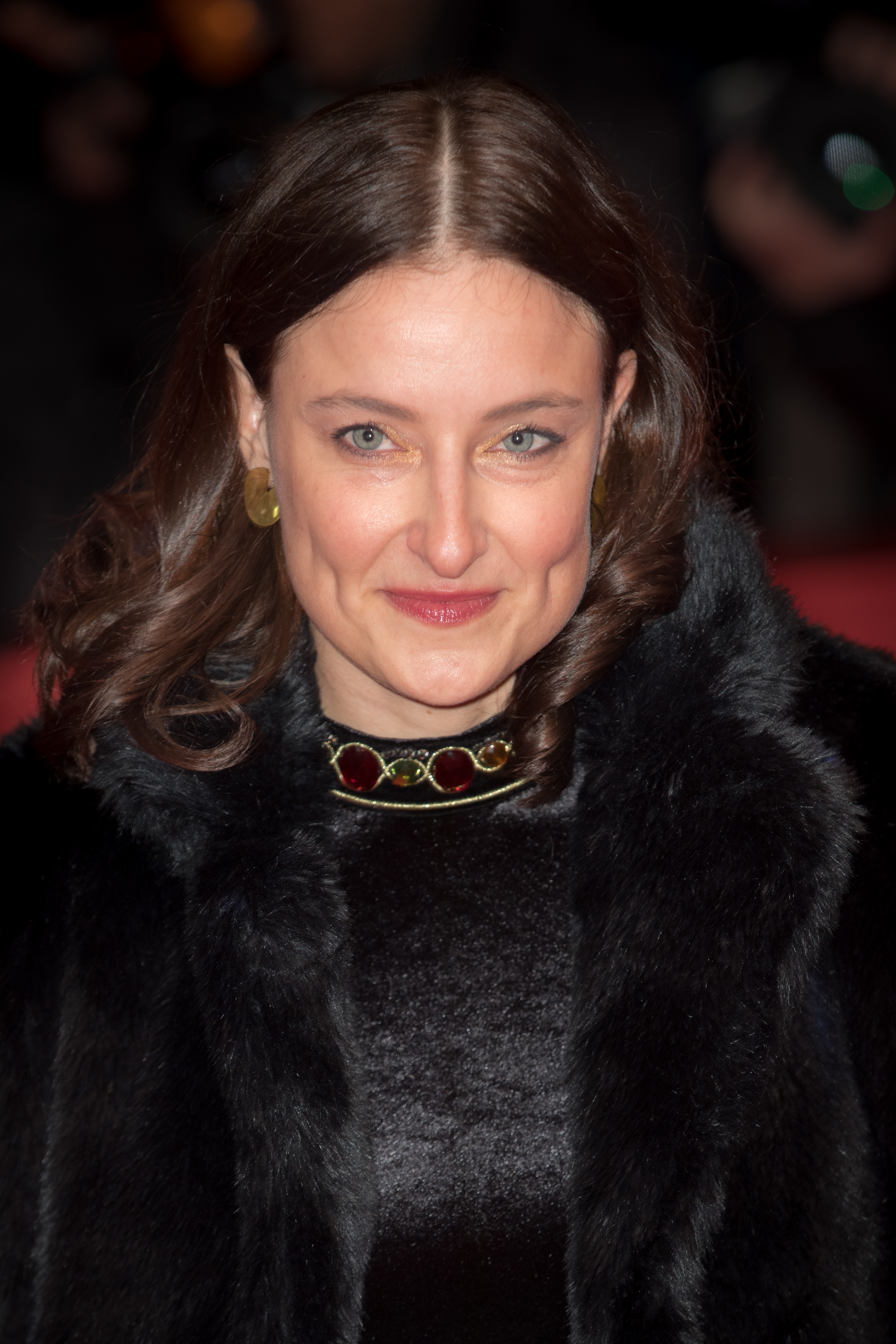
- Romanski at the 2018 Berlin International Film Festival
- Born: Adele Marie Romanski; November 10, 1982 (age 43); Sarasota, Florida, U.S.
- Education: Florida State University (BFA)
- Occupation: Film producer
- Years active: 2006–present

Adele Marie Romanski (/əˈdeɪlə roʊˈmænskiː/; born November 10, 1982) is an American independent film producer. She is best known for producing the acclaimed films Moonlight, Never Rarely Sometimes Always, and Aftersun. Moonlight received eight Oscar nominations at the 89th Academy Awards, winning Best Picture for Romanski, along with Dede Gardner and Jeremy Kleiner.

== Personal life ==
Romanski grew up in Venice, Florida. She graduated from Pine View School in 2001, later graduating from Florida State University in 2004. She attended FSU with director Barry Jenkins.

She was married to Academy Award nominated cinematographer James Laxton, who has worked on several of the films she produced.

== Career ==
In January 2017 it was announced Romanski would be an executive producer on season 2 of The Girlfriend Experience. She produced Under the Silver Lake, which was released in 2018. She was instrumental in instigating Barry Jenkins' sophomore feature, Moonlight, including getting him to decide on concepts, scouting locations and recommending Mahershala Ali for the role of Juan. She won the Academy Award for Best Picture for producing the 2016 film Moonlight.

In addition to producing, Romanski has also written and directed the 2012 film Leave Me Like You Found Me.

In February 2018, she was selected to be on the jury for the main competition section of the 68th Berlin International Film Festival.

== Filmography ==
=== Film ===
Year	Film	Director	Other notes
2010	The Myth of the American Sleepover	David Robert Mitchell	Nominated—Independent Spirit Awards Producers Award
2010	The Freebie	Katie Aselton	
2012	Black Rock	Katie Aselton	
2012	Leave Me Like You Found Me	Adele Romanski	Directorial Debut
2013	Bad Milo!	Jacob Vaughan	
2014	War Story	Mark Jackson	Co-producer
2016	Kicks	Justin Tipping	
2016	Morris from America	Chad Hartigan	U.S. Dramatic Competition—2016 Sundance Film Festival
2016	Moonlight	Barry Jenkins	Academy Award for Best Picture; BIFA for Best Foreign Independent Film; Golden Globe Award for Best Motion Picture – Drama; Independent Spirit Award for Best Film; Nominated—BAFTA Award for Best Film; Nominated—Producers Guild of America Award for Best Theatrical Motion Picture
2017	Gemini	Aaron Katz	
2018	Under the Silver Lake	David Robert Mitchell	
2018	If Beale Street Could Talk	Barry Jenkins	Independent Spirit Award for Best Film
2020	Never Rarely Sometimes Always	Eliza Hittman	
2022	Aftersun	Charlotte Wells	
2023	All Dirt Roads Taste of Salt	Raven Jackson	
2024	Mufasa: The Lion King	Barry Jenkins	
2025	Sorry, Baby	Eva Victor	
2025	Preparation for the Next Life	Bing Liu	

=== Television ===
Year	Title	Notes
2017	The Girlfriend Experience	Season 2
2021	The Underground Railroad	Limited series BAFTA TV Award for Best International Programme; Golden Globe Award for Best Limited or Anthology Series or Television Film; Nominated—Primetime Emmy Award for Outstanding Limited or Anthology Series; Nominated—Independent Spirit Award for Best New Scripted Series; Nominated—Producers Guild of America Award for Best Limited Series Television
