= The Villages Charter Schools =

Charter school in Villages, Florida, United States

Location
- 2210 Dr Randy McDaniel Way; Middleton, Florida 34762; United States

Information
- Type: Charter school
- Established: 1999
- School district: Sumter District Schools
- Principal: Teri Mattson
- Teaching staff: 214.10 (FTE)
- Grades: Pre-kindergarten – 12
- Gender: Co-ed
- Enrollment: 3,473 (2022-2023)
- Student to teacher ratio: 16.22
- Colors: Green and Gold
- Mascot: Buffalo
- Nickname: VHS
- Graduates: 96%
- Website: tvcs.org

The Villages Charter Schools (VCS) is a state-operated charter school in The Villages CDP in unincorporated Sumter County, Florida, United States. Children are eligible to attend the school if either of their parents work for The Villages.

The school is located on several campuses. The administration is located at 2210 Dr Randy McDaniel Way, Middleton, FL 34762. The Little Buffalo Learning Center which houses Pre-K 1 and Pre-K 2 is located at 560 Fieldcrest Drive. The Villages Early Childhood Center which house Pre-K 3 and Pre-K 4 is located at 510 Old School Road. The Primary Center, which houses Kindergarten and 1st grade of The Villages Charter Elementary School, is located at 420 Village Campus Circle. The Intermediate Center, which houses 2nd and 3rd grades of The Villages Charter Elementary School, is located at 521 Old School Road. The 4th and 5th Grade Center which houses 4th and 5th grades of The Villages Charter Elementary School is located at 350 Tatonka Terrace. The Villages Charter Middle School is located at 450 Village Campus Circle. The Villages Charter High School is located at 251 Buffalo Trail.

== History ==
Sumter District Schools granted permission to create the charter school in September 1999. Groundbreaking began in October of that year. The elementary school opened in 2000. The dedication of the middle school was on August 30, 2001. In November of that year the early childhood program began. The Primary Center opened in August 2002. The original elementary building took grades 3 through 5, while the new building took Kindergarten through Grade 2. The groundbreaking ceremony for the high school took place in October 2002. The high school opened in August 2003.

== School shooting plot ==
On January 26, 2017, two male students at The Villages Middle School, a 13-year-old and a 14-year-old, were escorted from lunch by the police then arrested at their homes and charged with conspiracy to commit murder. Law enforcement and school officials had followed up on rumors and discovered that some students had been warned not to come to school on Friday. In interviewing the 13-year-old suspect, officials learned of the 14-year-old's involvement. The 14-year-old student acknowledged his involvement in conversations with the 13-year-old student while referencing the Columbine High School shooting. The student informed officials that the two students had planned an attack which included what they would use as a signal to begin shooting. Law enforcement officials found firearms at both the students' homes.

== School uniforms ==
Students from Kindergarten through 12th grade are required to wear school uniforms.

== Enrollment ==
Enrollment Guidelines: There are three groups of families whose children are eligible for enrollment in The Villages Charter School:

- Children who have a parent who is a direct employee of The Villages.
- Children who have a parent who is an employee of a direct (first-tier) subcontractor of The Villages. The employee must receive a Form W-2 from the sub-contractor, not a Form 1099. Lower-tier subcontractors (i.e., those who do not have a direct contract with The Villages) or subcontractors hired and paid by residents or businesses of The Villages do not qualify.
- Children who have a parent who is an employee of a business operating within The Villages.

Although there are three designated "family units" within The Villages, students living in those areas do not automatically qualify for enrollment; they must meet one of the three criteria listed above.

The School verifies eligibility monthly.
