= Sumter District Schools =

School district in Florida, United States

Location
- 2680 West County Road 476; Bushnell, FL 33513

District information
- Motto: Preparing the Next Generation Today
- Grades: Pre-K−12
- Superintendent: Logan W. Brown
- Accreditation: Florida Department of Education
- Schools: 13
- NCES District ID: 1201800

Students and staff
- Students: 8836
- Staff: 518
- Student–teacher ratio: 17.04

Other information
- Website: www.sumter.k12.fl.us

Sumter District Schools is a public school district that covers Sumter County, Florida. The district has its headquarters in Bushnell, Florida.

== School Board ==
Members as of 2020-2021

Chairperson: David A. Williams

Vice Chairperson: Sally Moss

- District 1 - Sally Moss
- District 2 - Brett Sherman
- District 3 - David A. Williams
- District 4 - Russell Hogan
- District 5 - Kathie L. Joiner

== Schools ==
=== High schools ===
- South Sumter High School (Raider)
- Wildwood Middle High School (Wildcat)

=== Middle schools ===
- South Sumter Middle School
- Wildwood Middle High School

=== Elementary schools ===
- Bushnell Elementary School
- Lake Panasoffkee Elementary School
- Webster Elementary School
- Wildwood Elementary School

=== Charter schools ===
- The Villages Charter Schools

=== Specialty schools ===
- Sumter P.R.E.P. Academy
