= WVLG =

Coordinates: 28°54′16.9″N 81°57′35.3″W

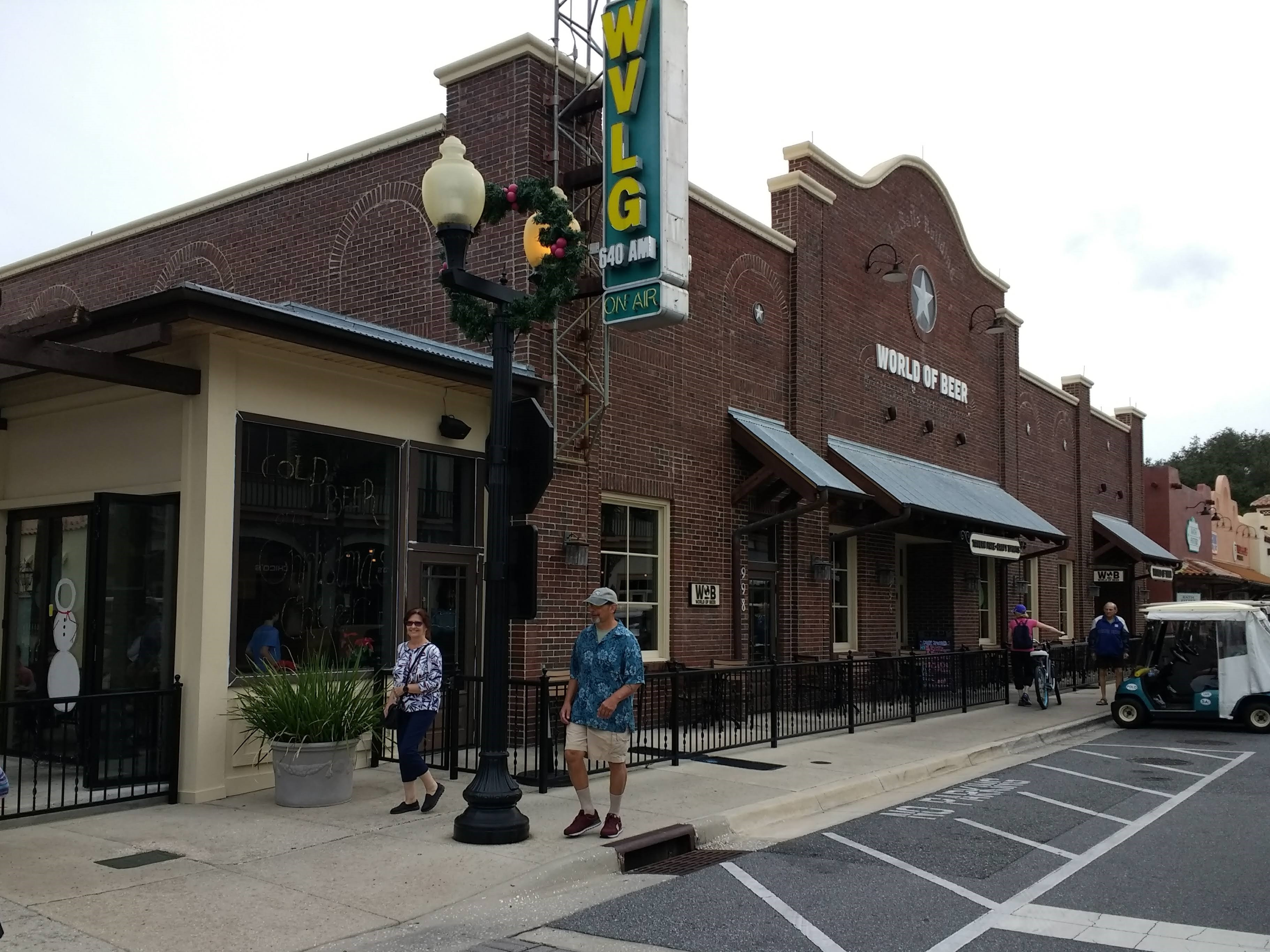
- WVLG's studios in the Spanish Springs Square of The Villages
- Wildwood, Florida; United States
- Broadcast area: The Villages
- Frequency: 640 kHz

Programming
- Format: Classic hits
- Affiliations: Fox News Radio

Ownership
- Owner: Village Communications

History
- First air date: 1986
- Former call signs: WHOF (1986–1988); WMZY (1988); WHOF (1988–2000)
- Call sign meaning: The Villages

Technical information
- Licensing authority: FCC
- Facility ID: 70724
- Class: B
- Power: 930 watts (day); 860 watts (night)
- Translators: 102.7 W274BR (The Villages); 104.5 W283DK (Wildwood)

Links
- Public license information: Public file; LMS
- Webcast: Listen live
- Website: www.thevillagesdailysun.com/links/wvlg/

WVLG (640 AM) is a commercial radio station licensed to Wildwood, Florida, United States, and serving The Villages It is owned by Village Communications and airs a full service classic hits format. World and national news is provided by Fox News Radio.

By day, WVLG broadcasts at 930 watts, reducing power at night to 860 watts It uses a non-directional antenna at all times The station is also heard on two FM translator stations: W274BR 102.7 MHz in the northern part of the listening area and W283DK 104.5 in the southern part.

== History ==
In 1986, the station signed on as WHOF. It was owned by Walker Heart of Florida Broadcasting, and the station was licensed in Wildwood, Florida but had a studio in Leesburg, Florida In 1987, the station was sold to Jim Patrick, operated as WMZY, and played Contemporary Christian music It changed to WHOF in 1988 and offered Christian talk and teaching programming.

In 2001 the station was purchased by the Senior Broadcasting Corporation For a time it concentrated on Adult Standards music, but in the 2000s, the focus switched to Soft Oldies of the 1960s, '70s, and '80s As of 2002, WVLG played "a lot more Paul Simon and Bruce Springsteen than Frank Sinatra and Duke Ellington."

In 2011, the station was sold for $750,000 to Villages Communications.

Steve Rosen, who took over programming WVLG in 2020, said in 2025 that when he took over he changed the music to "a kind of a Classic Rock meets Oldies meets Yacht Rock". The music comes from the 60s through the 90s and Rosen said most of the Villages residents, ages 55 and up, listen to the station. He also said advertisers continue to support WVLG and new advertisers were being added. Community programming includes reuniting people with lost pets.
