= Housing for Older Persons Act =

United States federal housing law

- Long title: Housing for Older Persons Act of 1995
- Acronyms (colloquial): HOPA
- Enacted by: the 104th United States Congress
- Effective: December 28, 1995

Citations
- Public law: 104-76
- Statutes at Large: 109 Stat. 787

Codification
- Acts amended: Fair Housing Act
- Titles amended: 42
- U.S.C. sections created: 42 U.S.C. § 3601
- U.S.C. sections amended: 42 U.S.C. § 3607(b)(2)(C); 42 U.S.C. § 3607(b)

Legislative history
- Signed into law by President Bill Clinton on December 28, 1995

The Housing for Older Persons Act of 1995 (HOPA) (Pub. L. 104–76 (text) (PDF), 109 Stat. 787, enacted December 28, 1995) amends Title VIII of the Civil Rights Act of 1968 (Fair Housing Act). The consolidated Act is administered by the United States Department of Housing and Urban Development (HUD). The law was signed by President of the United States Bill Clinton on December 28, 1995.

HOPA amends the Fair Housing Act as follows:

- eliminates the requirement that qualified housing for persons age 55 or older have "significant facilities and services" designed for the elderly
- provides "good faith reliance" immunity from damages to persons who in good faith believe and rely on a written statement that a property qualifies for the 55 or older exemption, unaware that the property is ineligible for the exemption.

== The Act's language and summary ==
The Act "amend[s] the Fair Housing Act to modify the exemption from certain familial status discrimination prohibitions granted to housing for older persons." The short title is the "Housing for Older Persons Act of 1995."

Section 2, defining "housing for older persons", amends Section 807(b)(2)(C) of the Fair Housing Act, as that being

intended and operated for occupancy by persons 55 years of age or older, and--

(i) at least 80 percent of the occupied units are occupied by at least one person who is 55 years of age or older

(ii) the housing facility or community publishes and adheres to policies and procedures that demonstrate the intent required under this subparagraph; and

(iii) the housing facility or community complies with rules issued by the Secretary for verification of occupancy, which shall--

(I) provide for verification by reliable surveys and affidavits; and

(II) include examples of the types of policies and procedures relevant to a determination of compliance with the requirement of clause (ii). Such surveys and affidavits shall be admissible in administrative and judicial proceedings for the purposes of such verification.

— Housing for Older Persons Act § 2.

A good faith attempt to comply with the Act is a defense against civil money damages; Section 807(b) of the Fair Housing Act is amended by adding:

(5)(A) A person shall not be held personally liable for monetary damages for a violation of this title if such person reasonably relied, in good faith, on the application of the exemption under this subsection relating to housing for older persons.

(B) For the purposes of this paragraph, a person may only show good faith reliance on the application of the exemption by showing that--

(i) such person has no actual knowledge that the facility or community is not, or will not be, eligible for such exemption; and

(ii) the facility or community has stated formally, in writing, that the facility or community complies with the requirements for such exemption.

— Housing for Older Persons Act § 3.

It was approved on December 28, 1995 and signed into law by President Bill Clinton.

=== Summary ===
This law states that it is legal for communities to market themselves as "55+"or "age-restricted" provided they maintain that 80 percent of the occupied units are occupied by at least one person who is 55 years of age or older. However, if the number of people age 55+ in a given community falls below the 80 percent threshold, the community could lose its age-restricted status (and loss of such status would be permanent).

Most 55+ age-restricted active adult communities will place an age-minimum on the residents. In most active adult communities, no one under the age of 19 may reside in the community unless granted an exemption (or, if the community has designated "family units", resides within those areas). However, at a community's discretion, the age-minimum may be higher or lower. Furthermore, most communities stipulate that if anyone under the age of 55 resides in their community, they must live in a household where at least one occupant is 55 or older. Nearly all age-restricted and active adult communities allow people under the age minimum, such as grandchildren, to visit and stay on a limited basis. Most age-restricted communities have covenants that allow people under the age-minimum to reside temporarily in the community for a period of time ranging from two weeks to 90 days per year (varies by community).

== History ==
- December 28, 1995 - signed into law by President Bill Clinton, following approval by the Senate and House of Representatives
- April 2, 1999 - HUD publishes final regulation implementing HOPA, effective May 3, 1999
