= Wildwood Middle High School =

Location
- 700 Huey Street; Wildwood, Florida 34785; United States
- Coordinates: 28°51′26″N 82°01′56″W

Information
- Type: Public
- School district: Sumter District Schools
- NCES School ID: 120180001941
- Principal: Rodney Rocker
- Teaching staff: 49.00 (on FTE basis)
- Grades: 7 to 12
- Enrollment: 843 (2022-2023)
- Student to teacher ratio: 17.20
- Colors: Royal blue and white
- Nickname: Wildcats
- Website: wmh.sumter.k12.fl.us

Wildwood Middle High School is located in Wildwood, Florida. The school is the 7-12 school for the Sumter District Schools.

== Demographics ==
The demographic breakdown of the 764 students enrolled in Fall 2019-2020 per Florida DOE was:

- Male - 51.3%
- Female - 48.7%
- Black - 37.3%
- Hispanic - 17%
- White - 40.6%
- Multiracial - 3.9%
- Sub-Groups - 1.2%
- Economically Disadvantaged - 84.8%
- Students with Disabilities - 19.6%

84.8% of the students were eligible for free or reduced lunch.
