= WMFV =

Semi-satellite of WMFE-FM, Orlando, Florida
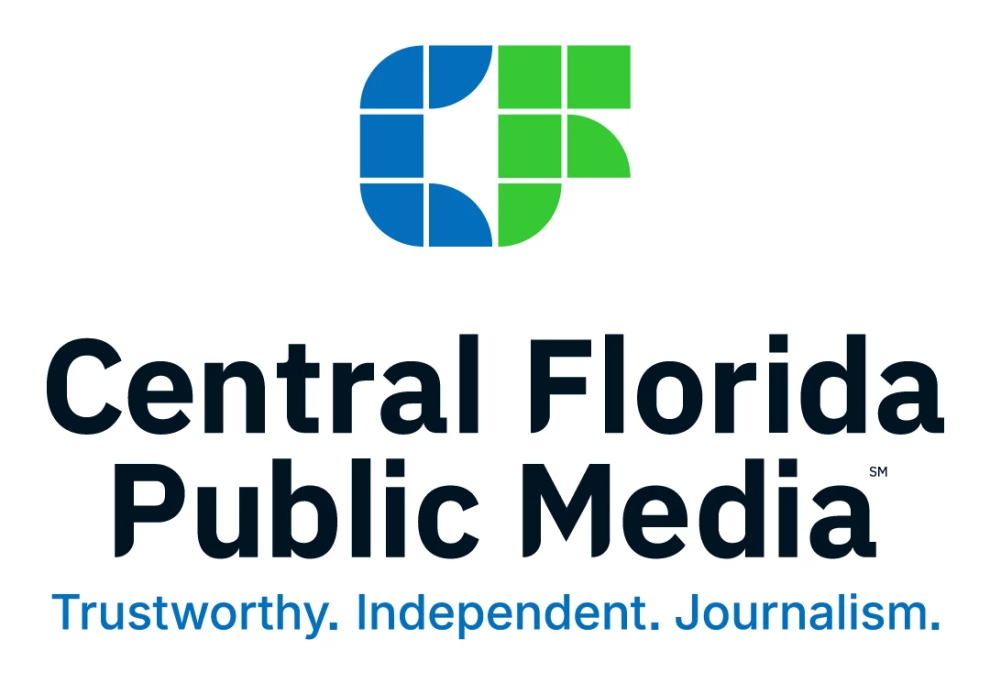
- Cedar Creek, Florida; United States
- Broadcast area: Ocala and The Villages
- Frequency: 89.5 MHz
- Branding: Central Florida Public Media

Programming
- Format: Public radio
- Affiliations: NPR; American Public Media; Public Radio Exchange; BBC World Service

Ownership
- Owner: Community Communications, Inc.

History
- Former call signs: WKSG (1993–2018)
- Call sign meaning: "Mid-Florida Educational Radio for The Villages"

Technical information
- Licensing authority: FCC
- Facility ID: 9714
- Class: C2
- ERP: 22,000 watts
- HAAT: 114.2 m (375 ft)
- Transmitter coordinates: 29°11′16.9″N 81°52′54.3″W

Links
- Public license information: Public file; LMS
- Webcast: Listen live
- Website: www.cfpublic.org

WMFV (89.5 FM) is a radio station in Ocala, Florida, broadcasting a public radio format as a member of National Public Radio (NPR). Licensed to the unincorporated suburb of Cedar Creek (near the western entrance of the Ocala National Forest), the station is owned by Community Communications of Orlando as a semi-satellite of Central Florida's main NPR station, WMFE-FM 90.7, and is operated out of WMFE-FM's studios at the Hugh F. McKean Public Broadcasting Center on East Colonial Drive in Orlando. In addition to Ocala, WMFV serves The Villages, an age-restricted master planned development. This arrangement is similar to a commercial station in Orlando, as Fox's O&O television station WOFL (channel 35) has Ocala-based WOGX (channel 51) also serve as a semi-satellite station.

The last logo under previous Daystar ownership.

After 15 years as a contemporary Christian music station, the then-WKSG, known as Daystar Radio 89.5, changed formats New Year's Day 2008 to a carefully researched and blended mix of big band, smooth jazz and select adult album alternative music calling itself "The Boulevard". The station was owned by Daystar Public Radio, Inc. (a company completely unrelated to the Daystar Television Network). The WKSG call sign was previously used by a Detroit-area station on 102.7 FM, now WDKL.

Initial logo as WMFV, prior to 2024.

On September 25, 2017, it was announced that WKSG was sold by Daystar to Community Communications. The deal expanded WMFE-FM's footprint to an underserved area of Central Florida, including portions of Lake and Marion counties. The station changed its call sign to WMFV on January 4, 2018. The sale closed on January 5, 2018. On March 3, 2018, the station soft-launched under CCI management, carrying WMFE-FM's locally originated programming and NPR's Morning Edition and All Things Considered, with automated classical music from Classical 24 outside of that time. In early September 2019, the station dropped classical music, along with some local programming, replacing it with additional news/talk programming from WMFE-FM and other public radio sources.
