= H. Gary Morse =

American businessman (1936–2014)

- Born: Harold Gary Schwartz; December 19, 1936; Chicago, Illinois
- Died: October 29, 2014 (aged 77)
- Occupation: Community developer
- Employer: Holding Company of the Villages Ltd.
- Spouse(s): Sharon (d. 1999); Renee (his death, 2014)
- Children: 3
- Relatives: Megan Boone (granddaughter)

Harold Gary Morse (December 19, 1936 – October 29, 2014) was an American billionaire and the developer, along with his father Harold Schwartz, of the active adult retirement community The Villages, Florida.

== Personal life ==
Morse was born in Chicago, Illinois, the son of Mary Louise (née Lee) and Harold Schwartz, who later moved to Arizona. His father was Jewish. After his parents divorced, Mary Louise married Clifford Morse (Morse would later take his stepfather's surname) and moved to Central Lake, Michigan.

H. Gary Morse was first married to Sharon Morse, who died in 1999. Morse and his second wife, Renee, lived together in a house in The Villages worth more than $1 million. Morse had three children — Mark Morse, Jennifer Parr, and Tracy Morse— each of whom own and work for the Holding Company of the Villages Ltd. He was known for having had a private life, making little contact with other residents and not giving interviews to the media. Upon his death, his family issued the following statement regarding Morse's life:

"Dad never sought the limelight. He was content to stay in the background and enjoy seeing Villagers revel in this amazing lifestyle of their adopted hometown. While he was a friend and adviser to captains of industry, presidents and heads of state, he never lost focus on this community and making it the greatest retirement development in the world."

He was a close friend of former United States Surgical Corporation CEO Leon C. Hirsch, and is the grandfather of actress Megan Boone.

Morse died on October 29, 2014.

== Career ==
Before being a land developer, Morse worked as an advertising executive in Chicago. In 1983, Morse moved to Florida to take over his father's business selling vacant lots to mobile home owners. Morse instead decided to build homes, restaurants, pools, and golf courses, and by 1986, Morse was selling more than 500 homes per year. In 2011, the Holding Company of the Villages Ltd. generated at least $550 million in revenue. Morse was also the proprietor of a bank, an insurance company, a local newspaper, and other properties. Morse has been described as owning "just about everything" in the community.

In 2008, Morse settled for a $40 million class-action lawsuit that alleged that he had misused monthly community amenity fees.

The IRS investigated the special tax districts Morse used for The Villages on the basis that the bonds sold by the districts did not qualify for tax-exempt status. However, once the IRS learned that the bonds had been fully redeemed, the investigation was closed as moot.

== Political involvement ==
Morse, his children, and The Villages have donated tens of thousands of dollars to the campaigns of Florida Governor, Rick Scott, and served as significant fundraisers for George W. Bush, as well as Mitt Romney. In addition, Morse donated hundreds of thousands of dollars to the Republican National Committee. Morse also used his 147-foot yacht, the Cracker Bay, for political gatherings. Upon receiving news of his death, Scott and United States Senator Marco Rubio issued separate statements on Morse's vision and ultimate realization of The Villages.
