= Harold Schwartz =

American businessman and real estate developer

- Born: March 13, 1910; Chicago, Illinois
- Died: December 22, 2003 (aged 93); Lady Lake, Florida
- Organization(s): Holding Company of the Villages, Inc.
- Spouses: Mary Louise Lee (m. 1934; div. 1945) Bernice Newman (m. 1946–2003)
- Children: Harold Gary Morse; Mary Louise Morse; Richard A. Schwartz
- Relatives: Megan Boone (great-granddaughter)

Harold Schwartz (March 13, 1910 – December 22, 2003) was an American businessman and real estate developer who along with his son, H. Gary Morse, founded the active adult retirement community The Villages, Florida.

== Early life ==
Harold Schwartz was born March 13, 1910, in Chicago, Illinois, the son of Louis and Katherine Schwartz. Harold was Jewish.

== Career ==
In the 1930s, Schwartz worked as a travelling salesman, selling products for his father's tailoring company until it was forced to close due to the Great Depression.

In 1947, Schwartz began purchasing radio stations, including several "border buster" stations in Mexico. Many of these stations, located just across the border with the United States, operated without proper licenses. Schwartz is credited with the discovery of famed disk jockey and radio personality Wolfman Jack, employing him at his Tijuana, Mexico, radio station in the late 1960s.

In the 1950s and 60s, Schwartz operated a thriving mail-order real estate business, selling plots of land in New Mexico and Florida to customers around the country until federal law banned the practice in 1968.

== Founding of The Villages ==
In the early 1970s, Schwartz turned his focus from mail-order land sales to land development. Schwartz, along with business partner Al Tarrson, founded Orange Blossom Gardens, a mobile home park in Central Florida located off of US Highway 27-441. Using land leftover from his mail-order land sales business, Schwartz began selling homes to retirees. Initially, sales were slow, with only about 400 homes being built in the original development.

In 1983, Schwartz, unsatisfied with the progress, bought out Tarrson's interest in the business and brought in his son, advertising executive, H. Gary Morse as a business partner. Together, Schwartz and Morse increased sales at Orange Blossom Gardens exponentially and created interest in the growing community.

In 1992, the name of the development was changed from Orange Blossom Gardens to The Villages.

== Personal life ==
In 1934, Schwartz married Mary Louise Lee. Together, the two shared a son, Harold, and a daughter, Mary. The two later divorced. In 1946, Schwartz married Bernice Newman. Together they shared a son, Richard.

Schwartz died on December 22, 2003, at the age of 93. His ashes were interred in the base of a statue depicting him at Spanish Springs Town Square in Lady Lake, Florida.
