= WMFE-FM =

Public radio station in Orlando, Florida

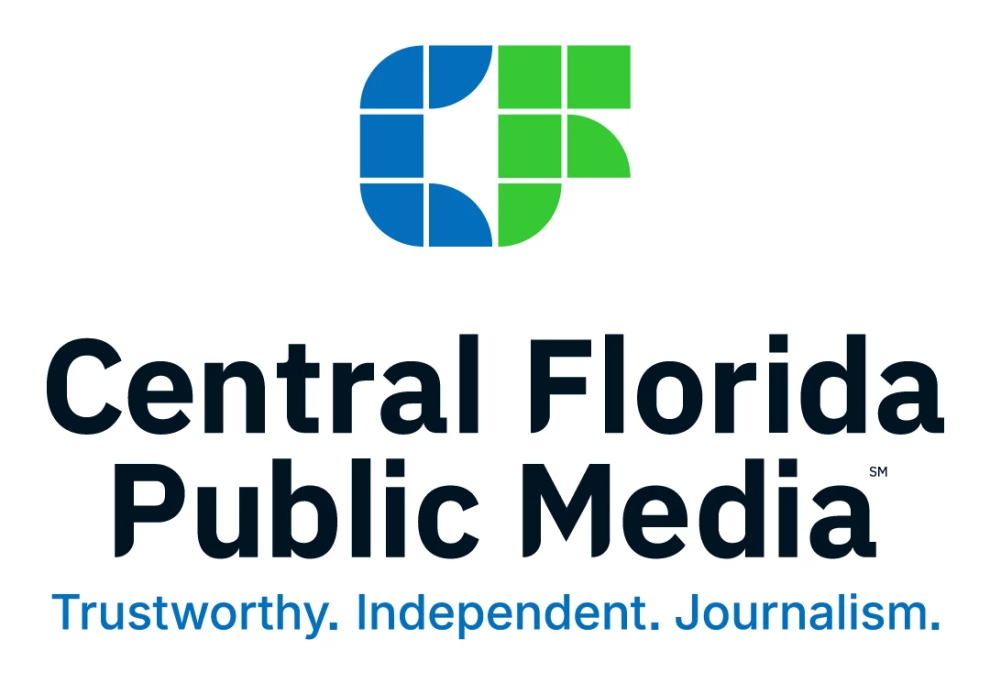
- Orlando, Florida; United States
- Broadcast area: Central Florida
- Frequency: 90.7 MHz (HD Radio)
- Branding: Central Florida Public Media

Programming
- Format: Public radio
- Subchannels: HD2: Classical
- Affiliations: NPR; American Public Media; Public Radio Exchange; BBC World Service

Ownership
- Owner: Community Communications, Inc.
- Sister stations: WMFV

History
- First air date: July 14, 1980
- Call sign meaning: Mid-Florida Educational

Technical information
- Licensing authority: FCC
- Facility ID: 12857
- Class: C1
- ERP: 98,000 watts
- HAAT: 223 m (732 ft)
- Transmitter coordinates: 28°36′9″N 81°5′36″W

Links
- Public license information: Public file; LMS
- Webcast: Listen live
- Website: www.cfpublic.org

WMFE-FM (90.7 MHz) is a listener-supported FM radio station in Orlando, Florida, owned by Community Communications, Inc. WMFE-FM is Central Florida's National Public Radio (NPR) member station, with a format of news and information. Most programming is simulcast on WMFV (89.5 FM) in Cedar Creek, Florida. The studios are at the Hugh F. McKean Public Broadcasting Center on East Colonial Drive in Orlando.

WMFE-FM has an effective radiated power (ERP) of 100,000 watts, the maximum for non-grandfathered FM stations. The transmitter is on TV Tower Road in Bithlo, Florida, amid the towers for other Orlando-area FM and TV stations.

== History ==
On July 14, 1980, the station signed on. In its early years, it played a mix of classical music and jazz, along with news and information from NPR. The jazz music was dropped in 1983. Prior to that year, NPR programming was only available on a part-time basis via University of Central Florida station WUCF-FM (WFTU-FM until 1978), leaving Orlando as the largest radio market in the nation without a full-time public radio station.

Over time, the music shows were replaced with more public radio informational shows. In November 2009, the primary HD1 channel switched to an all-news/talk format with programs from NPR and other public radio sources. The HD2 digital subchannel became the source for classical music, with some weekend specialty music.

In April 2011, Community Communications announced that it had entered into a definitive agreement to sell PBS member sister station WMFE-TV to the Daystar Television Network, due to economic conditions. The organization said it would keep WMFE-FM's radio station and call sign, since its listener contributions were able to meet expenses.

The sale of WMFE-TV to Daystar was later canceled. Instead, Community Communications sold the television station in 2012 to the University of Central Florida, which intended to restore its PBS programming. The TV station's call letters switched to WUCF-TV.

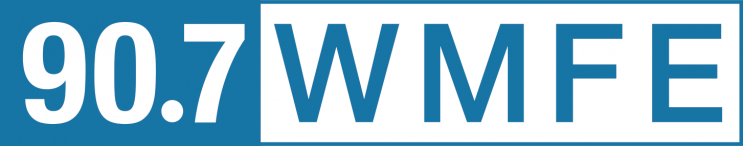
Logo as "90.7 WMFE" prior to 2024

On September 25, 2017, it was announced that WMFE-FM would acquire WKSG in Cedar Creek, Florida, (near Ocala) from Daystar Public Radio, Inc. (an entity unrelated to the Daystar Television Network) Upon approval of the deal, WMFE-FM switched the format on WKSG to public radio news/talk. It provides public radio coverage to underserved areas of Central Florida, including portions of Lake and Marion counties. The call sign on WKSG was changed to WMFV, similar to WMFE-FM's call sign.

On April 3, 2024, WMFE-FM rebranded as "Central Florida Public Media".
