= Joyce Cusack =

American politician (born 1942)

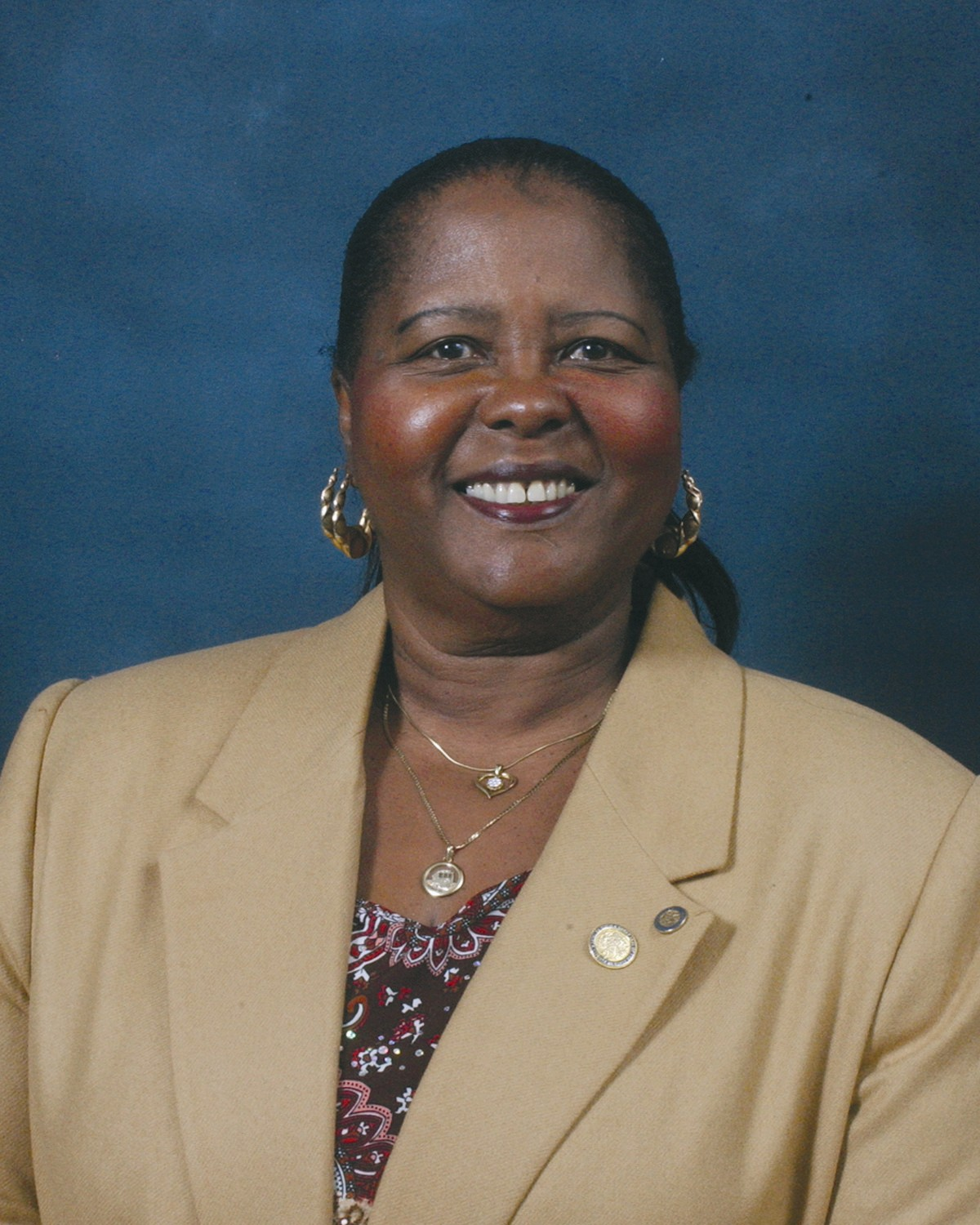

Member of the Volusia County Council from the at-large district
- In office January 1, 2011 – December 31, 2018
- Preceded by: Joie Alexander
- Succeeded by: Ben Johnson

Member of the Florida House of Representatives
- In office November 7, 2000 – November 4, 2008
- Preceded by: Pat Patterson
- Succeeded by: Dwayne Taylor
- Constituency: 26th district (2000–2002); 27th district (2002–2008)

Personal details
- Born: May 21, 1942 (age 84) New Smyrna Beach, Florida
- Party: Democratic
- Spouse: Chuck Cusack (m. 1961; died 2009)
- Children: 2
- Education: Daytona Beach Community College (A.A.); Saint Leo College (B.A.)
- Occupation: Nurse

Joyce Marie Cusack (born May 21, 1942) is a Democratic politician from Florida who served as a member of the Florida House of Representatives from 2000 to 2008 and as a member of the Volusia County Council from 2011 to 2018.

Cusack was born in New Smyrna Beach, Florida, and resides in DeLand, Florida. She received her associate's degree in nursing from Daytona Beach Community College (now Daytona State College) in 1971 and her bachelor's degree in psychology from Saint Leo University in Saint Leo, Florida in 1984.

She was first elected to the House in 2000, when she defeated Pat Patterson for the District 26 seat, and was subsequently re-elected in 2004.

Some of the committees that Cusack was affiliated with were Trade and Banking, Health Care General, Select Committee on Medicaid Reform, Spaceport and Technology, State Infrastructure Council, Transportation and Economic Development Appropriations.

Cusack was re-elected to a fourth term in the Florida House, beating former Ormond Beach Mayor Dave Hood with about 63 percent of the vote, according to unofficial results on November 7, 2006. Her victory led a trend of incumbent representatives winning re-election to the Florida House of Representatives. She served as the Democratic Leader pro tempore of the Florida House in 2006, which made her the number two ranking Democratic member.

Cusack was awarded an honorary doctorate degree from Bethune-Cookman University in 2007, she left the Florida Legislature in May 2008 due to term limits. In November 2010, she won the Volusia County Council at-large seat defeating Margie Patchett. In 2014, Cusack retained her at-large seat, defeating Pat Northey.

== Personal life ==
She was married to Charles Cusack Jr. (deceased), and has two grown daughters, and three grandchildren.

She is a member of Delta Sigma Theta sorority.
