= Richard McMahan =

American politician (1932–2011)

Richard McMahon

Member of the Florida House of Representatives from the 26th district
- In office November 3, 1992 – November 8, 1994
- Preceded by: Paul Hawkes
- Succeeded by: Earl Ziebarth

Personal details
- Born: March 24, 1932 Greenwood, South Carolina
- Died: January 2, 2011 (aged 78) DeLand, Florida
- Party: Democratic
- Spouse: Mary "Dinky" Blount
- Children: 1
- Education: Clemson University (B.A.)
- Occupation: Businessman, construction

Military service
- Allegiance: United States
- Branch/service: United States Army
- Years of service: 1954–1955

Richard A. "Dick" McMahon (March 24, 1932 – January 2, 2011) was a Democratic politician from Florida who served as a member of the Florida House of Representatives from the 26th district from 1992 to 1994.

== Early life ==
McMahan was born in Greenwood, South Carolina, in 1932, and attended Clemson University, graduating with his bachelor's degree in architecture in 1954. He served in the U.S. Army from 1954 to 1955, and moved to Florida in 1960, where he settled in DeLand, Florida. McMahan was a businessman, and founded West Volusia Utilities, which he sold to Volusia COunty in 1986. In 1966, he founded a construction company that build water and wastewater treatment facilities.

== Florida House of Representatives ==
In 1992, McMahan ran for the Florida House of Representatives from the newly created 26th district, which was based in western Volusia County. He won the Democratic nomination unopposed, and faced Republican George Shierling, an accountant, in the general election. McMahan defeated Shierling by a narrow margin, receiving 50.3 percent of the vote to Shierling's 49.7 percent. Shierling initially sought to contest the result, alleging that a computer malfunction caused some votes to be omitted from the total, but conceded when the result was finalized.

McMahan ran for re-election in 1994, and was challenged by Republican Earl Ziebarth, an agricultural executive. Following a contentious campaign, Ziebarth defeated McMahan, winning 52 percent of the vote to his 48 percent.

== Post-legislative career ==
McMahan was appointed to the Stetson University Board of Trustees in 1994, and served until 2009, when he became trustee emeritus. He and his wife endowed the Richard and Mary McMahan Scholarship, and contributed to the construction of Mary B. McMahan Hall, which houses the School of Music.

== Death ==
McMahan died on January 2, 2011.
