= Fred Costello =

American dentist and politician

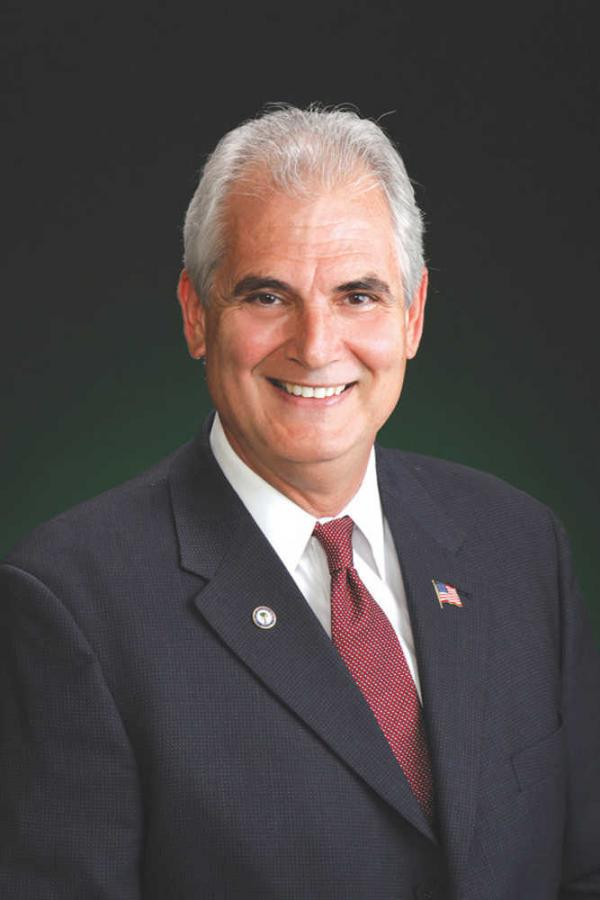

Member of the Florida House of Representatives from the 25th district
- In office November 4, 2014 – November 8, 2016
- Preceded by: Dave Hood Jr.
- Succeeded by: Tom Leek

Member of the Florida House of Representatives from the 26th district
- In office November 2, 2010 – November 6, 2012
- Preceded by: Pat Patterson
- Succeeded by: Dwayne Taylor

Personal details
- Born: February 9, 1950 (age 76) Orlando, Florida, U.S.
- Party: Republican
- Spouse: Linda Gail Ditzig
- Children: Angela Fe Costello Cavanaugh, Lucas Jacob Costello, Eric David Costello
- Education: Graceland University (B.S.); University of Iowa (D.D.S.)
- Profession: Dentist

Military service
- Allegiance: United States
- Branch/service: United States Air Force
- Years of service: 1974–1977
- Rank: Captain

Fredrick W. Costello (born February 9, 1950) is an American dentist and politician. A member of the Republican Party, Costello served as a member of the Florida House of Representatives, representing the 25th District, from 2014 to 2016. Previously, he represented the 26th District, from 2010 to 2012.

== Early life and career ==
Costello was born in Orlando, Florida, and attended Graceland University, from which he graduated in 1970. He then attended the University of Iowa, receiving his Doctor of Dental Surgery in 1974. After graduation, Costello joined the United States Air Force, from 1974 to 1977, serving as a Captain, and then returned to Florida in 1977, settling in Ormond Beach and practicing dental medicine. He was elected to the Ormond Beach City Commission, where he served from 1999 to 2002, and then was elected mayor, serving from 2002 to 2010.

== Florida House of Representatives (2010–2012) ==
In 2010, following the inability of State Representative Pat Patterson to seek re-election, Costello ran to succeed him in the 26th District, which included southern Flagler County and northern Volusia County, stretching from Ormond Beach to Deltona. He faced Nathan McDonnell and Vince Champion in the Republican primary, whom he was able to handily defeat, receiving 50% of the vote to McDonnell's 28% and Champion's 23%. Advancing to the general election, Costello campaigned on "creating jobs for Floridians in renewable-energy research development and manufacturing," and was opposed by Tim Huth, the Democratic nominee and the former Deputy Superintendent of Volusia County Schools. Costello dispatched Huth with ease to win his first term in the legislature, scoring 60% of the vote to Huth's 40%.

== 2012 congressional campaign ==
When the state's Congressional districts were redrawn in 2012, Costello opted to run in the newly-created 6th District, which stretched along the east coast of the state, including Flagler County, southern Putnam County, St. Johns County, and northern Volusia County. He faced former federal prosecutor Ron DeSantis, restaurant executive Craig Miller, St. Johns County School Board member Beverly Slough, Jacksonville City Councilman Richard Clark, William Billy Kogut, and Alec Pueschel in the Republican primary. Costello campaigned on his support for "individual and 'states rights'" and clashed with DeSantis, who attacked Costello in mail advertisements and television advertisements as a "tax and spend" liberal who voted in the legislature to give undocumented immigrants in-state tuition, for spending increases, and for an internet sales tax. Costello strongly condemned DeSantis's charges, declaring, "While DeSantis continues to call me a career politician...he travels around campaigning and aligning himself with Washington insiders." Ultimately, Costello placed second to DeSantis, who would later go on to win the general election, receiving 22.8% of the vote to DeSantis's 38.8%.

== Return to Florida House (2014–2016) ==
When State Representative Dave Hood, Jr. decided to run for a seat on the Volusia County Circuit Court rather than seek re-election, Costello jumped into the race to succeed him in the 25th District, which is based in eastern Volusia County, including Ormond Beach, Daytona Beach Shores, Port Orange, Ponce Inlet, and New Smyrna Beach. Costello won the Republican primary unopposed, and faced Noel Bickford, a retired healthcare executive and the Democratic nominee, in the general election. He campaigned on promoting job creation, increasing protection of the environment, and preserving home rule of local governments, as his work was not done in elected office, declaring, "I never intended to get out of politics. I'm looking forward to going back to work." Costello ended up defeating Bickford by a wide margin, winning 59% of the vote.

== 2016 congressional campaign ==
When Rep. Ron DeSantis decided to run for Marco Rubio's U.S. Senate seat after Sen. Rubio entered the 2016 presidential race, Fred Costello entered the race to fill DeSantis' seat in Florida's 6th Congressional District. Fred was one of 6 Republican candidates until Sen. Rubio dropped his presidential bid, and Rep. DeSantis opted to drop out of the Senate race to run for re-election. Costello remained in the race (as promised). G.G. Galloway, an Ormond Beach-based realtor also remained in the race with Rep. DeSantis. The incumbent congressman won 61.0% of the Republican primary vote. Costello won 24.7% and Galloway won 14.3%.

== 2018 congressional campaign ==
When Rep. Ron DeSantis opted to run for Governor of Florida instead of re-election, Costello entered the race for Congress in Florida's 6th Congressional District. He launched his campaign with a series of rallies in Ormond Beach, Palm Coast, St. Johns County, Deltona, and Mount Dora. Costello's campaign theme — "Fred stands for US" — emphasized years of public elected and volunteer service as a local leader attending to the issues of his constituents in the community. Mike Waltz defeated Costello and John Ward in the Republican primary with 42.4% of the vote, compared to 30.4% for Ward and 27.2% for Costello. Waltz went on to win the general election over Democrat Nancy Soderberg.
