= Lake Okahumpka =

Lake in Florida, United States

- Okahumkee Lake; West Lake Okahumpka
- Location within Florida Location within the United States
- Location: Wildwood, Florida, United States
- Coordinates: 28°49′33″N 82°00′20″W
- Surface elevation: 56 feet (17 m)

Lake Okahumpka is a freshwater lake in Wildwood, Florida, United States. Lake Okahumpka Park is along part of its shoreline. In 1980, the United States Geological Survey reported on the hydrology of Lake Okahumpka and Lake Deaton area.

The lake is east of Wildwood on the south side of State Road 44. The lake has been treated for hydrilla. Ring neck ducks have been hunted from its shores.

== See also ==
- Okahumpka, Florida
