= Florida State Road 44 =

Highway in Florida, US

State Road 44
- SR 44 highlighted in red (eastern section signed as North Causeway)

Route information
- Maintained by FDOT
- Length: 102.786 mi (165.418 km)
- Existed: 1945 renumbering (definition)–present

Western section
- Length: 49.155 mi (79.107 km)
- West end: US 19 / US 98 in Crystal River
- Major intersections: US 41 in Inverness; I-75 near Wildwood; US 301 in Wildwood
- East end: US 441 in Leesburg

Central section
- Length: 52.198 mi (84.005 km)
- West end: US 441 in Mount Dora
- Major intersections: US 17 / US 92 in DeLand; I-4 near DeLand; I-95 in New Smyrna Beach; US 1 in New Smyrna Beach
- East end: SR A1A in New Smyrna Beach

Eastern section (Signed as North Causeway)
- Length: 1.433 mi (2.306 km)
- West end: North Riverside Drive in New Smyrna Beach
- East end: Peninsula Avenue in New Smyrna Beach

Location
- Country: United States
- State: Florida
- Counties: Citrus, Sumter, Lake, Volusia

Highway system
- Florida State Highway System; Interstate; US; State; Former; Pre‑1945; Toll; Scenic
| ← SR 43 | → SR 45 |

State Road 44 (SR 44) is an east–west state highway in the U.S. state of Florida. It runs from Crystal River on the Gulf of Mexico east to New Smyrna Beach on the Atlantic Ocean, passing through Inverness, Wildwood, Leesburg and DeLand.

A section in Lake County, between eastern Leesburg and a point north of Mount Dora, is concurrent with U.S. Highway 441 (SR 500). This concurrency is not signed; signs on US 441 mark it as TO SR 44. The former alignment of SR 44 in that area is now mostly County Road 44, which runs north of Lake Eustis, on the other side as US 441 and current SR 44.

A former western extension of SR 44 from Crystal River to the Gulf of Mexico is now County Road 44. In some locations, it is signed as County Road 44W.

== Route description ==
=== Crystal River to Inverness ===
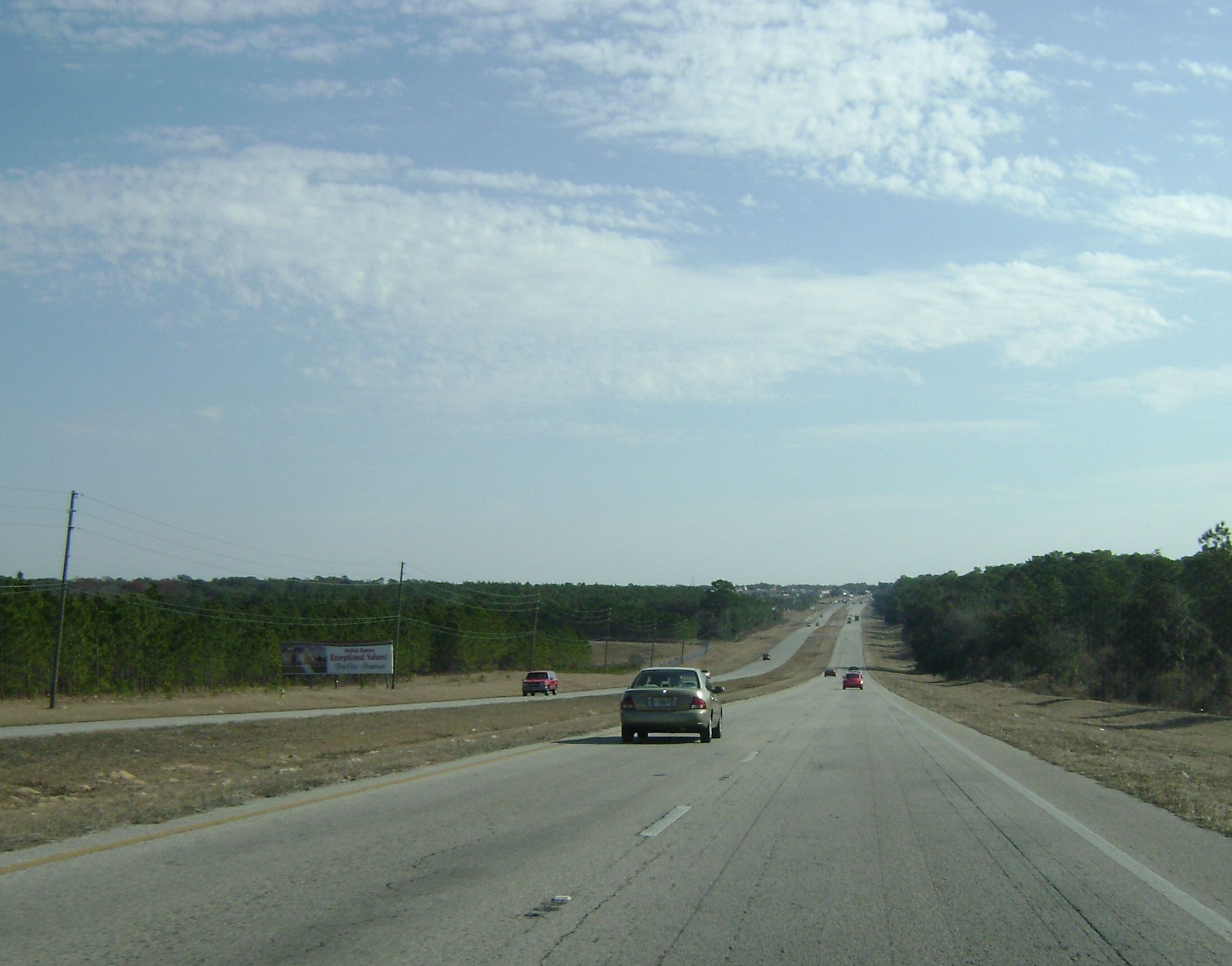
SR 44 as a divided highway west of Inverness.

State Road 44 begins as NE 5TH ST (then Gulf to Lake Highway) at the intersection of US 19/98 in Crystal River, a four-lane divided highway. The divider only exists at the intersection, however, the rest of the road is undivided throughout much of Western Citrus County. SR 44 runs directly east, until it leaves the city limits, then makes a sharper southeastern turn prior to the intersection of North Dunkenfield Avenue and West Norvell Bryant Highway (County Road 486). It briefly turns east again as it reaches the intersection of Rock Crusher Road, but curves back to the southeast roughly a mile later. The new interchange with the Suncoast Parkway Extension is built just northwest of where the divider begins again near the intersection of County Road 491 in Lecanto, after which the road turns east again.

After crossing Lecanto Highway (County Road 491), the divider becomes more prominent, The road runs up and down various hills as it runs along the northern border of Withlacoochee State Forest, and though it never stays straight, it still runs mostly east. Near a pair of shopping centers, the divider ends east of Croft Avenue, and the road resumes its status as an undivided four-lane highway with center-left turn lanes. Entering the Inverness City Limits, the road straightens out again at the intersection of South Pleasant Grove Road(County Road 581) and Forest Drive, where it becomes Main Street. CR 581 secretly joins SR 44 as a hidden route. One block before CR 581 leaves SR 44 to become its own route again, southbound US 41 joins SR 44. The two routes continue to move directly east until the intersection of Seminole Avenue, where it curves around the Old Citrus County Courthouse, and then moves to the southeast before breaking off at East Highland Boulevard, where US 41 continues towards Floral City, Brooksville, Tampa, and points south, while SR 44 moves onto Gulf-Atlantic Highway and becomes a divided highway once again.

=== Inverness to Leesburg ===
East of US 41, SR 44 runs over the Withlacoochee State Trail with bike ramps on both sides, and then along the southern shore of Lake Henderson. The rest of the road is surrounded by farms, parkland, and boat launching areas, especially as it gets ready to cross the Withlacoochee River at the Citrus-Sumter County Line, where it enters Rutland. The rural landscape continues even at the northwest end of County Road 470, which leads to Lake Panasoffkee, Sumterville, and Okahumpka in Lake County.

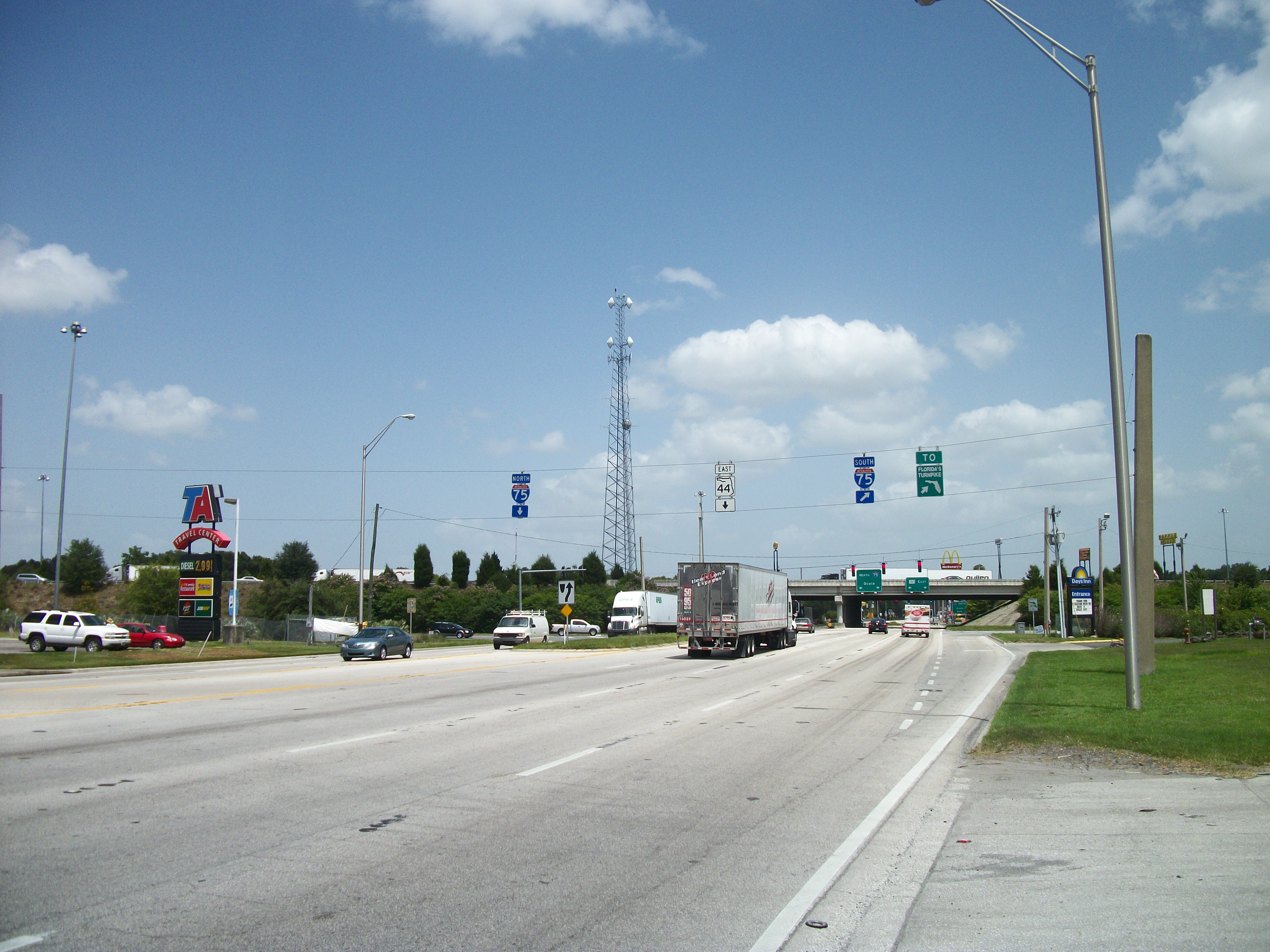
The many truck stops and travel plazas on SR 44 at Interstate 75 in Wildwood. Florida's Turnpike is nearby on the southbound on-ramp.

As the road enters Wildwood it is lined with truck stops, travel plazas, hotels, and other tourist attractions surrounding the interchange with Interstate 75 as well as Florida's Turnpike. The Florida Department of Transportation and Florida's Turnpike Enterprise have combined the ramps to and from the turnpike into those onto I-75. The road curves to the southeast again, as it approaches the western terminus of County Road 44A. After straightening out again, it approaches a four-lane bridge over the CSX Wildwood Subdivision that was completed in 2010, just before the road intersects with US 301. East of US 301, the road takes another slight southeastern curve where it passes through the recently expanded community of The Villages, Florida and later meets the eastern terminus of County Road 44A and then CR 468 in the former community of Orange Home, just before crossing the Lake County Line. A former railroad line running from Wildwood to Leesburg that ran along the south side of CR 44A runs along the north side of the road, when CR 44A ends

Before reaching Downtown Leesburg, SR 44 makes a sharp right turn onto a truck bypass at the intersection of Main Street and County Road 468. The name of this section is South Street and it runs north and south, until it takes a sharp curve at Casteen Road, which it replaces. South Street continues to run in its easterly direction and approaches Venture Avenue, which was built on a former southwest-to-northeast railroad right-of-way, and Carpenter Avenue which runs along the east side of this former ROW. SR 44 approaches the intersection of US 27, and turns into West Dixie Avenue, where it runs northeast momentarily, and then turns east again. At the intersection of South Palmetto Street and west end of Dozier Circle, West Dixie Avenue turns into East Dixie Avenue. The road curves to the northeast again at Lake Port Boulevard and crosses the same abandoned railroad line that originated in Wildwood. Right after the intersection of East Main Street, SR 44 joins Southbound US 441, but both continue to run east.

=== Leesburg to Mount Dora ===
The US 441-SR 44 segment is a six-lane divided highway with provisions for bicycles. The road serves as the western terminus of County Road 44 then passed by Leesburg International Airport. From here it squeezes between Lake Harris and Lake Eustis where it crosses over the Dead River on a bridge between the two lakes.

The southbound wye at State Road 19 in Tavares, is also shared by County Road Old 441, and northbound SR 19 joins US 441 and SR 44 through the rest of Tavares into Eustis until it encounters an interchange with State Road 19 and part of CR 19A.

North of Mount Dora, SR 44 leaves US 441, which curves south towards Orlando and Miami. SR 44 turns north then narrows from four lanes to two lanes before it curves between Lake Joanna and Loch Leven before passing by the Mid Florida Air Service Airport in Eustis. From there the road turns right onto East Orange Avenue, which continues Route 44's status as a two lane rural scenic highway.

=== Seminole State Forest through DeLand ===
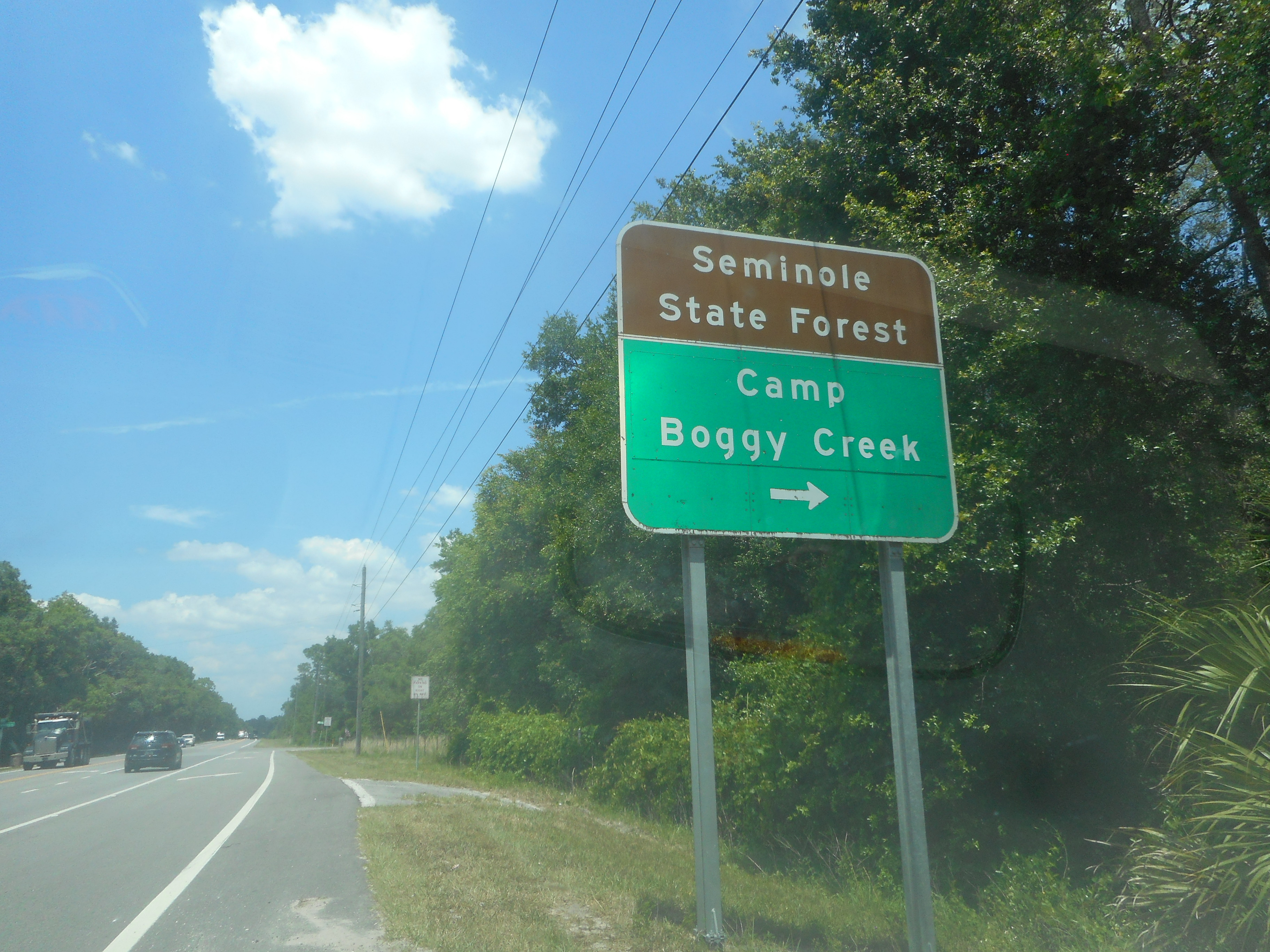
Sign along SR 44 for Seminole State Forest and Camp Boggy Creek.

Before the road curves northeast, an intersection with County Road 46A gives motorists the option of taking a turn towards State Road 46. As the road curves and intersects County Road 44A, it enters Seminole State Forest. In Crow's Bluff, SR 44 serves as the eastern terminus of County Road (former State Road) 42 and immediately crosses the Francis P. Whitehair Bridge over the St. Johns River, where it enters Volusia County and curves back east. West of DeLand, SR 44 is named West New York Avenue and runs along a bridge over an Amtrak line north of DeLand (Amtrak station), but then crosses a grade crossing for a railroad spur leading from the station into Downtown DeLand.

Motorists know they're getting close to Downtown DeLand itself when they intersect State Road 15A, but SR 44 doesn't actually enter downtown until it passes through the Downtown DeLand Historic District and approaches U.S. Route 17/92. Here, West New York Avenue becomes East New York Avenue, but no turns at this intersection are allowed from either direction. Access to US 17/92 is only available from nearby side roads two or more blocks away. The road begins to move southeast from Talmadge Gardens Road to East Voorhis Avenue then takes a south turn along the west coast of Lake Winnemisett and becomes a four-lane divided highway again at the south end of Lake Winnemisett. It then bypasses a former section of SR 44 just before it approaches Interstate 4, which contains partial cloverleaf ramps on the southwest and northeast corners of the bridge.

=== Toward New Smyrna Beach ===
East of I-4, SR 44 becomes a four lane divided highway, serving as the northern terminus of State Road 415 and the southern terminus of County Road 415, where the New Smyrna Speedway can be found on the northwest corner. O'Reilly Road, a gateway to a housing development is slated to become County Road 4009. A partial cloverleaf exists for Interstate 95, with separate westbound and eastbound off-ramps for southbound traffic. Northbound traffic uses a half-diamond interchange.

When the road finally arrives within the New Smyrna Beach city limits, Florida State Road 44 Business branches off to the northwest as Canal Street, while SR 44 itself becomes Lytle Avenue. The final segment of SR 44 runs on top of a bridge that goes over the Florida East Coast Railroad Main Line and U.S. Route 1 where the road becomes a segment of State Road A1A. Access to and from US 1 is only available from SR A1A, unless motorists from SR 44 use side streets within New Smyrna Beach.

== History ==
The route includes former segments of Florida State Roads 22, 36, 2, 21, and 75 until the 1945 Great Renumbering, when they were replaced with a route number previously assigned to Florida State Road 46. From that point until the mid-1960's, the segment between US 17/92 in DeLand and US 1 in New Smyrna Beach was part of Florida State Road 40. The segment even included a Florida State Road 40A along Pioneer Trail, which remained in place even after the realignment of SR 40 from Barberville to Ormond Beach. SR 40A was later downgraded to a county road and later replaced by Volusia County Road 4118.

In Lake County, SR 44 originally passed through downtown Leesburg on Main Street, merging with US 441 east of downtown. It then split to the north on current County Road 44, passing north of Lake Eustis. North of Eustis, it turned southeast on present County Road 452, merging with State Road 19 into downtown Eustis, where it turned east on Orange Avenue to rejoin current SR 44 east of Eustis.

The current alignment around the south side of Leesburg was taken over ca. 1986. It had previously been State Road 468 from the west end to U.S. Highway 27 (SR 25) and State Road 33 from roughly Canal Street east to Main Street, but was given to the county by the early 1980s.

At some point, SR 44 from US 441 east of Leesburg to State Road 19 north of Eustis was given to the county and numbered County Road 44; the route via US 441 and SR 19 south of Lake Eustis became SR 44. CR 44 has since been realigned to bypass Eustis to the north.

SR 44 was realigned around downtown Eustis in 2005, taking over what had been County Road 44B between US 441 and SR 44 east of Eustis. The Florida Department of Transportation gave SR 44 west of CR 44B to Lake County. CR 44B had been marked from US 441 as a bypass to SR 44 east and from SR 44 as a bypass to US 441 south, as part of a longer bypass of Eustis also including County Road 44 north and west to SR 19.

== Major intersections ==
| County | Location | mi | km | Destinations | Notes |
|---|---|---|---|---|---|
| Citrus | Crystal River | 0.000 | 0.000 | US 19 / US 98 (North Suncoast Boulevard / SR 55) – Homosassa Springs, St. Petersburg, Inglis, Crystal River Archaeological State Park | |
| Citrus | | 2.378 | 3.827 | CR 486 east (West Norvell Bryant Highway) – Hernando | |
| Citrus | | 5.621 | 9.046 | SR 589 (Suncoast Parkway) – Tampa, Crystal River, Hernando | |
| Citrus | Lecanto | 6.811 | 10.961 | CR 490 west (West Homosassa Trail) – Homosassa Springs, Yulee Sugar Mill Ruins Historic State Park | |
| Citrus | Lecanto | 7.310 | 11.764 | CR 491 (South Lecanto Highway) – Ocala, Beverly Hills, Brooksville, College of Central Florida Citrus Campus | |
| Citrus | Inverness | 15.906 | 25.598 | CR 581 south (South Pleasant Grove Road) – Brooksville | |
| Citrus | Inverness | 16.581 | 26.685 | To CR 581 north / Davidson Avenue | |
| Citrus | Inverness | 16.668 | 26.825 | US 41 north (SR 45) – Hernando, Dunnellon | West end of US 41 / SR 45 overlap |
| Citrus | Inverness | 17.615 | 28.349 | US 41 south (SR 45) – Floral City, Brooksville, Fort Cooper State Park | East end of US 41 / SR 45 overlap. Wye intersection until approximately the early 1980's. |
| Citrus | | 21.105 | 33.965 | CR 470 west (East Gospel Island Road) | |
| Sumter | Rutland | 27.294 | 43.925 | CR 470 east – Lake Panasoffkee | |
| Sumter | | 30.970 | 49.841 | CR 475 north | |
| Sumter | | 32.70 | 52.63 | I-75 (SR 93) to Florida's Turnpike – Ocala, Tampa | I-75 exit 329; Turnpike exit 307 |
| Sumter | | 33.698 | 54.232 | CR 44A east | |
| Sumter | Wildwood | 36.282 | 58.390 | US 301 (SR 35) – The Villages, Belleview, Coleman | |
| Sumter | Orange Home | 39.387 | 63.387 | CR 44A west | |
| Sumter | Wildwood | 41.012 | 66.002 | CR 468 west | |
| Lake | Leesburg | 44.641 | 71.843 | CR 468 north / West Main Street – Leesburg, Downtown | |
| Lake | Leesburg | 46.929 | 75.525 | US 27 (South 14th Street / SR 25) to Florida's Turnpike – Ocala, Clermont | |
| Lake | Leesburg | 49.155 | 79.107 | US 441 (North Boulevard / SR 500) to SR 44 east | |
| Lake | Gap in route | | | | |
| Lake | Mount Dora | 0.000 | 0.000 | US 441 (SR 500) to SR 44 west / Donnelly Street – Mount Dora, Orlando | Former CR 44B |
| Lake | Eustis | 2.110 | 3.396 | East Orange Avenue - Eustis, Eustis By-Pass to SR 19 north | |
| Lake | | 4.074 | 6.556 | CR 439 north | |
| Lake | | 7.110 | 11.442 | CR 437 – Sorrento | |
| Lake | | 8.263 | 13.298 | CR 46A south – Sanford | |
| Lake | Cassia | 11.672 | 18.784 | CR 44A west | |
| Lake | Crows Bluff | 22.667 | 36.479 | CR 42 west – Paisley, Altoona | |
| St. Johns River | | 22.97 | 36.97 | Francis P. Whitehair Bridge | |
| Volusia | | 25.472 | 40.993 | CR 4053 north (Grand Avenue) – Glenwood | Roundabout |
| Volusia | | 26.172 | 42.120 | CR 4110 west (Old New York Avenue) – Hontoon Island State Park, Amtrak | |
| Volusia | DeLand | 26.880 | 43.259 | SR 15A (Spring Garden Avenue) – by-pass to US 17 / US 92 | |
| Volusia | DeLand | 28.140 | 45.287 | US 17 / US 92 (Woodland Boulevard / SR 15 / SR 600) – Daytona Beach, Orange City, DeLeon Springs | |
| Volusia | | 30.840 | 49.632 | CR 4101 (Kepler Road) | |
| Volusia | DeLand | 32.082 | 51.631 | CR 4139 south (Summit Avenue) – Lake Helen, Cassadaga, Daytona State College | Intersection continues as "SR 44A" |
| Volusia | | 33.00 | 53.11 | I-4 (SR 400) – Daytona Beach, Sanford | I-4 exit 118 |
| Volusia | | 33.770 | 54.348 | Prevatt Avenue - Lake Helen | |
| Volusia | | 39.692 | 63.878 | CR 4118 east (Pioneer Trail) | |
| Volusia | Samsula | 43.244 | 69.594 | SR 415 south / CR 415 north – Osteen, Sanford | |
| Volusia | New Smyrna Beach | 48.16 | 77.51 | I-95 (SR 9) – Jacksonville, Miami | I-95 exit 249 |
| Volusia | New Smyrna Beach | 51.191 | 82.384 | SR 44 Bus. east to US 1 – Atlantic Center for the Arts | |
| Volusia | New Smyrna Beach | 52.1 | 83.8 | US 1 (SR 5) to SR A1A north | Interchange; westbound exit and eastbound entrance |
| Volusia | New Smyrna Beach | 52.198 | 84.005 | SR A1A south to SR 44 east (North Causeway) – Beaches | |
| Volusia | New Smyrna Beach | Gap in route | | | |
| Volusia | New Smyrna Beach | 0.000 | 0.000 | North Riverside Drive | |
| Volusia | New Smyrna Beach | 1.22 | 1.96 | North Causeway over Indian River (Atlantic Intracoastal Waterway) | |
| Volusia | New Smyrna Beach | 1.433 | 2.306 | Peninsula Avenue | |
1.000 mi = 1.609 km; 1.000 km = 0.621 mi: Concurrency terminus

== Related roads ==
=== State Road 44 Business ===
State Road 44 Business
- Location: New Smyrna Beach

State Road 44 Business is a state road in New Smyrna Beach, Florida. The latest GIS data has it listed as SR 44 even though there are two signs which have "business" tabs on them. Business 44 was the old alignment of SR 44 through downtown New Smyrna Beach.

=== County Road 44W (Citrus County) ===
West Fort Island Trail
- Location: Fort Island-Crystal River

County Road 44W exists as the western tip of old State Road 44, south of Crystal River. The suffix, "W", was most likely added to not confuse this section with State Road 44, to the north, and to show its location by being west of US 19 and US 98(SR 55). As with the majority of these types of 'coastal spur' routes, in West Central Florida, it is county maintained.

=== County Road 44A (Sumter County) ===
County Road 44A
- Location: Wildwood – Orange Home

County Road 44A exists along the north side of State Road 44 in Wildwood and Orange Home. The road begins southeast of the interchange with Interstate 75, and instantly intersects with CR 225, which runs north and south, while CR 44A runs directly east and west until it curves slightly to the right and becomes Kilgore Street. The road then moves south onto Central Avenue running parallel to the CSX line until reaching Lynum Street, and crosses the tracks until Lynum Street terminates at US 301. County Road 44A then not only crosses US 301 to enter Huey Street, but the wye for the former Leesburg and Tavares railroad line. One block away, CR 44A breaks away from Huey Street and curves south before running along the north side of the right-of-way of the previously mentioned abandoned railroad line. The line contained a series of abandoned freight cars until the 2000s (decade), and the road and railroad line followed each other until CR 44A terminates at a recreational vehicle park in Orange Home.

=== Lake County ===
County Road 44
- Location: Leesburg – Mount Dora

County Road 44 is a county highway in Lake County in the U.S. state of Florida. It runs from U.S. Route 441 near Leesburg in the west to State Road 44 near Mount Dora in the east.

The western terminus County Road 44 is at an intersection with the concurrency of U.S. Route 441, State Road 44, and State Road 500 at the eastern edge of Leesburg, near Leesburg Regional Airport. From there, it heads northeast past Silver Lake, then east past Lake Eustis, before arriving in the town of Eustis.

In Eustis, CR 44 intersects State Road 19. There, CR 44 splits into two branches. The northern branch heads east from the intersection to its terminus at County Road 44A. The southern branch continues south from the intersection, concurrent with SR 19, before turning east on East Orange Avenue. It then passes by Lake Joanna before terminating at State Road 44 between the towns of Eustis and Mount Dora.

County Road 44 Leg A is a short spur near CR 44's western terminus in Leesburg. It serves as an alternate route for northbound US 441 traffic to reach eastbound CR 44.

==== County Road 44A ====
County Road 44A
- Location: Umatilla – Mount Dora

County Road 44A is an east/west county road in Lake County in the U.S. state of Florida. Its western terminus is at State Road 19 in Umatilla, and its eastern terminus is at State Road 44 about 10 miles (16 km) east of Mount Dora.

The western terminus of County Road 44A is at an intersection with State Road 19 in the town of Umatilla. CR 44A heads out of Umatilla eastward on Rose Street before turning south. Then in Dalhousie Acres (near Lake Dalhousie), it intersects County Road 450A before continuing south towards Eustis.

On the eastern edge of Eustis, CR 44A intersects one of the eastern termini of County Road 44 before turning east once again on DeLand Road. It then continues east on DeLand Road for approximately 9.4 miles (15.1 km), passing by Black Bear Golf Club, before reaching its eastern terminus at State Road 44.

==== County Road 44B ====
County Road 44B
- Location: Mount Dora
- Existed: Unknown-2004

County Road 44B, formerly a short north–south county route in the Mount Dora area. In 2004, CR 44B was turned over to State Road 44 when SR 44 was re-routed out of downtown Eustis, with SR 44 becoming a complete eastern and southern bypass of Eustis. The remaining portion of SR 44 through Eustis was reverted to CR 44, and remains unsigned to this day.

==== County Road 44C ====
County Road 44C
- Location: Mount Dora

County Road 44C, is Eudora Road, a short north–south county route also in the Mount Dora area. It spans from the convoluted intersection between Old County Road 441 and the eastern terminus of County Road 19A to US 441-SR 44 almost crossing the Mount Dora-Eustis border.
