= Lake Deaton =

Lake in Florida, United States

- A dock off the coast of Lake Deaton in January 2021.

- Location within Florida Location within the United States
- Location: Wildwood, Florida, United States
- Coordinates: 28°50′05″N 81°58′55″W
- Primary outflows: Chitty Chatty Creek
- Surface elevation: 66 feet (20 m)

Lake Deaton is a lake in Wildwood, Florida, United States. Lake Deaton Park is located on its shore. In 2019 improved amenities and a pier were planned as part of an improvement project to accommodate dragon boat racers from the The Villages community. The lake is on the north side of State Road 44. Lake Okahumpka is on the south side of the road. In 1980, the United States Geological Survey reported on the areas hydrology including the two lakes.
