= Taylor Yarkosky =

American politician

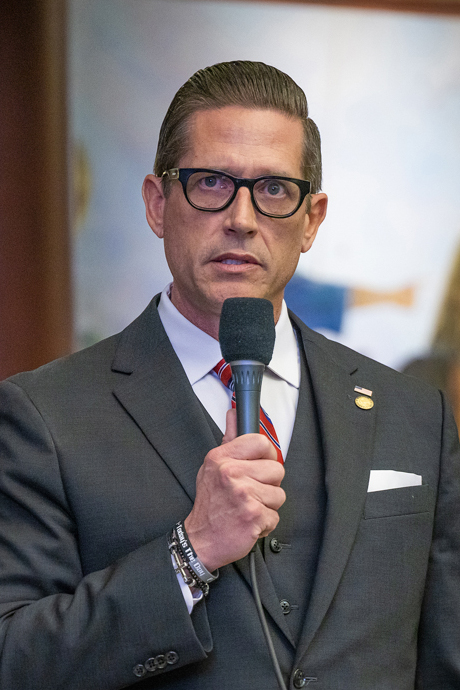
- Yarkovsky in 2023

Member of the Florida House of Representatives from the 25th district
- Incumbent
- Assumed office November 8, 2022
- Preceded by: Tom Leek

Personal details
- Born: March 6, 1977 (age 49) Albia, Iowa, U.S.
- Party: Republican
- Spouse: Courtney Yarkosky
- Children: 5
- Education: University of Iowa
- Criminal information
- Criminal information
- Status: Released
- Conviction: Driving under the influence (x2)

Taylor Yarkosky (born March 6, 1977) is an American politician. He serves as a Republican member for the 25th district of the Florida House of Representatives.

== Life and career ==
Yarkosky was born in Albia, Iowa. He attended the University of Iowa.

In 2004 and 2005, Yarkosky was arrested for drunk driving. During his 2022 primary campaign, attack mailers were sent to residents of his district criticizing Yarkosky's criminal record.

In August 2022, Yarkosky defeated Liz Cornell, Matthew Silbernagel and Tom Vail in the Republican primary election for the 25th district of the Florida House of Representatives. In November 2022, he defeated Banks Helfrich in the general election, winning 66 percent of the votes.
