= Judge Hood =

Judge Hood may refer to:

- Dave Hood Jr. (1954–2019), judge of the Seventh Judicial Circuit of Florida
- Denise Page Hood (born 1952), judge of the United States District Court for the Eastern District of Michigan
- Joseph Martin Hood (born 1942), judge of the United States District Court for the Eastern District of Kentucky
