= David Hume Baker =

American politician (1841–1917)

David Hume Baker (October 7, 1841 – June 1, 1917) was a state senator in the US states of Kentucky and Florida. His historic home, which was built between 1886 and 1890, still stands in Wildwood, Florida, and hosts various events. The home was built in what was then the community of Orange Home, Florida. The Baker House was part of a 1,200-acre property. The house stayed in the family for several generations before it was sold to the City of Wildwood in 2012. A historical marker was added at the site of the Baker House in 2019 by the Timucua Chapter of the Colonial Dames of the 17th Century.

During the Civil War, Baker served in the Union Army as a member of the 12th Kentucky Cavalry Regiment. He was a state senator in Kentucky from 1873 until 1875. Baker then moved from Muhlenberg County, Kentucky, to Orange Home, Florida. Baker served in the Florida Legislature from 1886 until 1890.

He married Mary Hanah Matthis; they had one son, David Mathias Baker. He is buried with his wife Mary (1844–1932) at Arlington National Cemetery. His son was part of the Ingraham Expedition.
