= Richard Locke =

Richard Locke may refer to:

- Richard Locke (critic), American critic and essayist
- Richard M. Locke, American political scientist
- Richard Holt Locke, American actor, AIDS educator and activist

== See also ==
- Dick Locke, member of the Florida House of Representatives
