= Electoral history of Ron DeSantis =

Elections featuring Governor of Florida

This article describes the electoral history of Ron DeSantis, the 46th and current governor of Florida and a former member of the United States House of Representatives.

A member of the Republican Party, DeSantis was initially elected to the House in 2012 to represent Florida's 6th congressional district. He retained his seat for three terms before not seeking a fourth to pursue the governorship.

DeSantis won the gubernatorial election in 2018 by a margin of around 32,000 votes against Democratic nominee Andrew Gillum. DeSantis won re-election, facing former Florida governor Charlie Crist in the 2022 Florida gubernatorial election.

== US House of Representatives ==
=== 2012 ===
2012 Florida's 6th congressional district election
Party	Candidate	Votes	%
Republican	Ron DeSantis	195,962	57.3
Democratic	Heather Beaven	146,489	42.8
Total votes		342,451	100.0
Republican hold			

Republican primary results
Party	Candidate	Votes	%
Republican	Ron DeSantis	24,132	38.8
Republican	Fred Costello	14,189	22.8
Republican	Beverly Slough	8,229	13.2
Republican	Craig Miller	8,113	13.1
Republican	Richard Clark	6,090	9.8
Republican	Alec Pueschel	739	1.2
Republican	William Billy Kogut	628	1.0
Total votes		62,120	100.0

=== 2014 ===
In this election, no GOP primary was held and DeSantis won the nomination unopposed.

2014 Florida's 6th congressional district election
Party	Candidate	Votes	%
Republican	Ron DeSantis (incumbent)	166,254	62.5
Democratic	David Cox	99,563	37.5
Total votes		265,817	100.0
Republican hold			

=== 2016 ===
2016 Florida's 6th congressional district election
Party	Candidate	Votes	%
Republican	Ron DeSantis (incumbent)	213,519	58.6
Democratic	Bill McCullough	151,051	41.4
Total votes		364,570	100.0
Republican hold			

2016 Florida's Republican 6th congressional district primary
Party	Candidate	Votes	%
Republican	Ron DeSantis (incumbent)	41,311	61.0
Republican	Fred Costello	16,690	24.7
Republican	G.G. Galloway	9,683	14.3
Total votes		67,684	100.0

== Governor of Florida ==
2018 Florida gubernatorial election map

=== 2018 ===
2018 Florida gubernatorial election
Party	Candidate	Votes	%
Republican	Ron DeSantis Jeanette Nuñez	4,076,186	49.6
Democratic	Andrew Gillum Chris King	4,043,723	49.2
Reform	Darcy Richardson Nancy Argenziano	47,140	0.6
Independent	Kyle "KC" Gibson Ellen Wilds	24,310	0.3
Independent	Ryan Christopher Foley John Tutton Jr.	14,630	0.2
Independent	Bruce Stanley Ryan McJury	14,505	0.2
Write-in		67	0.0
Total votes		8,220,561	100.0
Republican hold			

2018 Florida Republican gubernatorial primary
Party	Candidate	Votes	%
Republican	Ron DeSantis	913,679	56.5
Republican	Adam Putnam	591,449	36.6
Republican	Bob White	32,580	2.0
Republican	Timothy M. Devine	21,320	1.3
Republican	Bob Langford	19,771	1.2
Republican	Bruce Nathan	14,487	0.9
Republican	Don Baldauf	13,125	0.8
Republican	John Joseph Mercadante	11,602	0.7
Total votes		1,618,013	100.0

2022 Florida gubernatorial election map

=== 2022 ===
In this election, DeSantis received the GOP gubernatorial nomination unopposed and no primary election was held.

2022 Florida gubernatorial election
Party	Candidate	Votes	%
Republican	Ron DeSantis (incumbent) Jeanette Nuñez (incumbent)	4,614,210	59.4
Democratic	Charlie Crist Karla Hernandez	3,106,313	40.0
Independent	Carmen Jackie Gimenez Kyle "KC" Gibson	31,577	0.4
Libertarian	Hector Roos Jerry "Tub" Rorabaugh	19,299	0.2
Total votes		7,771,399	100.0
Republican hold			

== Presidential elections ==
=== 2024 ===
==== Primaries ====
Iowa Republican precinct caucuses, January 15, 2024
Candidate	Votes	Percentage	Actual delegate count		
Candidate	Votes	Percentage	Bound	Unbound	Total
Donald Trump	56,243	51.00%	20	0	20
Ron DeSantis	23,491	21.30%	9	0	9
Nikki Haley	21,027	19.07%	8	0	8
Vivek Ramaswamy	8,430	7.64%	3	0	3
Ryan Binkley	768	0.70%	0	0	0
Asa Hutchinson	188	0.17%	0	0	0
Other	90	0.08%	0	0	0
Chris Christie (withdrawn)	35	0.03%	0	0	0
Total:	110,272	100.00%	40	0	40

==== Presidential write-ins ====
DeSantis received 325 write-in votes in the 2024 United States presidential election.This note is disputed as there is no nationwide aggregate of write-in votes and DeSantis was reported to have won at least 400 write-in votes in 5 Florida counties alone.
