= Bill Partington =

American politician from Florida

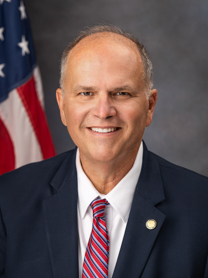
- Official portrait, c. 2024

Member of the Florida House of Representatives from the 28th district
- Incumbent
- Assumed office November 5, 2024
- Preceded by: Tom Leek

Mayor of Ormond Beach
- In office November 8, 2016 – November 5, 2024
- Preceded by: Ed Kelley
- Succeeded by: Jason Leslie

Member of the Ormond Beach City Commission from Zone 4
- In office November 2, 2004 – November 8, 2016
- Succeeded by: Rob Littleton

Personal details
- Born: William E. Partington III; 1968 (age 57–58) Daytona Beach, Florida, U.S.
- Party: Republican
- Spouse: Lori Partington (m. 1993)
- Children: 3
- Education: Daytona State College (AA); University of Central Florida (BA); Loyola University New Orleans (JD)
- Occupation: Politician; lawyer
- Website: www.billpartington.com

William E. Partington III (born 1968) is an American politician and attorney who serves as a Republican member of the Florida House of Representatives representing the 28th district, which comprises northern parts of Volusia County, including Ormond Beach and Daytona Beach. He previously served as Mayor of Ormond Beach from 2016 to 2024 and as a member of the Ormond Beach City Commission from 2004 to 2016.

== Early life and education ==
William E. Partington III was born in 1968 in Daytona Beach, Florida. He graduated from Mainland High School in 1986. Partington earned an associate degree from Daytona State College before receiving his bachelor's in communications from the University of Central Florida. He then went on to graduate from Loyola University New Orleans with a Juris Doctor in 1995.

== Political career ==
Partington worked as an assistant public defender from 1996 to 2001. He has worked as an assistant state attorney for the Seventh Judicial Circuit Court of Florida since 2007.

=== Ormond Beach ===
Partington was elected to the Ormond Beach Commission for Zone 4 in 2004. He was re-elected to six consecutive terms and served as deputy mayor during his last three terms. He was elected mayor of Ormond Beach in June 2016. Partington served four terms as mayor until he retired to run for Florida House in 2024. He was succeeded by fellow Republican Jason Leslie.

=== Florida House of Representatives ===
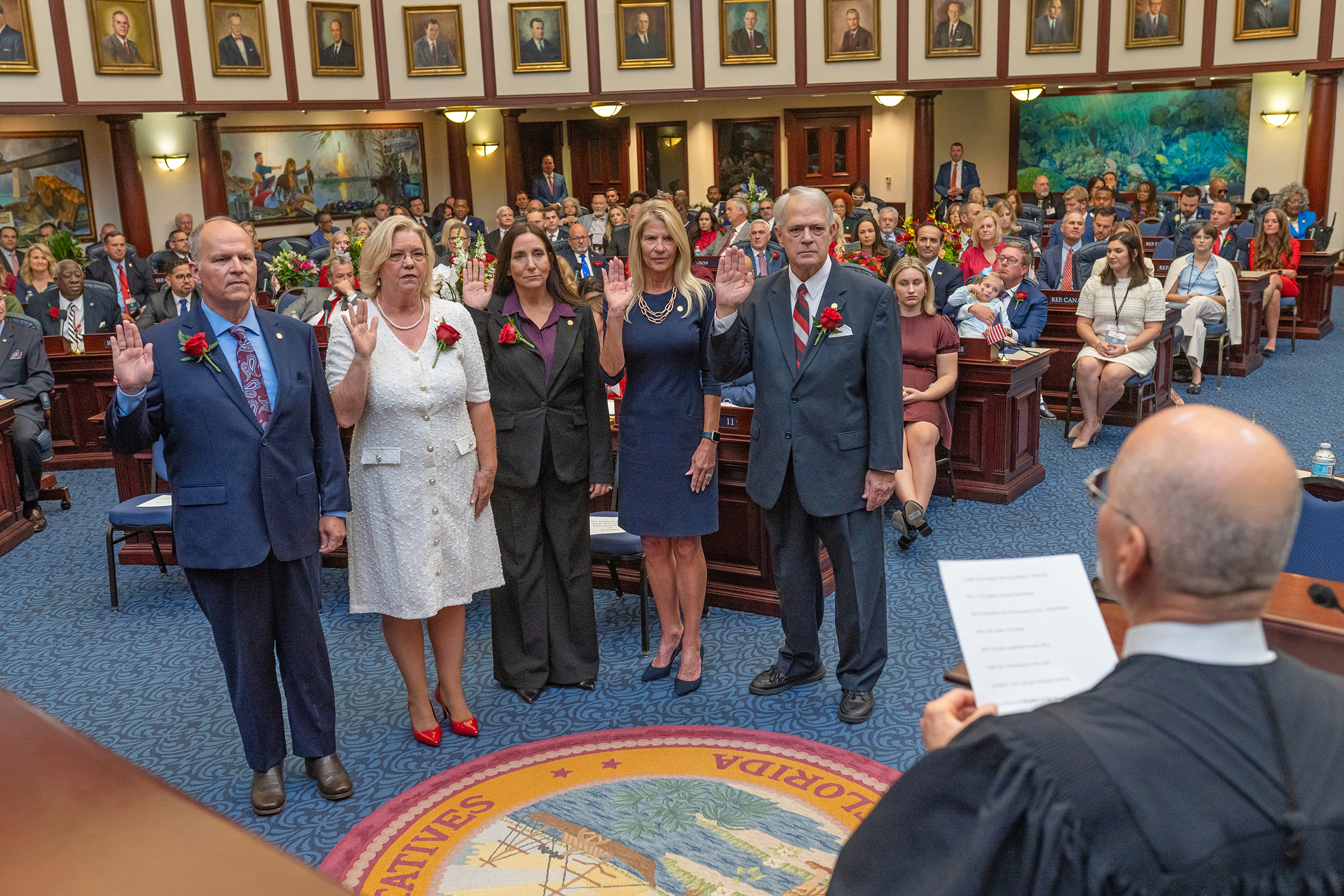
Swearing in of Florida State Representatives, 2024

Partington announced his candidacy for district 28 for the Florida House of Representatives in March 2023. After winning the August primary uncontested, he was elected to the Florida Legislature in November 2024. He was officially sworn into office on November 19, 2024.

== Personal life ==
Partington married his wife Lori in 1993. They have three daughters and live in Ormond Beach, Florida.

Florida House of Representatives
Preceded by Tom Leek	Member of the Florida House of Representatives from the 28th district 2024–present	Incumbent
