= Earl Ziebarth =

American politician (born 1963)

Member of the Florida House of Representatives from the 26th district
- In office November 8, 1994 – November 3, 1998
- Preceded by: Richard McMahan
- Succeeded by: Pat Patterson

Personal details
- Born: December 13, 1963 (age 62) DeLand, Florida
- Party: Republican
- Spouse: Janet
- Education: University of Florida (B.S.)
- Occupation: Agriculture

Earl William Ziebarth III (born December 13, 1963) is a Republican politician and businessman from Florida who served as a member of the Florida House of Representatives from the 26th district from 1994 to 1998.

== Early life ==
Ziebarth was born in DeLand, Florida, in 1963, and attended the University of Florida, where he was elected president of student government and graduated with his bachelor's degree in agriculture in 1986. After graduation, he worked for the state Commissioner of Agriculture and Insurance Commissioner as a public relations specialist, and then returned to DeLand, where he worked at Growers' Supply.

== Florida House of Representatives ==
In 1994, Ziebarth announced that he would challenge Democratic State Representative Richard McMahan for re-election in the 26th district, saying, "I think this area has desired conservative representation and they haven't had it." He narrowly defeated McMahan, winning 52 percent of the vote to his 48 percent.

Ziebarth ran for re-election in 1996, and was challenged by former DeLand City Commissioner Janet Bollum, a Democrat. Both parties invested in the race, and Ziebarth ended up winning re-election, receiving 52 percent of the vote to Bollum's 48 percent.

In 1998, Volusia County Councilman Pat Patterson announced that he would challenge Ziebarth in the Republican primary, and though Ziebarth initially planned to seek re-election, he announced that he would not do so, saying that he "decided I was going to choose my family over running."
