= Orange Home, Florida =

Community in Florida

Coordinates: 28°49′47″N 81°59′46″W

Orange Home was a community in Florida and is now a neighborhood three miles from Wildwood, Florida. It was a stop on a rail line through the area.

Orange Home dates to at least 1886 when it was listed in a Florida state directory as "Eight miles west of Leesburg, on the I. R. branch of the F. R. & N. Co's railroad". At the time it had a store, public school, a commercial school, blacksmiths, and a saw mill.

In 1925, a new city was planned in the area. In 1926, the plans included an educational center, an idea originally made by the previous owner of the property, state senator David Hume Baker. The land was acquired by C. Edgar Wood a capitalist from Baltimore with the aim to develop it and the area around Lake Okahumpka and Lake Deaton.

State senator Baker lived in Orange Home and his historic Baker House remains there. Baker served in the Kentucky Senate before moving to Florida and served in the Florida Senate. His family acquired 1,200 acres of what had been orange groves and converted them to cattle ranchlands after a freeze.
