= Francis P. Whitehair Bridge =

Bridge in Florida, United States of America

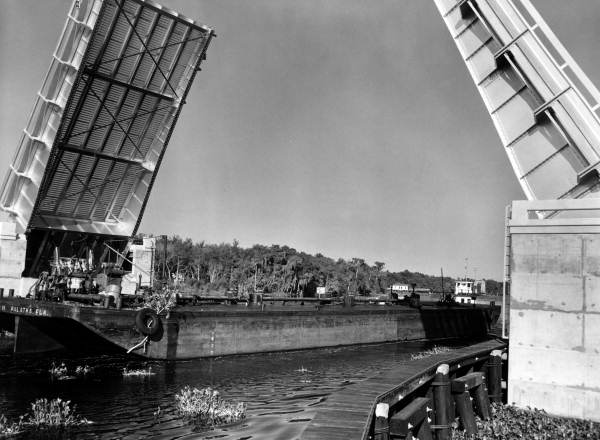
- The Whitehair Bridge in its open position in 1955.
- Coordinates: 29.0088°N 81.3821°W
- Carries: SR 44 (two general purpose lanes)
- Crosses: St. Johns River
- Locale: Crows Bluff, Florida
- Official name: Francis P. Whitehair Bridge
- Maintained by: Florida Department of Transportation
- ID number: 110603

Characteristics
- Design: Double leaf bascule bridge
- Total length: 525 feet (160 m)
- Clearance below: 17 feet (5.2 m)

History
- Opened: September 1955

Location
- Interactive map of Francis P. Whitehair Bridge

The Francis P. Whitehair Bridge, also known as the Crows Bluff Bridge, was a double leaf bascule bridge located in Crows Bluff, Florida that carried State Road 44 over the St. Johns River. The original bridge on the site was constructed in 1917; replaced in 1955, and though it was previously expected to remain in service until the 2050s, a new version of the bridge opened in September 2023.

== History ==
The original Crows Bluff Bridge was a swing span bridge; constructed in 1917, in 1926 it became a free crossing. In 1954, a plan for construction of a replacement bridge was established; the new bridge, dedicated to DeLand resident Francis P. Whitehair, opened on September 22, 1955.

In the late 1980s and early 1990s the bridge was closed several times for repairs.

A 1993 truck accident damaged the bridge, requiring repairs to its guardrails. In 2006 a truck caused damage to the bridge's support beams in another accident; the damage was repaired within a week.
