= Keith Truenow =

American politician (born 1969)

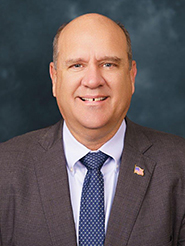

Member of the Florida Senate from the 13th district
- Incumbent
- Assumed office November 5, 2024
- Preceded by: Dennis Baxley

Member of the Florida House of Representatives
- In office November 6, 2018 – November 5, 2024
- Preceded by: Jennifer Sullivan
- Succeeded by: Nan Cobb
- Constituency: 31st district (2018–2022); 26th district (2022–2024)

Personal details
- Born: August 9, 1969 (age 56) St. Cloud, Minnesota, U.S.
- Party: Republican
- Spouse: Dodi Truenow
- Children: 2

Military service
- Branch/service: United States Air Force

Keith L. Truenow (born August 9, 1969) is an American politician serving as a member of the Florida Senate from the 13th district since 2024. He previously served as a member of the Florida House of Representatives from the 31st and 26th districts from 2016–2024.

== Early life and education ==
Truenow was born in St. Cloud, Minnesota in 1969. He moved to Florida with his family in 1979 and graduated from Leesburg High School.

== Career ==
Truenow served in the United States Air Force. He later founded Lake Jem Farms. He was elected to the Florida House of Representatives in November 2020. After assuming office, he was assigned to the House Judiciary Committee and House Joint Legislative Auditing Committee. In February 2025, with the backing of state Agricultural Commissioner Wilton Simpson, Truenow filed a Senate bill to ban the addition of fluoride to drinking water in Florida. Florida's Chapter of the American Academy of Pediatrics has warned, "Insufficient fluoride exposure can have significant negative effects on oral health," and advises the "most common chronic disease in childhood...," disproportionately affects "children of lower socioeconomic status who are less likely to have access to dental care."
