= Dick Locke =

American politician (born 1947)

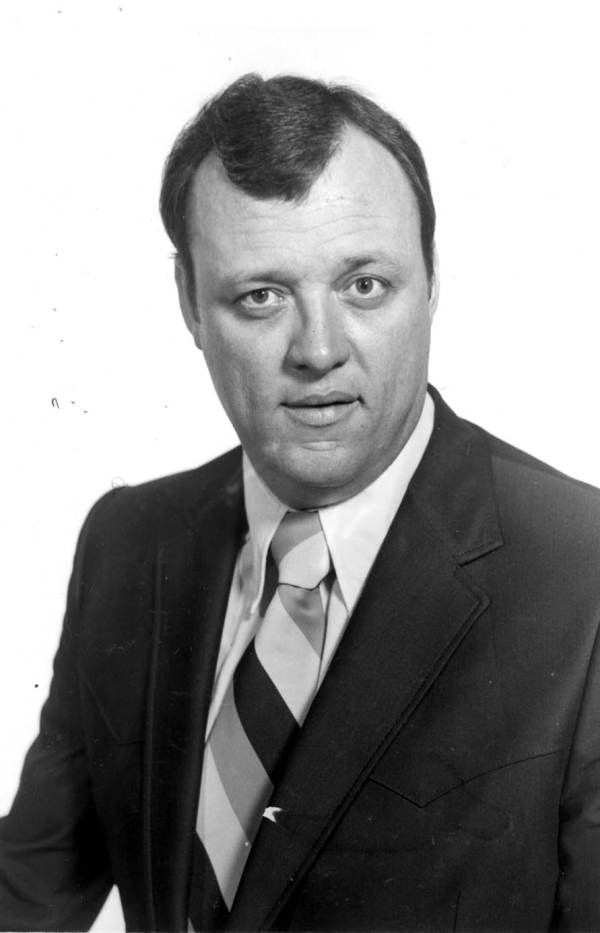

Member of the Florida House of Representatives from the 26th district
- In office November 2, 1982 – November 6, 1990
- Preceded by: Sidney Martin (redistricted)
- Succeeded by: Paul Hawkes

Personal details
- Born: February 6, 1947 (age 79) Tampa, Florida
- Party: Democratic
- Education: Central Florida Community College
- Occupation: Police investigator

Dick Locke (born February 6, 1947) is a Democratic politician from Florida who served as a member of the Florida House of Representatives from the 26th district from 1982 to 1990. Locke was born in Tampa, Florida, in 1947, and attended Central Florida Community College. He was an investigator for the Citrus County Sheriff's office, and was elected to the State House in 1982. Locke was defeated for re-election in 1990 by Republican Paul Hawkes.
