= Nan Cobb =

American politician

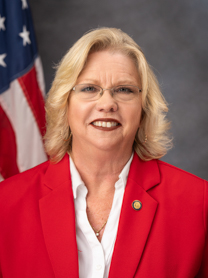
- Official portrait

Member of the Florida House of Representatives from the 26th district
- Incumbent
- Assumed office November 5, 2024
- Preceded by: Keith Truenow

Personal details
- Born: May 24, 1961 (age 65) Pompano Beach, Florida
- Party: Republican
- Spouse: Gerald "Jerry" Cobb
- Education: Lake Technical College
- Nickname: Nan

Nanette Lyn Cobb (born May 24, 1961) is an American businesswoman and Republican politician who has served as a member of the Florida House of Representatives for the 26th district since November 2024. She previously served on the Eustis City Commission from January 2021 until June 2024.

== Early life and education ==
Cobb was born in Pompano Beach, Florida. She attended Lyman High School, graduating in 1979, and studied nursery operations and floral design at Lake Technical College, where she obtained a Master Floral Designer certification.

She subsequently settled in Lake County, Florida, where she became involved in business and local civic organizations.

== Business career ==
Before entering elected office, Cobb worked as a business owner in Central Florida.

She has been identified as a co-owner with her husband, Gerald "Jerry" Cobb, of Cobb's Triangle Tractor, Inc., since 1997 and owner of Classic Tents & Events, LLC, since 2007.

== Civic involvement ==
Cobb has participated in several Lake County civic and business organizations, including the Lake Eustis Area Chamber of Commerce, Lake 100, the Lake County 4-H advisory board, and the Lake-Sumter State College Foundation.

She graduated from the Leadership Lake program in 2010 and has been involved with the Lake County Arts and Cultural Alliance and the Lake County Women's Hall of Fame committee.

== Political career ==
=== Eustis City Commission (2021–2024) ===
Cobb began serving on the Eustis City Commission in January 2021, occupying Seat 4. During her tenure, she advocated for improvements to municipal infrastructure and local quality-of-life initiatives.

On June 11, 2024, Cobb resigned from the commission to pursue election to the Florida House of Representatives. Her resignation was publicly announced by the City of Eustis on June 17, 2024.

=== Florida House of Representatives (2024–present) ===
Cobb was elected in 2024 to represent Florida's 26th House district, succeeding Republican Keith Truenow, who sought election to the Florida Senate.

She took office on November 5, 2024.

During the 2025 legislative session, Cobb sponsored bills addressing agriculture, manufacturing, surrendered infants, recreational fishing licenses, mental health, and property-owner liability.

Among her sponsored measures were House Bill 211, concerning farm products, and House Bill 791, concerning surrendered infants. Both measures became law in 2025.

Cobb has served on legislative committees and subcommittees dealing with state affairs, workforce development, health care facilities, intergovernmental affairs, justice, and collective bargaining.
