= Dwayne Taylor (politician) =

American politician

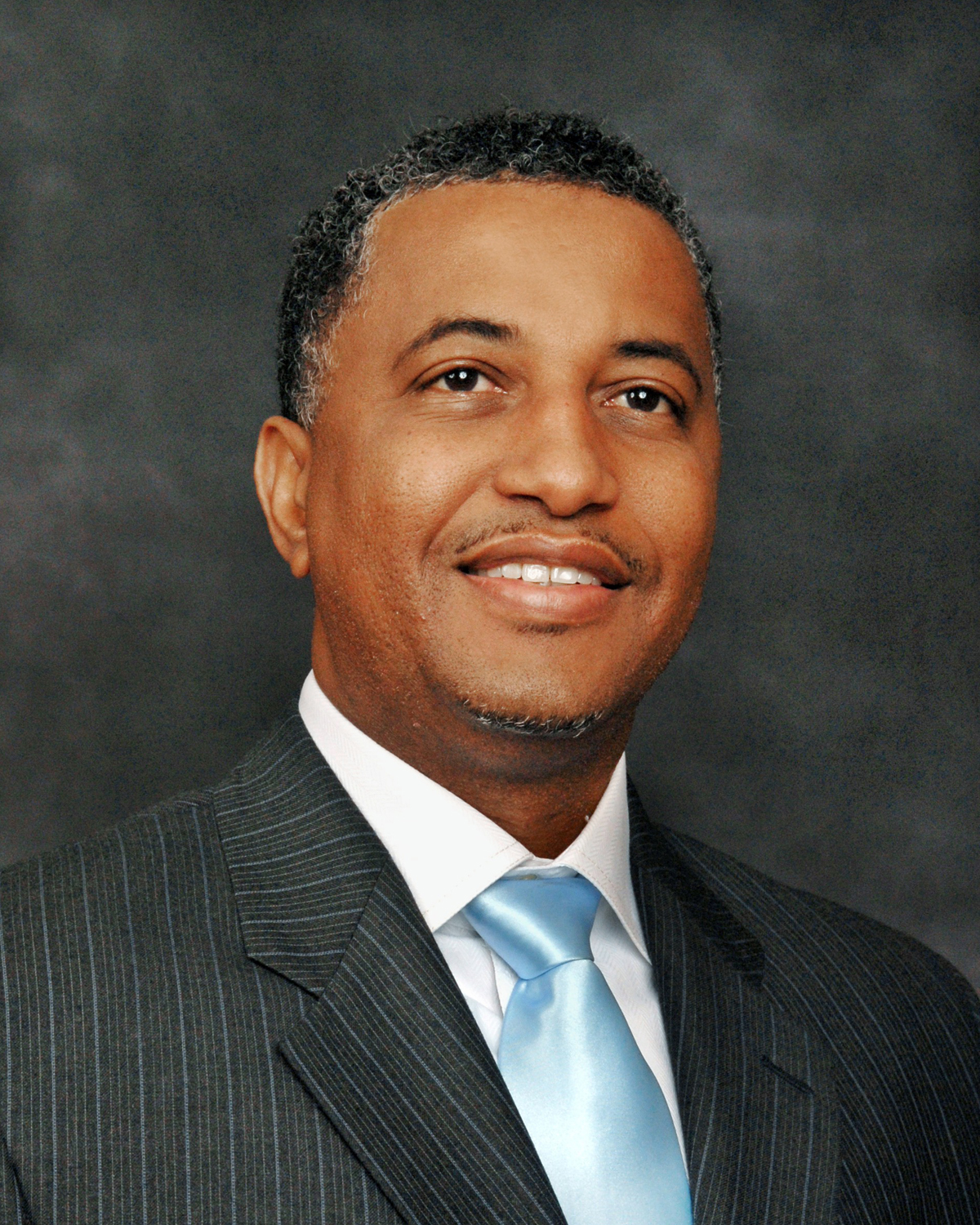

Member of the Florida House of Representatives
- In office November 4, 2008 – November 8, 2016
- Preceded by: Joyce Cusack
- Succeeded by: Patrick Henry
- Constituency: 27th district (2006–2012); 26th district (2012–2016)

Personal details
- Born: November 13, 1967 (age 58) Daytona Beach, Florida
- Party: Democratic
- Children: 3
- Education: Daytona State College (A.A.); University of Central Florida (B.S.) (M.P.A.)
- Profession: Writer/producer

Dwayne L. Taylor (born November 13, 1967) is a Democratic politician who currently serves as a member of the Florida House of Representatives, representing the 27th District from 2008 to 2012 and the 26th District, which stretches from Daytona Beach to DeLand in northern Volusia County, since 2012.

== History ==
Taylor was born in Daytona Beach and attended Daytona State College, where he received his associate degree. After graduation, he attended the University of Central Florida, where he received his bachelor's degree and his Master in Public Administration. In 2003, Taylor was elected to the Daytona Beach City Commission from Zone 3. In the primary election, he placed first, winning 35% of the vote to Steven Miller's 34% and Glenn G. Barnes's 31%. In the runoff election, he defeated Miller comfortably with 61% of the vote. Taylor was re-elected easily without serious opposition in 2005, and was re-elected without opposition in 2007. During the last few years of his service on the commission, he also served as Vice-Mayor of the city.

== Florida House of Representatives ==
In 2008, incumbent State Representative Joyce Cusack was unable to seek re-election due to term limits, so Taylor ran to succeed her in the 27th District, which stretched from Daytona Beach to DeLand in northern Volusia County. In the Democratic primary, he faced minister Terry Dilligard, Sr. and investigator Jake C. Ross, and he campaigned on both diversifying state revenue sources and on increasing funding for public education. and was re-elected without opposition in 2007. During the last few years of his service on the commission, he also served as Vice-Mayor of the city. Taylor ended up narrowly winning the primary, receiving 39% of the vote to Dilligard's 33% and Ross's 27%. He advanced to the general election, where he faced independent candidate Maureen Monahan, whom he was able to defeat in a landslide with 61% of the vote. In 2010, Taylor ran for re-election and was opposed by independent candidate Christopher Kennedy. Taylor noted that, despite the fact that the Republican-controlled legislature did not allow for votes on the passage of legislation that he authored, he was able to deliver "$2 million in assistance for the 2009 east Volusia flood victims." He ended up defeating Kennedy by a wide margin, winning with 58% of the vote.

In 2012, following the reconfiguration of state legislative districts, Taylor was drawn into the 26th District, which retained most of the territory that he had previously represented and, just like the previous district, stretches from Daytona Beach to DeLand in northern Volusia County. He was unopposed in both the Democratic primary and the general election, and won his third term in the legislature entirely uncontested. In 2014, Taylor ran for re-election to a fourth and final term in the legislature. He won the Democratic primary uncontested and faced Michael Cantu, a small business owner and the Republican nominee, in the general election. Taylor campaigned on his experience in the legislature, and noted his support for ending flood problems in Daytona Beach, increasing funding for public education, and working to provide assistance to Daytona State College and Embry-Riddle Aeronautical University. He ultimately ended up defeating Cantu by a narrow margin, winning 53% of the vote.

== Conviction ==
Taylor was convicted of wire fraud for using campaign funds for personal expenses such as a Mercedes Benz, trips, as well as everyday expenses. He was found guilty and sentenced to 13 months in prison.

== Congressional bid ==
As Taylor is unable to seek a fifth term to the legislature in 2016, he instead announced that he was running for Chair of Volusia County against Republican Jason Davis.

However, he decided instead to run for Congress in Florida's 6th congressional district where he resides.

Eventually, he became Daytona Beach City Commissioner.
