= Florida's 25th House of Representatives district =

American legislative district

Florida's 25th State House of Representatives district
Representative
Taylor Yarkosky; R–Clermont

Florida's 25th House of Representatives district elects one member of the Florida House of Representatives. It covers parts of Lake County.

== Members ==
- Dave Hood Jr. (2012–2014)
- Fred Costello (2014–2016)
- Tom Leek (2016–2022)
- Taylor Yarkosky (since 2022)
