= Florida's 28th House of Representatives district =

American legislative district

Florida's 28th State House of Representatives district
Representative
Bill Partington; R–Ormond Beach

Florida's 28th House of Representatives district elects one member of the Florida House of Representatives. It covers parts of Volusia County.

== Members ==
- Tom Leek (2022–2024)
- Bill Partington (since 2024)
