= Patrick Henry (Florida politician) =

Florida politician

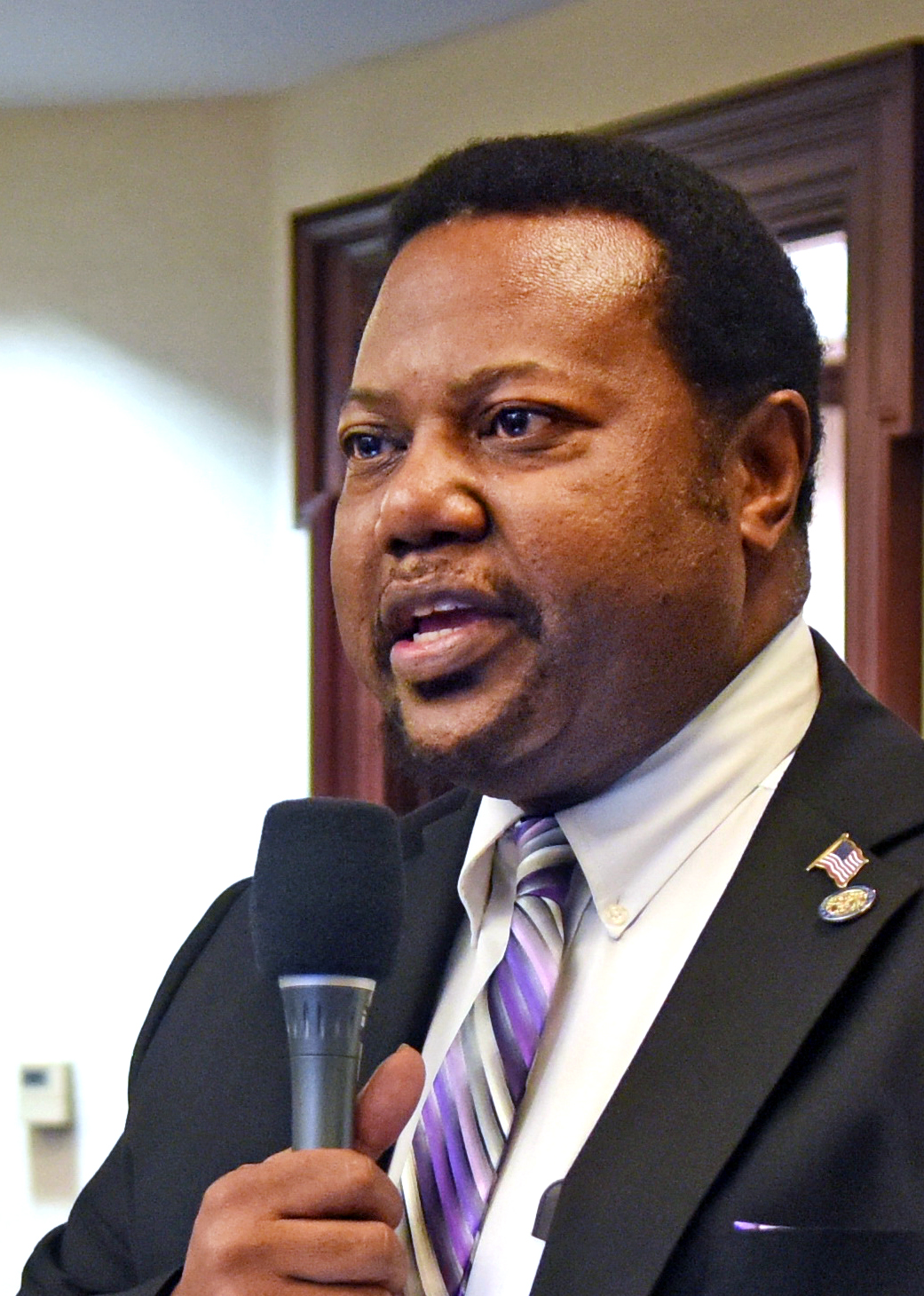

Member of the Florida House of Representatives from the 26th district
- In office November 8, 2016 – November 6, 2018
- Preceded by: Dwayne Taylor
- Succeeded by: Elizabeth Fetterhoff

Personal details
- Born: September 5, 1958 (age 68) Daytona Beach, Florida
- Party: Democratic
- Relatives: Derrick L. Henry (brother)
- Education: Bethune–Cookman University (B.A.)

Patrick Henry (born September 5, 1958) is a Democratic politician who served as a member of the Florida House of Representatives, representing the 26th District, which stretches from Daytona Beach to DeLand in northern Volusia County, from 2016 to 2018.

== History ==
Patrick Henry was born Centreville, Mississippi, and raised in Daytona Beach, Florida.

Henry's grandfather is Samuel O'Quinn, an African American businessman and landowner who was murdered in front of his home in Centreville. This incident was recounted by multiple sources, most notably in the book, Coming of Age in Mississippi, by Anne Moody.

Patrick Henry's brother, Derrick Henry, has been the sitting mayor of Daytona Beach, Florida since 2012. His sister, Dannette Henry, has been the Zone 5 Commissioner for Daytona Beach since 2016.

== Education ==
Henry graduated from Bethune-Cookman University with a degree in Sociology in 1982.

== Political career ==
Henry served as the Daytona Beach City Commissioner from 2010-2016 until he resigned to run for State Representative.

Henry succeeded term-limited Democrat Dwayne Taylor as the representative for District 26, when he defeated Republican nominee Michael Cantu in the 2016 General Election.

During his time in office, Henry secured almost $500 million in appropriation funding for projects in Volusia County. He worked in a bipartisan effort to pass legislation to replace a statue of a Confederate General with Dr. Mary McLeod Bethune. This honor made her the first African American to be chosen as one of two statues to represent a state in the United States Capitol.

Henry sponsored many pieces of legislation, and was a member of many committees and subcommittees, including the Agriculture & Property Rights Subcommittee; Government Accountability Committee; Agriculture and Natural Resources Appropriations Subcommittee; Health Innovation Subcommittee; Oversight, Transparency & Administration Subcommittee.

Henry narrowly lost his seat to Elizabeth Fetterhoff in the 2018 General Election, by 61 votes, which resulted in a recount, subsequently showing a 54 vote loss.

In 2019, Henry filed to run for the Florida House District 26 seat again. He secured the Democratic Party's nomination after defeating Evans Smith in the August 2020 primary election.
