= Pat Patterson (politician) =

American politician

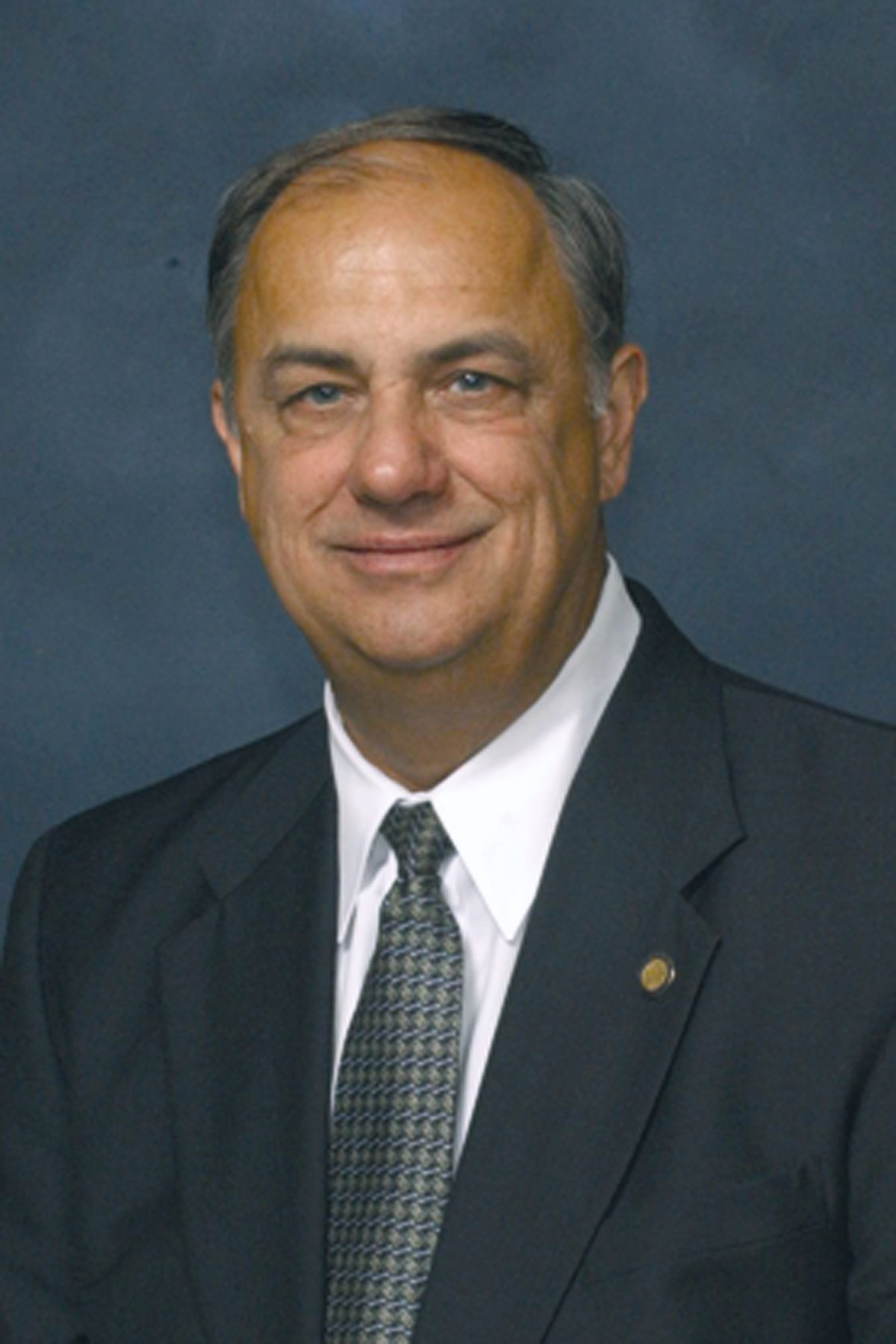

Member of the Florida House of Representatives from the 26th district district
- In office November 5, 2002 – November 2, 2010
- Preceded by: Evelyn Lynn (redistricting)
- Succeeded by: Fred Costello
- In office November 3, 1998 – November 7, 2000
- Preceded by: Earl Ziebarth
- Succeeded by: Joyce Cusack

Personal details
- Born: Ralph H. Patterson; October 12, 1948 (age 77) West Palm Beach, Florida, U.S.
- Party: Republican
- Spouse: Anne (Coggeshall) Patterson
- Children: 4
- Education: Florida Atlantic University (BA, MEd)
- Occupation: Insurance agent
- Website: Florida House Page

Military service
- Allegiance: United States of America
- Branch/service: United States Navy
- Years of service: 1969–1973

Ralph H. "Pat" Patterson is an American politician and insurance agent. He was a member of the Florida House of Representatives and a member of the Republican Party.

== Biography ==
Pat Patterson was born on October 12, 1948, in West Palm Beach.

Patterson served in the U.S. Navy from 1969 to 1973. He attended Florida Atlantic University, earning a B.A. in education in 1976 and taught in elementary school from 1976 to 1978. He earned a Master of Education degree in 1978. Since 1978, Patterson has been an insurance agent.

=== Political career ===
Patterson was a member of the Volusia County Council from 1995 to 1998, serving as Vice Chair in 1996 and chair in 1997.

Patterson was first elected to the Florida House of Representatives in November 1998 for a term of two years. He was defeated for re-election in 2000. He returned to the Florida House in November 2002 and was re-elected in 2004 and 2006.

He was appointed Chairman of the Committee on Community College and Workforce by House Speaker Allan Bense in 2004 and later appointed Chairman of the Committee on Ethics and Elections by House Speaker Marco Rubio in 2006.

He represents District 26, which consists of parts of Volusia and Flagler counties.

=== Personal ===
He is married to Anne and they are the parents of four children and seven grandchildren.
