= Paul Hawkes =

American politician and judge (born 1957)

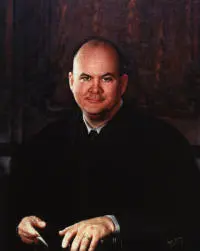

Judge of the First District Court of Appeal of Florida
- In office January 2, 2003 – January 4, 2012
- Preceded by: Charles E. Miner Jr.
- Succeeded by: Scott Makar

Member of the Florida House of Representatives
- In office November 6, 1990 – November 8, 1994
- Preceded by: Dick Locke
- Succeeded by: Helen Spivey
- Constituency: 26th district (1990–1992); 43rd district (1992–1994)

Personal details
- Born: March 6, 1957 (age 69) New London, Connecticut
- Party: Republican
- Spouse: Leslie K. Greer (m. 1975)
- Children: 5
- Education: University of South Florida; Florida State University College of Law (J.D.)
- Occupation: Attorney

Military service
- Allegiance: United States
- Branch/service: United States Air Force
- Years of service: 1975–1978

Paul M. Hawkes (born March 6, 1957) is a former judge from Florida who served on the First District Court of Appeal of Florida from 2003 to 2012. Prior to his judicial service, Hawkes was a member of the Florida House of Representatives from 1990 to 1994.

Hawkes was born in New London, Connecticut, and grew up in Cumberland, Maine. He graduated from the University of South Florida with his bachelor's degree in 1983 and from the Florida State University College of Law in 1985. Hawkes was an assistant state attorney in the Fifth Judicial Circuit from 1986 to 1988, when he unsuccessfully ran for the Florida House of Representatives from the 26th district. Hawkes won the Republican primary, but lost to incumbent Democrat Dick Locke. In 1990, in a rematch, Hawkes narrowly defeated Locke. After redistricting in 1992, he was re-elected to a second term in the 43rd district. He declined to seek a third term in 1994, and instead unsuccessfully ran for circuit judge.

After leaving the legislature, Hawkes practiced law in Crystal River. In 1996, he was appointed an advisor to State House Speaker Daniel Webster, and in 1998, was appointed by Webster to the Constitutional Revision Commission. Hawkes later served as the deputy director of the budget office under Governor Jeb Bush and the chief of policy to Speaker Tom Feeney.

In 2003, Hawkes was appointed by Bush to the First District Court of Appeal, succeeding Judge Charles E. Miner Jr., who retired. Hawkes was elected chief judge of the court in 2009, and pushed for the construction of a new courthouse. The courthouse was dubbed the "Taj Mahal courthouse" and attracted controversy for costing nearly $50 million. The Judicial Qualifications Commission filed a complaint against Hawkes with the Florida Supreme Court, alleging that Hawkes had engaged in "a pattern of conduct that can only be characterized as intemperate, impatient, undignified, and discourteous," citing allegations of misconduct related to the courthouse construction project. Hawkes resigned from the bench on January 4, 2012.
