= Seminole State Forest =

State forest in Florida, United States

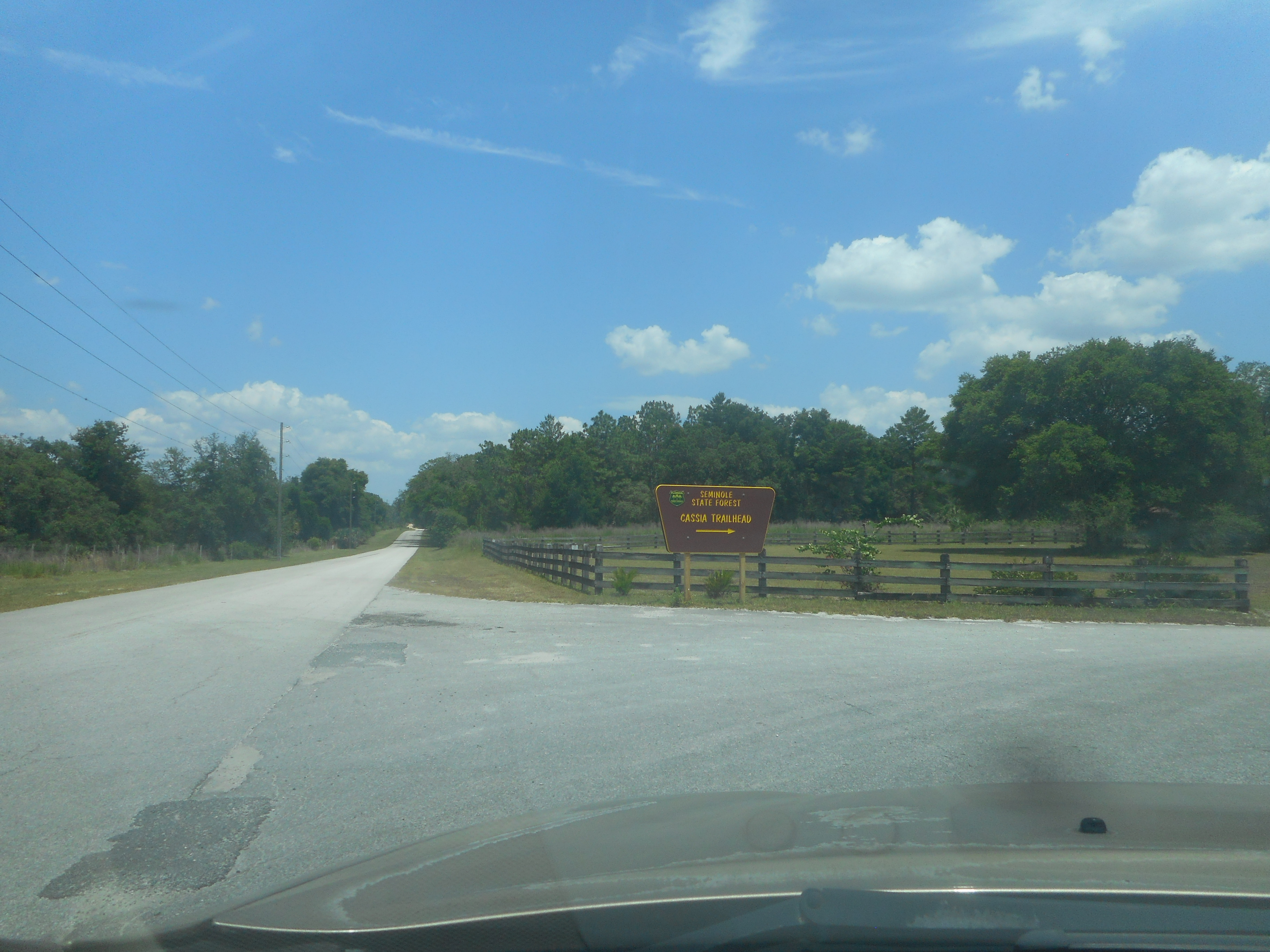
- Seminole State Forest State Forest signage

- Location within Florida
- Location: Lake County, Florida
- Nearest city: Tavares; Eustis.
- Coordinates: 28°52′7″N 81°27′39″W
- Area: 25,812 acres (10,446 ha)
- Governing body: Florida Department of Environmental Protection

The Seminole State Forest is in the U.S. state of Florida. The 25,812-acre (10,446 ha) forest is located in Central Florida, near Eustis. Access to the forest is available from Florida State Road 44, Lake County Road 46A and Florida State Road 46. Surrounding parks and preserved areas include Lower Wekiva River Preserve State Park, Rock Springs Run State Reserve, Lake Norris Conservation Area, and the Ocala National Forest. The Florida National Scenic Trail runs through the forest from southeast to northwest.

Black Water Creek crosses the forest, while the Wekiva River forms part of its eastern boundary. The forest contains 18 named springs.

== See also ==
- List of Florida state forests
- List of Florida state parks
