= Derrick L. Henry =

American politician

Derrick Henry
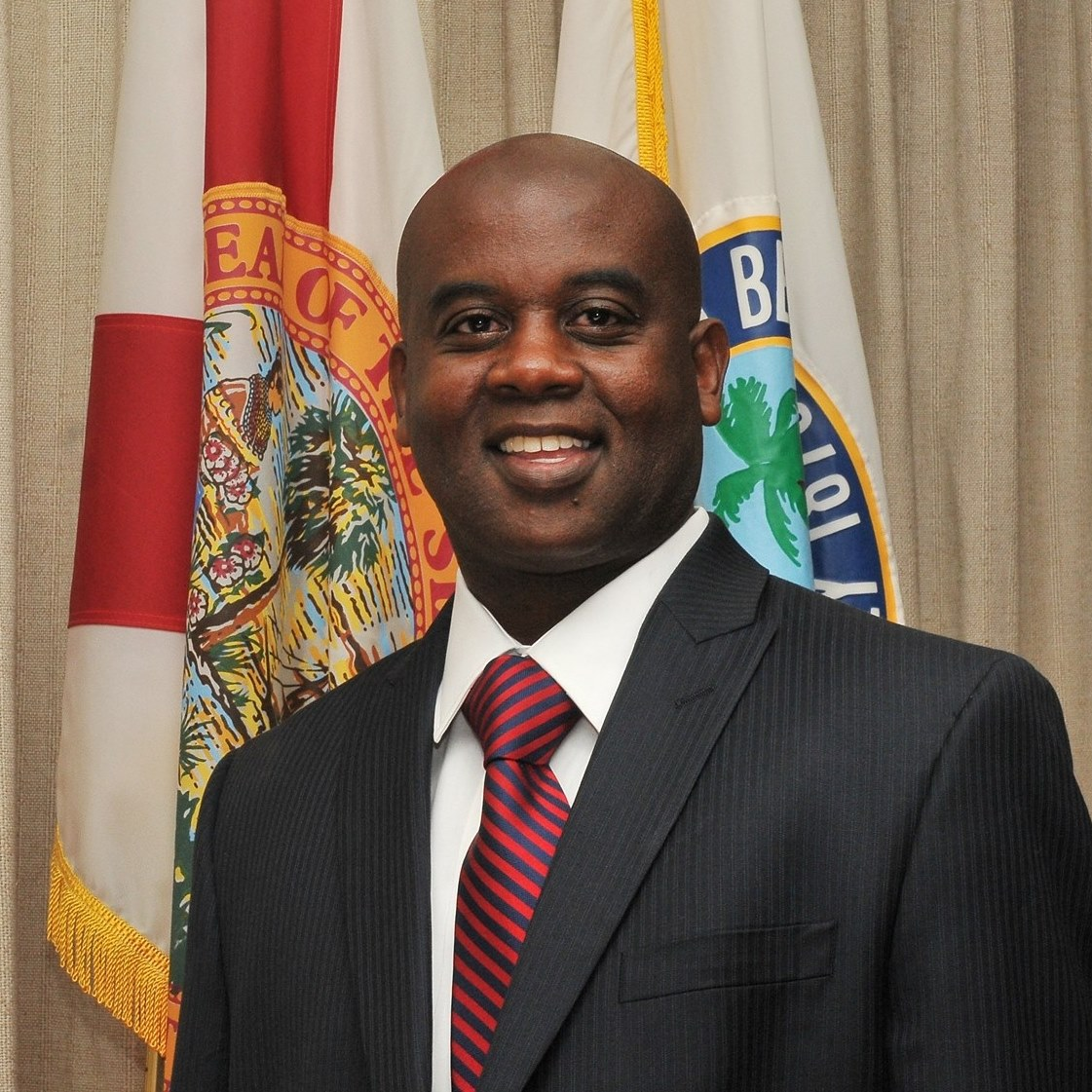
- Official portrait, 2021

Mayor of Daytona Beach
- Incumbent
- Assumed office 2012
- Preceded by: Glenn Ritchey

Member of the Daytona Beach City Commission from Zone 5
- In office 2009–2012

Personal details
- Born: Daytona Beach, Florida
- Party: Democratic
- Spouse: Stephanie Henry
- Children: 3
- Relatives: Patrick Henry (brother)
- Education: Rollins College (BA); Stetson University (MEd)

Derrick L. Henry is an American politician who has served as the mayor of Daytona Beach, Florida, since 2012. A member of the Democratic Party, he previously served as a member of the Daytona Beach City Commission from 2009 to 2012. He is the second African American mayor of Daytona Beach.

== Early life and education ==
Derrick Henry was born and raised in Daytona Beach. He attended Mainland High School where he was elected class president his junior and senior year. He later attended Rollins College, earning a bachelor's degree in philosophy and psychology, before later graduating from Stetson University with a masters in educational leadership. Henry served in several educational and administrative positions throughout his career and time as mayor.

== Political career ==
Henry was first elected to the Daytona Beach City Commission, before running for mayor in 2012. He campaigned on the slogan "One City, One Vision," where he argued in favor of business development aimed at improving the city's quality of life. Upon his election he transitioned from previous administrations and aimed to increase the number of visitors and tourists to the area. He has also aimed at improving the city's economy. Since taking office he has presided over a significant increase in the city's population. Infrastructure policies and urban projects has been a central piece of the mayors goals as has park renovations. During the COVID-19 pandemic he pushed for mask mandates throughout Daytona Beach. During his time as mayor it was learned that his grandfather was cousins with Arthur Henry, an African American man who was lynched in Orlando, Florida, in 1925. Derrick Henry's maternal grandfather, a civil rights activist, had also been lynched in the 1950's.

== Personal life ==
Derrick Henry is married to Stephanie Henry and has 3 kids. In 2017 it was reported that Stephanie Henry had been charged for petit theft from a beauty parlor following an altercation over the stores return policy. However the state attorney declined to prosecute the case. Derrick Henry's brother Patrick Henry has previously served as a member of the Florida House of Representatives. His sister, Dannette Henry, currently serves as a member of the Daytona Beach City Commission.
