= Lake Joanna =

Lake in the state of Florida, United States

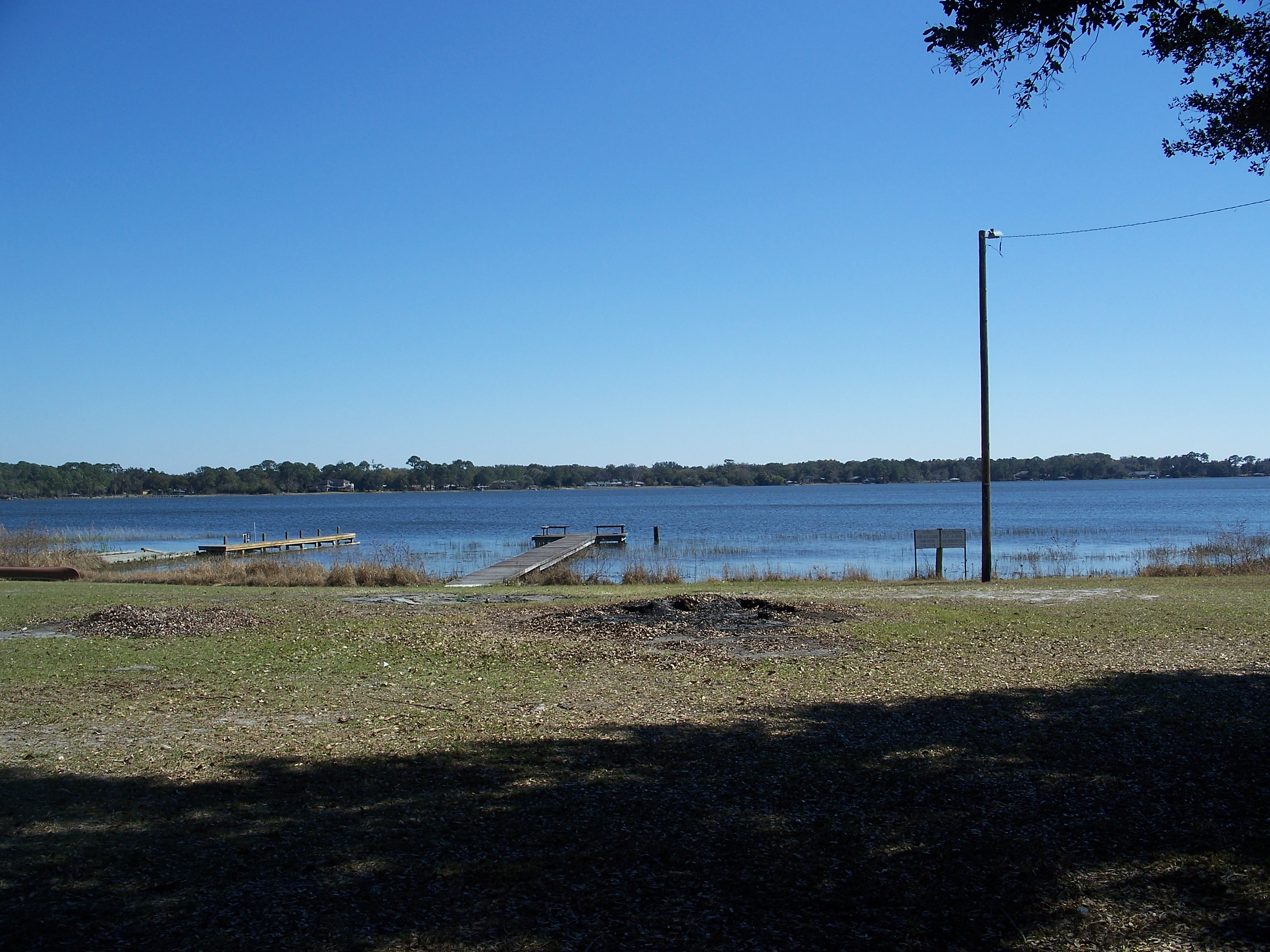
- Western part of lake

- Location within Florida Location within the United States
- Location: Lake County, Florida
- Coordinates: 28°50′30″N 81°38′43″W
- Basin countries: United States
- Max. length: 1.7 km (1.1 mi)
- Max. width: 0.9 km (0.56 mi)
- Surface area: 135.46 ha (334.7 acres)

Lake Joanna is a spring-fed lake in Lake County, Florida. It occupies an area of 334.74 acres.
