= Tom Leek =

American politician

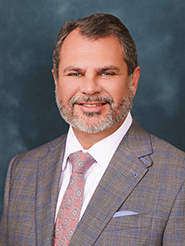

Member of the Florida Senate from the 7th district
- Incumbent
- Assumed office November 5, 2024
- Preceded by: Travis Hutson

Member of the Florida House of Representatives
- In office November 8, 2016 – November 5, 2024
- Preceded by: Fred Costello
- Succeeded by: Bill Partington
- Constituency: 25th (2016–2022); 28th (2022–2024)

Personal details
- Born: Thomas J. Leek; August 6, 1968 (age 57) Columbus, Ohio, U.S.
- Party: Republican
- Spouse: Michelle Leek
- Children: 2
- Education: University of Central Florida (BA); Stetson University (JD)

Thomas J. Leek (born August 6, 1968) is an American politician and attorney who has served as a member of the Florida Senate from the 7th district since 2024, representing all of St. Johns, Putnam, and Flagler County, as well as northern parts of Volusia County. Previously, he served in the Florida House of Representatives from the 25th district from 2016 to 2024.
