= Dave Hood Jr. =

American politician (1954–2019)

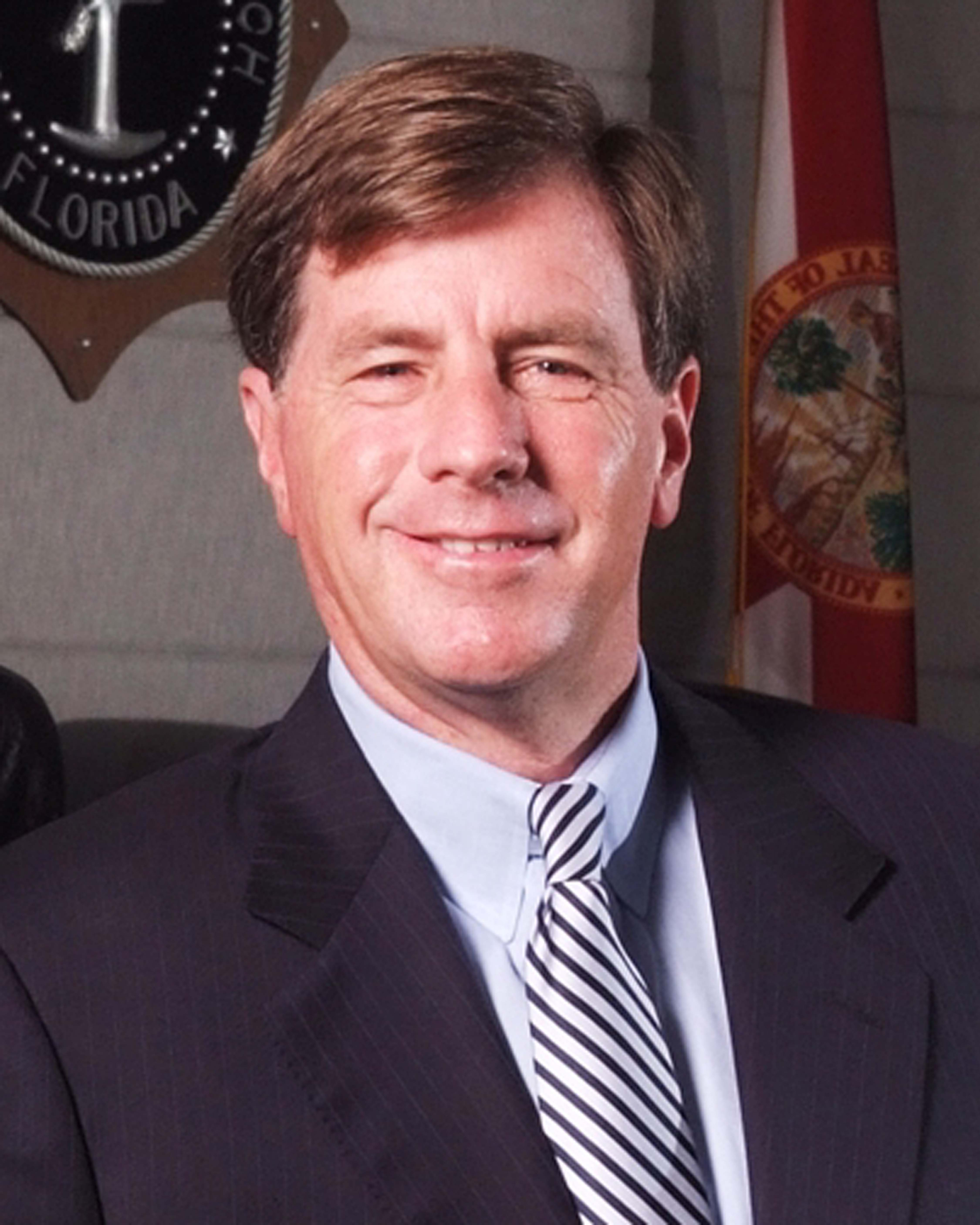

Member of the Florida House of Representatives from the 25th district
- In office November 20, 2012 – September 30, 2014
- Preceded by: Larry Metz
- Succeeded by: Fred Costello

Personal details
- Born: Charles David Hood Jr. April 24, 1954 Fort Polk, Louisiana, U.S.
- Died: March 15, 2019 (aged 64) Ormond Beach, Florida, U.S.
- Party: Republican
- Spouse: Lorraine Hood
- Children: 5
- Education: University of South Carolina (B.A.); University of South Carolina Law Center (J.D.)
- Profession: Attorney

Charles David Hood Jr. (April 24, 1954 – March 15, 2019) was a Republican politician who served as a judge on the Seventh Judicial Circuit of Florida. Prior to his appointment to the Circuit in 2014, he served in the Florida House of Representatives, representing the 25th District, which included eastern Volusia County, including Ormond Beach, Daytona Beach Shores, Port Orange, Ponce Inlet, and New Smyrna Beach, from 2012 to 2014.

== History ==
Hood moved to Florida in 1978 and began work as an attorney, and he became a partner in the law firm of Smith, Hood, Stout, Bigman & Brock, P.A. From 1992 to 1994, he served as an Ormond Beach City Commissioner, and from 1994 to 1999, as the Mayor of Ormond Beach, though he lived in Daytona Beach Shores. He died from brain cancer in 2019.

== Florida House of Representatives ==
Following the reconfiguration of Florida House of Representatives districts in 2012, Hood opted to run in the newly created 25th District. He won the nomination of the Republican Party unopposed, and easily defeated independent candidate Christina Spencer-Kephart in the general election, winning 61% of the vote.

During the 2012–2014 legislative session, Hood supported legislation proposed by Katie Edwards that gives judges more leniency when determining sentences for drug offenders, saying, "We're only talking about the first offenders, non-violent, no prior history, and what we're doing is putting the discretion in the one person in the courtroom...the impartial observer: the judge."

== Seventh Judicial Circuit Court of Florida ==
Rather than seek re-election in 2014, Hood instead opted to run for a seat on the Seventh Judicial Circuit of Florida, and he was initially set to run against Michael Orfinger. However, when Judge David B. Beck decided to retire from the bench, Governor Rick Scott appointed Hood to replace him on the Seventh Circuit. Hood ended his campaign against Orfinger, and on September 30, 2014, following his appointment to the bench, he resigned from the legislature.

On August 30, 2016, he lost reelection to the circuit court being defeated by A. "Kathleen" McNeilly by a vote of 63,727 to 80,481.
