= Daytona State College =

Public college in Daytona Beach, Florida, US

- Former names: Daytona Beach Junior College (1957–1971); Daytona Beach Community College (1971–2008)
- Motto: Scientia potentia est (Latin)
- Motto in English: "Knowledge is power"
- Type: Public college
- Established: 1957; 69 years ago
- Parent institution: Florida College System
- Accreditation: SACS
- Endowment: $17 million (2024)
- Budget: $102.6 million (2024)
- President: Thomas LoBasso
- Faculty: 223 (full-time); 575 (part-time)
- Undergraduates: 11,584 (fall 2022)
- Location: Daytona Beach, Florida, United States; 29.2016°N 81.0513°W
- Campus: Small city
- Colors: Blue, dark blue, and silver
- Nickname: Falcons
- Sporting affiliations: NJCAA Region 8 – Mid-Florida Conference
- Mascot: Freddie the Falcon
- Website: www.daytonastate.edu

Daytona State College (DSC) is a public college in Daytona Beach, Florida, United States. It is part of the Florida College System.

== History ==
Established by the Florida Legislature in 1957 as Daytona Beach Junior College, the college initially operated as a division of Volusia County Schools. It was one of Florida's first comprehensive colleges. In 1968, the college's administrative structure was reformed into an independent District Board of Trustees. Renamed Daytona Beach Community College in 1971, it became a four-year institution in 2006 and was renamed "Daytona State College" in 2008 to reflect its expanded degree offerings.

== Campuses ==
Daytona State College operates multiple campuses in Volusia and Flagler counties, each offering a range of programs and facilities tailored to their respective communities.

=== Daytona Beach Campus ===
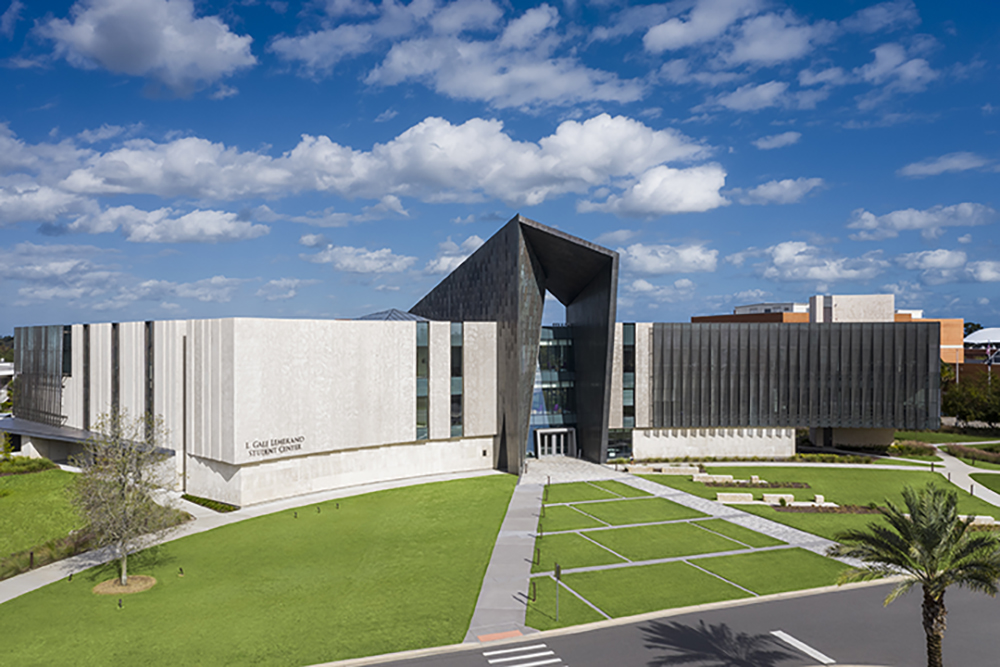
Gale L. Lemerand Student Center on the Daytona Beach Campus

The Daytona Beach Campus is the original and largest campus of Daytona State College. It opened in 1957 following authorization by the Florida Legislature to establish Daytona Beach Junior College as one of the state’s first comprehensive community colleges. In 1965, Volusia County Community College – one of Florida’s 12 black community colleges and a separate institution under the school system – was merged into DBJC. The college was renamed Daytona Beach Community College in 1971 and became Daytona State College in 2008, reflecting its transition to a four-year institution offering bachelor's degrees.

Located on 115 acres in Daytona Beach near the Daytona International Speedway, the campus serves more than 18,000 students annually. It offers bachelor’s degrees, Associate of Arts (university transfer) and Associate of Science degrees, adult education, and workforce certificate programs. The campus supports select degree programs in partnership with the University of Central Florida.

The campus houses the college's primary administrative offices and several major facilities, including the Southeast Museum of Photography, the Mori Hosseini College of Hospitality and Culinary Management, Falcon Athletics (NJCAA Division I), a fitness center and indoor pool, the student-run television station WDSC-TV 15, the L. Gale Lemerand Student Center, and a 256-bed student residence hall.

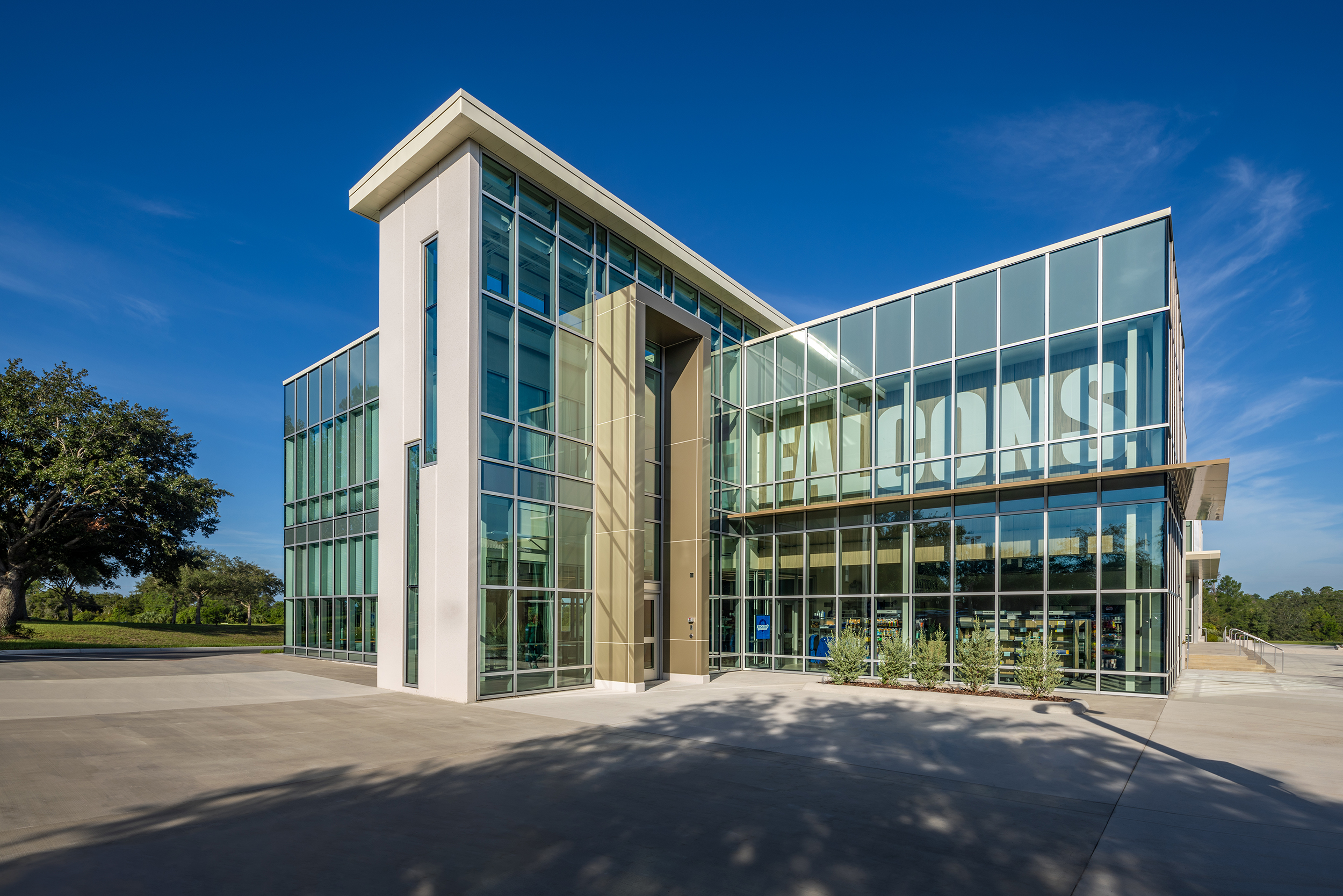
Classroom Building on the Deltona Campus

=== DeLand Campus ===
The DeLand Campus opened in 1987 in a converted supermarket and moved to its current 103-acre location in 1981. Serving approximately 2,100 students, the campus offers academic and workforce programs. The campus is also the home of the college's Law Enforcement Academy firearms and vehicle operations training.

=== Deltona Campus ===
The Deltona Campus opened in 2004 on a 100-acre site in West Volusia County. Serving approximately 1,600 students, the campus offers academic and workforce programs. In 2024, the campus expanded with the opening of a new 30,000 square foot classroom, laboratory, and advanced manufacturing building. The facility supports an expanded Nursing program and the Diagnostic Medical Sonography and CNC Machining programs.

=== Flagler/Palm Coast Campus ===
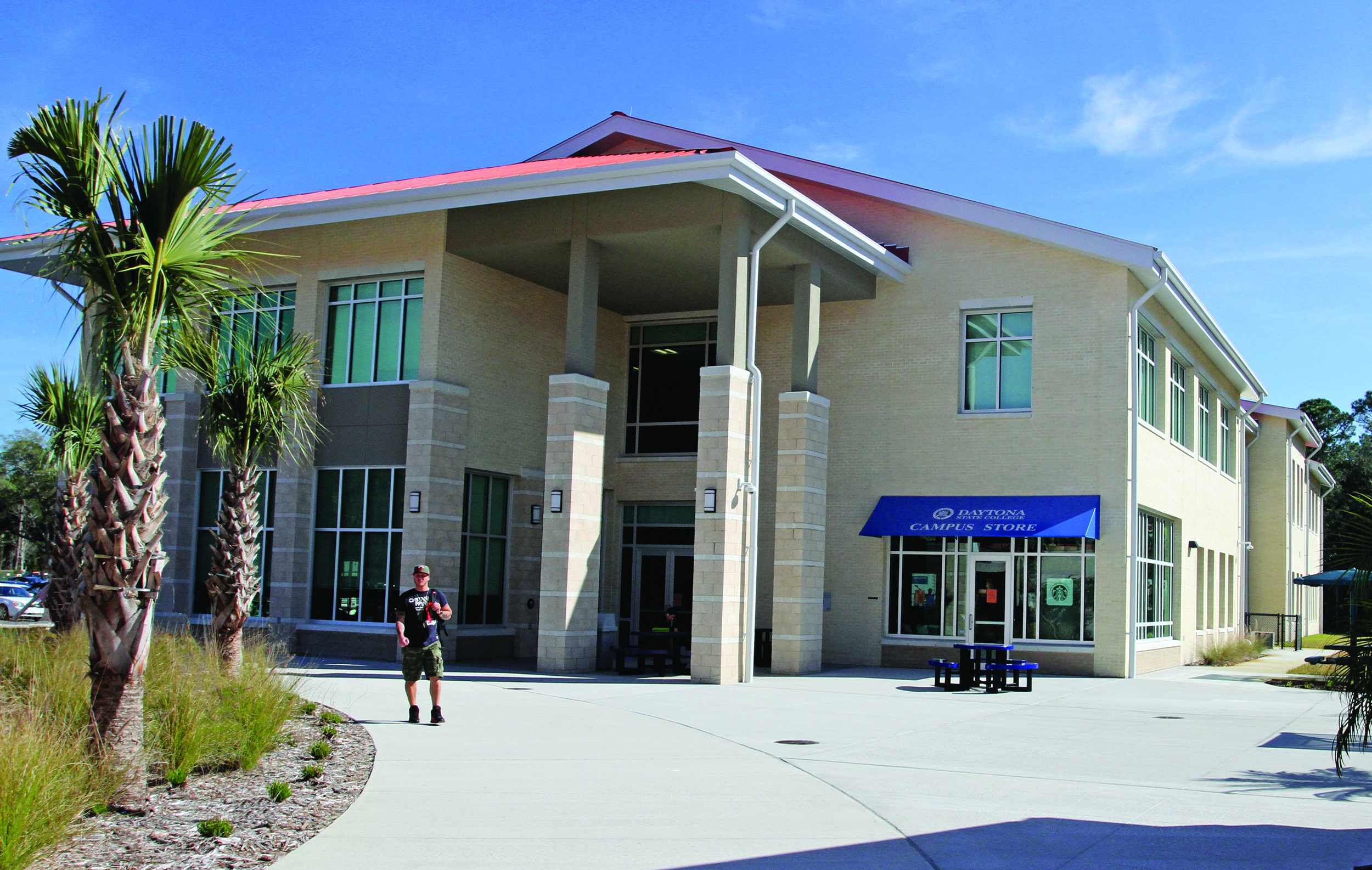
Flagler/Palm Coast Campus

The Flagler/Palm Coast Campus opened in 1979 as the Flagler County Center in the Palm Harbor Shopping Center before transitioning to its current home on a 100-acre site in Palm Coast in Flagler County. Serving approximately 1,400 students, the campus offers academic and workforce programs. Students can complete prerequisites for the Associate of Science degree Business Administration on campus with core requirements available online. The campus is also home to a Paramedic Certificate program.

The campus is home to the Alan Smolen Amphitheatre, a cultural centerpiece that hosts community events throughout the year, including the annual Palm Coast Songwriters Festival.

=== New Smyrna Beach/Edgewater Campus ===
New Smyrna Beach/Edgewater Campus opened in 1978 on a 93-acre site in New Smyrna Beach, serving approximately 1,000 students in southern Volusia County. The campus offers a variety of academic and workforce programs that can be completed entirely on site, including an Associate of Arts (university transfer) degree; Associate of Science degrees in Nursing and GED preparation.

=== Advanced Technology College ===
Opened in 2001, Daytona State’s Advanced Technology College (ATC) serves approximately 2,200 students on a 25-acre site and is a hub for the College’s engineering, computer science and Career and Technical Education programs. It houses the Mary Karl College of Workforce & Continuing Education’s School of Workforce Training, the School of Computer Science and the Angela & D.S. Patel School of Engineering Technology and is the current home of the Charles M. Curb School of Emergency Services as it transitions to the DeLand Campus.

=== DSC News-Journal Center ===
Acquired by Daytona State College in 2009, the News-Journal Center serves approximately 125 students and is home to the College’s Music Production Technology program and the Mike Curb College of Music, Entertainment & Art offering programs in dance, music, studio arts and theater.

== Academics ==
Daytona State College offers more than 100 academic programs, including certificate, associate and bachelor's degree options. In some instances, programs of study are formally linked to nationwide programs. For example, the college hosts the Florida Sunshine Chapter of the Federation for Advanced Manufacturing Education, the first program of its kind in the state. This initiative, a partnership between Daytona State and local manufacturers, connects students in the Associate of Science in Engineering Technology program with paid, hands-on experience over the course of five semesters during which students split their time between the classroom and workforce.

== Athletics ==
Daytona State College fields four men’s teams – baseball, basketball, cross country and soccer; seven women’s teams – basketball, cross country, flag football, golf, soccer, softball and volleyball; and one co-ed program in esports.

The Falcons compete in National Junior College Athletic Association (NJCAA) Region 8 and the Citrus Conference (formerly the Mid-Florida Conference) while the esports teams compete in NJCAA Esports (NJCAAE) competition. As of July 2025, the College has claimed 12 NJCAA national championships, including titles in women’s soccer and women’s golf. The esports team has earned three NJCAAE national championships – one in Super Smash Bros. Ultimate and two in Rocket League.

The college has been selected multiple times to host NJCAA national championships in golf and soccer.

== Notable alumni ==
- Herbert L. Becker, actor, magician, entertainer, and author
- Tiffany Chan, professional golfer and Olympian
- Joyce Cusack, former member of the Florida House of Representatives
- Richard Gibbs, film composer and music producer
- Solomon Jones, former NBA player
- Brian Kelley, member of Florida Georgia Line
- Justin Lawrence, pitcher for the Colorado Rockies
- Pat Meyers, LPGA golfer
- Clay Pickering, former NFL player
- Hal Prewitt, artist, photographer, entrepreneur, and inventor
- Dwayne Taylor, former member of the Florida House of Representatives
- Jamie Watson, former professional soccer player for Orlando City SC
- Yutaro Tsukada, professional soccer player
- Phoenix Sanders, baseball pitcher for the San Francisco Giants
