= Wildwood, Florida =

- City
- City of Wildwood
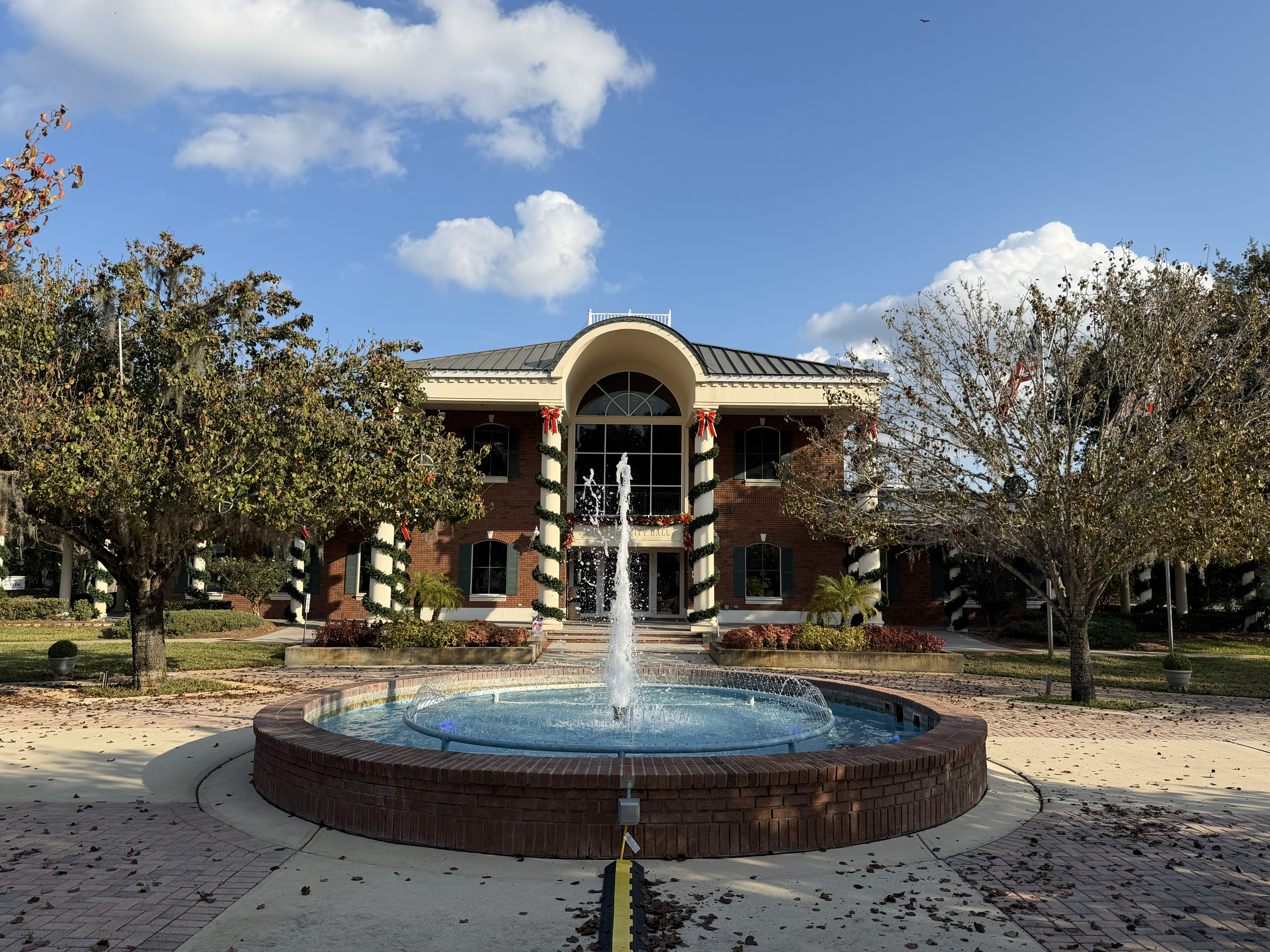
- Wildwood City Hall

- Logo

- Location in Sumter County and the state of Florida
- Coordinates: 28°49′30″N 82°01′49″W
- Country: United States
- State: Florida
- County: Sumter

Area
  - Total: 57.37 sq mi (148.59 km^{2})
  - Land: 56.28 sq mi (145.77 km^{2})
  - Water: 1.09 sq mi (2.82 km^{2})
- Elevation: 85 ft (26 m)

Population (2020)
  - Total: 15,730
  - Density: 279.5/sq mi (107.91/km^{2})
- Time zone: UTC-5 (Eastern (EST))
  - Summer (DST): UTC-4 (EDT)
- ZIP code: 34785
- Area code: 352
- FIPS code: 12-77675
- GNIS feature ID: 2405745
- Website: www.wildwood-fl.gov

Wildwood is a city in Sumter County, Florida, United States. Its population was 15,730 at the 2020 census.

== History ==
A post office called Wildwood has been in operation since 1881. The city was named for its remote location in the woods.

In April 2015, The Villages petitioned the city of Wildwood with plans to build 785 new homes on County Road 466A, across from Pinellas Plaza. Wildwood leaders rejected the expansion efforts, citing concerns of the city losing its identity when it was to become overwhelmed by The Villages. On April 27, 2015, The Villages formally withdrew their plans for expansion, indicating that the City of Wildwood officials made too many requests that would be a “disservice to our residents and business partners". Further plans for expansion of The Villages into the city of Wildwood are not public.

The city also includes the historic community of Orange Home.

== Geography ==
According to the United States Census Bureau, the city has a total area of 13.4 km^{2} (5.2 sq mi).

== Demographics ==
Historical population
Census	Pop.	Note	%±
1890	419		—
1900	244		−41.8%
1910	329		34.8%
1920	480		45.9%
1930	1,409		193.5%
1940	1,346		−4.5%
1950	2,019		50.0%
1960	2,170		7.5%
1970	2,082		−4.1%
1980	2,665		28.0%
1990	3,421		28.4%
2000	3,924		14.7%
2010	6,709		71.0%
2020	15,730		134.5%
2025 (est.)	19,436		23.6%
U.S. Decennial Census

=== Racial and ethnic composition ===
Wildwood racial composition (Hispanics excluded from racial categories) (NH = Non-Hispanic)
Race	Pop 2010	Pop 2020	% 2010	% 2020
White (NH)	4,754	12,210	70.86%	77.62%
Black or African American (NH)	1,378	1,489	20.54%	9.47%
Native American or Alaska Native (NH)	27	21	0.40%	0.13%
Asian (NH)	75	412	1.12%	2.62%
Pacific Islander or Native Hawaiian (NH)	3	3	0.04%	0.02%
Some other race (NH)	16	39	0.24%	0.25%
Multiracial (NH)	83	462	1.24%	2.94%
Hispanic or Latino (any race)	373	1,094	5.56%	6.95%
Total	6,709	15,730	100.00%	100.00%

=== 2020 census ===
As of the 2020 census, Wildwood had a population of 15,730. The median age was 62.5 years. 11.6% of residents were under the age of 18 and 43.5% of residents were 65 years of age or older. For every 100 females there were 84.9 males, and for every 100 females age 18 and over there were 82.6 males age 18 and over.

96.9% of residents lived in urban areas, while 3.1% lived in rural areas.

There were 7,663 households in Wildwood, of which 13.9% had children under the age of 18 living in them. Of all households, 51.7% were married-couple households, 13.7% were households with a male householder and no spouse or partner present, and 29.1% were households with a female householder and no spouse or partner present. About 31.4% of all households were made up of individuals and 20.6% had someone living alone who was 65 years of age or older.

There were 10,125 housing units, of which 24.3% were vacant. The homeowner vacancy rate was 9.7% and the rental vacancy rate was 16.0%.

=== 2010 census ===
As of the 2010 United States census, 6,709 people, 2,542 households, and 1,752 families lived in the city.

=== 2000 census ===
As of the 2000 census, 3,924 people, 1,640 households, and 1,074 families resided in the city. The population density was 759.7 inhabitants per square mile (293.3/km^{2}). The 2,062 housing units had an average density of 399.2 units per square mile (154.1 units/km^{2}). The racial makeup of the city was 64.76% White, 32.93% African American, 0.13% Native American, 0.13% Asian, 0.97% from other races, and 1.10% from two or more races. Hispanics or Latinos of any race were 2.42% of the population.

Of the 1,640 households, 23.0% had children under 18 living with them, 44.6% were married couples living together, 17.2% had a female householder with no husband present, and 34.5% were not families. About 30.8% of all households were made up of individuals, and 20.2% had someone living alone who was 65 or older. The average household size was 2.28 and the average family size was 2.81.

In the city, the population distribution was 22.3% under 18, 6.5% from 18 to 24, 18.4% from 25 to 44, 19.0% from 45 to 64, and 33.8% who were 65 or older. The median age was 48 years. For every 100 females, there were 83.2 males. For every 100 females 18 and over, there were 79.2 males.

The median income in the city for a household was $23,357 and for a family was $27,247. Males had a median income of $23,250 versus $18,103 for females. The per capita income for the city was $11,758. About 17.3% of families and 21.7% of the population were below the poverty line, including 39.6% of those under 18 and 8.1% of those 65 or over.

== Transportation ==
=== Crossroads of Florida ===
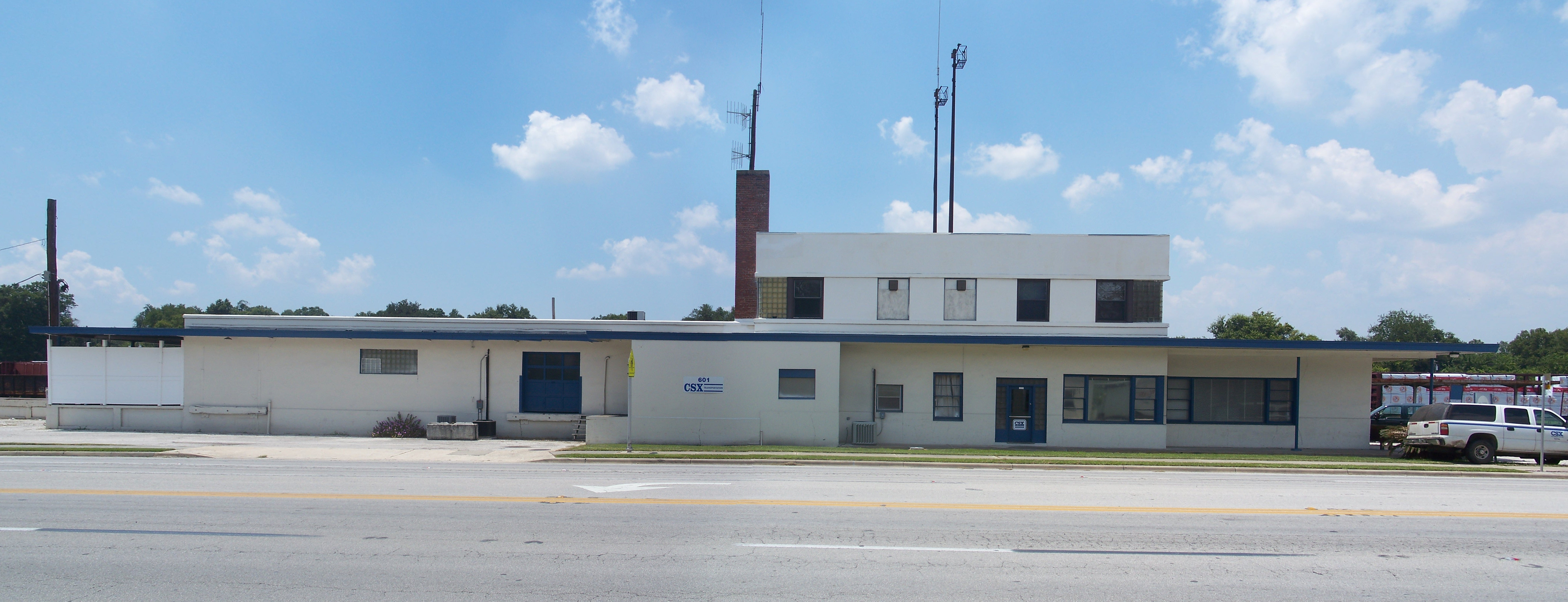
Old railroad station

Wildwood is located at the junction of Interstate 75, Florida's Turnpike, State Road 44, and U.S. Route 301. For many years, Wildwood was the northern control city on turnpike road signs, but this was replaced with Ocala beginning in 2007. Because of its centralized location and easy access to both coasts, it is often referred to as "the Crossroads of Florida". Wildwood station operates as a CSX maintenance yard, and until 2004, was served by Amtrak's Palmetto between New York City and Tampa. Amtrak's Amtrak Thruway bus service makes a stop in Wildwood. The bus travels from Jacksonville to Dade City and is timed to meet arrivals and departures of the Silver Star train in Jacksonville. The Florida Midland Railroad owns an abandoned railroad spur that once led to Leesburg, but now solely serves as a home for several abandoned freight cars along County Road 44A.

In the late 20th century, Wildwood served as a division point and rail yard for the Seaboard Air Line Railroad (SAL), and later the Seaboard Coast Line (SCL) and Seaboard System Railroads. SAL, SCL, and Amtrak passenger trains from New York City and the Midwest were split and combined here to serve St. Petersburg and Miami until the 1990s. Wildwood continues to host Wildwood Yard, which is now used by CSX Transportation, a successor to the Seaboard.

== Notable people ==
- Wayne Anderson, racing driver
- Elizabeth Cook, country music singer and radio personality
- Ron Dixon, former player of the National Football League
- Dana Fuchs, singer, songwriter, actress, and voice-over artist, portrayed Sadie in 2007 film Across the Universe
- Ellis Johnson, former player of the National Football League
- Dan Sikes, former professional golfer
- Barbara J. Stephenson, diplomat
