= Florida's 26th House of Representatives district =

American legislative district

Florida's 26th State House of Representatives district
Representative
Nan Cobb; R–Tavares

Florida's 26th House of Representatives district elects one member of the Florida House of Representatives. It covers parts of Lake County.

== Members ==
- Keith Truenow (2022–2024)
- Nan Cobb (since 2024)
