= List of county roads in Sumter County, Florida =

- County road shields used in Florida

Highway names
- Interstates: Interstate X (I-X)
- US Highways: U.S. Highway X (US X)
- State: State Road X (SR X)
- County: County Road X (CR X)

System links
- County roads in Florida; County roads in Sumter County

The following is a list of county roads in Sumter County, Florida. All county roads are maintained by the county in which they reside; however, only a fraction are marked with standard MUTCD-approved county road shields.

Most rural roads in Sumter County have been assigned county road numbers rather than names. Few of these are included in the list; most routes below are former state roads.

== County Road 44A ==
County Road 44A
- Location: Wildwood-Orange Home

County Road 44A exists along the north side of State Road 44 in Wildwood and Orange Home, and was formerly designated as SR 44A. The road begins southeast of the interchange with Interstate 75, and instantly intersects with CR 225, which runs north and south, while CR 44A runs directly east and west until it curves slightly to the right and becomes Kilgore Street. The road then moves south onto Central Avenue running parallel to the CSX line until reaching Lynum Street, and crosses the tracks until Lynum Street terminates at US 301. County Road 44A then not only crosses US 301 to enter Huey Street, but the wye for the former Leesburg and Tavares railroad line. One block away, CR 44A breaks away from Huey Street and curves south before running along the north side of the right-of-way of the previously mentioned abandoned railroad line. The line contained a series of abandoned freight cars until the 2000s (decade), and the road and railroad line followed each other until CR 44A terminates at a recreational vehicle park in Orange Home.

== County Road 48 ==
County Road 48
- Location: Bay Hill-Northeast of Center Hill

County Road 48 is two different former segments of Florida State Road 48. It runs from US 41 in Floral City, but doesn't enter Sumter County until it crosses the bridge over Withlacoochee River where it enters the unrecognized community of Bay Hill. The road passes an RV camp on the river and then the intersection with CR 575. From there it winds through the swampland and farmland of southwestern Sumter County, through Wahoo, briefly becoming a state road at Interstate 75's Exit 314 in Bushnell.

The second segment exists at the south end of the concurrency with US 301 at CR 476, where it becomes a county road again. It makes a right turn at a blinker light at Seminole Avenue and Florida Street. The route curves from south back to east again as it heads toward Beville's Corner which contains the intersection with SR 471, then enters Center Hill where it becomes Kings Highway, and then branches to the northeast towards Okahumpka and Howey-in-the Hills in Lake County.

== County Road 462 ==
County Road 462
- Location: Northern Sumter County

Sumter County Road 462 is a local rural west to east county road that spans from CR 475 northwest of Wildwood, and ends at CR 466A east of Wildwood. It was formerly designated as SR 462, and is briefly overlapped by US 301.

== County Road 466 ==
County Road 466
- Location: Northern Sumter County

Sumter County Road 466 is a west to east rural county road in northern Sumter County. It spans from a wye intersection with CR 475 east of an overpass over I-75, and ends at the Sumter-Lake County Line east of Oxford. The route was former designated as SR 466

=== County Road 466A ===
County Road 466A
- Location: Wildwood-Orange Home

Sumter County Road 466A is a west to east suffixed alternate route of CR 466 in northern Sumter County. It spans from US 301 across from the former Wildwood (Amtrak station) to the Sumter-Lake County Line. Like its parent route, it was formerly designated as SR 466A

== County Road 468 ==
County Road 468
- Location: Coleman-Orange Home

Sumter County Road 468 runs west-to-east from US 301 in Coleman to Florida State Road 44 in Orange Home at the northeast end. The road was formerly designated as SR 468 Though another CR 468 exists in nearby Lake County near Leesburg, little evidence of a connection between the two roads exists.

== County Road 469 ==
County Road 469
- Location: Mabel-Center Hill

Sumter County Road 469 runs south-and-north from SR 50 in Mabel just west of the Sumter-Lake County Line to CR 48 in Center Hill. The road was formerly designated as SR 469.

== County Road 470 ==
County Road 470
- Location: Rutland-West of Okahumpka

Sumter County Road 470 is a long bi-county road in central Sumter County running mainly west to east. The route runs from SR 44 in Rutland into the Sumter–Lake County Line west of Okahumpka at the north end of the multiplex with Lake CRs 33 and 48. The former designation was SR 470. Though another CR 470 exists in nearby Citrus County, little evidence of a connection between the two roads exists.

=== Route description ===
Sumter County Road 470 begins at an intersection with SR 44 in Rutland and runs south. Eventually, it starts curving towards the southeast as it runs through farm and ranch land. The ranch land diminishes as it enters a wooded area before encountering a trailer park community named Rivers Edge Estates, then the entrance to Marsh Bend Outlet Park, before crossing a bridge over Outlet River which runs between the Withlacoochee River and Lake Panasoffkee. Directly on the opposite side of this bridge is the Big Cypress Fish Camp. The road briefly runs straight east until it curves southeast again closer to the southwest side of the lake. Residencies and fishing camps become mixed with commercial development as the route enters "Downtown" Lake Panasoffkee. A sidewalk can be found on the southwest side of the street. The road turns more towards the east as it approaches Interstate 75 at Exit 321. The northbound off-ramp from that interstate is included in the nearby intersection with CR 475, and immediately encounters a grade crossing with the CSX-S Line. From there it passes by a local truck stop, and briefly curves south, before heading east again through Sumterville, running between more farm fields, although some local residencies and at least two industrial buildings can be found.

Approaching "downtown" Sumterville, the route turns north and overlaps US 301, where it also passes the post office, runs between the territory of the Sumter Electric Cooperative (SECO) buildings, serves as the terminus of SR 471, and then turns east across from the Shady Brook Golf & RV Resort, while US 301 heads north towards Coleman, Wildwood, Ocala, and across the Georgia state line towards northern Delaware. Shortly after the end of the overlap, the road crosses the right of way for a former Seaboard Air Line railroad line that carried the Amtrak Silver Meteor between Coleman and Auburndale until 1988, and was once proposed for the extension of the General James A. Van Fleet State Trail. Aside from a lime mine and a power substation, the surroundings are mostly rural. The route is also the location of the Federal Correctional Complex Of Coleman, although it is actually located southeast of Coleman. CR 470 continues to run through the rural farmlands of Central Sumter County, but suddenly encounters a right of way for a series of power lines that turns along the north side of the road. The power line right-of-way turns south and crosses the road just before CR 470 crosses the Sumter-Lake County Line.

As of July 2025, the Sumter County Board of County Commissioners approved a resolution renaming the portion of County Road 470 east of U.S. 301 to the Central Parkway roundabout as "Central Parkway" with new signage installed in July 2025.

== County Road 472 ==
County Road 472
- Location: Oxford-The Villages

Sumter County Road 472 runs west to east from US 301 south of Oxford to a local street named Rainey Trail on the edge of The Villages. The route was once designated as SR 472, which now exists exclusively within Volusia County.

== County Road 475 ==
County Road 475
- Location: Bushnell-South of Pedro

Sumter County Road 475 is one of two south-to-north routes in Sumter County. The first runs from US 301 and Former SR 48 in Bushnell to CR 470 at northbound Exit 321 on I-75 in Lake Panasoffkee. The second one runs north of SR 44 west of Wildwood through the Sumter-Marion County Line. Both segments were formerly designated as SR 475.

=== Route description ===
The first segment of County Road 475 begins on Main Street at the north end of the overlap between US 301 and CR 48 in Bushnell, and is overlapped by CR 48 itself until that route turns west at Belt Avenue towards Wahoo, and then to Floral City in Citrus County. CR 475 remains a four-lane undivided highway, and moves slightly away from the CSX S-Line, but still stays close to it, mostly hidden by a line of trees. Here the road passes by sites such as the South Sumter High School, and the Rural Metro Ambulance of Sumter County headquarters. The second northbound lane ends just north of the Osprey Point Nursing Center, and the second southbound lane begins just north of the intersection of Walker Avenue and Old Airport Drive. The Main Street name ends just north of that intersection. The first site just north of where the road becomes two lanes is the Paradise Oaks RV Resort. Later it crosses a bridge over Jumper Creek, as does the parallel railroad line. Just as some farm fields on the west side of the road become more open, County Road 475 curves to the northeast and becomes a two-lane divided highway as it receives a bi-directional connection from the northbound off-ramps from I-75 just south of the terminus at CR 470, which itself contains a group of connecting ramps not only to and from CR 470, but also to northbound I-75.

Far north from the wetlands of the lake, the route begins again at SR 44 west of the travel plazas of Wildwood, and is entirely a two-lane undivided rural highway. The landscape along this road is primarily horse farms and ranch land. Along the way, the route serves as the west end of CR 462. Later the road makes a sharp right curve to the east around Nichols Pond away from a former segment (now known as CR 245E) before crossing a bridge over I-75 and encounters a wye intersection with CR 466, where the road then turns to the northwest and runs parallel to I-75. The road turns straight north once again at its former alignment, and finally crosses the Sumter-Marion County Line, south of Pedro.

== County Road 476 ==
County Road 476
- Location: East of Nobleton-North of Bevilles Corner

Sumter County Road 476 is a long bi-county road in central Sumter County running mainly west to east. The route spans from US 19 in the Royal Highlands in Hernando County area to Nobleton, where it crosses the Hernando-Sumter County Line at a bridge over the Withlacoochee River through Bushnell into a rural area along SR 471 at the intersection with CR 567 north of Webster. The route overlaps US 301 and CR 48 in Bushnell, and was former SR 476.

=== Route description ===
County Road 476 enters Sumter County from the resort community known as Nobleton from a bridge over the Withlacoochee River across the Hernando–Sumter County Line, where the road was previously Hernando County Road 476. The road enters the county at a southeastern trajectory before encountering CR 635, which serves as the entrance to the Hog Island Recreational Area for the Withlacoochee State Forest. From there the road runs straight east and encounters the south end of Sumter County Road 575. Later it encounters a small Sumter County firehouse on the south side of the street. Right after curving to the northeast, the intersection with Sumter County Road 476B (Veterans Memorial Highway) runs just south towards an interchange with I-75.

The northeast trajectory takes a sharper turn to the north between CR 621 and Southwest 39th Drive. It has one diagonal intersection with CR 619, before encountering the northern terminus of that rural county road while it turns straight east again as it heads towards Bushnell. Signs pointing to I-75 via SR/CR 48 can be found near the intersection with CR 616. From there the road is flanked by local frontage roads on both sides before it crosses a bridge over I-75 with no access and at some point becomes West Seminole Avenue. Near the intersection with CR 603 (Battlefield Parkway), the signs can be found pointing south to the Dade Battlefield Historic State Park, although in the opposite direction are signs pointing to the Kenny Dixon Sports Complex, a local baseball and athletic park. North West Street is also an important local street that used to be part of SR 48.

CR 476 makes a sharp left turn at US 301 and SR 48, and West Seminole Avenue becomes East Seminole Avenue and CR 48/476A. North of here, US 301/SR 48/CR 476 is Main Street, a four-lane undivided boulevard towards the heart of Bushnell along the west side of the CSX S-Line. Across from West Noble Avenue, US 301/CR 476 makes a sharp right turn across the aforementioned railroad line, while Main Street continues north as SR 48/CR 475. Just after the intersection with North Florida Avenue, US 301 curves north towards Sumterville, Wildwood, Ocala, and the Georgia State Line while CR 476 continues to the east on East Noble Avenue. Lawrence Street serves as a connecting road between southbound US 301 and westbound CR 476. As the route leaves the city it encounters the northeast end of CR 476A at Jasper Street. From there, the road resumes its previous surroundings of farm and ranch land dotted with occasional small wooded areas. Sumter County Road 476 ends at Florida State Road 471 across from the west end of CR 576 at an area north of Bevilles Corner.

=== County Road 476A ===
County Road 476A
- Location: Bushnell

Sumter County Road 476A is a suffixed alternate of County Road 476 in Bushnell. It includes East Seminole Avenue and Jasper Street. Like its parent route, it was formerly designated as SR 476A, and has a partial overlap with Sumter County Road 48 along East Seminole Avenue. At a blinker light with Florida Street, CR 48 makes a sharp right turn while CR 476A shifts slightly to the left, but continues to run east until it encounters Jasper Street where it turns north and runs along the Bushnell City Line. The road ends at CR 476 east of where US 301 branches off to the north.

=== County Road 476B ===
County Road 476B
- Location: St. Cathrerine-West of Bushnell

Sumter County Road 476B is another suffixed alternate of CR 476 that runs from Interstate 75 and CR 673 at Exit 309 in Saint Catherine northwest to rural Sumter County west of Bushnell. It serves as a connecting route between I-75 and CR 476 Like its parent route, it was formerly designated as former SR 476B

== County Road 478 ==
County Road 478
- Location: East of St. Catherine-Center Hill

Sumter County Road 478 is a west-to-east route spanning from US 301 St. Cathrerine to CR 48 in Center Hill. The former designation was SR 478, and it also contains a brief overlap with SR 471 in Webster.

=== County Road 478A ===
County Road 478
- Location: West of Tarrytown-Webster

Sumter County Road 478A is a suffixed alternate of County Road 478 running from its south end at SR 50 west of Tarrytown to the east end at SR 471 in Webster. The former designation was SR 478A. It has no direct connection to CR 478, which is 0.4 mile north of the eastern terminus.

== County Road 567 ==
County Road 567
- Location: North of Beville's Corner-West of Center Hill

Sumter County Road 567 is a minor county road that serves as an extension of CR 476. It begins at the intersection of SR 471 at the eastern terminus of CR 476 north of Beville's Corner and runs west to east for the first segment of its existence until making a sharp curve to the south between a farmer's windmill and a private house. The road curves east again as it runs along the north side of the Lake Brantley Plant Corporation, and then curves south again for the second and last time, terminating at CR 48 west of the City of Center Hill.

== County Road 575 ==
County Road 575
- Location: East of Nobleton-Bay Hill

Sumter County Road 575 is a mostly south-to-north road running near the east bank of the Withlacoochee River. It spans from CR 476, east of Nobleton to CR 48 in Bay Hill. The former designation was SR 575, which currently only exists in Pasco County.

== County Road 673 ==
County Road 673
- Location: St. Catherine

Sumter County Road 673 spans west to east from I-75 & CR 476B at Exit 309 to US 301, all in Saint Catherine.

== County Road 788 ==
North Grade Road
- Location: Near Richloam

Sumter County Road 788 is a short west to east dead-end street leading from Florida State Road 471 to the Florida Bass Conservation Center and Richloam State Fish Hatchery, both of which are in the Richloam Tract of the Withlacoochee State Forest.
