= Florida State Road 48 =

Highway in Florida

State Road 48
- Former SR 48 highlighted in red

Route information
- Maintained by FDOT
- Existed: 1945 renumbering (definition)–2016

Major junctions
- West end: US 41 in Floral City
- East end: SR 19 in Howey-in-the-Hills

Location
- Country: United States
- State: Florida
- Counties: Citrus, Sumter, Lake

Highway system
- Florida State Highway System; Interstate; US; State; Former; Pre‑1945; Toll; Scenic
| ← SR 47 | → SR 49 |

State Road 48 (SR 48) was an east–west state highway that ran from U.S. Highway 41 in Floral City, Florida, to Florida State Road 19 in Howey-in-the-Hills, Florida. In the last years of the route's existence, it was a 2.167 miles (3.487 km) state road in Bushnell, Florida, which ran from Interstate 75 (I-75) at exit 314 to U.S. Highway 301 (US 301). Today, all segments are designated County Road 48 (CR 48), where they are under county maintenance. Segments in Sumter County are part of the Scenic Sumter Heritage Byway.

== Route description ==
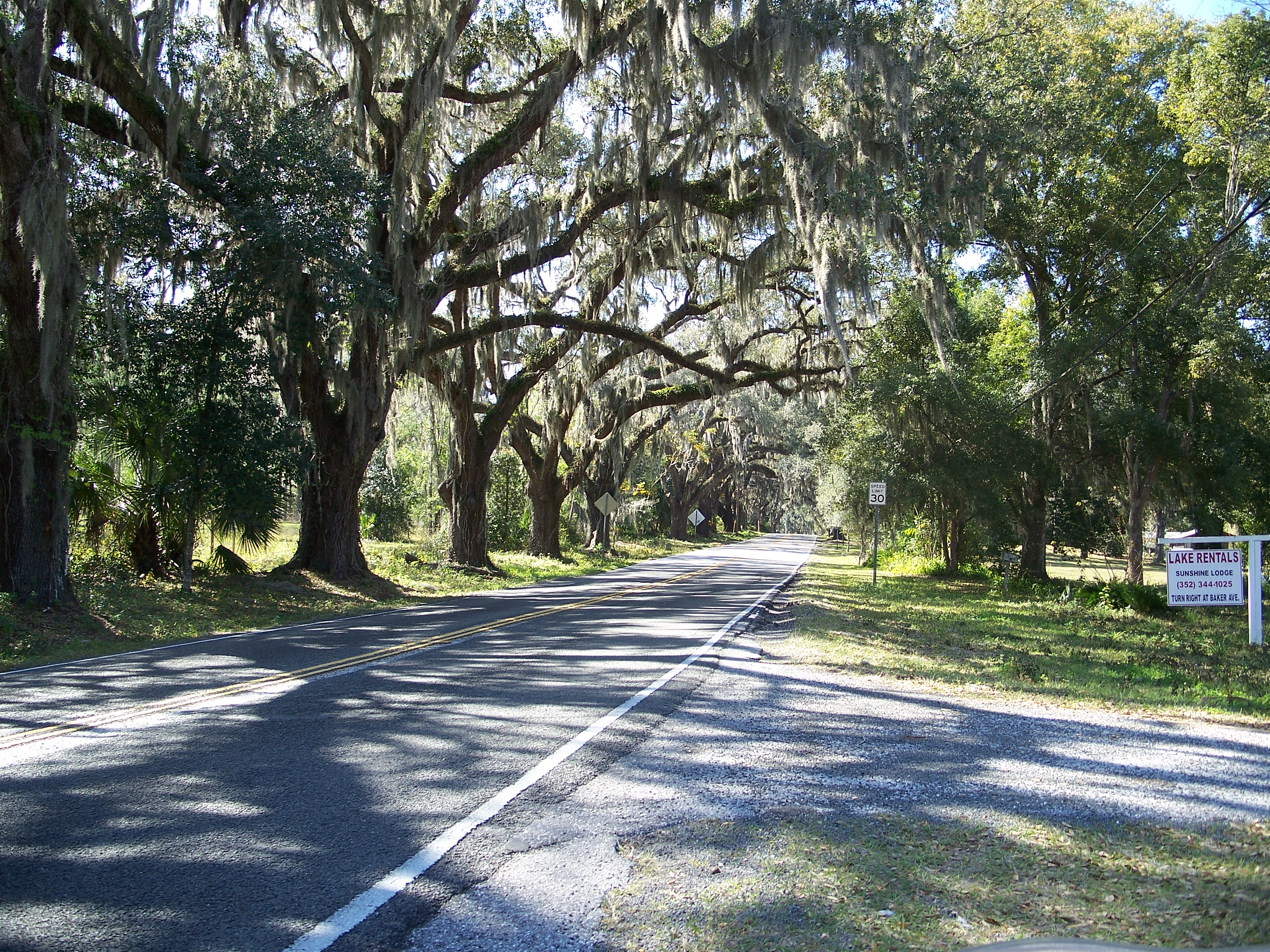
East Orange Avenue in Floral City was once part of SR 48.

SR 48 ran from US 41 in Floral City, in Citrus County. Within Floral City, it is called East Orange Avenue, while east of the city is known as East Bushnell Road. After crossing the Withlacoochee River, it wound through western Sumter County along part of the DeSoto Trail. Within Wahoo, the road passes by the "DeSoto Trailhead" near a memorial for the Battle of Wahoo Swamp and the Wahoo First Baptist Church.

East of CR 316A, the road becomes a four-lane undivided highway in Bushnell until it approaches Interstate 75, where it becomes a four-lane divided highway. The split section ends east of the vicinity of the Walmart Supercenter. The widened segment continues into downtown Bushnell until it intersects CR 475 and CR 548. From there, it turns south, overlapping CR 475 as a four-lane boulevard before intersecting with US 301.

The former SR 48 runs concurrently with southbound US 301 and westbound CR 476 along North Main Street, which becomes South Main Street at the intersection with West and East Central Avenues. The overlap ends at West Seminole Avenue, where CR 476 turns west towards Nobleton, Lake Lindsey and US 19 at the Chassahowitzka Wildlife Management Area while CR 48 turns east. West Seminole Avenue ends at the intersection with South Florida Street and East Southland Avenue. CR 48 turns south onto East Southland Avenue, which curves east before leaving Bushnell's city limits and heading through the rest of rural Sumter County. North of the city of Webster, it intersects with SR 471 as it heads towards Center Hill. Northeast of Center Hill, SR 48 crossed the Sumter–Lake county line and was named Leesburg Highway. In Okahumpka, the road runs concurrently with CR 33, then turned at 1st Street, taking the designation from CR 470 on its way to SR 19 in Howey-in-the-Hills.

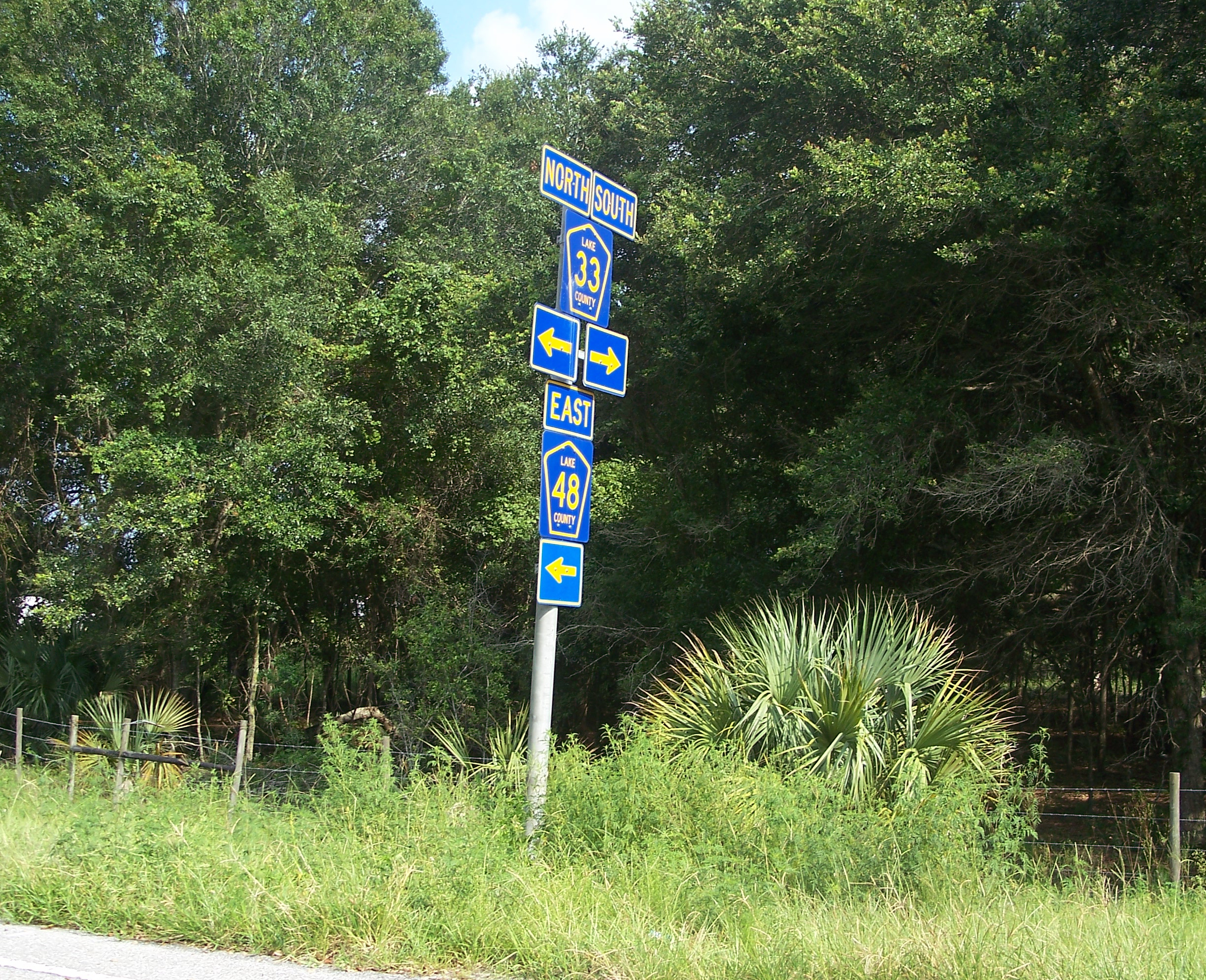
CR 48 joins CR 33 in Okahumpka.

== History ==
The route includes former segments of Florida State Roads 2, 22, 23, 210, 212, and 214, designated SR 48 as part of the 1945 great renumbering.

Sometime during the late 20th century, FDOT began turning maintenance of SR 48 over to Citrus, Sumter, and Polk Counties. By that time, the only segment that was state-maintained was from Interstate 75 and U.S. Route 301.

The route used to include North West Street and West Noble Avenue in Bushnell until sometime in the early-1990s. The east-to-south turning ramp from former SR 48 (Belt Avenue) to West Street which carried eastbound traffic smoothly between the intersecting streets was eliminated when the rest of the road was widened between Walmart and Sumter County Road 475 (Main Street). It also ran in an overlap with US 301 until the intersection with North Florida Avenue, then turned south in a wrong-way concurrency with CR 476, through the transition to South Florida Avenue at the intersection with East Central Avenue until the intersection with West Seminole Avenue. From there, the route ran along where the current Sumter and Lake County Roads 48 exist today.

In the early 21st century, FDOT widened SR 48 to four lanes between east of CR 316A and Interstate 75 and made other improvements in front of a Walmart Supercenter. The widening did not lead to a re-extension of the state designation, though. The rest of the route was widened to four lanes between the Walmart and Sumter CR 475 in the mid-2010's.

As part of the widening project of Interstate 75 through Pasco, Hernando, and Sumter Counties during the 2010s, FDOT agreed to remove the state designation for the remaining section of State Road 48 and exchange it for a future upgrade of CR 470 to a state road. The route was finally eliminated in November 2016.

== Major intersections ==
| County | Location | mi | km | Destinations | Notes |
|---|---|---|---|---|---|
| Citrus | Floral City | 0.000 | 0.000 | US 41 (South Florida Avenue / SR 45) – Tampa, Inverness | |
| Citrus | | 1.7 | 2.7 | CR 39 south (South Istachatta Road) | |
| Citrus | | 2.1 | 3.4 | To CR 39A / East Trails End Road | |
| Withlacoochee River | | 4.0 | 6.4 | Bridge | |
| Sumter | | 4.6 | 7.4 | CR 575 south | |
| Sumter | | 12.116 | 19.499 | west end of state maintenance until November 2016 | |
| Sumter | | 12.17 | 19.59 | I-75 (SR 93) – Ocala, Lake City, Tampa | I-75 exit 314 |
| Sumter | Bushnell | 14.030 | 22.579 | CR 475 north (Main Street) – Lake Panasoffkee | west end of SR 475 overlap |
| Sumter | Bushnell | 14.283 | 22.986 | US 301 north (East Noble Avenue / SR 35) – Coleman, Ocala | east end of SR 475 overlap; west end of US 301 / SR 35 overlap; east end of SR 48 (becomes CR 48) |
| Sumter | Bushnell | 14.816 | 23.844 | US 301 north (SR 35) / CR 476 west (Seminole Avenue) – Dade City, Nobleton, Dade Battlefield Historic State Park | east end of US 301 / SR 35 overlap (and of state maintenance); the west end of CR 476 overlap |
| Sumter | Bushnell | 15.1 | 24.3 | CR 476A north (East Seminole Avenue) | east end of CR 476 overlap |
| Sumter | Bevilles Corner | 18.7 | 30.1 | SR 471 – Sumterville, Webster, Sumter County Fair Grounds | |
| Sumter | Center Hill | 22.2 | 35.7 | CR 478 west (Virginia Avenue) | |
| Sumter | Center Hill | 22.5 | 36.2 | CR 469 south | |
| Lake | Leesburg | 31.2 | 50.2 | CR 33 south – Mascotte | west end of CR 33 overlap |
| Lake | Okahumpka | 31.7 | 51.0 | CR 33 north / CR 470 west to Florida's Turnpike – Leesburg, Sumterville | east end of CR 33 overlap |
| Lake | Leesburg | 32.8 | 52.8 | US 27 (SR 25) to Florida's Turnpike south | |
| Lake | Howey-in-the-Hills | 39.8 | 64.1 | SR 19 – Tavares | |
1.000 mi = 1.609 km; 1.000 km = 0.621 mi: Concurrency terminus; Route transition
