= List of Florida Scenic Highways =

Florida Scenic Highways
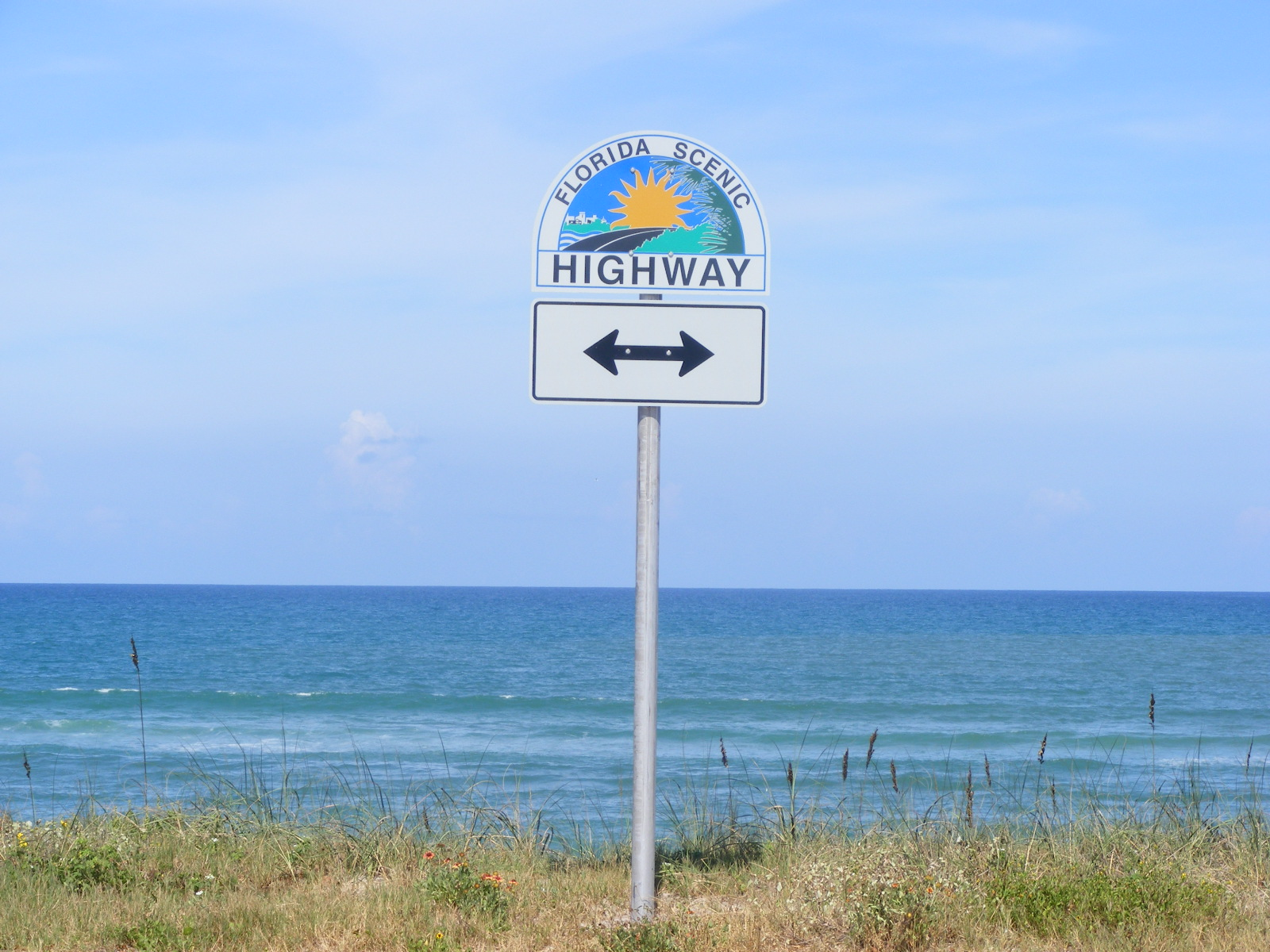
- A Florida Scenic Highway sign, along SR A1A in North Peninsula State Park.

Highway names
- Interstates: Interstate X (I-X)
- US Highways: U.S. Route X (US X)
- State: Route X (SR X)
- County routes: County Route X (CR X)

System links
- Florida State Highway System; Interstate; US; State; Former; Pre‑1945; Toll; Scenic

Florida Scenic Highways are a collection of scenic highways in Florida organized and managed by the Florida Department of Transportation, through the Florida Scenic Highways Program. Each highway passes through or connects sites that the state of Florida determines to be of cultural, historic, archaeological, recreational, natural and/or scenic significance found along Florida's highway system. The State uses the scenic highway designations to promote resource preservation and enhancement, promote tourism and economic development, and educate travelers. Florida has 27 state-designated scenic byways. Six of these byways are also National Scenic Byways, and two have been designated federally with the status of All-American Road.

== List of scenic highways ==
Florida Scenic Highway	Length (mi)	Length (km)	Southern or western terminus	Northern or eastern terminus	State designation date	Federal designation date	Highway corridors	Notes	Ref
A1A Ocean Islands Trail	40	64.4	Atlantic, Neptune, and Jacksonville Beaches	Amelia Island	July 26, 2016		SR A1A		
A1A Scenic and Historic Coastal Byway	72	115.9	Marineland	Ponte Vedra Beach	January 17, 2002	All-American Road (2021); National Scenic Byway (2002)	SR A1A	Follows Atlantic coast barrier islands	
Big Bend Scenic Byway	220	354.1	Apalachicola	Tallahassee	November 14, 2006	National Scenic Byway (2009)	US 98 / SR 300 / CR 59 / SR 65 / SR 267 / CR 375	220 miles that travel through Leon County, Wakulla County, and Franklin County	
Bradenton Beach Scenic Highway	3	4.8	Longboat Key Bridge	Bradenton Beach	April 17, 2001		SR 789		
Broward County A1A Scenic Highway	32	51.5	Miami-Dade County Line	Palm Beach County Line	July 20, 2009		SR A1A		
Courtney Campbell Scenic Highway	10	16.1	Clearwater	Tampa	May 23, 2005		SR 60		
Florida Black Bear Scenic Byway	123	198.0	Silver Springs / Altoona	Ormond / Rodman	April 9, 2008	National Scenic Byway (2009)	SR 40 / SR 19 / CR 445 / CR 445A / NF 47 / USFS Service Road 29	Runs through the Ocala National Forest	
Florida Keys Scenic Highway	110	177.0	Key West	Key Largo	June 22, 2001	All-American Road (2009)	US 1	Overseas Highway	
Green Mountain Scenic Byway	45	72.4	Oakland Park	Winter Garden	July 19, 2004		CR 455/CR Old 50/CR 438		
Halifax Heritage Byway	35	56.3	Holly Hill	Ponce Inlet	October 5, 2020		SR A1A (CR 4075) / CR 4011 / CR 4029 / CR 4035 / CR 4039 / CR 4040 / CR 4048 / CR 4050 / CR 4052 / CR 4062		
Heritage Crossroads: Miles of History Heritage Highway	98	157.7	Flagler Beach	Bunnell / Palm Coast	November 19, 2008		SR 11 / SR 100 / CR 201 / CR 2002 / CR 2001 / US 1 / CR 204 / CR 13 / CR 205		
Indian River Lagoon National Scenic Byway	233	375.0	Wabasso	Titusville	June 13, 2000	National Scenic Byway (2002)	SR A1A / SR 528 / US 1 / CR 402	Diverse estuary near the Kennedy Space Center	
Indian River Lagoon – Treasure Coast Scenic Highway	42	67.6	Jensen Beach	Vero Beach	December 14, 2005		SR A1A / CR 707	Diverse estuary and Native Floridian culture	
J. C. Penney Memorial Scenic Highway	3	4.8	SR 21	Paso Fino Road	April 30, 2010		SR 16	Includes loop in Penney Farms	
Lemon Bay/Myakka Trail Scenic Highway	47	75.6	Venice	Port Charlotte	April 9, 2008		SR 776 / CR 771 / CR 775A		
Martin Grade Scenic Highway	12	19.3	SR 710	Allapattah Flats	January 28, 2015		CR 714 / SW Martin Highway		
Old Florida Heritage Highway	48	77.3			June 7, 2001		US 441		
Ormond Scenic Loop and Trail	34	54.7	Ormond Beach	Ormond-By-The-Sea	July 9, 2007	National Scenic Byway (2009)	CR 2002 / CR 4011 / CR 2820 / SR 40 / CR 2803 / SR A1A		
Palma Sola Scenic Highway	4	6.4			May 28, 2004		SR 64		
Pensacola Scenic Bluffs Highway	11	17.7	Bayou Texar	US 90 Alt.	April 24, 1998		US 90		
Scenic Sumter Heritage Byway	62	99.8	Mabel	Rutland	May 2, 2013		SR 44 / CR 470 / US 301 / CR 476 / CR 476B / CR 673 / CR 478 / SR 471 / CR 48 / CR 747 / CR 478A / SR 50		
Tamiami Trail – Windows to the Gulf Coast Waters	70	112.7	Sarasota/Charlotte County Line	Hillsborough/ Manatee County Line	December 19, 2003		US 41		
The Ridge Scenic Highway	39	62.8	Haines City	US 27/US 98	February 16, 2005		SR 17		
River of Lakes Heritage Corridor	156	251.1	Sanford / DeLand	Pierson / Osteen	March 12, 2009	National Scenic Byway (2021)	US 17 / CR 3 / SR 11		
Scenic Highway 30A	33	53.1	Sandestin	Inlet Beach	April 9, 2008	National Scenic Byway (2021)	CR 30A		
Suncoast Scenic Parkway	42	67.6	The Cheval	Northern Hernando County	August 18, 2006		SR 589		
William Bartram Scenic and Historic Highway	17	27.4	Old Bull Bay Bridge	CR 210	October 31, 2005		SR 13		
