= Dade Battlefield Historic State Park =

- Dade Battlefield Historic Memorial
- U.S. National Register of Historic Places
- U.S. National Historic Landmark
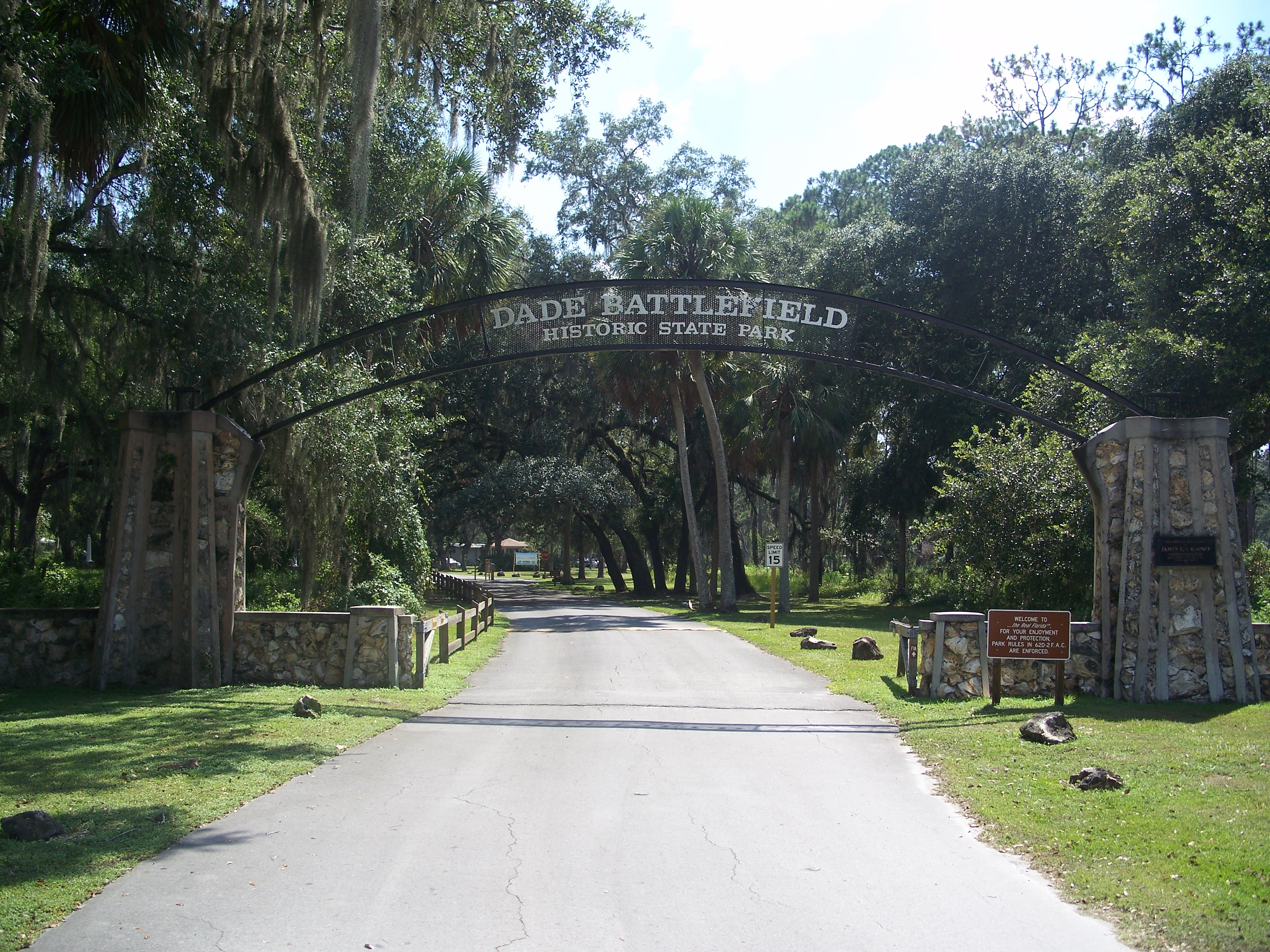
- Park entrance

- Location within Florida
- Interactive map of Dade Battlefield Historic Memorial
- Location: Sumter County, Florida, USA
- Nearest city: Bushnell, Florida
- Coordinates: 28°39′08″N 82°07′36″W
- Area: 80 acres (32 ha)
- NRHP reference No.: 72000353

Significant dates
- Added to NRHP: April 14, 1972
- Designated NHL: November 7, 1973

Dade Battlefield Historic State Park is a state park located on County Road 603 between Interstate 75 (Exit 314) and U.S. Route 301 in Sumter County, Florida. The 80-acre (32 ha) park includes 40 acres (160,000 m^{2}) of pine flatwoods and a live oak hammock. Also called the Dade Massacre site, it preserves the Second Seminole War battlefield where tribal Seminole warriors and Black Seminole allies fought soldiers under the command of Major Francis L. Dade on December 28, 1835. Each year, on the weekend after Christmas (as close to the original date as possible), the Dade Battlefield Society sponsors a reenactment of the battle that started the Second Seminole War.

Under the title of Dade Battlefield Historic Memorial, it is also a United States National Historic Landmark (designated as such on April 14, 1972).

== History ==
=== The Second Seminole War ===
The United States government negotiated the Treaty of Moultrie Creek in 1824, placing the Seminoles on a reservation that included the site of the future battle. A combination of white settlers moving onto public land in violation of the Treaty of Moultrie Creek, slave hunters trespassing onto the reservation to capture maroons without proof of ownership, and the government's implementation of the Indian Removal Act and the Treaty of Payne's Landing to move the Seminoles over the protests of Seminole chiefs infuriated the Seminoles.

At around 8:00 AM on the morning of December 28, 1835, around 130 Seminoles, led by Chief Micanopy, ambushed Major Dade and over 100 men along a segment of the Fort King Road as they marched to reinforce the troops stationed at Fort King (present-day Ocala, Florida). Dade, another commanding officer, and the entire left flank, consisting of one-half of the troops, were killed in the first volley. Over the next six hours, Dade's remaining troops and the Seminoles exchanged gunfire; the gunfire ceased as all but three of Dade's men and their guide Louis Pacheco were killed. Privates Joseph Sprague and Ransom Clarke returned to Fort Brooke (present-day Tampa, Florida); Sprague later served until the end of the Second Seminole War, and Clarke died from his injuries five years later. The Dade battle began the Second Seminole War.

In 1836, General Thomas Sidney Jesup ordered a regiment of Tennessee militiamen led by Major Robert Armstrong to build a supply depot at the site of the Dade battle named Fort Armstrong. From Fort Armstrong, Brigadier General Richard Keith Call led an attack on the Seminoles living in the Wahoo Swamp a few days after the fort's construction ended. Later in 1837, Major Thomas Childs took over command of the post. During his tenure, one "Colonel Dill", claiming that he was seeking escaped slaves, was detained and was ordered to return to his residence. General Jesup ordered that all government employees and express riders were barred from passing through Fort Armstrong for the purpose of looking for runaway slaves. This was to allow black Seminoles to enter the fort and to be eventually deported to reservations west of the Mississippi River. In 1984, after several years' work, the Sumter County Historical Society would place a marker at the site of Fort Armstrong.

=== Early 1900s ===
Attempts at preserving the Dade battle site began in 1897 with a bill introduced in the United States Congress which called for the creation of a national park on the Dade battleground and its inclusion in a national park system. Florida congressman Stephen Sparkman began efforts to preserve the Dade battle site on January 27, 1904, with the introduction of another bill in the United States House of Representatives seeking to create a national park on the battle's site. In 1907 and again in 1912, Sparkman re-introduced legislation that provided funding for a marker and for the preservation of the battleground. In 1919, United States representative Henry Jackson Drane of Florida, who had visited the Dade Battlefield area in 1884, introduced another bill for the creation of a memorial at the site.

=== 1920s ===
In 1910, two Florida newspapers, the Leesburg Commercial and the St. Lucie Tribune, encouraged legislators to place a marker on the site of the battle. At the state level, an attempt to create a memorial park on the site of the Dade battle was made in the early 1920s. Before his term in the Florida Legislature, Lake County judge J. C. B. Koonce held pre-trial hearings at the park's site. Fascinated by the battle, Lake County judge Koonce began to develop the area into a park in 1908. In 1921, as the Sumter County representative in the Florida House, Koonce, state senator W. M. Igou of Eustis, state representative L. D. Edge of Groveland, state representative T. G. Futch of Leesburg, and United States Senator Duncan Fletcher urged the Florida legislature to preserve the site.

In 1921, the state of Florida appointed Koonce, Fred C. Cubberly (the author of the book The Dade Massacre), and Mrs. A. M. Roland as commissioners of the Dade Memorial Park and authorized them to purchase 80 acres of land at and surrounding the site of the battle from three local families and a local company for $2,000 (USD). The Florida Legislature also appointed the board to maintain and operate the park.

After the passage of the bill, Sumter County residents cleared the land to form the park. During the 1920s, Koonce sculpted statues of the soldiers and Seminoles involved in the battle, ordered a bronze statue to portray Dade, built the gazebo, and constructed the monuments indicating where the officers fell. Koonce and his son O. B. Koonce maintained the landscape. He also pushed to have an archway placed at the entrance to the park, the construction of a road leading to the park in 1926, and electric power lines to connect the park to the power grid. Koonce also constructed other statutes, such as a pelican. In 1922, Representative Drane and Chief Clerk Nathan Hazen of the Ordnance Department arranged to have two guns shipped to the Dade Memorial Park. A portrait of Chief Micanopy hung in the lodge and a statute of Osceola close to the lodge honored the two leaders.

=== Centennial of the Dade Massacre ===
In 1935, Koonce promoted the idea to conduct a ceremony commemorating the 100th anniversary of the Dade Massacre. To mark the centennial of the Dade Massacre, organizers planned a reenactment of the battle. The Seminoles were to be invited to join and to formally sign a peace treaty with the United States government. Plans eventually changed to include a parade, a barbecue, concerts, addresses by dignitaries, and a full reenactment. On December 28, 1935, over 5,000 people, including Florida's governor attended the ceremony.

=== World War II ===
During World War II, Dade Memorial Park served as a United States Army installation. The United States Army Air Corps unit trained personnel in Morse code and radio communications from January 1944 to June 1944. On May 29, 1944, members of the 622nd Signal Aircraft Warning Company were transferred to a base in Ocoee, Florida.

The park also served as base housing for soldiers operating at the Bushnell Army Airfield. Tents and a supply room lined the area in front of the breastworks while a mess hall, an office, the motor pool, and a shower room flanked the living quarters. Other buildings were also built in other areas of the park.

=== 1950s ===
In 1949, the Florida Legislature dissolve the Dade Memorial Park Commission and moved the park under the care of the then Board of Parks and Historical Memorials. Several facilities were built at this time. In 1957, construction on the recreation lodge was completed. The museum opened on July 4, 1957. By 1959, the park had built a children's playground, two tennis courts, a baseball field, courts for shuffleboard and horseshoes, several picnic shelters, and a barbecue shed.

In an effort to restore the park to the conditions at the time of the battle, the Division of Natural Resources removed the archway, the monuments, and the statue of the pelican. At a public hearing about the park, the Division of Natural Resources officials faced strong opposition from long-time Sumter County residents who felt that the changes made to the park dishonored Koonce's vision for the park. Residents recovered the discarded monuments and placed them back in the park. When district naturalist John Dodrill realized that the statue portraying Dade was that of a Union soldier, agency officials attempted to raise money to replace the statue. Feeling that the state was dictating the park's design, county residents opposed the measure. In 1983, Dodrill designed a plaque explaining to visitors that the statue represented all fallen Sumter County soldiers.

=== 1960s ===
About 1968, Sumter County employees found several cylinders measuring 12 inches (30 centimeters) long and about three-fourths of an inch (1.9 centimeters) in diameter on the Dade Battlefield Historic Site grounds. Suspecting that the vials were munitions that had been buried on the park grounds during World War II, the workers turned the vials over to a state agency. According to former Sumter County civil defense director Vernon Berry, the agency stated that one vial exploded while the agency was analyzing it.

=== 1970s ===
On January 22, 1973, Ney Landrum, Chief of the Division of Recreation and Parks, nominated Dade Battlefield to be placed on the National Register of Historic Places. On November 7, 1973, the National Park Service issued national register number 72000353 to Dade Battlefield, listing the park on the National Register of Historic Places. In 1994, the National Park Service listed the park as a National Historic Landmark. To facilitate the study of the park, the National Park Service placed the park under the themes Political and Military Affairs, 1783–1860—Jacksonian Democracy, 1828–1844 and Westward Expansion of the British Colonies and the United States, 1763–1898—Military-Aboriginal American Contact and Conflict—East of the Mississippi, 1763–1850s.

In 1976, the state of Florida selected the Dade Battlefield State Historic Site to be a Florida Bicentennial Trail site. To emphasize the park's historical significance, the Division of Recreation and Parks attempted to remove the playground, the baseball field, the tennis courts, and the shuffleboard and horseshoe courts. The south end of the road dividing the park was cut off, making it safe for visitors, and culverts were placed in the ditch that was dug in the park at some time after the battle. In addition, park officials planned to obtain a cannon for the battlefield. As of 2004, one tennis court and two shuffleboard courts remained of the recreational facilities.

=== 1980s ===
Although members of the Florida Historical Society and several Sumter County veterans organizations sponsored a commemorative day held on December 28, 1966, the first reenactment of Dade's Massacre was held on December 28, 1980, for the battle's 145th anniversary. Dade City historian and Dade Massacre expert Frank Laumer, dressed as Private Ransom Clarke, retold the story of the battle to 300 attendees. Park rangers from Dade Battlefield and Fort Foster, dressed in period uniforms, staged a camp similar to Dade's.

The first two-hour-long reenactment since 1935 occurred on December 28, 1985. In 1987, the state constructed a 5-foot (1.5-meter) high and 150-foot (46-meter) long berm on the baseball field's outfield to enhance visitors' view of the reenactment. A Tampa television station aired segments about a commemorative hike led by Laumer from the Hillsborough River to the park from December 27, 1988, to the day of the reenactment on January 1, 1989. A record crowd of 4,500 people attending the reenactment on January 1, 1989, prompted the Dade Battlefield Society to consider the construction of an amphitheater. The Florida Department of Natural Resources granted approval for the amphitheater. For the December 28, 1989, reenactment, the Dade Battlefield Society expanded the event to a two-day event with full reenactments on both Saturday and Sunday.

Also on December 29, 1989, an officer's sword belonging to an artillery officer in Dade's command on loan from the Smithsonian Institution arrived at the park. Upon seeing a description of the sword in the magazine Smithsonian, Dr. Ray Giron, a former Santa Fe Community College and Central Florida Community College professor who collects swords, and Laumer contacted the organization. They learned that the sword had been in the Smithsonian's collection since 1880. Giron and Laumer requested that the sword be loaned to the Dade Battlefield museum. The sword was placed on display in a case containing a money belt and a sash that belonged to Lt. William Basinger, one of Dade's officers.

=== 1990s ===
In 1996, the Dade Battlefield State Historic Site hosted the first annual World War II Commemorative Day. Since the first event, the commemoration has grown to include reenactors representing both the Allies and the Axis, vendors, music, encampments, vehicles, and food.

=== 2000s ===
Over 70 children and 100 adults from the Seminole Hollywood Youth Conference visited the Dade Battlefield State Historic Site as part of the "Looking Back at the Seminole Trail" tour on July 8, 2003. Organized by Holly Tiger and Jo Motlow North the trip was a way for Seminole adults and children to visit Seminole battlegrounds as most of them had never visited the sites as children. Although Seminoles had portrayed their ancestors during the annual reenactments, the "Looking Back at the Seminole Trail" tour was the first time that members of the Seminole Tribe formally visited the park. During the visit, elders Billy Cypress and Bobby Henry and park ranger Chuck Wicks explained both sides of the conflict to the group. The conference members then walked along the trails and visited the museum.

In January 2011, the Florida Department of Environmental Protection (DEP) listed the Dade Battlefield State Historic Site as one of 53 parks that would be closed to the public to reduce the agency's budget by 15% as mandated by the Florida legislature. DEP stated that parks such as the Dade Battlefield State Historic Site were selected for their visitation numbers and their lack of camping facilities. Residents and state Senator Paula Dockery were outraged. To generate interest in the park, members of the Dade Battlefield Society organized events such as a bluegrass festival and an arts and crafts show. In addition, residents organized Friends of Dade Battlefield, a group formed to generate interest in the park. In February 2011, Florida Governor Rick Scott met with DEP officials and expressed his disapproval of the DEP's plan, stating, "As you know, we've gotten two gold medals for our parks. I think we have 20 million-plus visitors. So, no, we've got great parks, and we've got to make sure we preserve them and take care of them."

In April 2013, the park hosted the first annual Swallow-tailed Kite and Wildlife Festival. Swallow-tailed kites had visited the park, and the Dade Battlefield Society decided to create a festival to educate the public about the birds. The festival's activities included a lecture on swallow-tail kites, kite building and flying, birdhouse construction, and watching the swallow-tailed kites.

== Facilities and recreational activities ==
Monuments indicating the locations of the officers' deaths stretch from the park's entrance to about 300 feet (91 meters) south. The museum which details the Seminole War lies 49 feet (15 meters) from the replica of the breastworks and about 600 feet (180 meters) from the northernmost commemorative monuments. The reenactment takes place in a cleared area in the pine woods about 200 yards (meters) from the site of the actual battle.

Activities include picnicking, viewing exhibits at the visitor center, and wildlife viewing. A 3,499-foot (1,066-meter) long nature trail winds through the pine flatwoods. In addition, there is a gazebo, a lodge that seats 96 people and has a kitchen, outdoors areas that can be rented for weddings and outdoor events, a tennis court, two shuffleboard courts, six picnic shelters, a barbecue shelter, and restrooms. Several geocaches are hidden in the park. The park is open between 8 a.m. and sundown every day of the year (including holidays) while the visitor center is open between 9 a.m. and 5 p.m.

== Climate ==
The average low for the month of January is 45.5 °F (7.5 °C) while the average high is 70.9 °F (21.6 °C). In July, the average high is 91.5 °F (33.1 °C) while lows average 70.5 °F (21.4 °C). The average precipitation from April 1, 1918, to April 30, 2012, was 50.04 inches (127.1 centimeters). No snow fell during that period.

== Natural history ==
=== Geology ===
Considered to lie in the Central Highlands, the park is generally flat, with an average elevation of 69 feet (21 meters) above sea level. The lowest point is a dug-out 0.6-acre pit that has been historically used as a vegetation burn pit. The primary rock under the park is limestone. The Florida Crushed Stone Company once considered mining limestone near the park, but they deemed the quality of the limestone to be a commercially poor product.

The soil under Dade Battlefield consists of two types of sand: Kanapaha sand and Sparr fine sand. Kanapaha sand is a gray soil that is poorly drained and slowly permeable. It was formed in marine sediments that contained sand and loam. Kanapaha sand supports forest areas. Sparr fine sand is a dark gray sand that occurs in sandy and loamy areas that had been at marine areas. It is poorly drained and slowly permeable. Sparr fine sand supports pine, oak, magnolia, dogwood, and hickory trees. These sands formed from the Middle Eocene to the Holocene period.

The city of Bushnell supplies the park's drinking water. The park also has a ditch that connects two ponds, Center Pond, located south of Bushnell, and Webb's Pond (called the "Death Pond" in records related to the battle), a pond located on private property adjacent to the park. Four bridges throughout the park cross the ditch. Although it normally drains into the swampy areas near the park, water has flowed in the ditch three times before, in 1994, 1995, and 1998, all when heavy rains fell in the area.

=== Ecology ===
The area of the battlegrounds was originally pine barrens, a habitat dominated by pines and palmettos. (It is currently known as longleaf pine mesic flatwoods.) Land use made several changes to the land. In 1828, soldiers and slaves constructed the Fort King Road by cutting the understory and pine trees, leaving a 20-foot (6.1-meter) wide road. At the turn of the century, the remaining pine strands were used to produce turpentine and for logging. By 1927, oaks dominated the community. During World War II, pine stumps were removed from the park. In the 1970s, the Florida DEP prescribed controlled burns to prevent the park's pine flatwoods from succeeding into an oak hammock. In the 1950s, officials from the Department of Natural Resources proposed to let the grass and scrub habitat return to its natural state, but residents opposed the measure. In 1976, as a part of the state's Bicentennial Trail preparations, removed several nonnative Florida plants and planted longleaf pines in the park. In 2012, the Sumter County Master GardenerCommunity Beautification Committee designed and replanted several of the park's landscapes in the public areas with native and endemic plants.

Forty five acres of the original longleaf pine (Pinus palustris) habitat remain today. Five acres of slash pine (Pinus elliottii) has been planted in the flatwoods. The rare Florida anise or yellow star anise (Illicium parviflorum) has been reported in the park. Among the wildlife of the park are woodpeckers, songbirds, and hawks, and indigo snakes. Several gopher tortoises (Gopherus polyphemus) live in the park, and Eastern indigo snakes (Drymarchon corais couperi) have been sighted in the park. Live oaks (Quercus virginiana) cover the rest of the park.

== Dade Battlefield Society ==
The Dade Battlefield Society is a non-profit organization created to preserve the Dade Battlefield State Historic Site. It was created on June 8, 1987. Since the creation of the organization, the Dade Battlefield Society has sponsored the annual reenactment of Dade's battle. It also has made information about the battle available to the public and has created two videos, a thirty-minute video which details the battle's events and a short film that is shown in the Dade Battlefield Visitors Center. In addition, the Society rebuilt the cement log breastwork and corrected the breastwork's orientation as the breastwork faced west and not east. In 2002, the society purchased a six-pound long barrel cannon similar to the one Dade's men used in the battle.

The annual reenactment begins at 2:00 PM on both Saturday and Sunday. An actor portraying Private Ransom Clarke narrates just before the battle starts. The battle begins as the Seminoles, portrayed by Seminoles from the Big Cypress Seminole Reservation, and Dade's men exchange gunfire. After "Taps", the reenactors rise and talk to the public. During the day, there are demonstrations, lectures, folk music, musket shooting contests, tomahawk throwing contests, and a trade fair.

== Nearby ==
The city of Bushnell lies to the north and the east of the Dade Battlefield Historic State Park. The town of Wahoo lies six miles (9.7 kilometers) to the west of town. The Wahoo area served as a sheltered area for the Seminoles during the Second Seminole War. The United States Army and the Seminoles fought the Battle of the Withlacoochee River near the town on December 29, 1835. In addition, the army searched the area several times during the Second Seminole War. Today, the town is a populated area within Sumter County, and the battle site is protected by the state of Florida as a part of the Florida Forever Priority List.

== Reference books ==
- Alderson, Doug (2013). The Great Seminole Trail. Sarasota, Florida: Pineapple Press. pp. 53, 55–57, 61. ISBN 978-1-56164-003-4.
- Covington, James W. (1993). The Seminoles of Florida. Gainesville, Florida: University Press of Florida. pp. 51–53, 59–60, 73–74, 80, 81–82, 84, 98–99. ISBN 978-0-8130-1196-7.
- Hatch, Thom as (2012). Osceola and the Great Seminole War. New York: St. Martin Press. p. 59. ISBN 978-0-312-35591-3.
- Laumer, Frank (1995). Dade's Last Command. Gainesville: University Press of Florida. pp. 19, 79, 117, 175, 217, 218. ISBN 978-0-8130-1324-4.
- Meltzer, Milton (2004). Hunted Like a Wolf: The Story of the Seminole War. Sarasota, FL: Pineapple Press. p. 65. ISBN 978-1-56164-305-9.

== Gallery ==
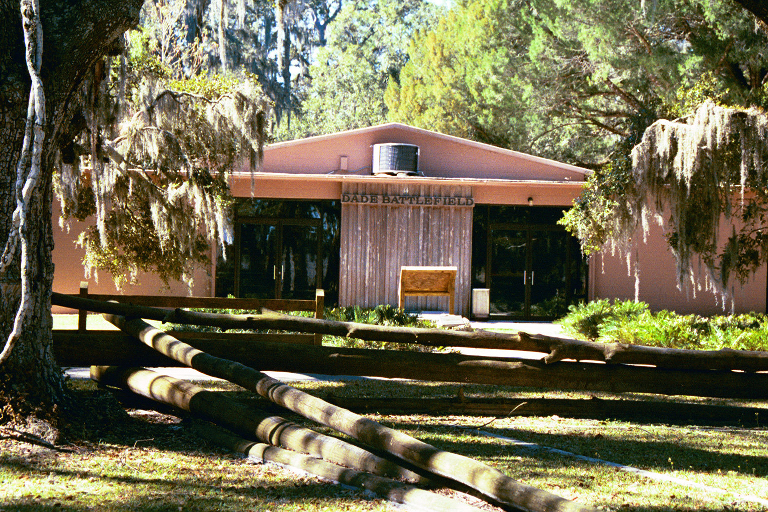
Picture of visitor center from behind redoubt. According to plaques there, the redoubt is on the site where Major Dade's soldiers made their last stand.

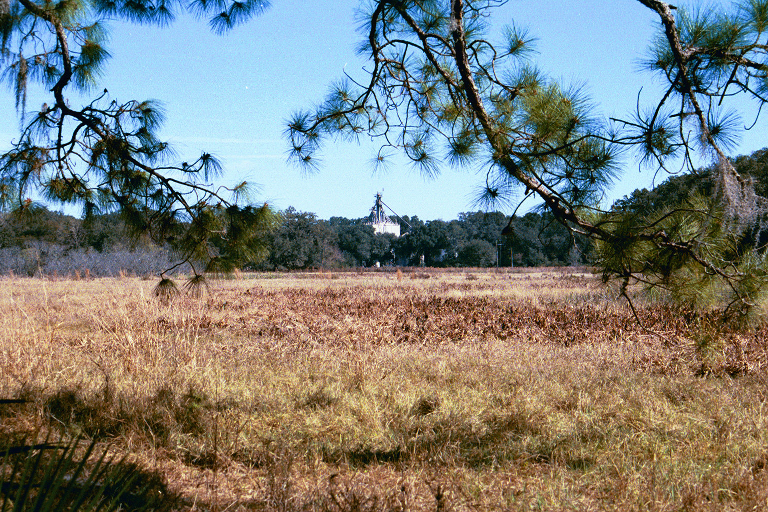

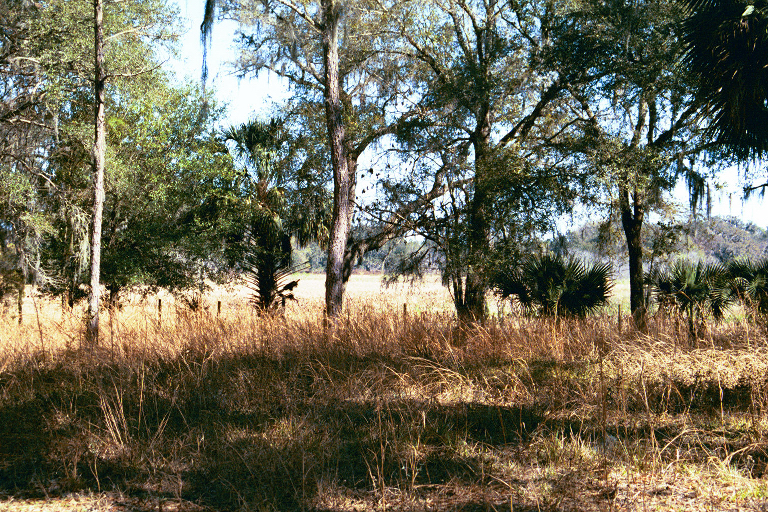

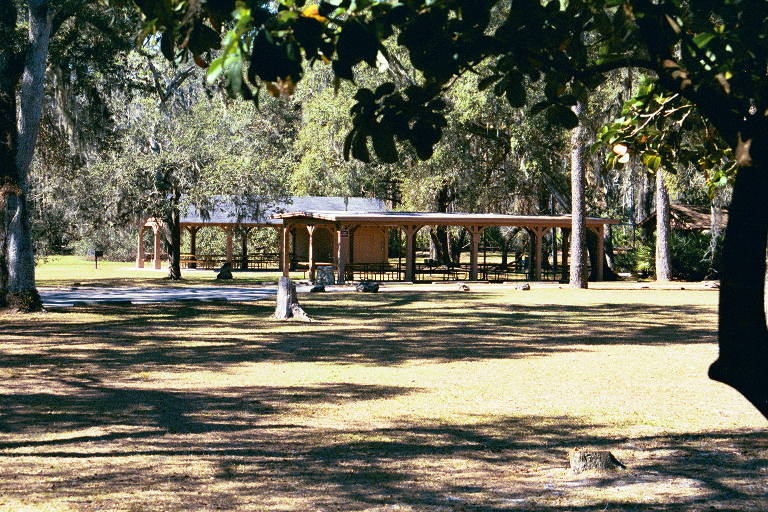

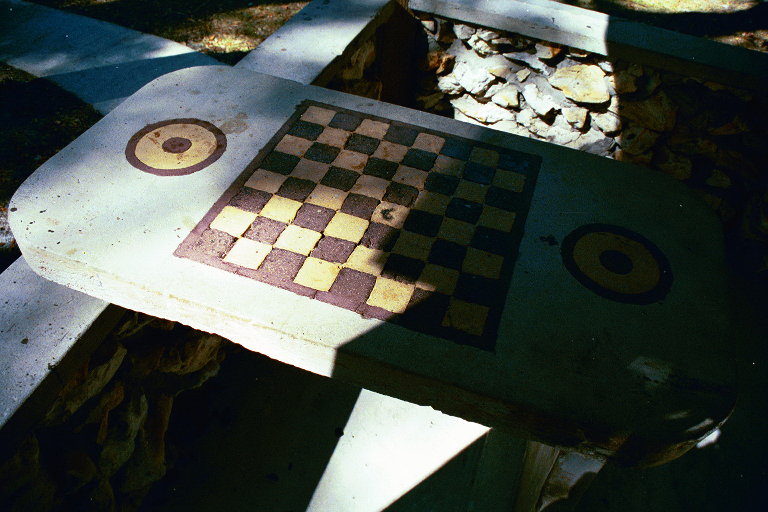

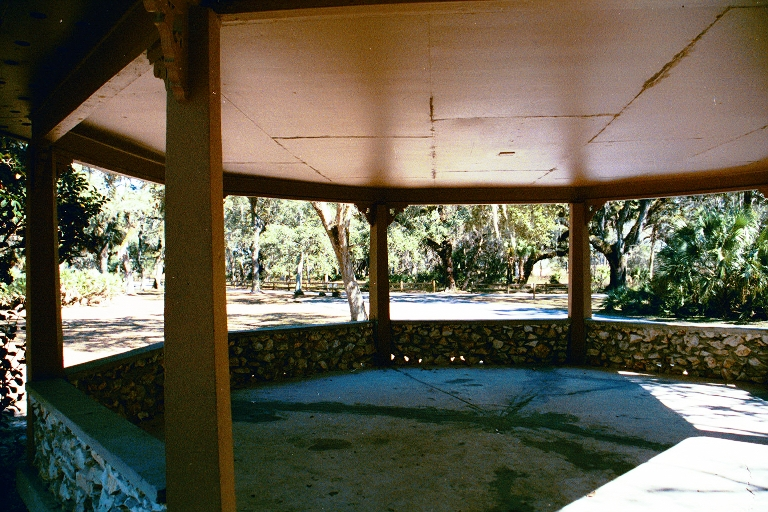

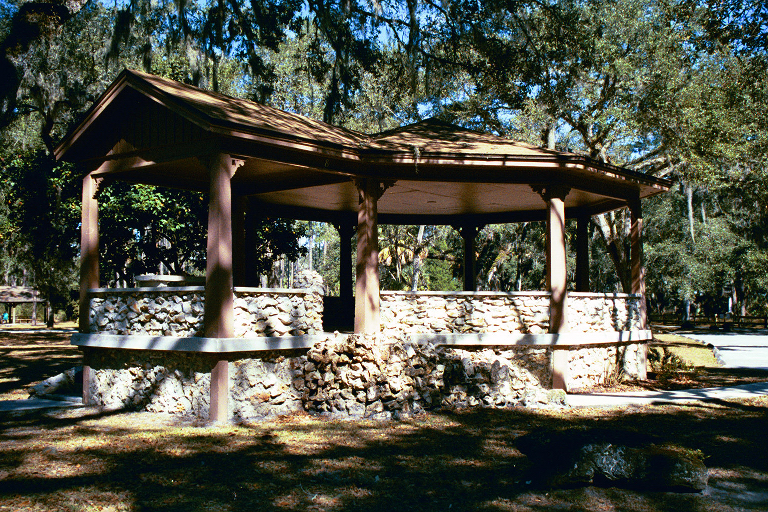

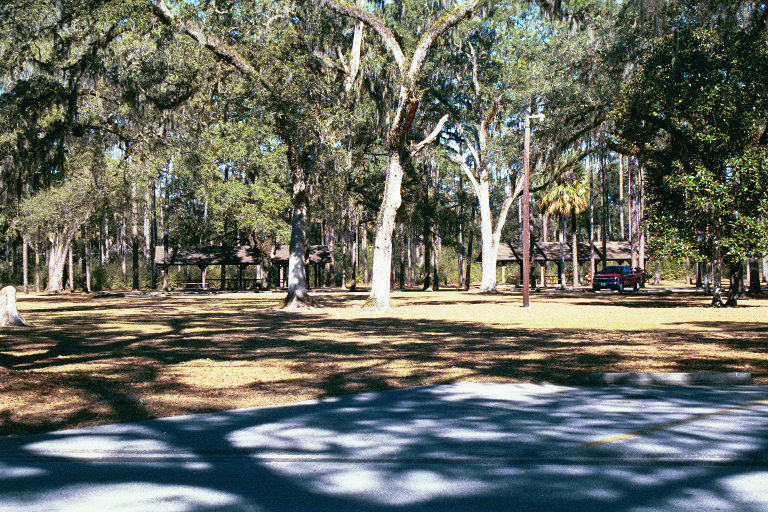

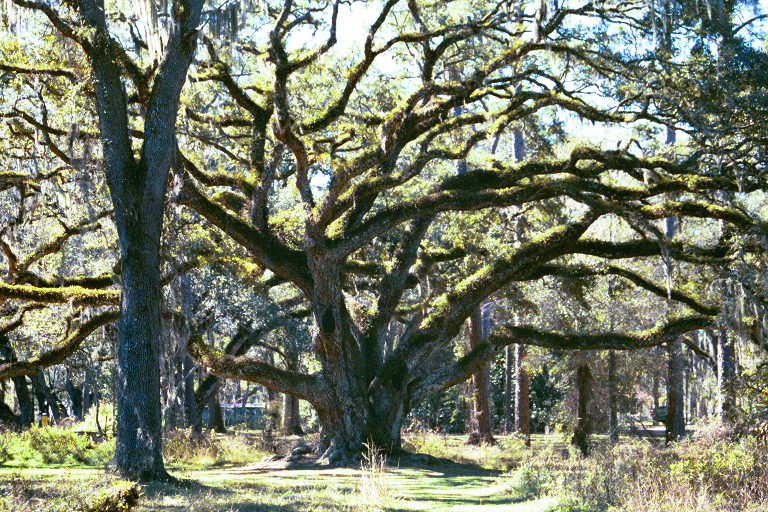
