= Oxford, Florida =

- Unincorporated community
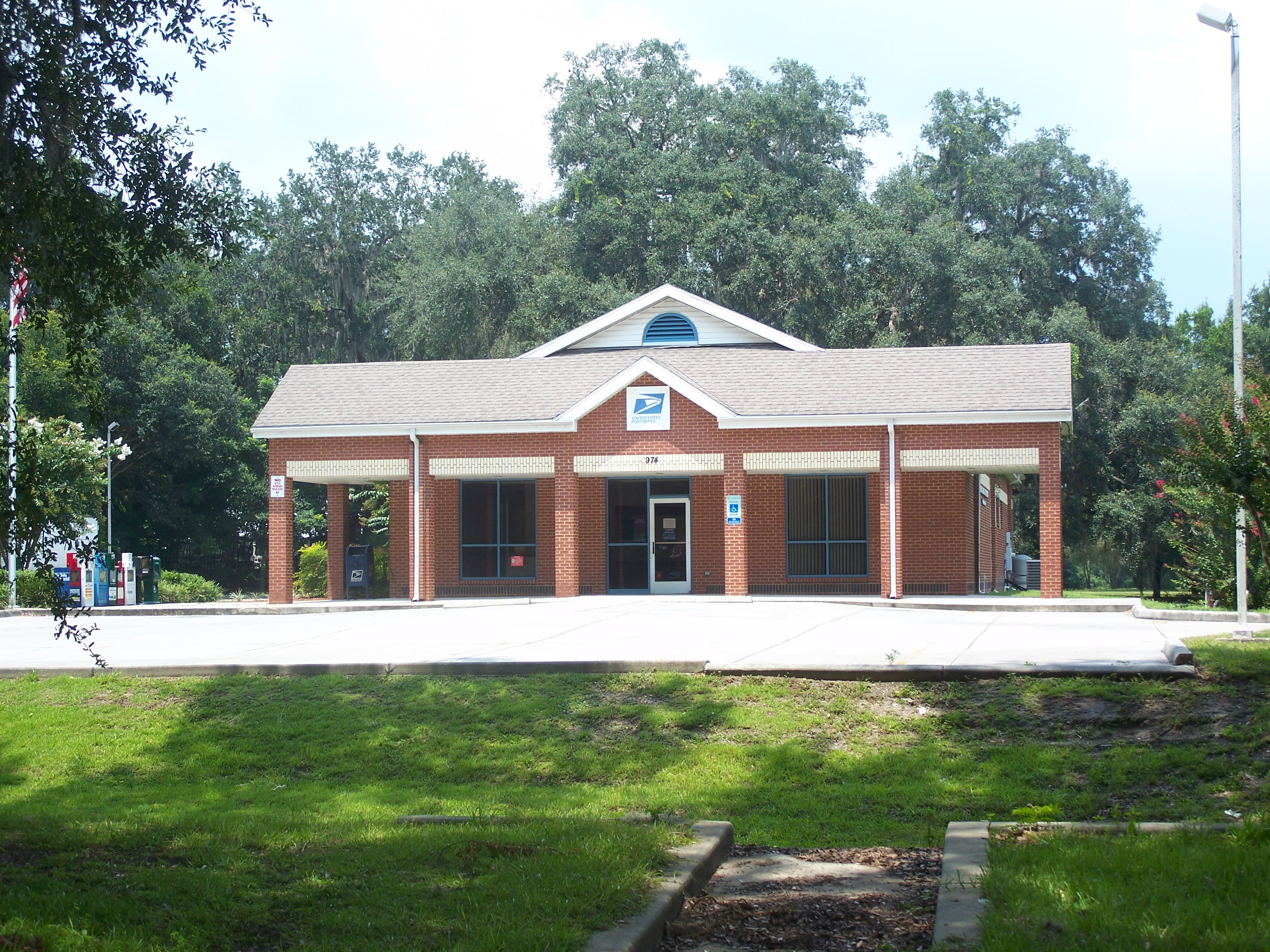
- Post office

- Location within Florida
- Coordinates: 28°55′39″N 82°02′14″W
- Country: United States
- State: Florida
- County: Sumter
- Elevation: 105 ft (32 m)
- Time zone: UTC-5 (Eastern (EST))
  - Summer (DST): UTC-4 (EDT)
- ZIP code: 34484
- Area code: 352
- GNIS feature ID: 288328

Oxford is an unincorporated community in Sumter County, Florida, United States. Its ZIP code is 34484.

== Geography ==
Oxford is bordered by Wildwood to the south, rural Sumter County to the west, the Marion County line to the north, and The Villages to the east. It is located along U.S. 301 and the CSX Wildwood Subdivision, which is part of the CSX S-Line. The main intersections are with County Road 466 and a lesser intersection with County Road 472 exists south of there.
