= Center Hill, Florida =

City of Center Hill
- City
- Center Hill, Florida
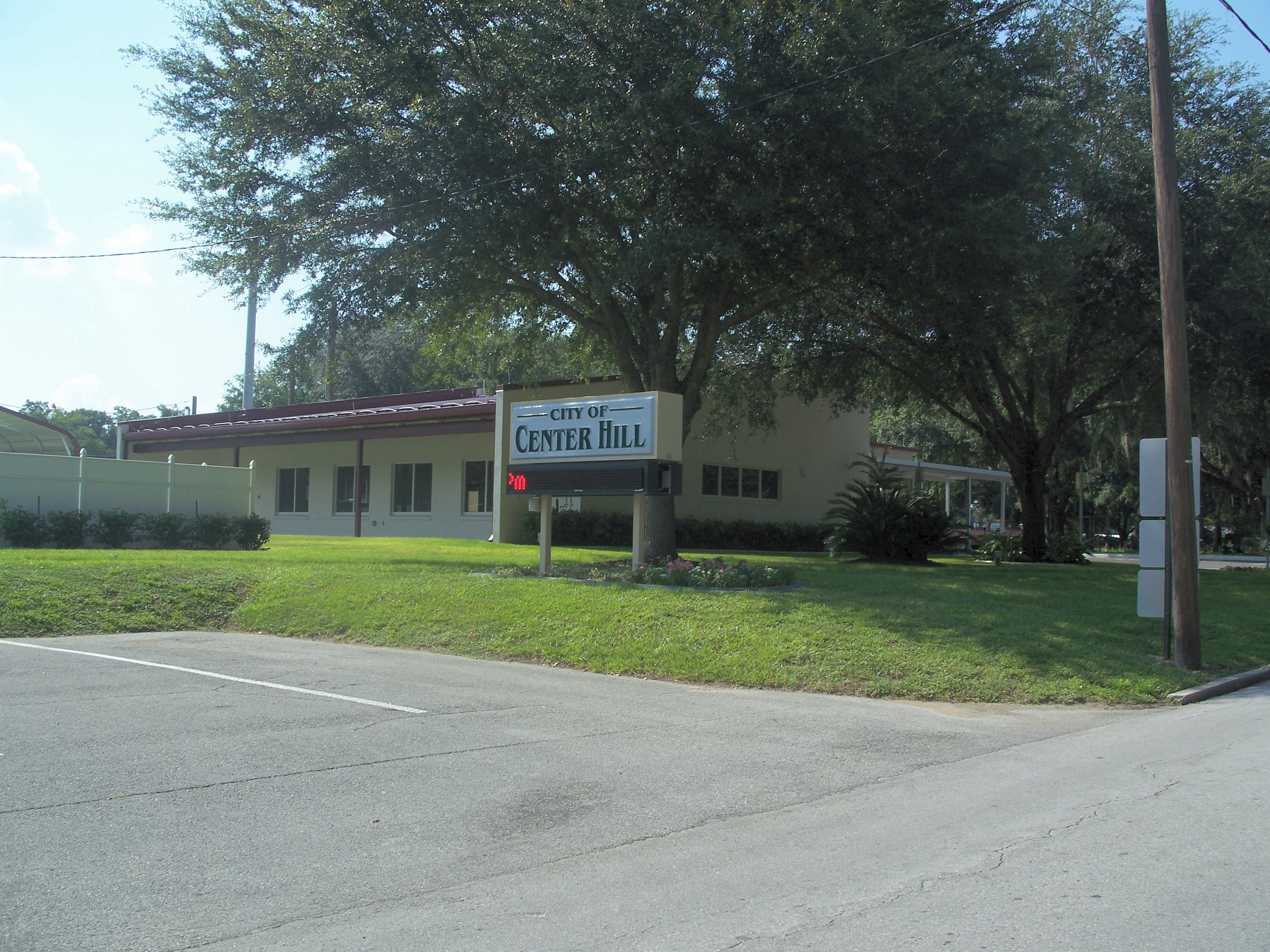
- Center Hill City Hall & Police Station

- Location in Sumter County and the U.S. state of Florida
- Coordinates: 28°37′46″N 82°00′03″W
- Country: United States
- State: Florida
- County: Sumter
- Settled (Abraham's Old Town): 1800
- Settled (Peliklakaha): 1813
- Founded (Center Hill): c. Late 1830s-Early 1840s
- Incorporated (City of Center Hill): 1925

Government
  - Type: Mayor-Council
  - Mayor: Ginger Howard
  - Chairman: Billy Bowles
  - Councilors: Tonota Parker, Dan Shimasaki, Jack Nash, and Vice-Chairman; Donnie Buckner
  - City Clerk: Diane Lamb
  - City Attorney: Josh Billa

Area
  - Total: 6.45 sq mi (16.70 km^{2})
  - Land: 6.10 sq mi (15.80 km^{2})
  - Water: 0.35 sq mi (0.90 km^{2})
- Elevation: 89 ft (27 m)

Population (2020)
  - Total: 846
  - Density: 138.7/sq mi (53.55/km^{2})
- Time zone: UTC-5 (Eastern (EST))
  - Summer (DST): UTC-4 (EDT)
- ZIP code: 33514
- Area code: 352
- FIPS code: 12-11325
- GNIS feature ID: 2404019
- Website: cityofcenterhill.org

Center Hill is a city in Sumter County, Florida, United States. The population was 846 at the 2020 census.

== History ==
=== Early inhabitants ===
By 1800, Black Seminoles and "maroons", or fugitive slaves, had settled in the present-day City of Center Hill, which was initially called "Abraham's Old Town", near the Wahoo Swamp. The Abraham in question was a formerly enslaved man known as Negro Abram. Maroons who fought for England joined the Black Seminoles after the runaway slaves fled to Florida, a free territory under Spanish rule, to avoid remaining in slavery following the American Revolution. Both Black Seminoles and maroons lived with the Seminoles in a feudal-like relationship; the Black Seminoles paid the Seminoles with a percentage of their crops in exchange for their freedom. The Black Seminoles settled in the Center Hill area in 1813 and named it "Peliklakaha". Accompanying them was Seminole chief Micanopy, who made Peliklakaha his residence after the death of Payne.

The town had about 100 residents. They came as runaway slaves from Georgia. Others were of African descent, specifically from the Kongo region, and some Seminoles, including one of Micanopy's wives, lived in Peliklakaha. The town's layout was influenced by slave quarters, Seminole villages, and African villages. The residents lived in buildings constructed from daub, thatch, and lumber. Peliklakaha participated in regional trade with the Seminoles, black hunters travelling to South Florida, and white travelers as the village was located at the center of several well-travelled Native American trails.

The United States and Florida governments noticed the area's fertility. In 1823, while informing the Seminoles about the meeting at Moultrie Creek, Horatio S. Dexter, an envoy sent by Florida territorial governor William P. Duval, discovered that the Black Seminoles grew rice, peanuts, and corn. In 1826, United States Army General George McCall visited Peliklakaha and noticed that their farms were located on what General McCall called "the finest land".

=== Second Seminole War ===
Whites called the town "Abraham's Old Town", after Abraham, a former slave who had been given his freedom by the British and who served as a recruiter and an interpreter for the Seminoles. After hearing that Francis L. Dade and his men were to cross through the territory, Abraham anticipated an attack on Peliklakaha and convinced Micanopy to move Seminole soldiers to the Fort King Road. Abraham left the village after the Dade battle on December 28, 1835. A short time later in 1836, General Winfield Scott moved General Abraham Eustis' troops to the Peliklakaha area to destroy the Seminoles. General Eustis and his troops burned Peliklakaha; no Seminoles were killed as Peliklakaha's population fled to the Wahoo Swamp before Eustis' forces arrived. General Eustis would later commission a painting depicting the burning of Peliklakaha, which later was hung in the Library of Congress.

On April 19, 1842, Colonel William J. Worth attacked Halleck Tustenuggee at Peliklakaha. During the battle, Halleck Tustenuggee and his warriors constructed a log barricade. United States Army soldiers attacked the front of the barricade while dragoons attacked from the back. Halleck Tustenuggee and his warriors retreated, and the United States Army burned the camp. The battle left one soldier dead and four wounded on the United States side and one soldier killed and one captured on the Seminole side. A few days later, Halleck Tustenuggee, two of his wives, and two of his children voluntarily surrendered to Worth at Warm Springs. On August 14, 1842, Worth declared the Second Seminole War over.

=== Settlement of Center Hill ===
In the late 1830s and early 1840s, the Mobley and Beville families settled in the area. Either the town's postmaster Thomas W. Spicer or Carrie Lovell named the town "Center Hill". Spicer thought that the town was the hub of activity. Lovell named the town after its location of being on a hill in the center of the county. In 1925, the City of Center Hill was officially incorporated as a municipality.

=== Agricultural heyday ===
According to Broward Mill, the past president of the Sumter County Historical Society, Center Hill was known for its string bean production in the early part of the 20th century. In 1931, Center Hill shipped green beans, green peas, and lima beans to Baltimore, Boston, New York City, Chicago, and Detroit. Beginning in the mid-1930s, Center Hill's soil fertility declined. Local bean farmers blamed a decrease in the water table. They believed that the creation of the Jumper Creek Drainage District, which the local circuit court formed in 1922 to reclaim about 24,600 acres by draining water from Jumper Creek into Jumper Lake and the Withlacoochee River, deprived them of water and forced them to irrigate large fields. By 1975, bean production was virtually nonexistent, and the population decreased from a peak of 1,500 people to 37 in 1970. In 1988, area farmers still sent their bell peppers, cucumbers, squash, tomatoes, and watermelons to Center Hill for packing and shipping.

=== 1990s ===
In the 1990s, Center Hill gained a reputation of being a speed trap. The town received a Clinton administration community policing grant of $167,000 (USD) in order to hire ten full and part-time police officers. From the receipt of the grant to 1997, residents complained about the officers issuing traffic tickets, especially for speeding. In November 1997, four police officers, including Police Chief Kendall Alsobrook, left the police force, and the department's staff was reduced to one full-time officer.

=== Peliklakaha's rediscovery ===
In 1998, archaeologists from the University of Florida in Gainesville, Florida began the first excavation of a Black Seminole village in a pasture about two miles from Center Hill. The researchers hoped to determine the town's social structure and the former residents' lifestyle. The investigators found dozens of artifacts, including iron pieces, stoneware, glass beads, nails, and pottery. Historians believe that over 100 Black Seminoles lived in Peliklakaha, the largest known Black Seminole village. Historians also believe that Peliklakaha was rebuilt after Abraham was among the first Seminoles and Black Seminoles to be transferred to a reservation in the west.

=== 2000s ===
On July 31, 2001, a 500-pound (227-kilogram) Siberian tiger named "Tie" fatally attacked Vincent Lowe, a worker at the Savage Kingdom exotic animal park who was attempting to earn state certification to work with the cats, while Lowe was repairing the cage. The tiger burst through his cage and pounced on Lowe before Lowe could fire his pistol at the tiger. Park owner Robert Baudy shot the cat. The incident was the second one in park history. The first was in March 1997, when another Siberian tiger escaped from its cage and mauled a worker before being killed by members of the Sumter County Sheriff's Department. In February 1999, state game officials discovered substandard cage wiring; the ranch corrected the issue by May 1999, the last inspection before the incident. On July 6, 2006, the United States Department of Agriculture ordered that Savage Kingdom's license be revoked permanently.

== Geography ==
According to the United States Census Bureau, the city has a total area of 1.8 square miles (4.7 km^{2}), of which 1.7 square miles (4.4 km^{2}) is land and 0.1 square miles (0.26 km^{2}) (3.39%) is water.

=== Climate ===
The climate in this area is characterized by hot, humid summers and generally mild winters. According to the Köppen climate classification, the City of Center Hill has a humid subtropical climate zone (Cfa).

== Demographics ==
Historical population
Census	Pop.	Note	%±
1910	299		—
1920	574		92.0%
1930	726		26.5%
1940	545		−24.9%
1950	522		−4.2%
1960	529		1.3%
1970	371		−29.9%
1980	751		102.4%
1990	735		−2.1%
2000	910		23.8%
2010	988		8.6%
2020	846		−14.4%
U.S. Decennial Census

=== 2010 and 2020 census ===
Center Hill racial composition (Hispanics excluded from racial categories) (NH = Non-Hispanic)
Race	Pop 2010	Pop 2020	% 2010	% 2020
White (NH)	511	405	51.72%	47.87%
Black or African American (NH)	88	82	8.91%	9.69%
Native American or Alaska Native (NH)	4	1	0.40%	0.12%
Asian (NH)	3	2	0.30%	0.24%
Pacific Islander or Native Hawaiian (NH)	0	1	0.00%	0.12%
Some other race (NH)	2	14	0.20%	1.65%
Two or more races/Multiracial (NH)	15	38	1.52%	4.49%
Hispanic or Latino (any race)	365	303	36.94%	35.82%
Total	988	846		

As of the 2020 United States census, there were 846 people, 322 households, and 212 families residing in the city.

As of the 2010 United States census, there were 988 people, 368 households, and 289 families residing in the city.

=== 2000 census ===
As of the census of 2000, there were 910 people, 282 households, and 212 families residing in the city. The population density was 531.8 inhabitants per square mile (205.3/km^{2}). There were 319 housing units at an average density of 186.4 per square mile (72.0/km^{2}). The racial makeup of the city was 79.9% White, 6.7% African American, 0.6% Native American, 0.6% Asian, 0.8% Pacific Islander, 9.5% from other races, and 2.1% from two or more races. Hispanic or Latino of any race were 28.9% of the population.

In 2000, there were 282 households, out of which 42.2% had children under the age of 18 living with them, 57.4% were married couples living together, 10.3% had a female householder with no husband present, and 24.8% were non-families. 20.9% of all households were made up of individuals, and 10.6% had someone living alone who was 65 years of age or older. The average household size was 3.20 and the average family size was 3.63.

In 2000, in the city, the population was spread out, with 36.2% under the age of 18, 9.5% from 18 to 24, 25.8% from 25 to 44, 17.6% from 45 to 64, and 11.0% who were 65 years of age or older. The median age was 28 years. For every 100 females, there were 117.7 males. For every 100 females age 18 and over, there were 106.0 males.

In 2000, the median income for a household in the city was $29,830, and the median income for a family was $30,156. Males had a median income of $27,279 versus $20,500 for females. The per capita income for the city was $13,546. About 19.2% of families and 26.2% of the population were below the poverty line, including 40.4% of those under age 18 and 13.7% of those age 65 or over.

== Agriculture ==
The city was once called the "Green Bean Capitol of the World," and is known locally to this day for the high quality of its soil.

== Industry ==
One of the leading industries in Center Hill is Central Beef Industries.

=== Central Beef Industries ===
In 2013, the Seminole Tribe partnered with Central Beef to slaughter and cut beef for the tribe's "Seminole Pride" brand.

Beginning in 1999, Central Beef disposed of 130,000 US gallons (492,103 liters) of wastewater containing high levels of sodium and fecal material per day into neighboring fields. Central Beef owner Marc Chernin offered to buy a neighboring rancher's land, but the rancher refused as he and his brother believed that the offer was too low. The ranchers attempted to informally resolve the issue by discussing it with Central Beef management, but they sued the beef processing plant in May 2006. Meanwhile, the Florida Department of Environmental Protection (DEP) issued warning letters in 2001. A 2003 consent order attempted to address the issue of contamination, but the company, citing insufficient funds to line the ponds around Central Beef, failed to stop the pollution. In 2005, plant manager Dick Greene documented his concerns about the pollution. The DEP began an investigation in April 2006. On August 24, 2006, the DEP arrested Chernin on charges of hazardous waste disposal and felony commercial littering. Chernin pleaded no contest to the charges in July 2007, and he was sentenced to one year's probation. The charge of hazardous waste disposal was eventually dropped. After the ranchers' and the DEP's lawsuits, Central Beef began transporting the wastewater off the premises.

== Notes ==
Covington, James W. (1993). The Seminoles of Florida. Gainesville, Florida: University Press of Florida. p. 33. ISBN 0-8130-1196-5.

Hatch, Thomas (2012). Osceola and the Great Seminole War. New York: St. Martin Press. pp. 59, 254. ISBN 978-0-312-35591-3.
