= Wahoo, Florida =

Unincorporated community in the United States

- Unincorporated community
- Location within Sumter County, Florida
- Coordinates: 28°41′26″N 82°11′44″W
- Country: United States
- State: Florida
- County: Sumter
- Elevation: 49 ft (15 m)

Population (2012)
  - Total: 2,673 (estimated)
  - Density: 870/sq mi (336.1/km^{2})
- Time zone: UTC-5 (Eastern (EST))
  - Summer (DST): UTC-4 (EDT)
- ZIP code: 33513
- Area code: 352
- FIPS code: 12-12119
- GNIS feature ID: 294963

Wahoo is an unincorporated community in Sumter County, Florida, United States. First settled by the Timucua, the area was eventually settled by the Seminoles. During the Second Seminole War, Wahoo and the surrounding area served as shelter to the Seminoles and as the site of several skirmishes. After the war, white settlers migrated to the area and established a thriving town.

Today, the rural community is connected to the nearby town of Bushnell. Wahoo is home to a middle-aged population whose ancestry mainly hails from Europe. As for the battle site, it is protected by the state of Florida for ecological purposes.

== History ==
=== Name ===
The origin of the town's name is unknown. The word "wahoo" itself does not appear in any of the native languages, but English settlers anglicized the Muskogee word "vhahwu" to "wahoo" circa 1770. Sumter County historians believe that the town's name is derived from the wahoo trees, or the winged elms, that grew in the area.

=== Early inhabitants ===
The Timucua were the first to arrive in the area of present-day Wahoo. The group of tribes formed the Paracoxi Confederacy, or Urribaracuxi, united under Chief Paracoxi. In May 1539, a group of Spanish explorers, led by Hernando de Soto passed near the area. Historians believe that the introduction of malaria by DeSoto's expedition spread throughout the river valleys and killed about two-thirds of the Timucuan population. Those who survived migrated to St. Augustine. During the Queen Anne's War, Colonel James Moore raided Timucua villages and either sent them to the allies or to prisons.

Members of the Upper Creek Seminole tribe settled in the area between 1767 and 1823, with most arriving following the Creek War of 1813-1814. Prior to the Creek War, the Creeks became concerned and angered over America's expansion into tribal lands. At the same time, the Creek National Council decided to use government annuity payments toward settling debts at the time where the Creek economy was transitioning from a trade economy to an agriculturally based economy. After several skirmishes between settlers and the Creeks, the Creek National Council publicly executed the offenders, a punishment traditionally performed by families. The Upper Creeks (Red Sticks) rebelled against the council. They attacked other Creeks who sided with the Americans. When the conflict ended in 1814, the war had killed about 15% of the Creeks and destroyed more than 48 towns in the Upper Creek territory in Alabama.

=== The Second Seminole War ===
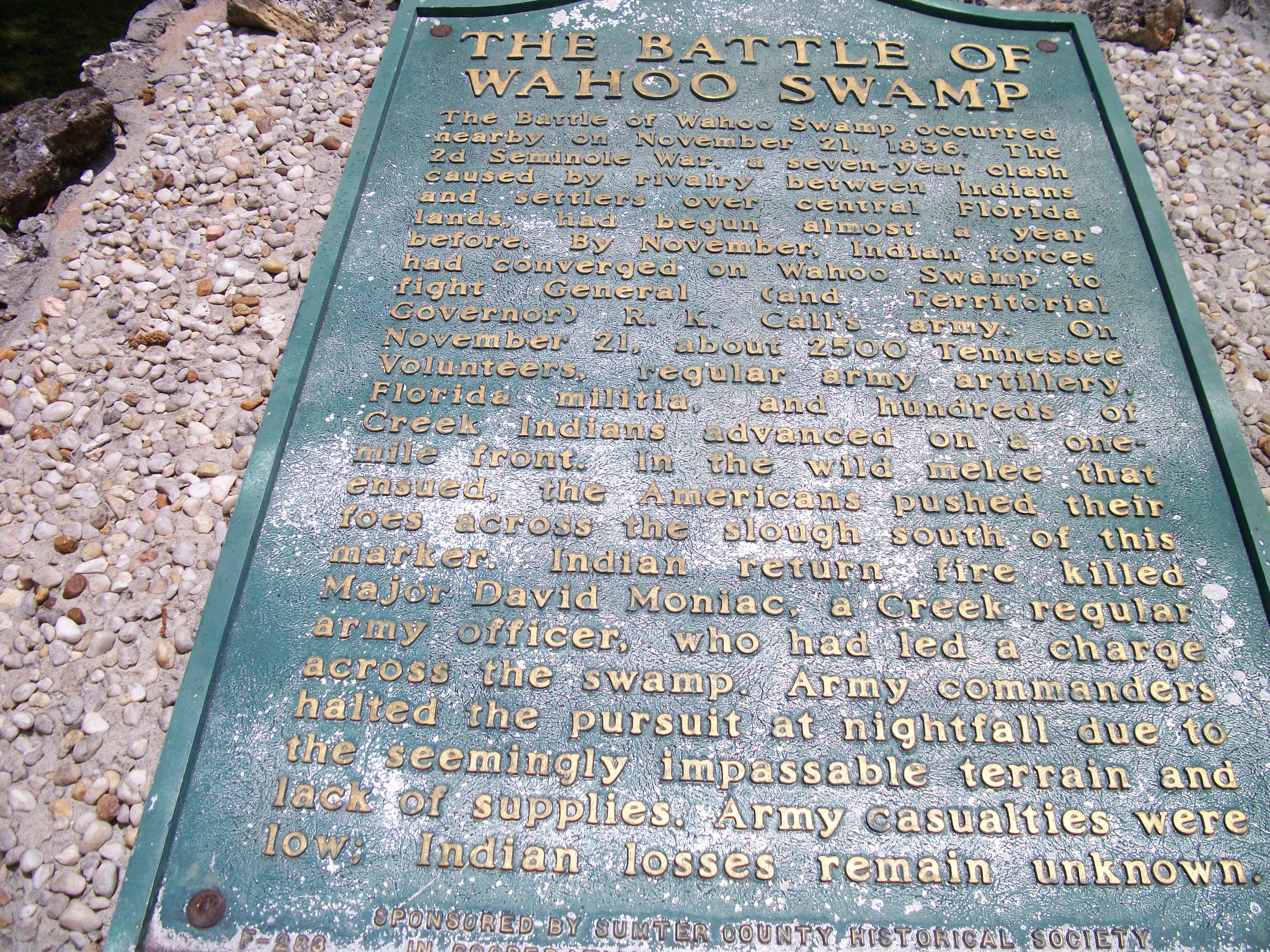
CR 48 DeSoto Trailhead - Battle of Wahoo Swamp Plaque

When the United States government negotiated the Treaty of Moultrie Creek in 1824, government officials placed the Wahoo Swamp area with the boundary of the second reservation located in present-day Central Florida. The Seminoles began moving there shortly after the signing of the treaty. The Seminoles' dependence on government rations after a famine caused by a late rainy season led to the federal government's decision to relocate the Seminoles to reservations west of the Mississippi River. The Seminole leaders, predominately Osceola and the Wahoo Swamp resident Chief Jumper, protested the move. In the meantime, white settlers violated the Treaty of Moultrie Creek by moving onto the public lands, and slave hunters trespassed onto the reservation to capture black Seminoles without proof of ownership.

After the murder of Charley Emathla, Seminoles living near Fort King began moving their families to the Wahoo Swamp for protection as hostilities between the Seminole and the United States Army increased. In late 1835, General Duncan Clinch planned to attack the families living in the towns in the Wahoo Swamp to start a war that would force the Seminoles' to comply with the Treaty of Payne's Landing. He ordered two companies, headed by Fraser and Gardiner to move from Fort Brooke (near present-day Tampa) to Fort King (in present-day Ocala). In early December 1835, General Clinch also gathered volunteers from various settlements in the area and regular soldiers in a company named the Florida Rangers and stationed them at his plantation "Auld Lang Syne" 35 miles (56 kilometers) north of the area and 10 miles (16 kilometers) south of the present-day town of Micanopy, Florida. As for the Seminoles, the Seminole men moved the women and children to another village for protection while the men stayed behind.

After Dade's Battle on December 28, 1835, the parties returned to the Wahoo Swamp 5 miles (8.0 kilometers) away. On December 29, 1835, General Duncan Clinch led the 250 regulars and 460 militiamen from his plantation toward the Wahoo Swamp. The army's guides led the men to a swift and deep spot in the Withlacoochee River. Osceola and Abraham, a freed slave who served as an interpreter during the negotiations of the Treaty of Payne's Landing, led 250 Seminole and 30 black Seminole in an ambush while Clinch's men were crossing the Withlacoochee River. The Battle of the Withlacoochee River ended when Clinch and his men dismounted from their horses and charged at the Seminole, who retreated into the swamp.

The army had several more skirmishes in the area during the war. In October 1836, Call began an expedition to destroy the village but had to abandon the trip as the detachment experienced food shortages and as they encountered a fire on the western bank of the Withlacoochee River. On November 13, 1836, Call and his men arrive at the village and found it abandoned. He and his men burned the village. On November 21, Call and his men, which included Captain William Seton Maitland, for whom the city of Maitland, Florida was named, encountered a group of 420 Seminole and 200 black Seminole, who returned fire and retreated into the swamp. Call's men retreated as they did not want to cross the deep black water. Killed in the battle was David Moniac, a 34-year-old West Point graduate who served with the Creek Volunteers. Maitland, suffering from malaria, was severely wounded in the battle, which led to his suicide in August 1837. His remains were buried near Wahoo until they were moved to Saint Augustine, Florida.

In May 1840, Brevet Brigadier General Walker Keith Armistead searched the area. In 1841, Lieutenant C.R. Gates of the 8th Infantry found three villages hidden by willow trees and accessible by canoe. The villages had pumpkin and cornfields and a coontie processing area. On January 25, 1842, Companies B & K 2nd Infantry and Detachment Company G 2nd Infantry, led by Major J. Plympton, captured two Seminole. Two soldiers were wounded, and one was killed during the skirmish. In addition, another battle occurred on February 12, 1842. In that skirmish, one soldier from Company H, 8th Infantry, led by 1st Lieutenant P. Smirsh, was killed and another was injured.

=== Post-settlement ===
Many white settlers migrated to the area from Alabama, Georgia, South Carolina, and North Carolina in the mid- to late-1800s, as, according to John Lee Williams, an author who explored the northern and central portions of Florida in the 1830s, the Wahoo Swamp area was excellent for the cultivation of sugar cane. Finding fields that had been cultivated by the Seminole, the settlers settled in five distinct communities in the area: Gum Slough (first settled in 1845), Bay Hill, Hay's Ferry, Wahoo, and Weed's Landing. Between 1846 and the 1890s, the town had a Baptist church (which remains today), stores, and a sawmill. Most of the community's residents stayed at home, although at least one resident visited Bushnell.

In 1994, the Sumter County Board of Commissioners planned to move Wahoo residents' fire protection from the Bushnell fire department to the Tri-County fire department in Nobleton, Florida. The move would have increased the share of the county fire assessment revenue for other towns in the county. Wahoo residents protested, stating that they preferred the Bushnell fire department's plan to provide the town with a substation. The Bushnell fire department's plan was to address the issues of the length of response to calls, which averaged between 15 and 18 minutes to reach Wahoo, and the potential for delays caused by CSX trains traveling through the Bushnell city limits.

Seeking to protect the site of the Battle of the Wahoo Swamp, the Sumter County Historical Society applied in 2002 to have the 850-acre site placed under the protection of the state of Florida. The Florida Acquisition and Restoration Council granted the application and placed the site on the 2003 Florida Forever Priority list for the area's biodiversity.

== Geography ==
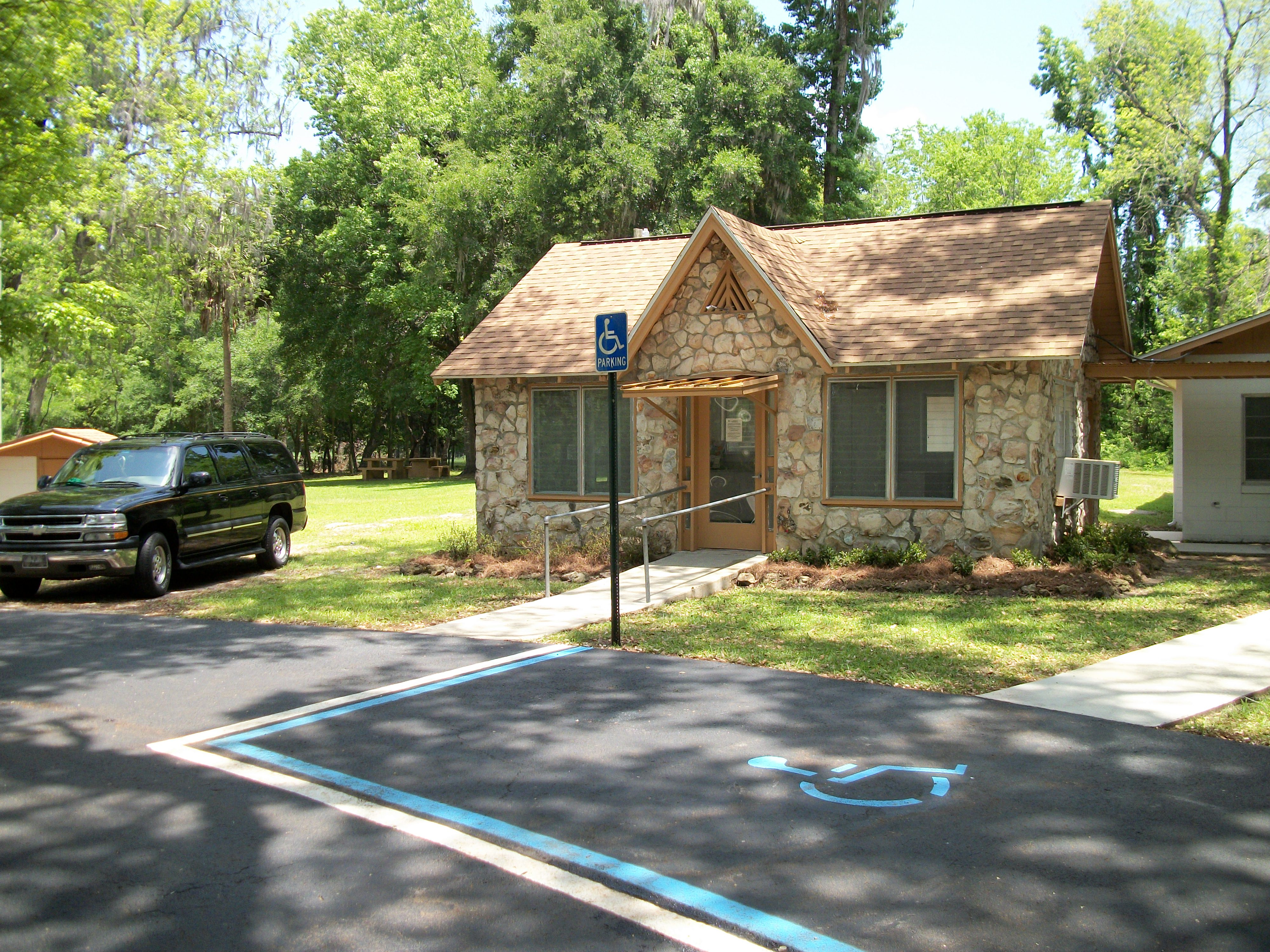
CR 48 DeSoto Trailhead Shelter

The town of Wahoo is located at 28°41′26″ N and 82°11′44″ W (28.6905462, -82.1956434). It has an elevation of 49 feet (15 meters) above sea level. Both the town of Bushnell, Florida and Interstate 75 lie six miles (9.7 kilometers) to the east while County Road 48 runs through the town. County Road 48 enters Wahoo from the west and turns south as it exits the town en route to Bushnell. About 0.2 miles (0.32 kilometers) north of the site of the battle lies the Jumper Creek Wildlife Management Area, a tract of the Withlacoochee State Forest managed by the Florida Department of Agriculture and Consumer Services. The town is considered to be a part of Bushnell, Florida.

== Climate ==
The average low for the month of January is 45.5 °F (7.5 °C) while the average high is 70.9 °F (21.6 °C). In July, the average high is 91.5 °F (33.1 °C) while lows average 70.5 °F (21.4 °C). The average precipitation from April 1, 1918, to April 30, 2012, was 50.04 inches (127.1 centimeters). No snow fell during that period.

== Ecology ==
The town of Wahoo has four different types of soil: Kanapaha sand, Ft. Green fine sand, Adamsville fine sand, and Sparr fine sand. All four soils are poorly drained and slowly permeable that formed in marine sediments; they also support forest areas. Ft. Green fine sand is a dark gray soil that is poorly drained. Ft. Green fine sand is found adjacent to flood plains. These sands formed from the Middle Eocene to the Holocene period. Under the soils lay limestone.

The nearby Wahoo Swamp has several areas, or "islands", of hardwood hammocks surrounded by freshwater marsh and cypress swamp. The area is home to a rare limestone habitat that can support ferns and orchids; most other similar habitats have been mined or drained. The area also has over 250 rare native plants, including several rare ferns and orchids.

== Demographics ==
According to the United States Census Bureau's American Community Surveys from 2008 to 2012, Wahoo had an estimated population of 2,673. The median age of the population was 52.4, compared to the Sumter County median age of 62.0.

In 2012, the median income for Wahoo residents was estimated to be US$31,951, compared to US$53,046, the median income of Sumter County residents in general. About 27.6% of Wahoo's population earned between US$15,000 and US$24,999; 1.6% earned less than that while the remaining population earned more. Those who earned a bachelor's degree had median earnings of US$16,488, which was less than the median earnings of US$25,595 for the rest of the population. In 2012, 20.1% of the population lived in poverty. Although those who did not complete high school had median earnings that were higher than those who graduated with bachelor's degrees, 26.7% lived in poverty. About 23.4% of the population received food stamps and SNAP benefits. About 54.2% of residents received a Social Security Income, with a mean earnings of US$18,177 while 9.6% received an average Supplemental Security Income of US$7,776.

Between 2008 and 2012, Wahoo had an unemployment rate of 7.6% while 55.6% were not in the labor force. Of the 44.4% of the population in the labor force, 23.9% of Wahoo's population worked in the professional, management, and administrative services. About 15.9% worked in education, health care, and social services. About 11.3% worked in transportation and utilities. Manufacturing employed 10.0% of the population while food services, recreation, and entertainment employed 9.9%. Other Wahoo residents worked in the retail industry (8.5%), construction (7.0%), public administration (4.1%), and other industries (3.5%). About 8.1% worked at home. Agriculture, forestry, and mining employed about 5.9% of Wahoo residents.

In addition, an estimated 35.7% of residents have a high school diploma. About 15.6% of the population have some college credits. About 8.7% hold associate degrees while 6.3% have bachelor's degrees and 4.1% hold either a graduate degree or a professional degree.

The majority of the population (88.7%) is Caucasian. About 6.5% is African-American, 4.0% is of Asian descent, and 0.9% is of Hispanic or Latino origin. An estimated 1.9% is biracial. The predominant ancestries are Irish (19.7%), German (16.7%), English (15.9%), and American (8.9%). Other ancestries include French (with the exception of the Basque) (5.9%), Dutch (2.8%), Danish (2.6%), Scottish-Irish (2.0%), West Indian (with the exception of Hispanic origin groups) (1.9%), Polish (1.8%), Italian (1.4%), French Canadian (0.7%), and Swedish (0.6%).

About 94.8% of Wahoo residence were born in the United States, and about 42.8% were born in Florida. Of the foreign born population, 55.5% were born in Asia, 31.3% were born in Northern America, while 13.3% were born in Latin America. The majority of foreign-born Wahoo residents (89.8%) migrated to the area before 2010. An estimated 93.4% speak only English while the other 6.6% speak Spanish (3.6%), Asian and Pacific Islander languages (2.8%), and other Indo-European languages (0.3%).

== Transportation ==
According to the United States Census Bureau, 72.9% drove to work in their cars, trucks, or vans. About 9.4% carpooled. Approximately 1.6% relied on public transportation to commute to work. Others did not have far to travel; an estimated 8.0% of the population walked to work. An estimated 24.3% of Wahoo residents commuted outside of Sumter County. The mean commute time was 22.2 minutes. For library services, the Sumter County Board of County Commissioners' Library Services Libraries on Wheels Program stops at the Wahoo First Baptist Church during the month.

== Local attractions ==
Operated by the Sumter County Board of County Commissioners, the Wahoo Community Building and its grounds are a combination of a community building and a historical monument. The building itself has two meeting rooms. The park surrounding the building has six picnic tables and two grills. The Wahoo Historical Monument is located in the park. The plaque, sponsored by the Sumter County Historical Society and the Florida Department of State, describes the events of the Battle of Wahoo Swamp. In September 1977, the Sumter County Board of County Commissioners authorized the placement of the plaque on the grounds of the Wahoo Community Center.
