= Nobleton, Florida =

- Census-designated place
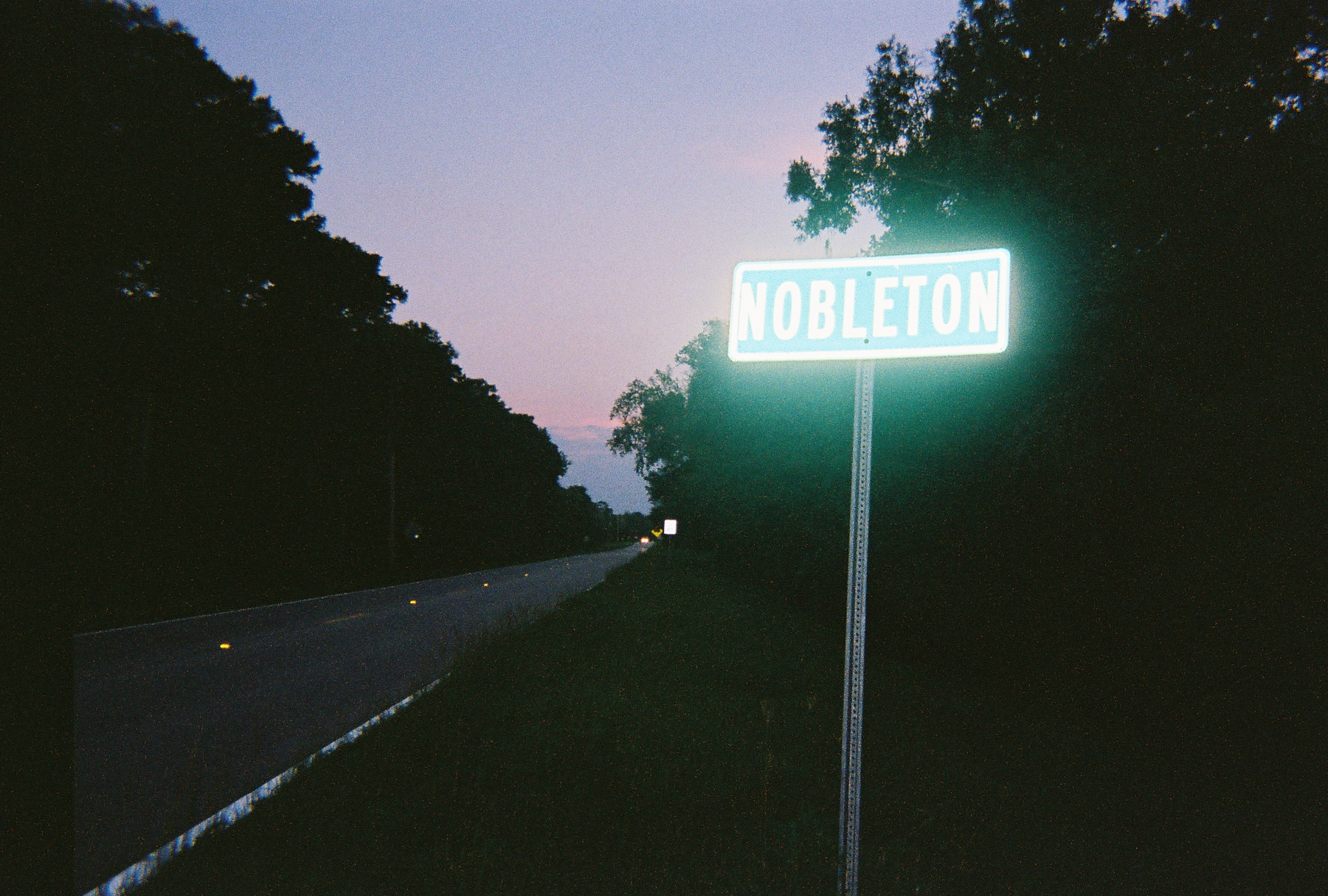
- CR 476 entering Nobleton

- Location in Hernando County and the state of Florida
- Coordinates: 28°38′43″N 82°15′43″W
- Country: United States
- State: Florida
- County: Hernando

Area
  - Total: 0.20 sq mi (0.52 km^{2})
  - Land: 0.19 sq mi (0.49 km^{2})
  - Water: 0.012 sq mi (0.03 km^{2})
- Elevation: 59 ft (18 m)

Population (2020)
  - Total: 232
  - Density: 1,231.4/sq mi (475.46/km^{2})
- Time zone: UTC-5 (Eastern (EST))
  - Summer (DST): UTC-4 (EDT)
- ZIP code: 34661
- Area code: 352
- FIPS code: 12-48825
- GNIS feature ID: 2403337

Nobleton is an unincorporated community and census-designated place (CDP) in Hernando County, Florida, United States. As of the 2020 census, Nobleton had a population of 232.

== Geography ==
Nobleton is located in northeastern Hernando County on the southwest bank of the Withlacoochee River, which forms the border with Sumter County. Via County Road 476 it is 10 miles (16 km) west of Bushnell and 5 miles (8 km) east of U.S. Route 41 at a point 6 miles (10 km) north of Brooksville, the Hernando County seat.

According to the United States Census Bureau, the CDP has a total area of 0.5 square kilometres (0.2 sq mi), of which 0.01 square miles (0.03 km^{2}), or 6.61%, are water.

== Demographics ==
Historical population
Census	Pop.	Note	%±
2020	232		—
U.S. Decennial Census

As of the census of 2000, there were 160 people, 77 households, and 46 families residing in the CDP. The population density was 812.1 inhabitants per square mile (313.6/km^{2}). There were 146 housing units at an average density of 741.0 per square mile (286.1/km^{2}). The racial makeup of the CDP was 99.38% White, and 0.62% from two or more races. Hispanic or Latino of any race were 1.88% of the population.

There were 77 households, out of which 20.8% had children under the age of 18 living with them, 45.5% were married couples living together, 10.4% had a female householder with no husband present, and 39.0% were non-families. 32.5% of all households were made up of individuals, and 28.6% had someone living alone who was 65 years of age or older. The average household size was 2.08 and the average family size was 2.55.

In the CDP, the population was spread out, with 19.4% under the age of 18, 2.5% from 18 to 24, 26.9% from 25 to 44, 21.3% from 45 to 64, and 30.0% who were 65 years of age or older. The median age was 46 years. For every 100 females, there were 107.8 males. For every 100 females age 18 and over, there were 89.7 males.

The median income for a household in the CDP was $25,417, and the median income for a family was $25,139. Males had a median income of $52,656 versus $31,250 for females. The per capita income for the CDP was $9,782. About 48.5% of families and 50.8% of the population were below the poverty line, including 80.0% of those under the age of eighteen and none of those 65 or over.

== See also ==
- Withlacoochee State Trail
- Nobleton Wayside Park
