= Rutland, Florida =

- Unincorporated community
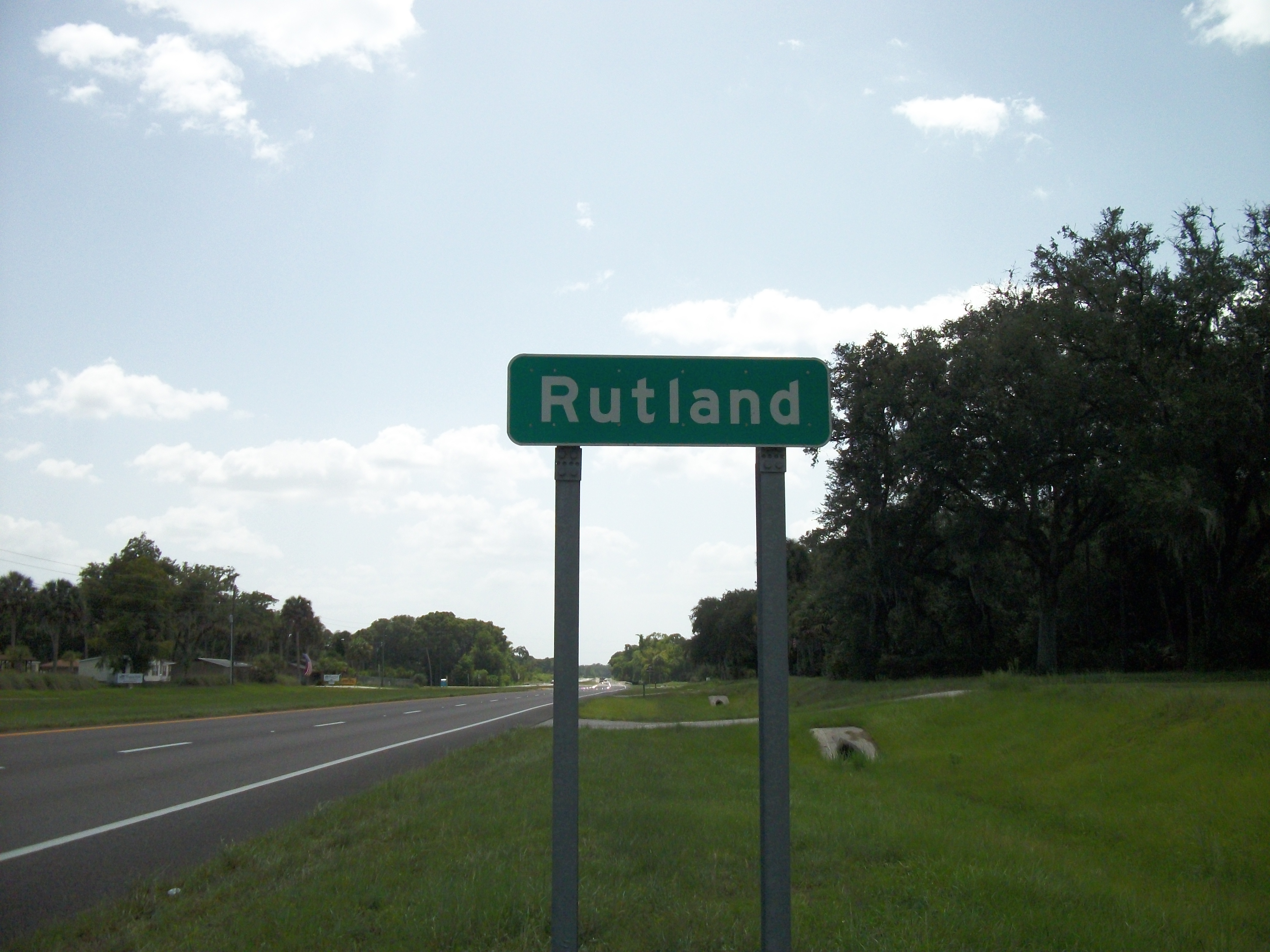
- Sign along westbound State Road 44 as it enters Rutland.

- Location within Florida
- Coordinates: 28°51′11″N 82°12′48″W
- Country: United States
- State: Florida
- County: Sumter
- Elevation: 46 ft (14 m)
- Time zone: UTC-5 (Eastern (EST))
  - Summer (DST): UTC-4 (EDT)
- ZIP code: 33585
- Area code: 352
- GNIS feature ID: 294915

Rutland is an unincorporated community in Sumter County, Florida, United States. The ZIP Code is 33538, which it shares with Lake Panasoffkee, over nine miles to the southeast.

== Geography ==
Rutland is bordered by the Withlacoochee River to the southwest, Lake Panasoffkee to the southeast, Marion Oaks and rural Marion County to the north, and Wildwood to the east.

== Transportation and Economy ==
The main road through Rutland is State Road 44 which enters Sumter County by crossing over a bridge above the Withlacoochee River. Other roads include County Road 247, and County Road 470. The primary industries are farming and recreation. An airboat tour company is also located in town.
