= Battle of Withlacoochee =

Coordinates: 28.991640°N 82.759551°W

- Part of Second Seminole War
Date	December 31, 1835
Location	Near Withlacoochee River, Florida
Result	American victory

Belligerents
United States	Seminole Indians

Commanders and leaders
Duncan L. Clinch; Richard K. Call	Osceola

Strength
750	250

Casualties and losses
4 killed 59 wounded	Unknown

The Battle of Withlacoochee took place during the Second Seminole War on December 31, 1835, along the Withlacoochee River in modern Citrus County, Florida.

== Prelude ==
The Indian Removal Act of 1830 resulted in conflict between the Seminole, Mikasuki, Creek and other allied tribes and the U.S. Army in the Territory of Florida. This conflict culminated with the Dade battle, which many consider the start to the Second Seminole War. Unaware of what had happened to Major Dade and his column only a few days prior, a U.S. force was dispatched to destroy a Seminole band who were residing at what was called "the Cove," on the southwest side of the Withlacoochee River.

On December 31, 1835, the column of soldiers with Gen. Duncan L. Clinch, leading regular U.S. troops, and Richard K. Call, leading militia, came to the Withlacoochee River. Most of the volunteer militia men had only been signed on for three weeks, the U.S. military commanders believing that it would take only that amount of time to crush the Seminole resistance.

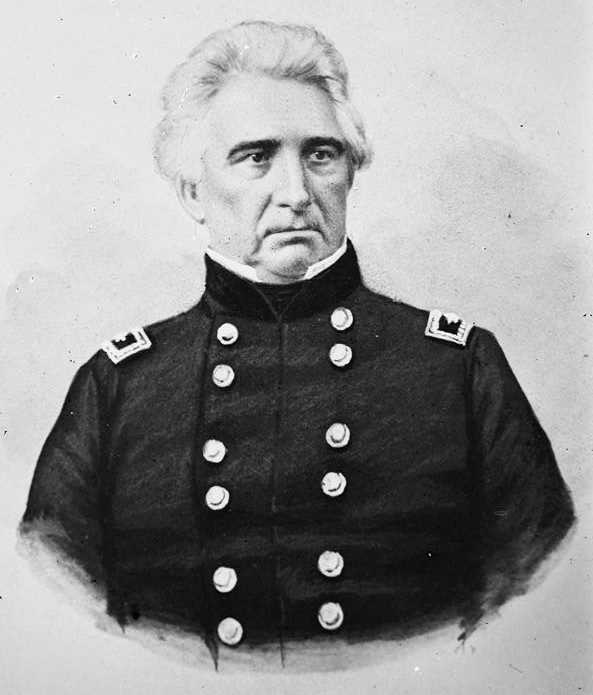
Duncan Lamont Clinch

At the time, Clinch and the rest of his command were still unaware of the U.S. defeat during the Dade battle, which had occurred only 3 days prior.

== Battle ==
The regular troops began to cross the river first but they only had a single canoe so the crossing was slow. Some of the militia began to cross by swimming their horses across but had to leave their clothes and weapons on the bank before crossing. The river was also higher than expected.

When roughly 225 of the U.S. soldiers had crossed, the Seminole who were laying in ambush opened fire. General Call, having made a footbridge of logs, was trying to get his men across as fast as possible when the attack began. He now left them with orders to cross as rapidly as they could, and crossed in the canoe himself while the fight was at the worst. As many of the volunteers as could do so crossed during the fight, thus preventing the Indians from getting between the regular troops and the river, and so cutting them off. Officer Leigh Read, who was eventually appointed brigadier general of the Florida militia during the war, was wounded during the action.
