= Bushnell, Florida =

- City
- City of Bushnell
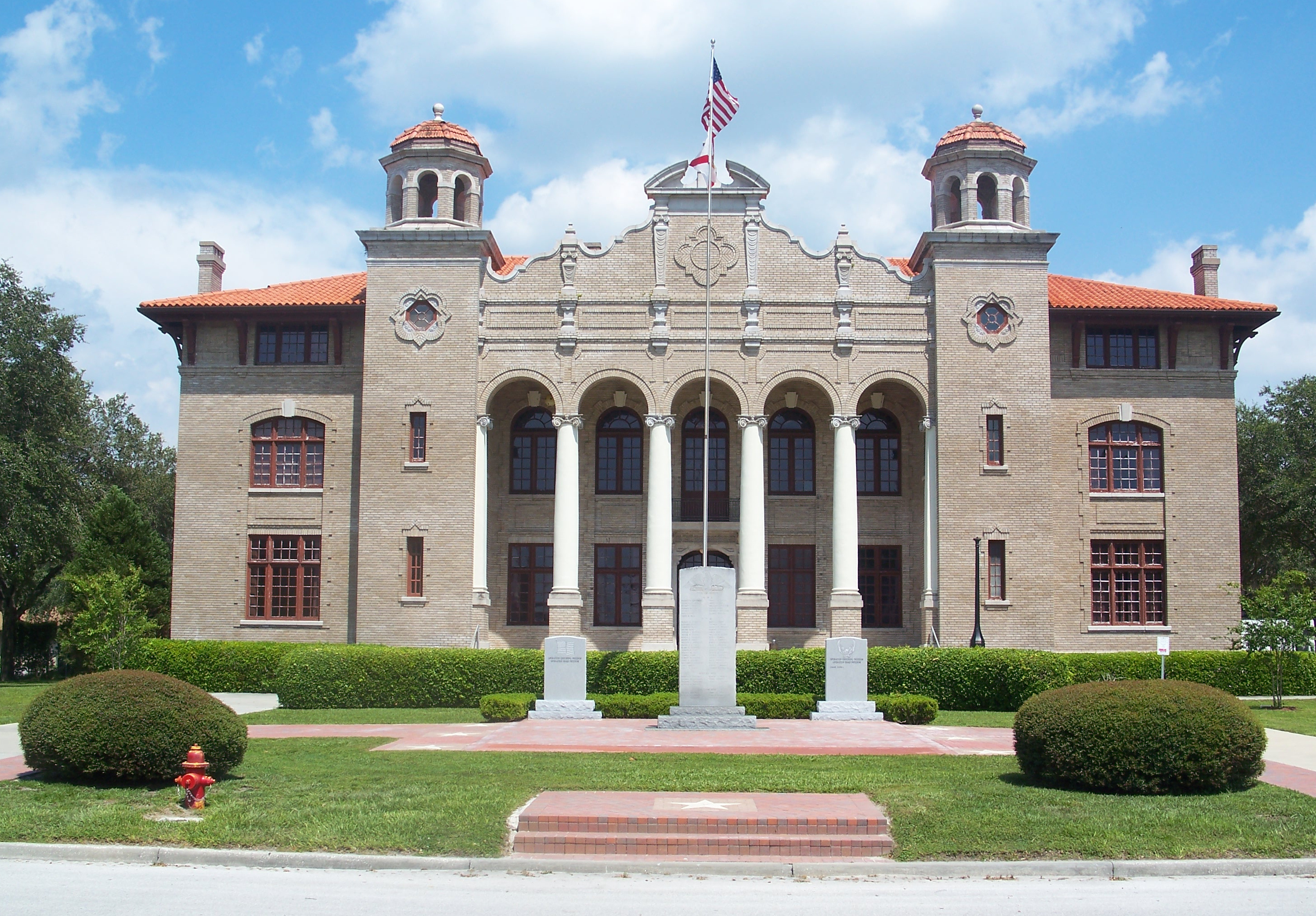
- Sumter County Courthouse

- Seal
- Motto: "Committed to the Quality of Life"
- Location in Sumter County and the state of Florida
- Coordinates: 28°39′54″N 82°07′46″W
- Country: United States
- State: Florida
- County: Sumter
- Settled: c. 1870–October 28, 1885
- Incorporated: December 14, 1911

Government
  - Type: Council–Manager
  - Mayor: Dale Barnes
  - Vice Mayor: Victoria "Tori" Summerlin
  - Council Members: Karen Davis, Jordan Dietz, and David Fry
  - City Manager: Michael Eastburn
  - City Clerk: Christina Lori Dixon

Area
  - Total: 12.70 sq mi (32.90 km^{2})
  - Land: 12.42 sq mi (32.16 km^{2})
  - Water: 0.29 sq mi (0.74 km^{2})
- Elevation: 62 ft (19 m)

Population (2020)
  - Total: 3,047
  - Density: 245.4/sq mi (94.76/km^{2})
- Time zone: UTC-5 (Eastern (EST))
  - Summer (DST): UTC-4 (EDT)
- ZIP code: 33513
- Area code: 352
- FIPS code: 12-09625
- GNIS ID: 2403958
- Website: cityofbushnellfl.com

Bushnell is a city in and the county seat of Sumter County, Florida, United States. The population was 3,047 at the 2020 census. It is part of The Villages metropolitan area, which consists of all of Sumter County and is included in the Orlando–Lakeland–Deltona combined statistical area.

== History ==
The first non-indigenous settler in Bushnell was recorded in 1870, and five to six families started to move there once the post office opened on October 28, 1885. It was named after John W. Bushnell, a chief engineer who was responsible for bringing the railroad to the community. The city is also home to Dade Battlefield Historic State Park, a park where on December 28, 1835, Seminoles ambushed 107 men in the forested area. Only 3 survivors came out of Dade Battlefield, and the battle signaled the beginning of the Second Seminole War. The City of Bushnell was officially incorporated as a municipality on December 14, 1911.

== Geography ==
Bushnell is located in west-central Sumter County. The area around Bushnell is relatively flat, with some forested areas belonging to the state and rivers, creeks, and small streams that flow underneath roadways with bridges.

=== Climate ===
The City of Bushnell is part of the humid subtropical climate zone with a Köppen Climate Classification of "Cfa" (C = mild temperate, f = fully humid, and a = hot summer).

== Demographics ==
Historical population
Census	Pop.	Note	%±
1920	400		—
1930	591		47.8%
1940	676		14.4%
1950	536		−20.7%
1960	644		20.1%
1970	700		8.7%
1980	983		40.4%
1990	1,998		103.3%
2000	2,050		2.6%
2010	2,418		18.0%
2020	3,047		26.0%
U.S. Decennial Census

=== Racial and ethnic composition ===
Bushnell racial composition (Hispanics excluded from racial categories) (NH = Non-Hispanic)
Race	Pop 2010	Pop 2020	% 2010	% 2020
White (NH)	1,840	2,194	76.10%	72.01%
Black or African American (NH)	304	343	12.57%	11.26%
Native American or Alaska Native (NH)	16	17	0.66%	0.56%
Asian (NH)	12	19	0.50%	0.62%
Pacific Islander or Native Hawaiian (NH)	0	6	0.00%	0.20%
Some other race (NH)	7	18	0.29%	0.59%
Two or more races/Multiracial (NH)	44	119	1.82%	3.91%
Hispanic or Latino (any race)	195	331	8.06%	10.86%
Total	2,418	3,047		

=== 2020 census ===
As of the 2020 census, Bushnell had a population of 3,047. The median age was 48.5 years. 16.4% of residents were under the age of 18 and 31.5% were 65 years of age or older. For every 100 females there were 103.9 males, and for every 100 females age 18 and over there were 98.6 males age 18 and over.

94.0% of residents lived in urban areas, while 6.0% lived in rural areas.

There were 1,229 households in Bushnell, of which 21.6% had children under the age of 18 living in them. Of all households, 40.3% were married-couple households, 16.8% were households with a male householder and no spouse or partner present, and 36.4% were households with a female householder and no spouse or partner present. About 36.1% of all households were made up of individuals, and 22.6% had someone living alone who was 65 years of age or older.

There were 1,701 housing units, of which 27.7% were vacant. The homeowner vacancy rate was 1.5% and the rental vacancy rate was 9.7%.

The 2020 American Community Survey 5-year estimates reported 776 families residing in the city.

=== 2010 census ===
As of the 2010 United States census, there were 2,418 people, 1,400 households, and 906 families residing in the city.

=== 2000 census ===
At the 2000 census there were 2,050 people in 830 households, including 538 families, in the city. The population density was 871.7 inhabitants per square mile (336.6/km^{2}). There were 1,004 housing units at an average density of 426.9 units per square mile (164.8 units/km^{2}). The racial makeup of the city was 83.37% White, 12.98% African American, 0.34% Native American, 0.73% Asian, 1.27% from other races, and 1.32% from two or more races. Hispanic or Latino of any race were 3.56%.

Of the 830 households in 2000, 25.4% had children under the age of 18 living with them, 49.4% were married couples living together, 12.4% had a female householder with no husband present, and 35.1% were non-families. 31.2% of households were one person and 17.7% were one person aged 65 or older. The average household size was 2.25 and the average family size was 2.79.

In 2000, the age distribution was 20.6% under the age of 18, 8.8% from 18 to 24, 23.3% from 25 to 44, 21.5% from 45 to 64, and 25.8% 65 or older. The median age was 43 years. For every 100 females, there were 90.2 males. For every 100 females age 18 and over, there were 85.4 males.

In 2000, the median household income was $26,676 and the median family income was $34,063. Males had a median income of $27,986 versus $23,125 for females. The per capita income for the city was $14,737. About 11.0% of families and 14.7% of the population were below the poverty line, including 17.5% of those under age 18 and 13.4% of those age 65 or over.

== Government and infrastructure ==
Sumter County operates Bushnell Annex in Room 201 at 910 North Main Street.

== Transportation ==
The main roads through Bushnell include US 301 which runs north and south through the city. County Road 48 (CR 48, and also SR 48) and County Road 476 (CR 476) run east and west, and have short concurrency with US 301, as well as each other.

Interstate 75 (I-75) runs along the western edge of Bushnell with Exit 314 leading to CR 48. County Road 475 (CR 475) begins at CR 48 and runs the CSX Wildwood Subdivision, which carried Amtrak's Palmetto until 2004. The Wildwood Subdivision runs along US 301 from north of the Hernando-Sumter County Line, to Bushnell until US 301 turns onto East Noble Avenue. From there it runs along the east side of CR 48 until that route turns west onto West Belt Avenue, then follows the east side of CR 475 until its terminus at Exit 321 on I-75 at County Road 470 (CR 470) in Lake Panasoffkee.

Bushnell also runs a small transit bus, that follows a daily route around the city's main attractions and busiest areas.

== Education ==
Sumter District Schools headquarters and South Sumter High School are located in Bushnell.
