= Withlacoochee River (Florida) =

River in Florida, U.S.

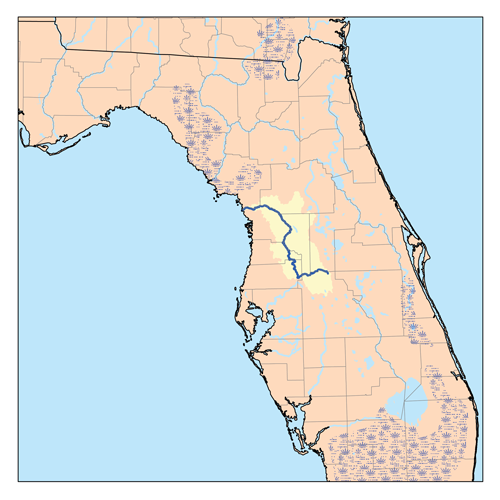
Course of the southern Withlacoochee River

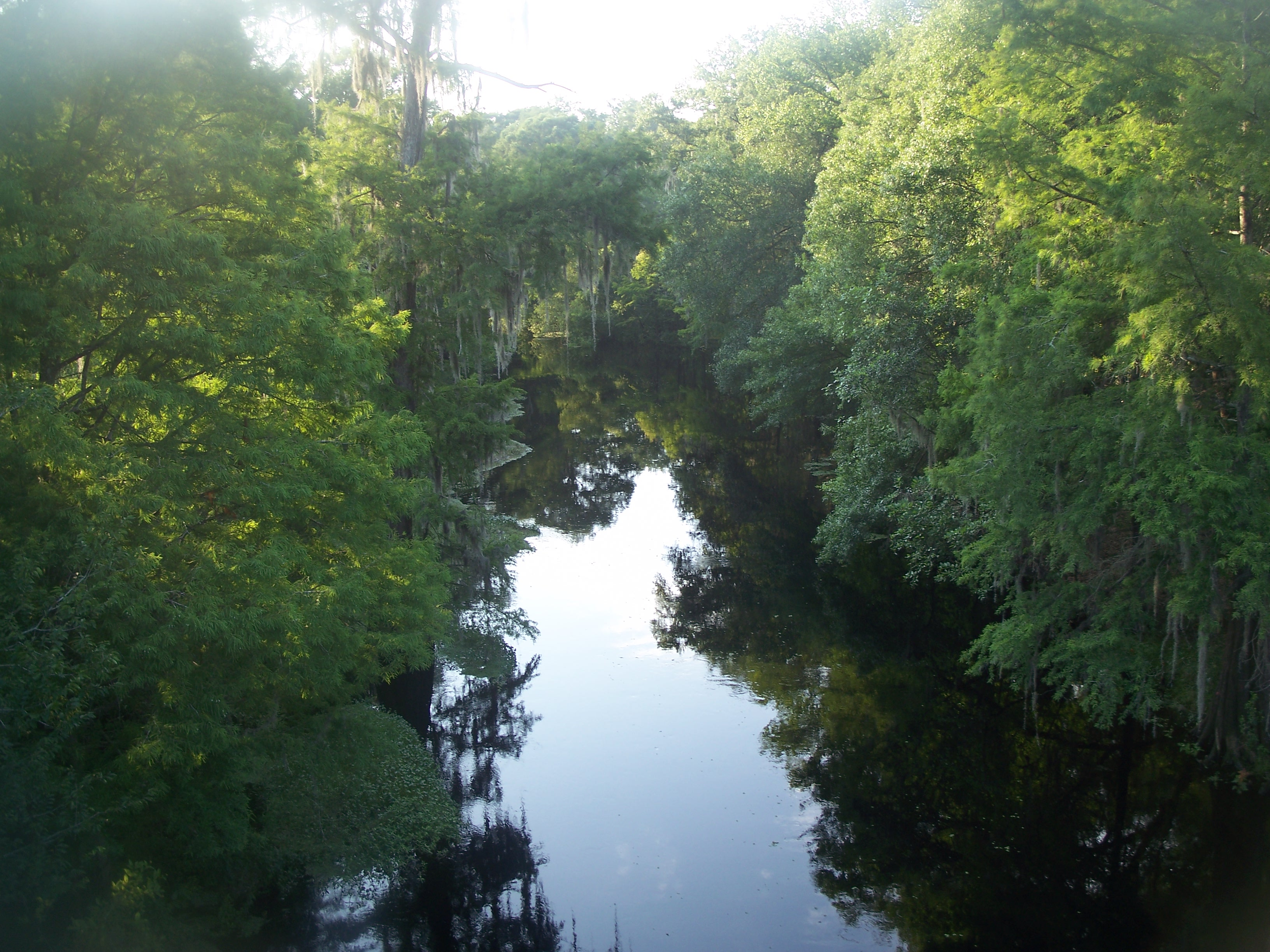
Withlacoochee River, looking east in Hernando County, just north of the Pasco County border

The Withlacoochee River or Crooked River is a river in central Florida, in the United States. It originates in the Green Swamp, east of Polk City, flowing west, then north, then northwest and finally west again before emptying into the Gulf of Mexico near Yankeetown. The river is 141 miles (227 km) long and has a drainage basin of 1,170 square miles (3,000 km^{2}).

Along the route of central Florida's Withlacoochee River is the 46-mile-long (74 km) Withlacoochee State Trail, the longest paved rail trail in Florida; the Cypress Lake Preserve, a 324-acre (1.31 km^{2}) park with approximately 600 feet (180 m) of frontage; and Nobleton Wayside Park, a 2-acre (8,100 m^{2}) park in Nobleton that includes a boat ramp, shelter, basketball court, and picnic tables.

The Southwest Florida Water Management District operates a 5,484-acre (2,219 ha) nature preserve and recreational area with 3.7 miles (6.0 km) of frontage on the Withlacoochee River in Citrus County. The property was purchased for $13.5 million in 2005 from the South Florida Council, which had used it as the McGregor Smith Scout Reservation.

The Withlacoochee River flows through Pasco and Hernando counties, and then forms part of the boundary between Hernando County and Sumter County and all of the boundary between Citrus County and Sumter County, between Citrus County and Marion County and between Citrus County and Levy County (including Lake Rousseau). The largest city close to the river is Dade City.

Tsala Apopka Lake is an area composed of a number of lakes, swamps and marshes interspersed with islands located in Citrus County within the bend of the river where it turns from north flowing to west flowing. The area was historically connected to the river by wetlands. Starting in the 1880s, canals were dug connecting the river to various parts of the lake area. The area of Tsala Apopka Lake historically has been known as the "Cove of the Withlacoochee".

== History ==
During the Second Seminole War, Seminole chief Osceola founded a camp of fellow Seminole and escaped slaves called the Cove of the Withlacoochee. On December 31, 1835, the Battle of Withlacoochee was fought at the cove. It was one of the first engagements of the war.

In the 1890s, logs, stumps, and other debris were removed from the river to facilitate the travel of barges carrying phosphate to Port Inglis. Phosphate continued to move along the river this way until WWI, when shipping lanes were closed, and then by the early 1930s, the phosphate deposits were completely depleted.

== Etymology ==
"Withlacoochee" probably stems from a Muskhogean dialect, which suggests that its application is comparatively recent. It is compounded of Creek we (water), thlako (big), and chee (little), or little big water. This word combination signifies little river in the Creek language, and as we-lako or wethlako may also refer to a lake, it may signify a river of lakes, or lake river. An alternate etymology holds that Withlacoochee is a Native American word meaning "crooked river", which accurately describes the river as it makes its 70-mile (110 km) journey from the Green Swamp in northern Polk County to the Gulf of Mexico at Yankeetown.

== List of crossings ==
Crossing	Carries	Image	Location	Coordinates
Headwaters (Green Swamp)				28°21′39″N 81°49′8″W
160210	SR 33		Lake-Polk County Line.	28°21′39″N 81°49′8″W
140018	SR 471		Sumter-Pasco-Polk County Line.	28°18′47″N 82°3′21″W
	River Road (The Lanier Bridge)		Withlacoochee River County Park, East of Dade City	
	Former ACL Railroad Bridge (Orange Belt Railway)		Withlacoochee State Forest; Richloam WMA	
140031	SR 575		Lacoochee	28°28′34″N 82°9′22″W
	CSX S-Line (Wildwood Subdivision)		Lacoochee	28°28′39″N 82°9′46″W
080030	US 301		Lacoochee	28°28′48″N 82°10′40″W
140066	US 98		Trilby	28°28′36″N 82°11′45″W
	US 98-SR 50; Cortez Boulevard		Ridge Manor	28°31′8″N 82°12′34″W
Confluence with Little Withlacoochee River			River Junction State Park	28°34′21″N 82°12′0″W
080026 (NB); 080025 (SB)	Interstate 75		Silver Lake	28°34′47″N 82°13′2″W
184019	CR 476		Nobleton	28°38′40″N 82°15′26″W
184006	CR 48		Bay Hill	28°43′26″N 82°14′31″W
020004 (EB); 020003 (WB)	SR 44; Gulf-Atlantic Highway		Rutland	28°51′6″N 82°13′17″W
020008	SR 200		Stoke's Ferry	28°59′19″N 82°20′59″W
	Former San Jose Boulevard Bridge		Dunnellon-Citrus Springs	29°2′34″N 82°27′26″W
	Dunnellon Trail Bridge; Abandoned Seaboard Air Line Railroad line		Dunnellon-Citrus Springs	29°2′34″N 82°27′26″W
	CSX Citrus Springs-Dunnellon Bridge		Citrus Springs-Dunnellon	29°2′43″N 82°27′51″W
Brittan Alexander Bridge; 020026	US 41; Main Street		Citrus Springs-Dunnellon	29°2′45″N 82°27′53″W
020920 (NB); 020005 (SB)	US 19 98		Red Level-Inglis	29°1′31″N 82°40′9″W
Mouth (Gulf of Mexico)				28°59′39″N 82°45′30″W

== See also ==
- South Atlantic-Gulf Water Resource Region – US hydrologic region
- Withlacoochee State Forest – Forest in Florida
