= National Register of Historic Places listings in Sumter County, Florida =

Location of Sumter County in Florida

This is a list of the National Register of Historic Places listings in Sumter County, Florida.

This is intended to be a complete list of the properties on the National Register of Historic Places in Sumter County, Florida, United States. The locations of National Register properties for which the latitude and longitude coordinates are included below, may be seen in a map.

There are 4 properties listed on the National Register in the county, including 1 National Historic Landmark.

This National Park Service list is complete through NPS recent listings posted February 20, 2026.

Contents: Counties in Florida (non-linked contain no National Register listings)
Alachua - Baker - Bay - Bradford - Brevard - Broward - Calhoun - Charlotte - Citrus - Clay - Collier - Columbia - DeSoto - Dixie - Duval - Escambia - Flagler - Franklin - Gadsden - Gilchrist - Glades - Gulf - Hamilton - Hardee - Hendry - Hernando - Highlands - Hillsborough (Tampa) - Holmes - Indian River - Jackson - Jefferson - Lafayette - Lake - Lee - Leon - Levy - Liberty - Madison - Manatee - Marion - Martin - Miami-Dade (Miami) - Monroe - Nassau - Okaloosa - Okeechobee - Orange - Osceola - Palm Beach - Pasco - Pinellas - Polk - Putnam - St. Johns - St. Lucie - Santa Rosa - Sarasota - Seminole - Sumter - Suwannee - Taylor - Union - Volusia - Wakulla - Walton - Washington

== Current listings ==
	Name on the Register	Image	Date listed	Location	City or town	Description
1	Community of Royal Rural Historic District		February 26, 2026 (#100009226)	Bounded by Cty. Rd. 475, Cty. Rd. 216A, Cty. Rd. 223, and US Hwy 44; 28°53′45″N 82°05′41″W	Wildwood vicinity	
2	Dade Battlefield Historic Memorial	Dade Battlefield Historic Memorial	April 14, 1972 (#72000353)	1 mile west of Bushnell off U.S. Route 301; 28°39′08″N 82°07′36″W	Bushnell	
3	Thomas R. Pierce House	Thomas R. Pierce House	February 16, 1996 (#96000022)	202 West Noble Avenue; 28°39′54″N 82°06′48″W	Bushnell	
4	Wild Cow Prairie Cemetery	Wild Cow Prairie Cemetery	February 2, 2021 (#100006119)	5822 Cty. Rd. 673; 28°36′08″N 82°12′08″W	Bushnell	

== See also ==
- List of National Historic Landmarks in Florida
- National Register of Historic Places listings in Florida
