= Sumterville, Florida =

- Unincorporated community
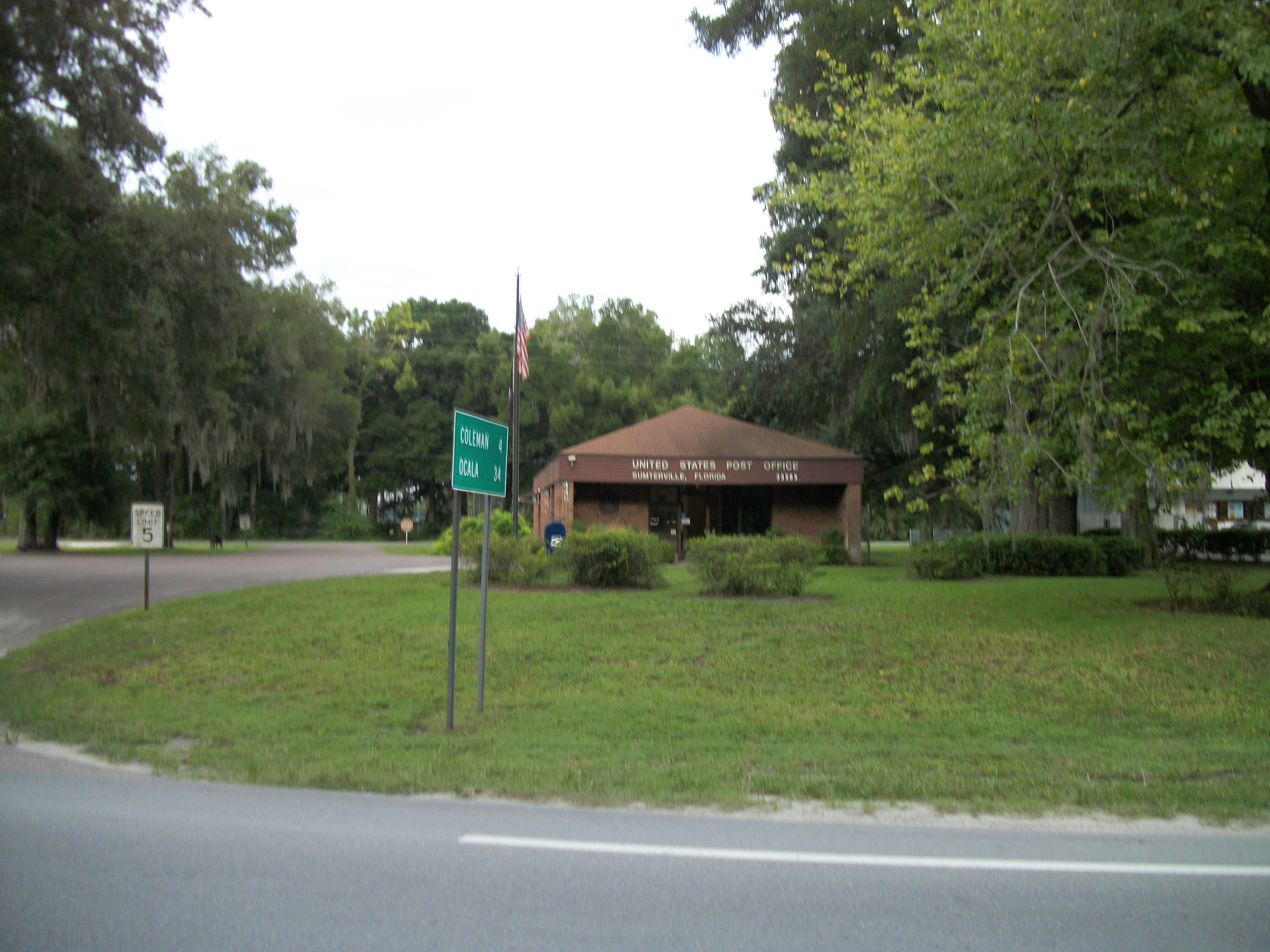
- Sumterville Post Office on US 301.

- Location within Florida
- Coordinates: 28°44′42″N 82°03′48″W
- Country: United States
- State: Florida
- County: Sumter
- Elevation: 75 ft (23 m)
- Time zone: UTC-5 (Eastern (EST))
  - Summer (DST): UTC-4 (EDT)
- ZIP Code: 33585
- Area code: 352
- GNIS feature ID: 291811

Sumterville is an unincorporated community in the U.S. state of Florida within Central Sumter County. Like the county in which it resides, Sumterville was named after General Thomas Sumter, a hero of the American Revolutionary War. The community was an early county seat of Sumter County.

== Geography ==
Sumterville is bordered by the City of Bushnell to the south, the City of Coleman to the north, Lake Panasoffkee to the west, and the Lake County Line to the east. Elevation is 75 feet above sea level. The rural and general atmosphere of Sumterville is similar to that of Coleman and Webster.

== History ==
In 1902, a black man named Henry Wilson was convicted of murdering a sheriff in a trial that lasted just two hours and forty minutes. In response to a white mob demanding his execution date be moved up, officials acquiesced, authorizing Wilson to be hanged.

== Transportation ==
The main roads through Sumterville are US 301 which runs north and south through Sumterville, as does State Road 471, which terminates at US 301. County Road 470 runs east and west, has a short concurrency with US 301, and also acts as the shared northern terminus of SR 471.

Interstate 75 runs along the western edge of Sumterville, as does County Road 475 and the CSX Wildwood Subdivision, which carried Amtrak's Palmetto until 2004. A railroad spur connected to this line ran directly into Sumterville until the 1930s. Exit 321 is I-75's Sumterville/Lake Panasoffkee exit for CR 470, and northbound Exit 321 also leads to CR 475. The right of way for a former Seaboard Coast Line railroad line that carried the Silver Meteor between Coleman and Auburndale also ran through Sumterville until 1988.

== Points of interest ==
Sumterville contains a campus of the Lake–Sumter State College and the Coleman Federal Prison. It is also the home to the Shady Brook Golf and RV Resort, Sumter Electric Co-Op Incorporated. and Collinas de Arena, now a private residence.
