= Murder of Maureen Rowan =

Previously unidentified American female murder victim

Maureen Rowan
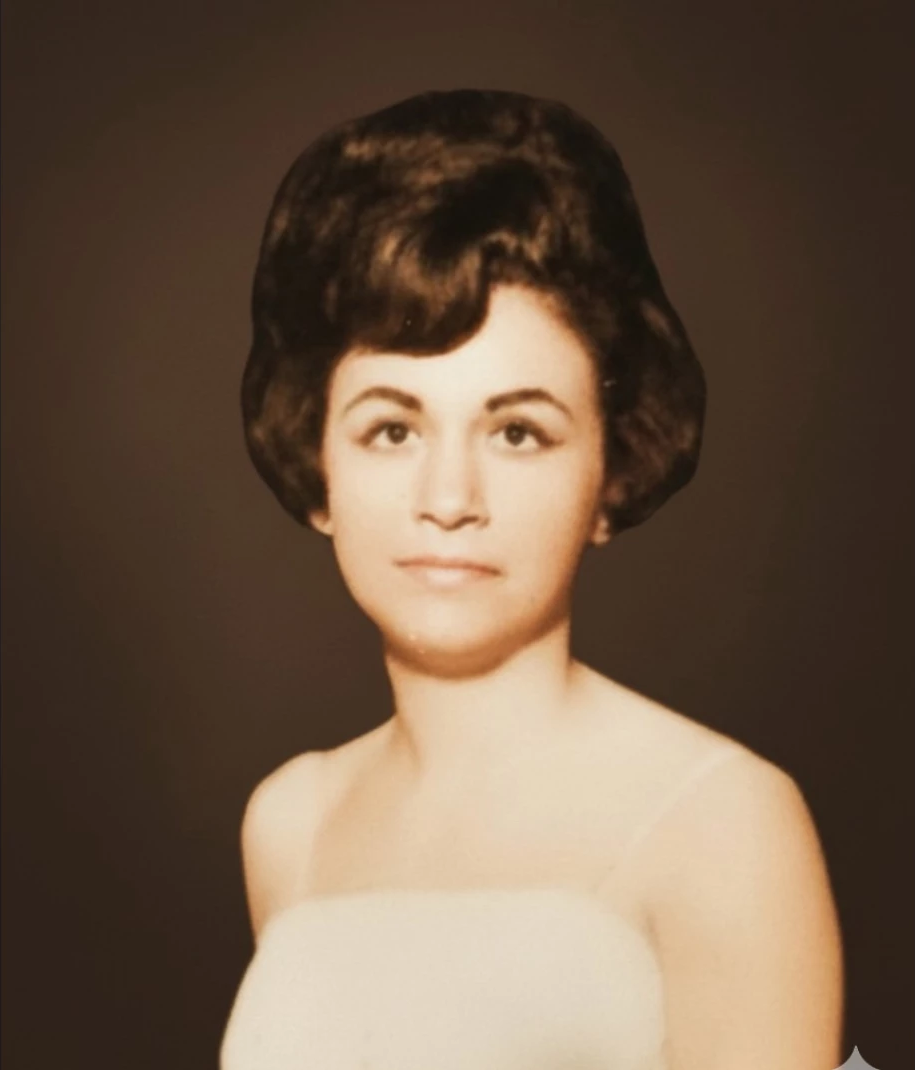
- Wedding photo of Maureen Rowan
- Born: Maureen Lu Minor; March 21, 1949; Maine, U.S.
- Died: c. January 20, 1971 (aged 21); Lake Panasoffkee, Sumter County, Florida, U.S.
- Cause of death: Homicide by ligature strangulation
- Body discovered: February 19, 1971
- Resting place: Oak Grove Cemetery; Wildwood, Florida, U.S.
- Known for: Formerly unidentified victim of homicide
- Height: Between 5 ft 2 in (1.57 m) and 5 ft 5 in (1.65 m)
- Children: 2

Maureen Lu Rowan (née Minor; March 21, 1949 – c. January 20, 1971) was a formerly unidentified murdered young woman found on February 19, 1971, in Lake Panasoffkee, Florida, United States. Before identification, she was known as Little Miss Lake Panasoffkee or Little Miss Panasoffkee. In October 2025, it was announced that Little Miss Panasoffkee was in fact 21-year-old Maine native Rowan, who grew up in Jacksonville, Florida.

Forensic reconstruction of the victim's face was undertaken in 1971 and 2012. The case was featured on the television show Unsolved Mysteries in an episode that premiered on October 14, 1992. In October 2025, the Sumter County Sheriff's Office announced that she had been identified, and had found a person of interest.

== Discovery of the body ==
On February 19, 1971, two teenage hitchhikers discovered a partially submerged figure floating beneath a highway overpass in Lake Panasoffkee, Florida.

The body was dressed in a green shirt, green plaid pants, and a green floral poncho. Also found were a white gold watch and a gold necklace. On her ring finger there was a gold ring with a transparent stone, indicating that she may have been married.

A forensic examination of the remains was conducted by Dr. William Schutze who concluded that the victim had been killed approximately 30 days before her body was discovered. A man's size-36 belt was fastened around her neck, strongly indicating strangulation as the cause of death.

== Forensic examination ==
The body was exhumed in February 1986 for further forensic examination.

The woman was determined to have been between 17 and 24 years old when she died, weighing about 115 pounds. She had brown hair and prominent cheekbones. She was between 5 feet, 2 inches and 5 feet, 5 inches in height. She had received extensive dental work, including numerous silver tooth fillings. She had a porcelain crown on one of her upper right teeth.

It was determined that she had borne at least two children before her death. One of her ribs had been fractured at the time of death, leading investigators to theorize that the killer had possibly knelt on her while he strangled her with the belt.

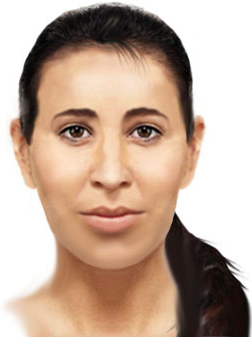
Additional facial reconstruction of the victim

Investigators initially believed the woman to be either of European or Native American ancestry. A further exhumation and examination of the remains, conducted in 2012, established that she was of European descent. An examination of Harris lines in the victim's bones indicated that an illness or malnutrition had briefly arrested her growth in childhood.

Examining the lead isotopes in the victim's teeth, a geological scientist deduced that the victim had undoubtedly spent her childhood and adolescence in southern Europe close to the sea—most likely south of the Greek city of Athens—until within a year of her murder. The geological scientist George Kamenov pinpointed the most likely place as the fishing port of Laurium, Greece.

Given that there is a large Greek-American population in Tarpon Springs (about 117 kilometers [73 mi] from Lake Panasoffkee), and that the victim had been dead for about 30 days and had likely lived in Greece, it was possible to conclude that she had traveled to the United States to attend an Epiphany celebration.

Forensic examination of her hair supported the theory that she had been visiting temporarily. This was indicated by the fact that she had been in Florida for less than two months before her death.

An orthopedic surgery procedure, known as the "Watson-Jones" technique, had been performed on her right ankle when she was about 16 years old. This operation—which involved stretching the tendon by screws drilled into the bone—would most likely have been performed to rectify a chronic instability which would likely have seen the victim sprain her ankle several times before the operation. Periostitis was found in her right leg, which may have been noticeably uncomfortable for the victim.

A further development occurred when the case was featured on a Greek crime show (Fos Sto Tounel). A woman came forward to say that the facial reconstructions may be a girl she knew named Konstantina. She and Konstantina attended a prep school in Greece, where they were trained to be domestic help. After finishing the course, the school sent their students abroad to Australia or the United States as part of a two-year work contract. The school was funded by the International Organization for Migration. This woman had lost contact with Konstantina when they were separated; Konstantina was sent to the United States and the woman was sent to Australia. Konstantina arrived in the United States at the same time as the forensic testing indicated the victim had.

External image
- Scale model of clothing

=== Facial reconstructions ===
A collection of forensic facial reconstructions were made in the 1980s to show what Little Miss Lake Panasoffkee may have looked like at stages of her life. In 2012, another composite was created, visually different from the first. The composite was combined with a scale model of the victim's clothing.

2012 reconstruction by University of South Florida

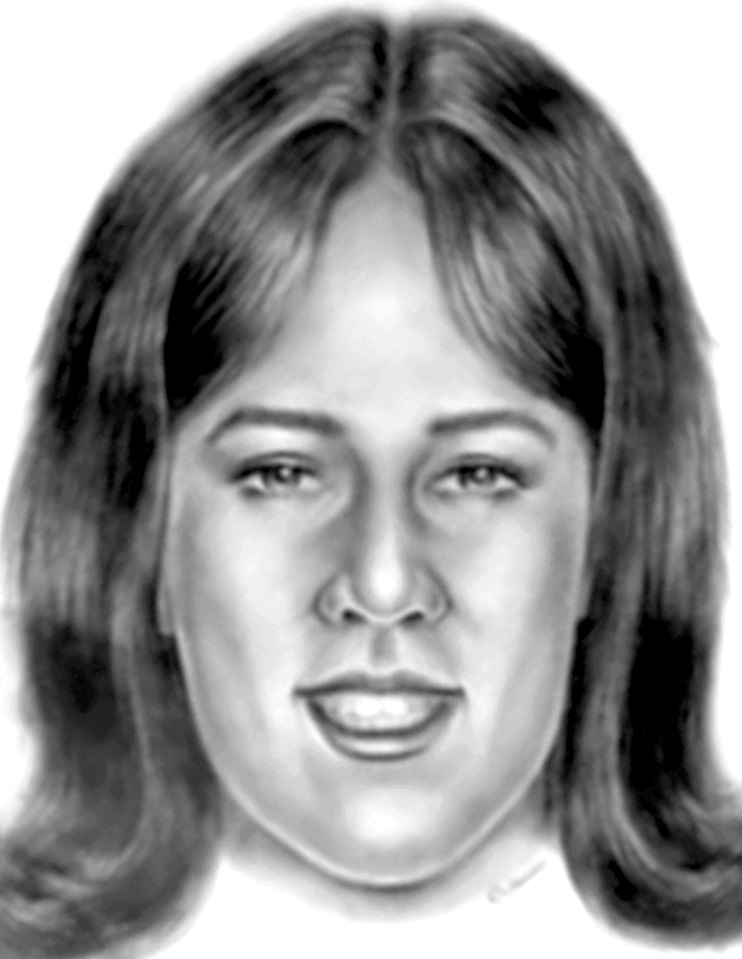
Facial reconstruction by Linda Galeener, circa 1988

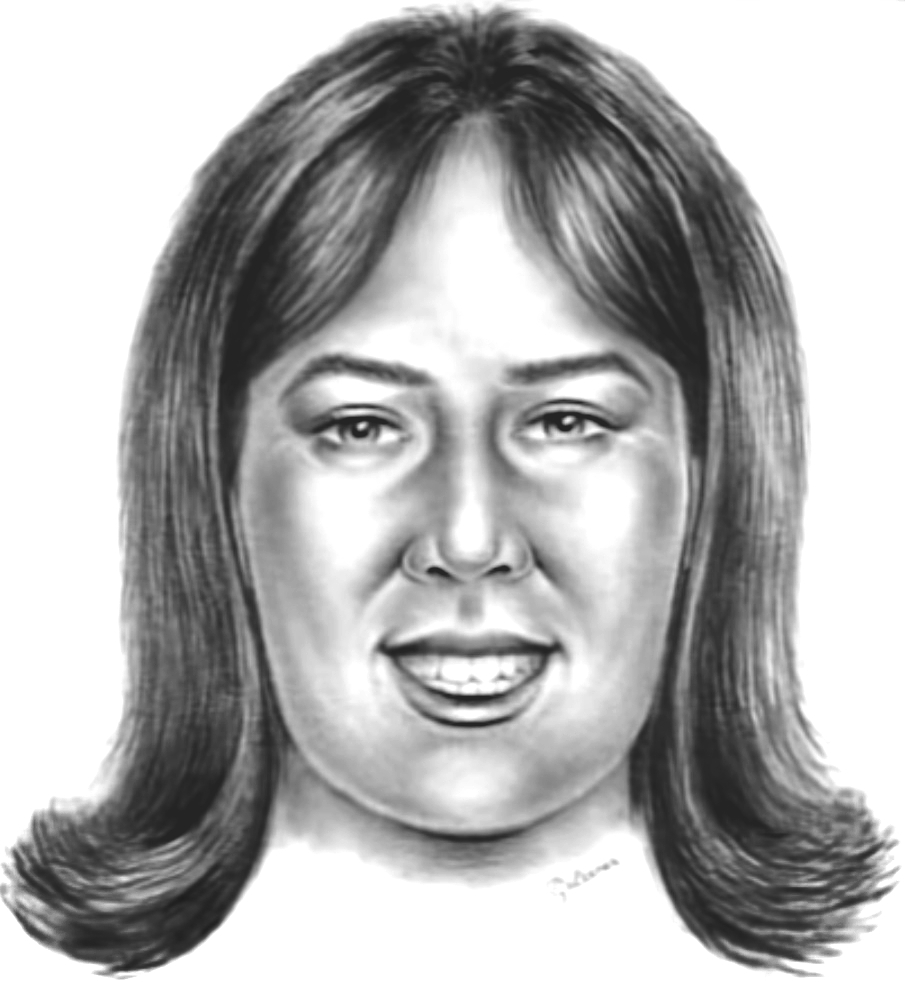
Age regression

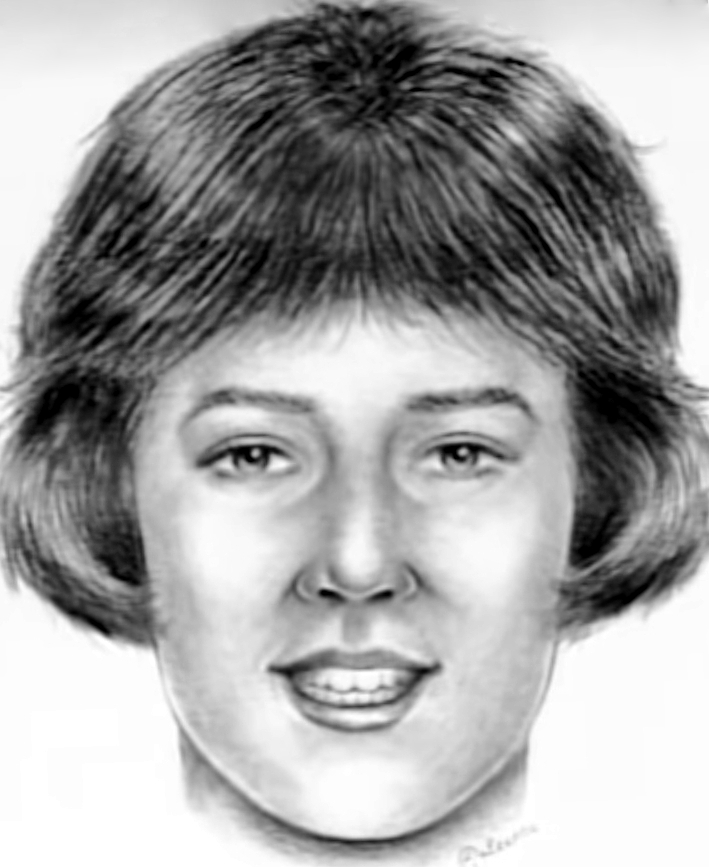
Age regression

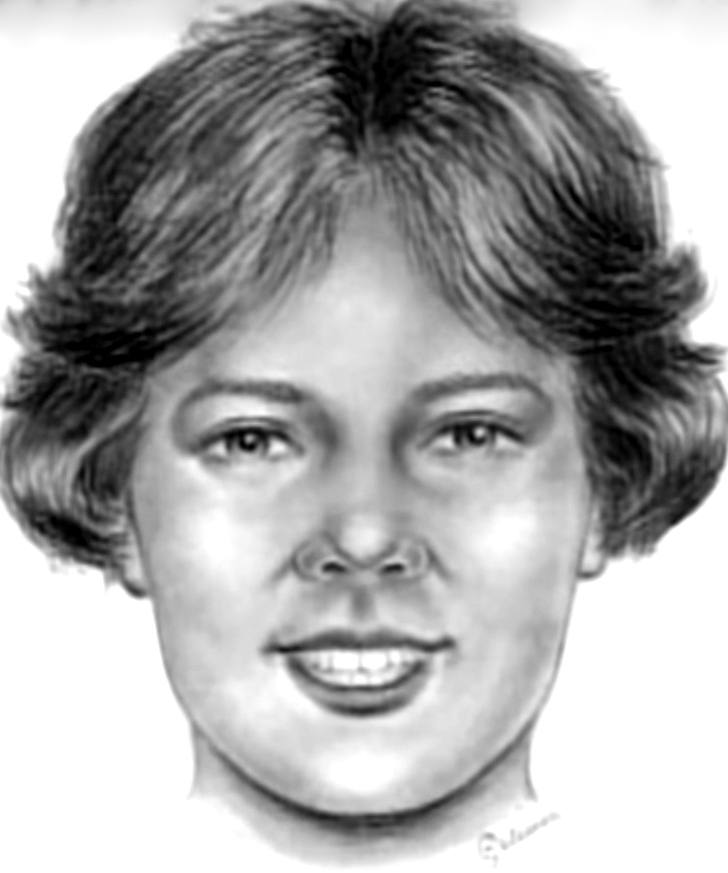
Age regression

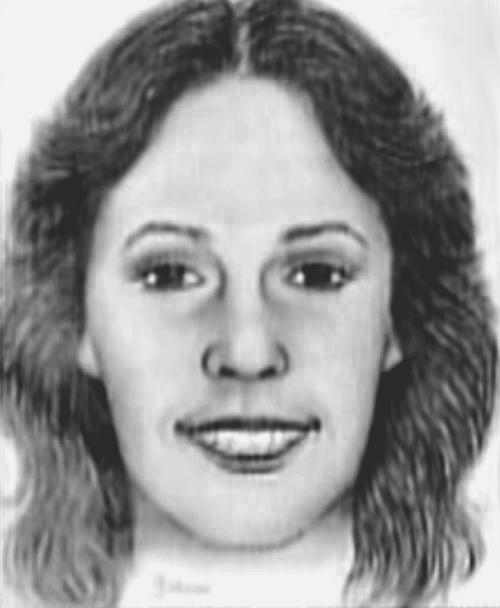
Additional facial reconstruction

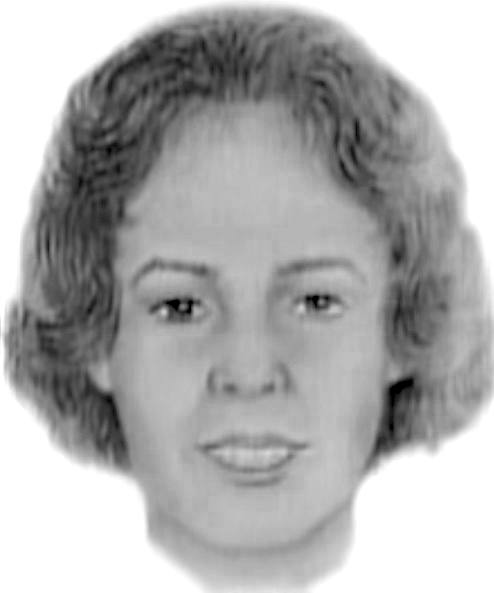
Age regression

Pattern on poncho

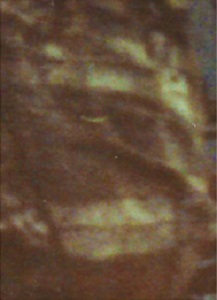
Pattern on pants

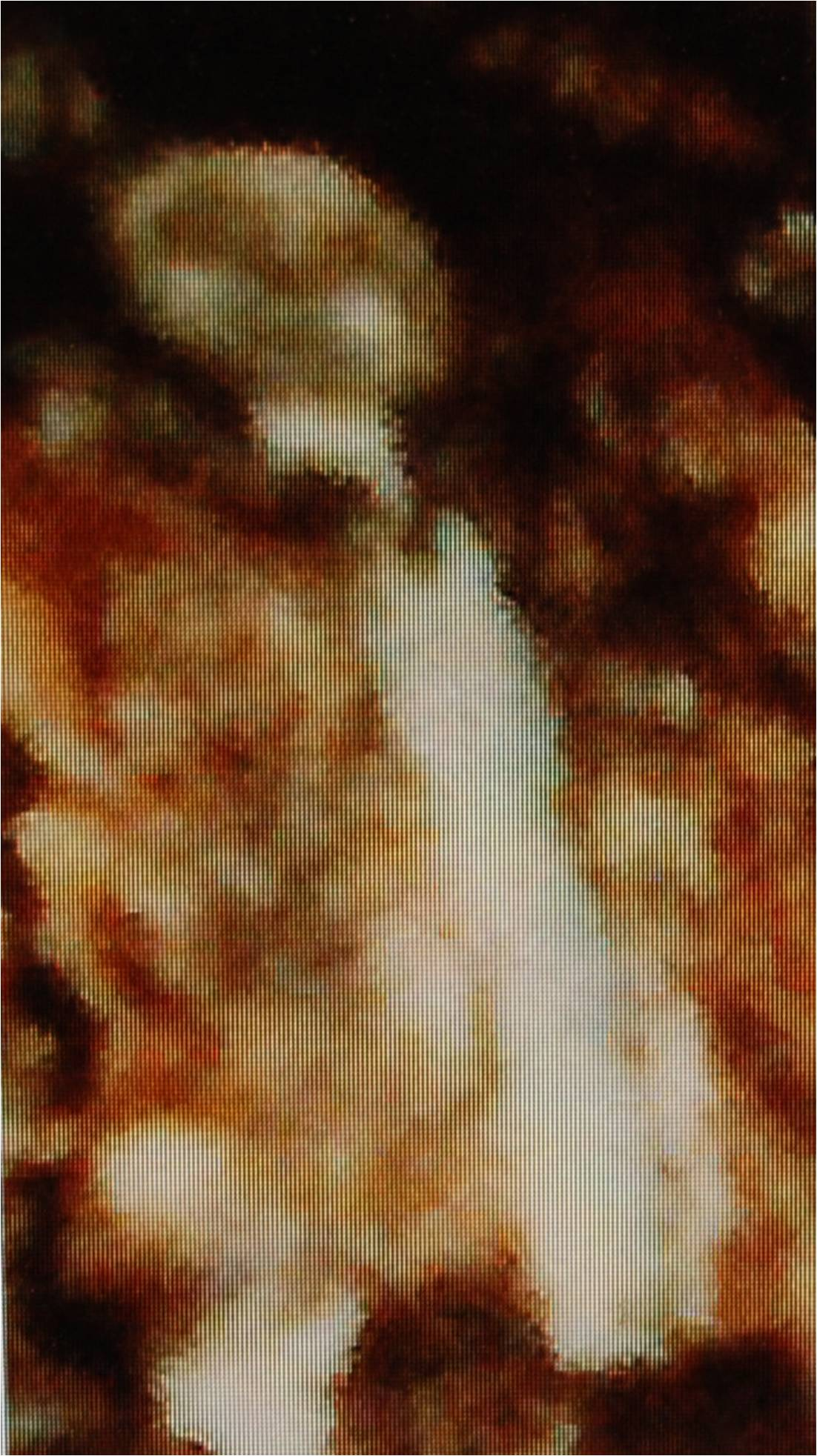
Image of watch

== Identification ==
On October 29, 2025, the Sumter County Sheriff's Office announced that little Miss Panasoffkee had been identified as Maureen Lu Rowan (née Minor), also known as "Cookie", and that a person of interest had been identified. The sheriffs office used fingerprints from the body with updated criminal databases to make a positive ID. The sheriffs office also clarified that the initial assumption of a Greek immigrant was inaccurate because the isotope test performed on the body was contaminated by formaldehyde embalming gel used in the 1970s. The person of interest was her estranged husband, Charles Emery Rowan Sr., who died in 2015. She disappeared when she was 21 after leaving her family for a short time. She was born in 1949 in the state of Maine and had been living in Florida with her family up until her disappearance. She is survived by her two children.

== See also ==
- List of unsolved murders (1900–1979)

== Cited works and further reading ==
- Evans, Colin (1996). The Casebook of Forensic Detection: How Science Solved 100 of the World's Most Baffling Crimes. New York: John Wiley & Sons Inc. ISBN 0-471-07650-3.
- Halber, Deborah (2015). The Skeleton Crew: How Amateur Sleuths Are Solving America's Coldest Cases. New York: Simon & Schuster. ISBN 978-1-451-65758-6.
- Innes, Brian (2000). Bodies of Evidence: The Fascinating World of Forensic Science and How it Helped Solve More than 100 True Crimes. Leicester: Amber Books Ltd. ISBN 1-856-05623-6.
- Latham, Krista E.; Bartelink, Eric J.; Finnegan, Michael (2017). New Perspectives in Forensic Human Skeletal Identification. San Diego: Academic Press. ISBN 978-0-128-05429-1.
- Murray, Elizabeth A. (2012). Forensic Identification: Putting a Name and Face on Death. Minneapolis: Twenty-First Century Books. ISBN 978-1-467-70139-6.
- Newton, Michael (2004). The Encyclopedia of Unsolved Crimes. New York: Facts on File. ISBN 978-0-816-07818-9.
- Pettem, Silvia (2009). Someone's Daughter: In Search of Justice for Jane Doe. Plymouth: Taylor Trade Publishing. ISBN 978-1-589-79420-7.
- Pettem, Silvia (2017). The Long Term Missing: Hope and Help for Families. Maryland: Rowman & Littlefield. ISBN 978-1-442-25680-4.
- Ubelaker, Douglas H.; Scamell, Henry (1992). Bones: A Forensic Detective's Casebook. New York: M. Evans and Company Inc. ISBN 978-1-283-61515-0.
- Taylor, Karen T. (2000). Forensic Art and Illustration. New York: CRC Press. ISBN 978-0-849-38118-8.
