= Florida State Road 471 =

State highway in Florida, United States

State Road 471

Route information
- Maintained by FDOT
- Length: 34.909 mi (56.181 km)

Major junctions
- South end: US 98 near Branchborough
- SR 50 at Tarrytown
- North end: US 301 / CR 470 near Sumterville

Location
- Country: United States
- State: Florida
- Counties: Polk, Pasco, Sumter

Highway system
- Florida State Highway System; Interstate; US; State; Former; Pre‑1945; Toll; Scenic
← SR 464	→ SR 472

State Road 471 (SR 471) is a two-lane rural highway primarily in Sumter County in the state of Florida. It runs north and south from U.S. Route 98 (US 98) in northwestern Polk County to US 301 near Sumterville in Sumter County.

== Route description ==
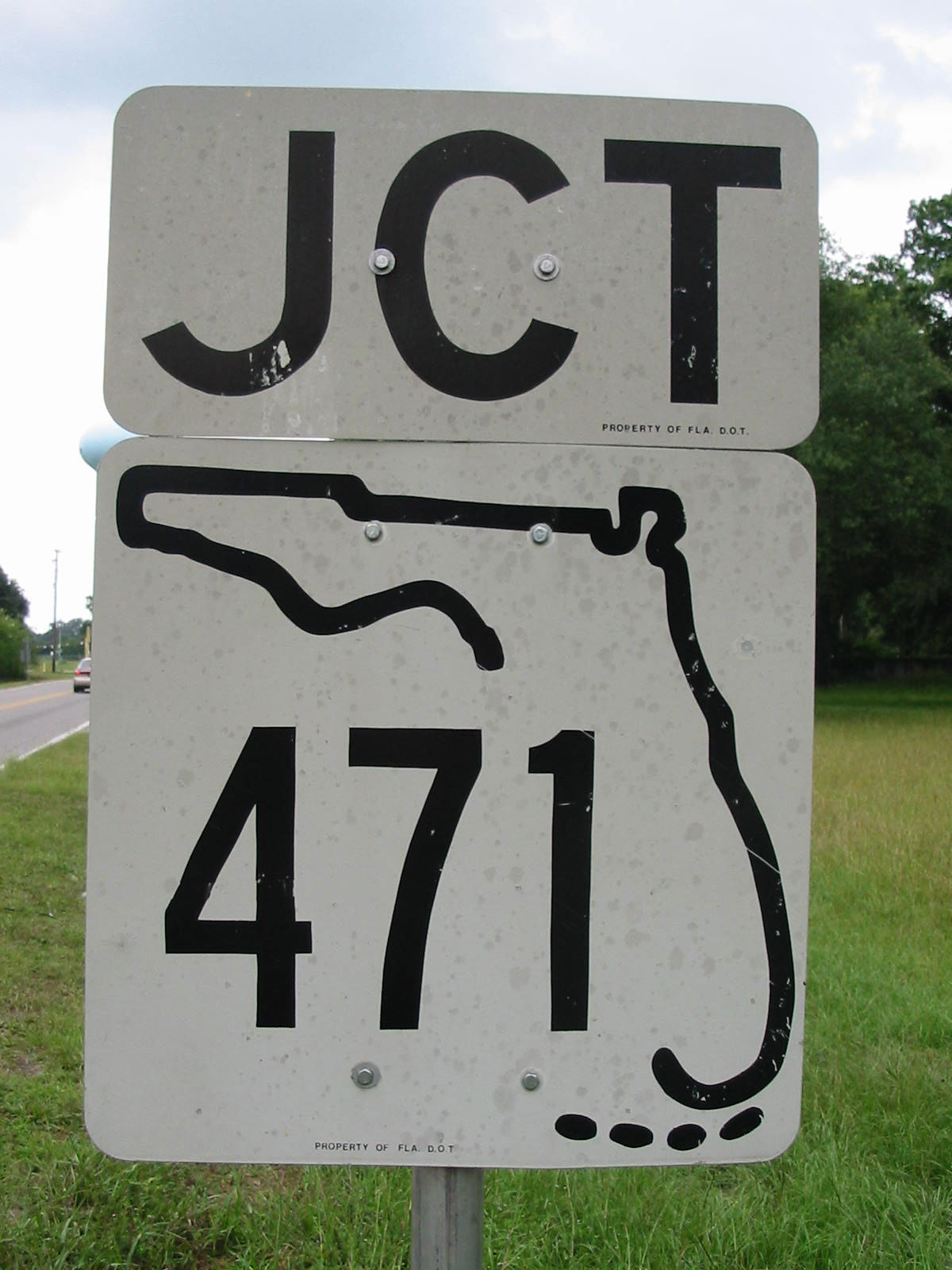
Old-style shield at a road that crosses SR 471 in Webster

State Road 471 begins at US 98 in northwestern Polk County, which is just southeast of Branchborough in Pasco County and the eastern terminus of County Road 54, a county extension of SR 54. The road soon leaves Polk County and runs along the Pasco-Polk County Line. Here the road runs entirely through preserved forest land and swampland, including the Green Swamp. Contrary to what many maps indicate it is not as straight through this area shifting from left to right and vice versa on a random basis. Crossing the Withlacoochee River, the Pasco-Polk border is replaced by the Pasco-Sumter border, and the landscape described earlier continues. Eventually it enters part of the Withlacoochee State Forest, and some distance later, the Pasco-Sumter Line is replaced by the Hernando-Sumter Line. After leaving the forest the road crosses over the Little Withlacoochee River where the Hernando-Sumter border turns west, and SR 471 is now entirely in Sumter County. Eventually, the road slows down into Tarrytown, Florida where it approaches a lumber mill, and crosses the former right-of-way for the Orange Belt Railway just south of the intersection of State Road 50.

North of Tarrytown, SR 471 becomes as straight as road maps incorrectly indicate it to be south of Tarrytown. Most of this segment of the road runs primarily through farmland interrupted only by the occasional rural road, and county road without shields. However the amount of farmland is reduced, but not eliminated, once it runs through the City of Webster, a popular farm-to-market trading post. Within Webster, SR 471 serves as a terminus of County Road 478A and 4/10 of a mile later intersects County Road 478, which spans from US 301 in the St. Catherine/Croom-A-Coochie area to Center Hill. SR 471 shares a 3/10 mile concurrency with CR 478 between Southeast First Street and Northwest Fourth Street. Outside of the Webster city limits, farmland becomes more prominent again, and the road becomes part of an unincorporated community named Belville's Corner, which is also the intersection with County Road 48, a tri-county extension of State Road 48. North of Belville's Corner, the road intersects the eastern terminus of County Road 476 and western terminus of County Road 567. Near Sumterville, SR 471 shifts slightly to the northwest and runs in close proximity to a former Seaboard Air Line Railroad line that ran towards Winter Haven, and carried Amtrak trains until 1988. Two county roads of minor significance include County Road 528 and later 526, both of which lead to a campus of the Lake-Sumter Community College. Like those two streets, SR 471 terminates at US 301. However, unlike these two the segment of US 301 is also shared with County Road 470.

== Major intersections ==
County	Location	mi	km	Destinations	Notes
Polk		0.000	0.000	US 98 (SR 35 / SR 700) – Lakeland, Dade City	Southern terminus
Sumter	Tarrytown	21.157	34.049	SR 50 – Brooksville, Groveland	
Sumter	Webster	24.435	39.324	CR 478A south	
Sumter	Webster	24.850	39.992	CR 478 east (Southeast First Avenue)	South end of CR 478 overlap
Sumter	Webster	25.197	40.551	CR 478 west (Northwest Fourth Avenue)	North end of CR 478 overlap
Sumter	Bevilles Corner	27.715	44.603	CR 48 – Bushnell, Center Hill	
Sumter		28.722	46.224	CR 476 west / CR 567 east	
Sumter		34.909	56.181	US 301 (SR 35) / CR 470 – Coleman, Bushnell	Northern terminus
1.000 mi = 1.609 km; 1.000 km = 0.621 mi: Concurrency terminus
