= Wild Cow Prairie Cemetery =

Historic site in Sumter County, Florida

- U.S. National Register of Historic Places
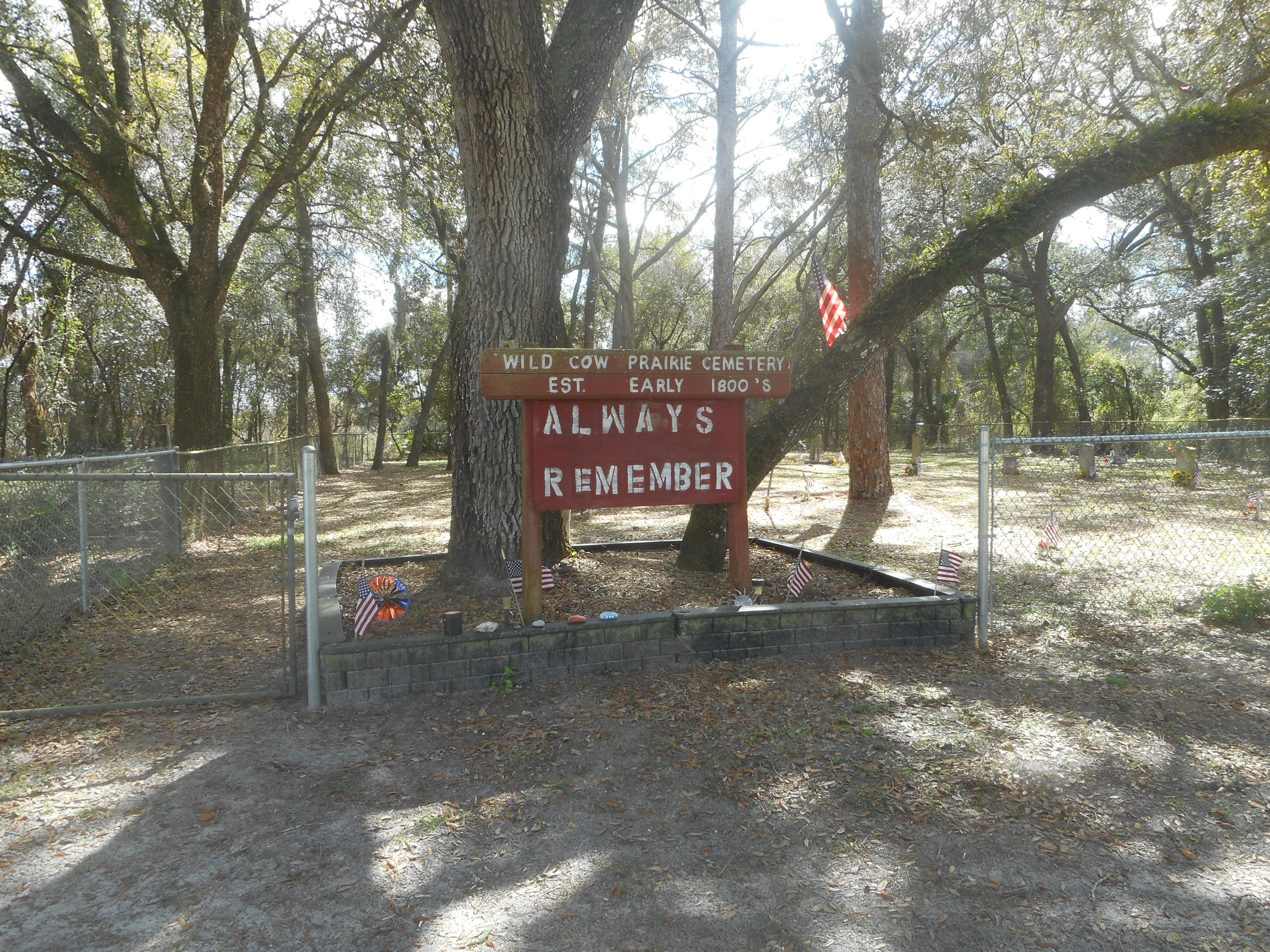
- Sign for the cemetery as seen in February 2021

- Location within Florida Location within the United States
- Location: 5822 County Rd. 673, vicinity of Bushnell, Sumter County, Florida
- Coordinates: 28°36′08″N 82°12′08″W
- Area: 1 acre (0.40 ha)
- NRHP reference No.: 100006119
- Added to NRHP: February 2, 2021

The Wild Cow Prairie Cemetery is located in Sumter County, Florida near Bushnell, Florida. It was listed on the National Register of Historic Places in 2021.

A 2020 study using ground-penetrating radar determined presence of 16 marked and 28 unmarked graves. It includes burials of veterans, of county commissioners and possibly of former slaves.

While its address is 5822 County Road 673, it is located along the partially paved frontage road on the southeast side of the embankment for CR 673 and Exit 309 off of Interstate 75, within part of the Withlacoochee State Forest in Saint Catherine, Florida.
