= Croom-A-Coochee, Florida =

Unincorporated community in Florida, US

Coordinates: 28.612°N 82.138°W

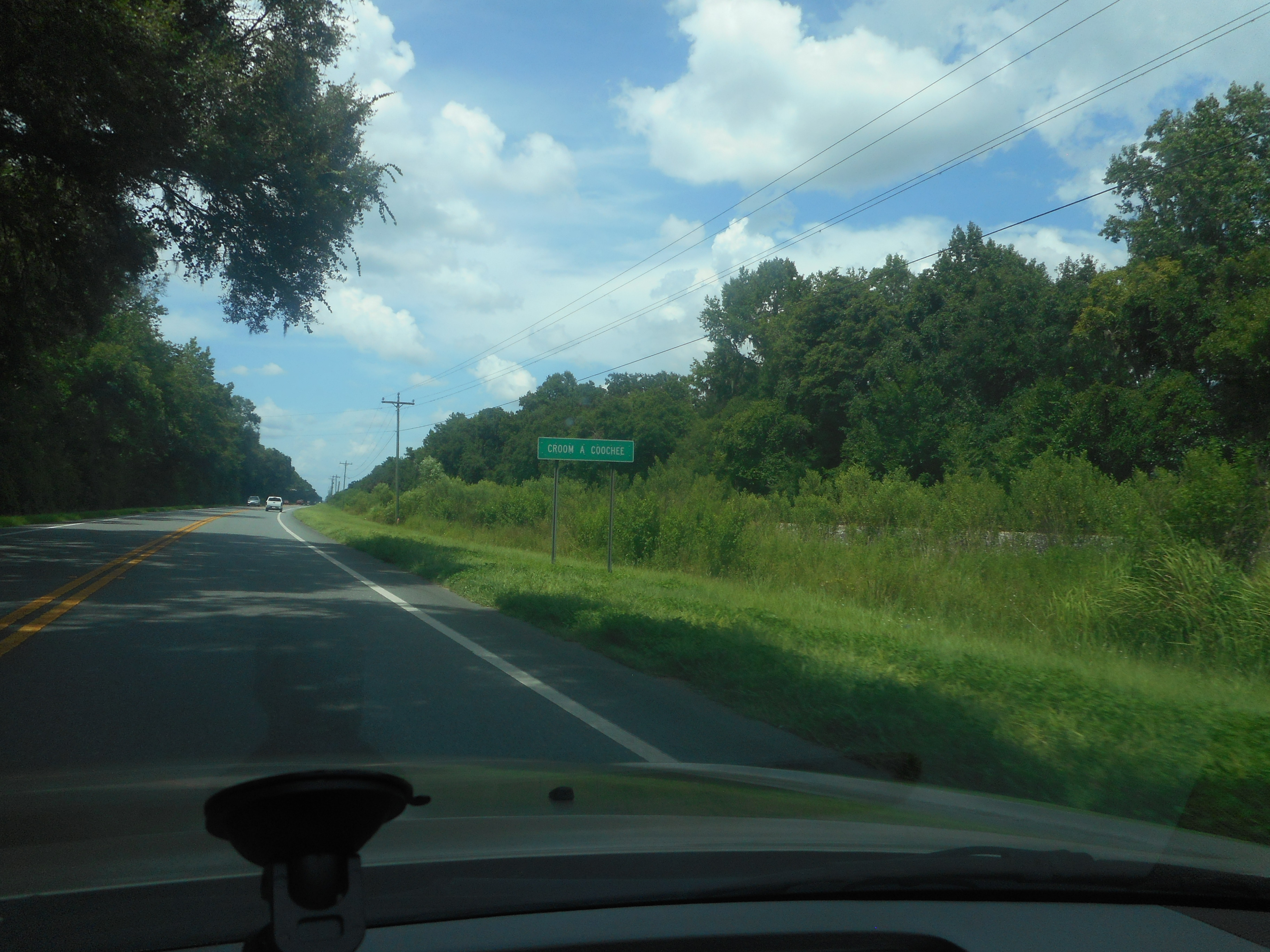
Northbound US 301 as it enters Croom-A-Coochee, Florida.

Croom-A-Coochee is an unincorporated community in Sumter County, Florida, United States, located adjacent to the Croom Wildlife Management Area (WMA) near the Withlacoochee River. The official zip code is 33597, which is shared with Webster. In addition to the Croom WMA, Sumter County offers hunting in the Green Swamp, Richloam, and Half Moon Wildlife Management Area. A new area has opened at the northeast end of Lake Panasoffkee.

== See also ==
- Croom, Florida
