= 1896 United States presidential election in Florida =

- November 3, 1896

Nominee	William Jennings Bryan	William McKinley
Party	Democratic	Republican
Alliance	Populist
Home state	Nebraska	Ohio
Running mate	Arthur Sewall	Garret Hobart
Electoral vote	4	0
Popular vote	32,756	11,298
Percentage	70.46%	24.30%
County results
Bryan
40–50%
50–60%
60–70%
70–80%
80–90%
90–100%
President before election
Grover Cleveland
Democratic
Elected President
William McKinley
Republican

The 1896 United States presidential election in Florida took place on November 3, 1896. All contemporary 45 states were part of the 1896 United States presidential election. Florida voters chose four electors to the Electoral College, which selected the president and vice president.

Florida was won by the Democratic nominees, former U.S. Representative William Jennings Bryan of Nebraska and his running mate Arthur Sewall of Maine. They defeated the Republican nominees, former Governor of Ohio William McKinley and his running mate Garret Hobart of New Jersey. Bryan won the state by a landslide margin of 46.16%.

Bryan would later win Florida against McKinley again four years later and would later win it again in 1908 against William Howard Taft.

== Results ==
1896 United States presidential election in Florida
Party	Candidate	Votes	Percentage	Electoral votes
Democratic	William Jennings Bryan	30,779	66.21%	4
Populist	William Jennings Bryan	1,977	4.25%	0
Total	William Jennings Bryan	32,756	70.46%	4
Republican	William McKinley	11,298	24.30%	0
National Democratic	John M. Palmer	1,778	3.82%	0
Prohibition	Joshua Levering	656	1.41%	0
Totals		46,488	100.00%	4
Voter turnout				—

=== Results by county ===
County	William Jennings Bryan Democratic/Populist		William McKinley Republican		John McAuley Palmer National Democratic		Joshua Levering Prohibition		Margin		Total votes cast
County	#	%	#	%	#	%	#	%	#	%	Total votes cast
Alachua	1,545	68.82%	645	28.73%	44	1.96%	11	0.49%	900	40.09%	2,245
Baker	247	83.45%	33	11.15%	2	0.68%	14	4.73%	214	72.30%	296
Bradford	836	77.34%	176	16.28%	53	4.90%	16	1.48%	660	61.05%	1,081
Brevard	505	55.99%	337	37.36%	43	4.77%	17	1.88%	168	18.63%	902
Calhoun	205	71.68%	52	18.18%	26	9.09%	3	1.05%	153	53.50%	286
Citrus	347	84.63%	35	8.54%	12	2.93%	16	3.90%	312	76.10%	410
Clay	355	58.10%	230	37.64%	20	3.27%	6	0.98%	125	20.46%	611
Columbia	768	73.70%	228	21.88%	30	2.88%	16	1.54%	540	51.82%	1,042
Dade	372	46.97%	368	46.46%	38	4.80%	14	1.77%	4	0.51%	792
De Soto	700	74.39%	198	21.04%	24	2.55%	19	2.02%	502	53.35%	941
Duval	1,903	51.52%	1,462	39.58%	313	8.47%	16	0.43%	441	11.94%	3,694
Escambia	1,285	77.04%	233	13.97%	138	8.27%	12	0.72%	1,052	63.07%	1,668
Franklin	294	64.47%	146	32.02%	13	2.85%	3	0.66%	148	32.46%	456
Gadsden	597	85.78%	66	9.48%	24	3.45%	9	1.29%	531	76.29%	696
Hamilton	533	81.25%	74	11.28%	18	2.74%	31	4.73%	459	69.97%	656
Hernando	231	83.09%	37	13.31%	6	2.16%	4	1.44%	194	69.78%	278
Hillsborough	2,180	75.20%	584	20.14%	87	3.00%	48	1.66%	1,596	55.05%	2,899
Holmes	396	83.54%	51	10.76%	19	4.01%	8	1.69%	345	72.78%	474
Jackson	1,285	79.62%	285	17.66%	33	2.04%	11	0.68%	1,000	61.96%	1,614
Jefferson	1,909	87.29%	242	11.07%	18	0.82%	18	0.82%	1,667	76.22%	2,187
Lafayette	357	92.49%	13	3.37%	4	1.04%	12	3.11%	344	89.12%	386
Lake	870	70.16%	302	24.35%	54	4.35%	14	1.13%	568	45.81%	1,240
Lee	222	71.15%	74	23.72%	15	4.81%	1	0.32%	148	47.44%	312
Leon	1,298	81.53%	247	15.52%	26	1.63%	21	1.32%	1,051	66.02%	1,592
Levy	483	77.16%	113	18.05%	20	3.19%	10	1.60%	370	59.11%	626
Liberty	115	61.50%	42	22.46%	27	14.44%	3	1.60%	73	39.04%	187
Madison	885	83.02%	144	13.51%	25	2.35%	12	1.13%	741	69.51%	1,066
Manatee	480	75.59%	135	21.26%	11	1.73%	9	1.42%	345	54.33%	635
Marion	1,230	65.74%	480	25.65%	129	6.89%	32	1.71%	750	40.09%	1,871
Monroe	452	49.89%	369	40.73%	59	6.51%	26	2.87%	83	9.16%	906
Nassau	572	59.83%	310	32.43%	60	6.28%	14	1.46%	262	27.41%	956
Orange	1,086	62.41%	565	32.47%	74	4.25%	15	0.86%	521	29.94%	1,740
Osceola	274	66.83%	118	28.78%	4	0.98%	14	3.41%	156	38.05%	410
Pasco	482	85.77%	70	12.46%	6	1.07%	4	0.71%	412	73.31%	562
Polk	1,155	76.24%	279	18.42%	64	4.22%	17	1.12%	876	57.82%	1,515
Putnam	990	52.27%	816	43.08%	52	2.75%	36	1.90%	174	9.19%	1,894
St. John's	561	86.44%	50	7.70%	13	2.00%	25	3.85%	511	78.74%	649
Santa Rosa	694	59.06%	431	36.68%	25	2.13%	25	2.13%	263	22.38%	1,175
Sumter	524	80.74%	89	13.71%	28	4.31%	8	1.23%	435	67.03%	649
Suwannee	905	79.39%	196	17.19%	29	2.54%	10	0.88%	709	62.19%	1,140
Taylor	255	86.73%	31	10.54%	6	2.04%	2	0.68%	224	76.19%	294
Volusia	753	51.36%	635	43.32%	42	2.86%	36	2.46%	118	8.05%	1,466
Wakulla	670	94.77%	35	4.95%	0	0.00%	2	0.28%	635	89.82%	707
Walton	594	80.16%	129	17.41%	11	1.48%	7	0.94%	465	62.75%	741
Washington	356	65.80%	143	26.43%	33	6.10%	9	1.66%	213	39.37%	541
Totals	32,756	70.46%	11,298	24.30%	1,778	3.82%	656	1.41%	21,458	46.16%	46,488

== See also ==
- United States presidential elections in Florida
