= St. Catherine, Florida =

Unincorporated community in Florida, U.S.

Coordinates: 28°36′37″N 82°08′17″W

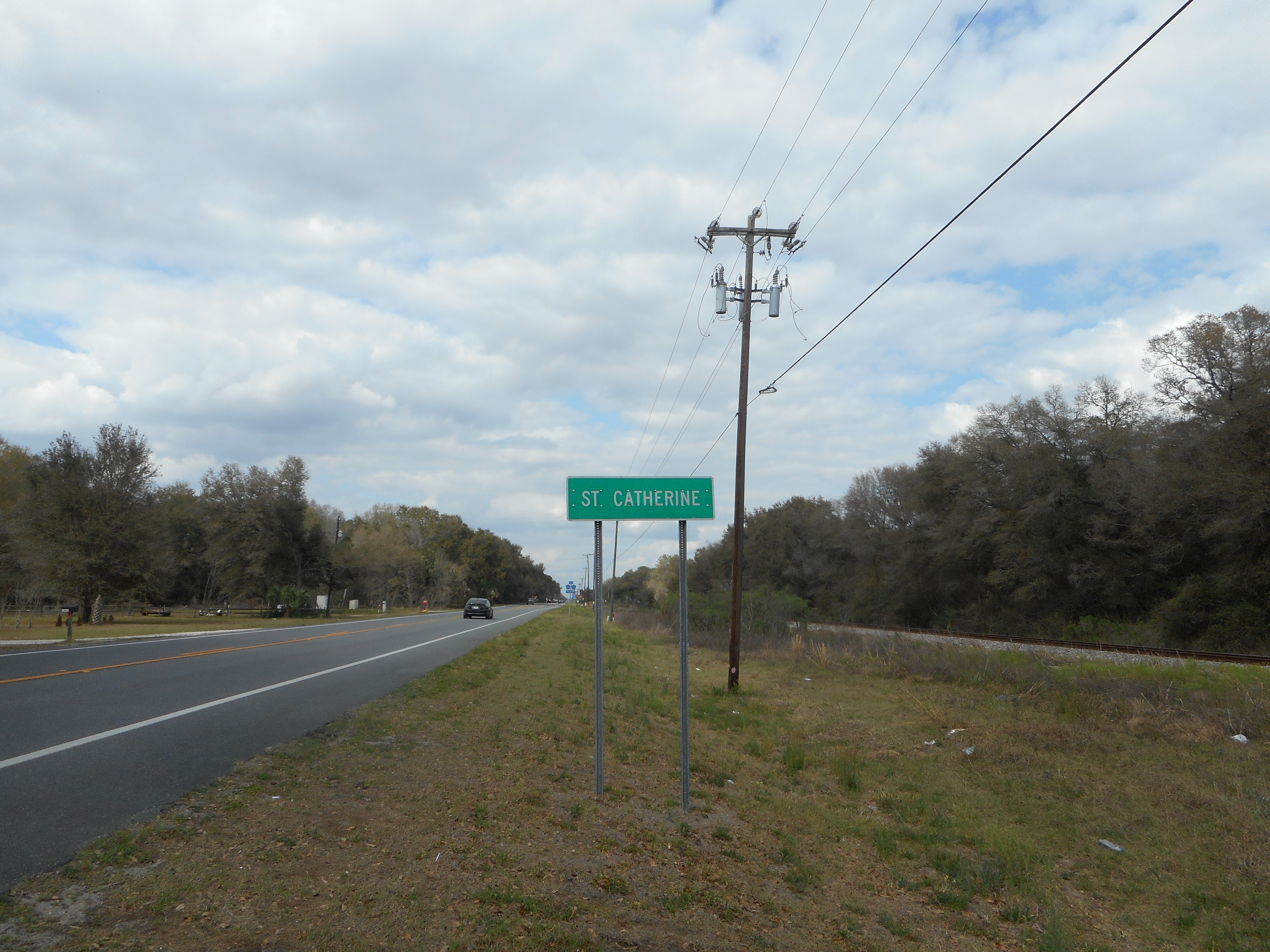
Northbound US 301 as it enters Saint Catherine, Florida

St. Catherine or Saint Catherine is an unincorporated community in western Sumter County, Florida, United States. The ZIP code for this community is 33597, which is shared by Webster to the northeast.

== Geography ==
St. Catherine is bordered by Bushnell to the north, Redrell to the south, Oak Grove and Tarrytown to the east, and the Sumter-Hernando County Line to the west. The elevation of the community is 69 feet above sea level. It is located along U.S. 301 and CSX Transportation's S Line. The two main intersections are with County Road 673 and County Road 478. At one time an Atlantic Coast Line Railroad line (built by the Florida Southern Railway) spanning from Brooksville through Webster and Center Hill crossed the tracks.
