= Linden, Florida =

- Unincorporated community
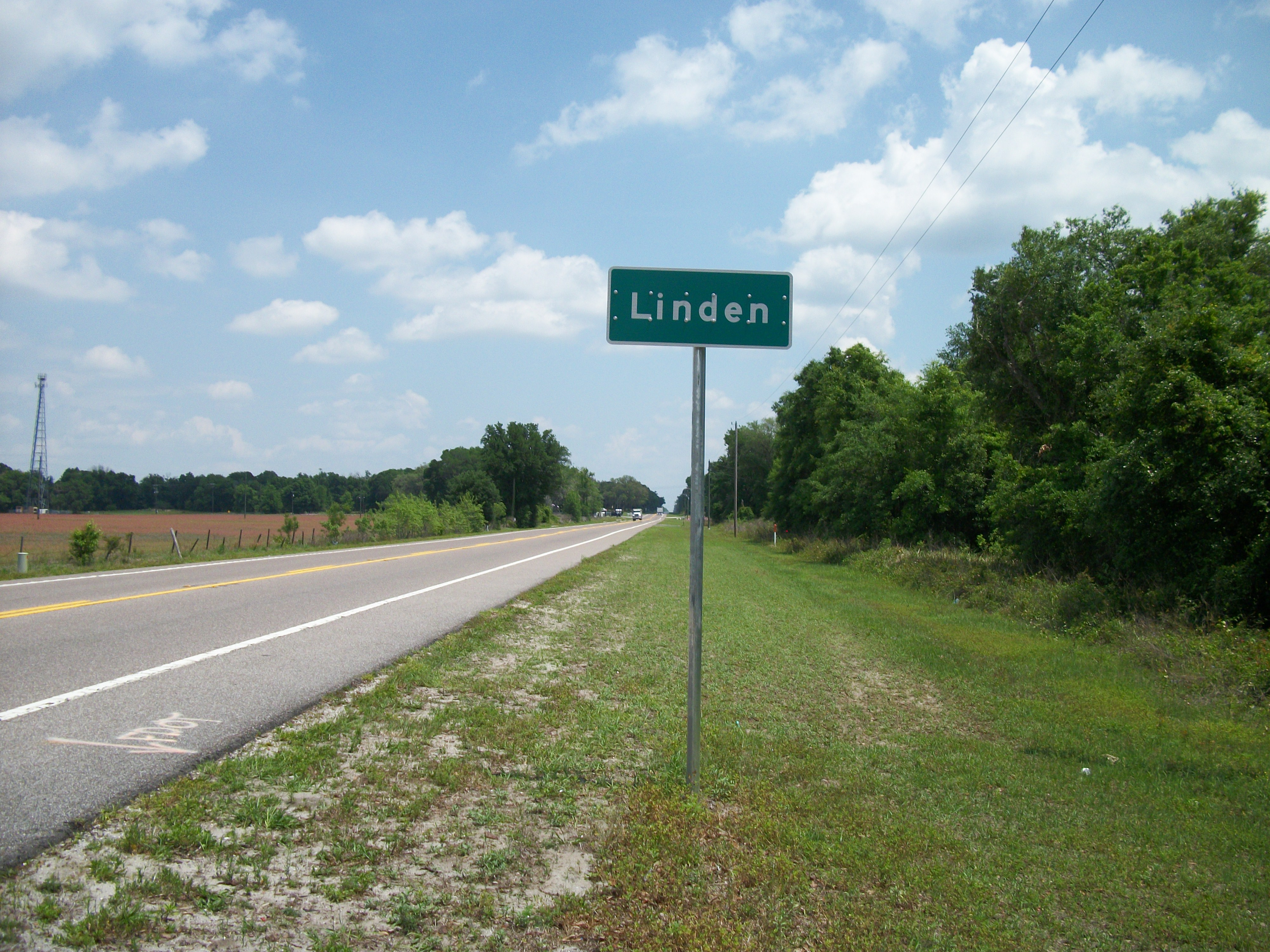
- Eastbound SR 50 as it enters Linden, Florida.

- Location within Florida
- Coordinates: 28°33′43″N 82°02′02″W
- Country: United States
- State: Florida
- County: Sumter
- Elevation: 92 ft (28 m)
- Time zone: UTC-5 (Eastern (EST))
  - Summer (DST): UTC-4 (EDT)
- ZIP code: 33597
- Area code: 352
- GNIS feature ID: 295408

Linden is an unincorporated community in central Sumter County, Florida, United States. The zip code is 33597, which is shared with Webster to the north.

== Geography ==
Linden is bordered by the Withlacoochee State Forest to the south, Tarrytown to the west, Webster and Center Hill to the north, and Mabel to the east.

== Transportation and Economy ==
The main road through Linden is State Road 50. The abandoned Orange Belt Railway line spanning from Trilby in Pasco County to Sylvan Lake in Seminole County runs parallel to SR 50 throughout the community. Pavement markings approaching this line still exist on County Road 772.

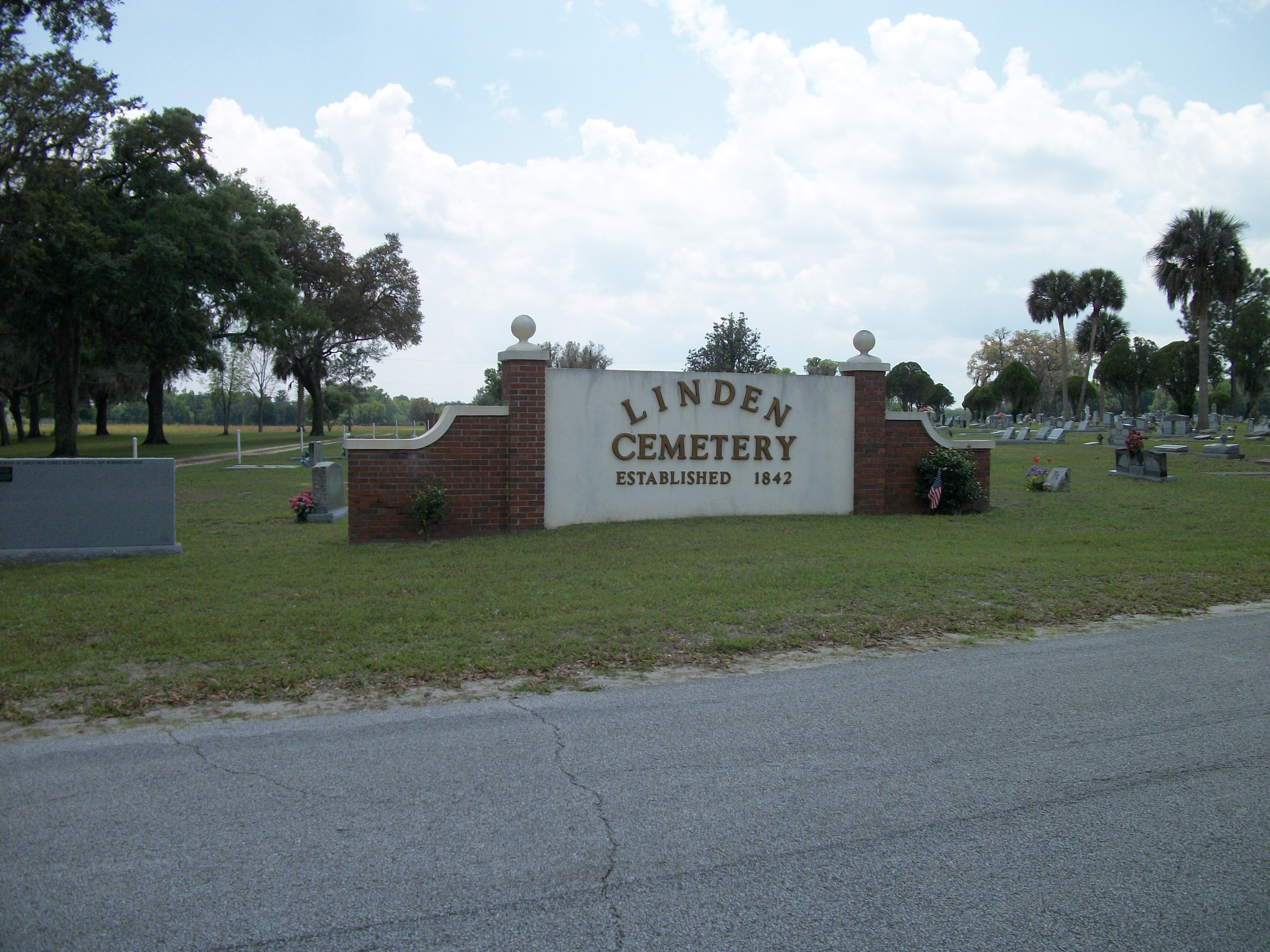
Linden Cemetery.

The primary industry within Linden is farming. The only other businesses include a single store operating from a former gas station, an aggregate mine close to Mabel, three churches, and a cemetery dating back to 1842.

== History ==
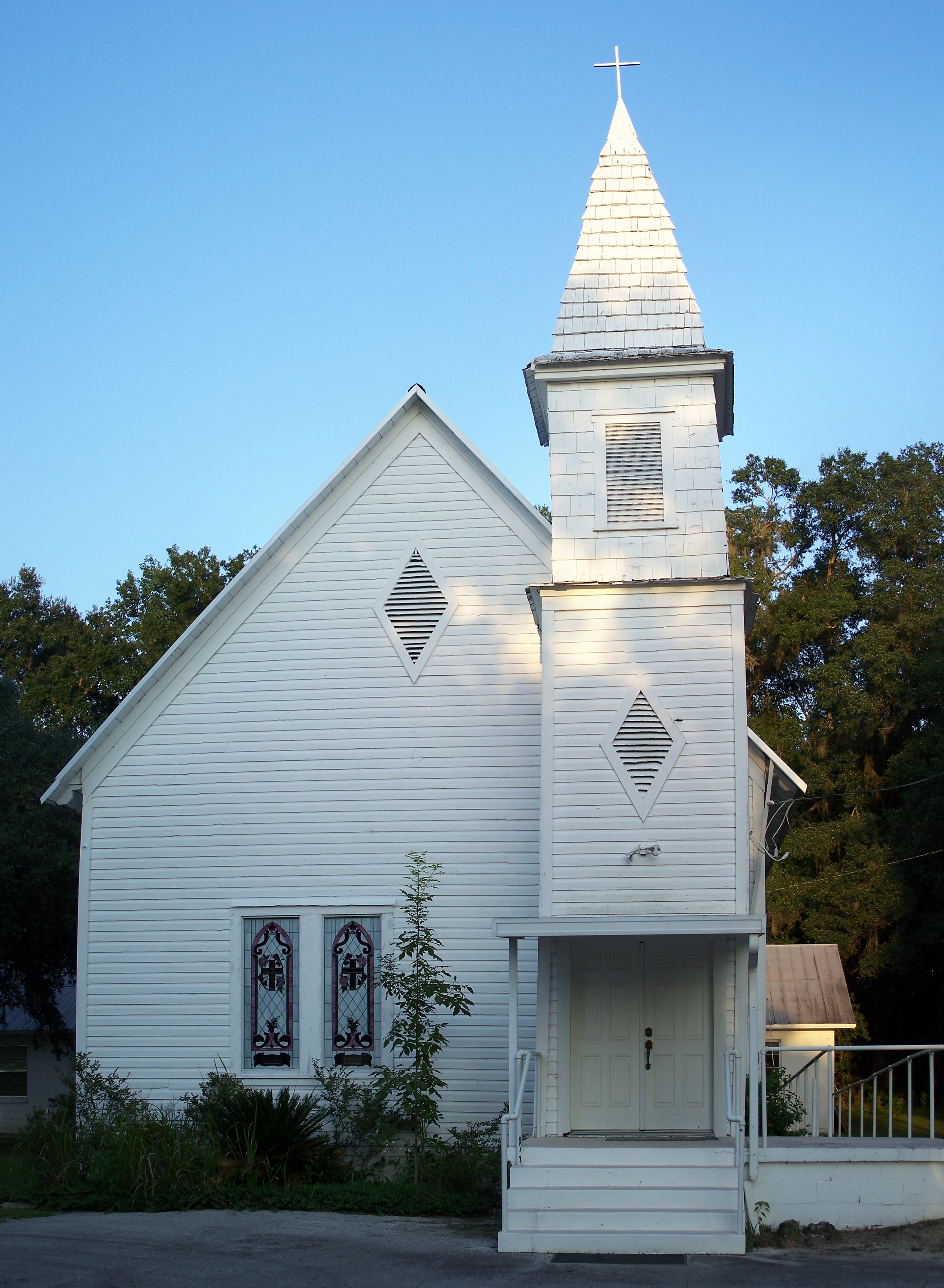
The historic United Methodist Church in Linden

Linden has a very rich history, dating back to the mid-19th century. Linden was all owned by a family of farmers named Morgan. It went on that way for twenty years until John Morgan sold a large portion of land to unknown buyers. Over 230 acres (0.93 km^{2}) are still owned by the Morgans. It is the largest land ownership in Linden. Four original Morgans live on the 230 acres (0.93 km^{2}) that make up that homestead.
