= Tarrytown, Florida =

- Unincorporated community
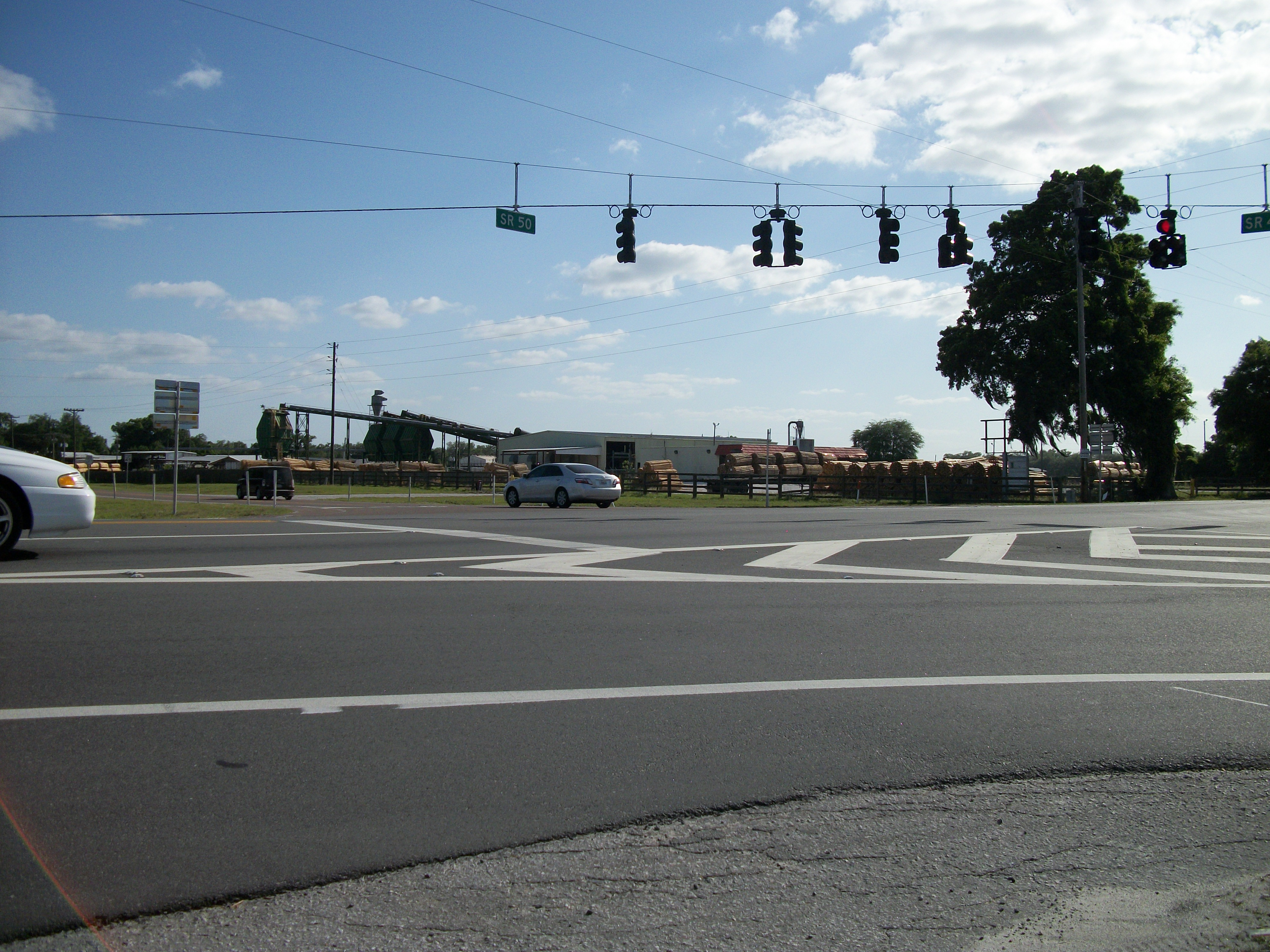
- The intersection of State Roads 50 and 471 in the shadow of a saw mill in Tarrytown, Florida.

- Location within Florida
- Coordinates: 28°33′18″N 82°03′16″W
- Country: United States
- State: Florida
- County: Sumter
- Elevation: 89 ft (27 m)
- Time zone: UTC-5 (Eastern (EST))
  - Summer (DST): UTC-4 (EDT)
- ZIP code: 33597
- Area code: 352
- GNIS feature ID: 292050

Tarrytown is an unincorporated community in central Sumter County, Florida, United States. The ZIP Code for this community is 33597, which is shared by Webster, four miles to the north.

== Geography ==
Tarrytown is bordered by the Withlacoochee State Forest to the south, St. Catherine to the west, Webster to the north, and Linden to the east.

== Transportation and economy ==
The main roads through Tarrytown are State Road 50 and State Road 471. An abandoned railroad line formerly owned by the Orange Belt Railway spanning from Trilby in Pasco County to Sylvan Lake in Seminole County runs northeast and southwest in Tarrytown, and can be found on SR 471 just south of the intersection with SR 50.

The chief industries of Tarrytown are timber and farming. The former Orange Belt Railway line ran through the saw mill on the southwest corner of State Roads 50 and 471.
