= Thomas R. Pierce House =

Historic house in Florida, United States

- U.S. National Register of Historic Places
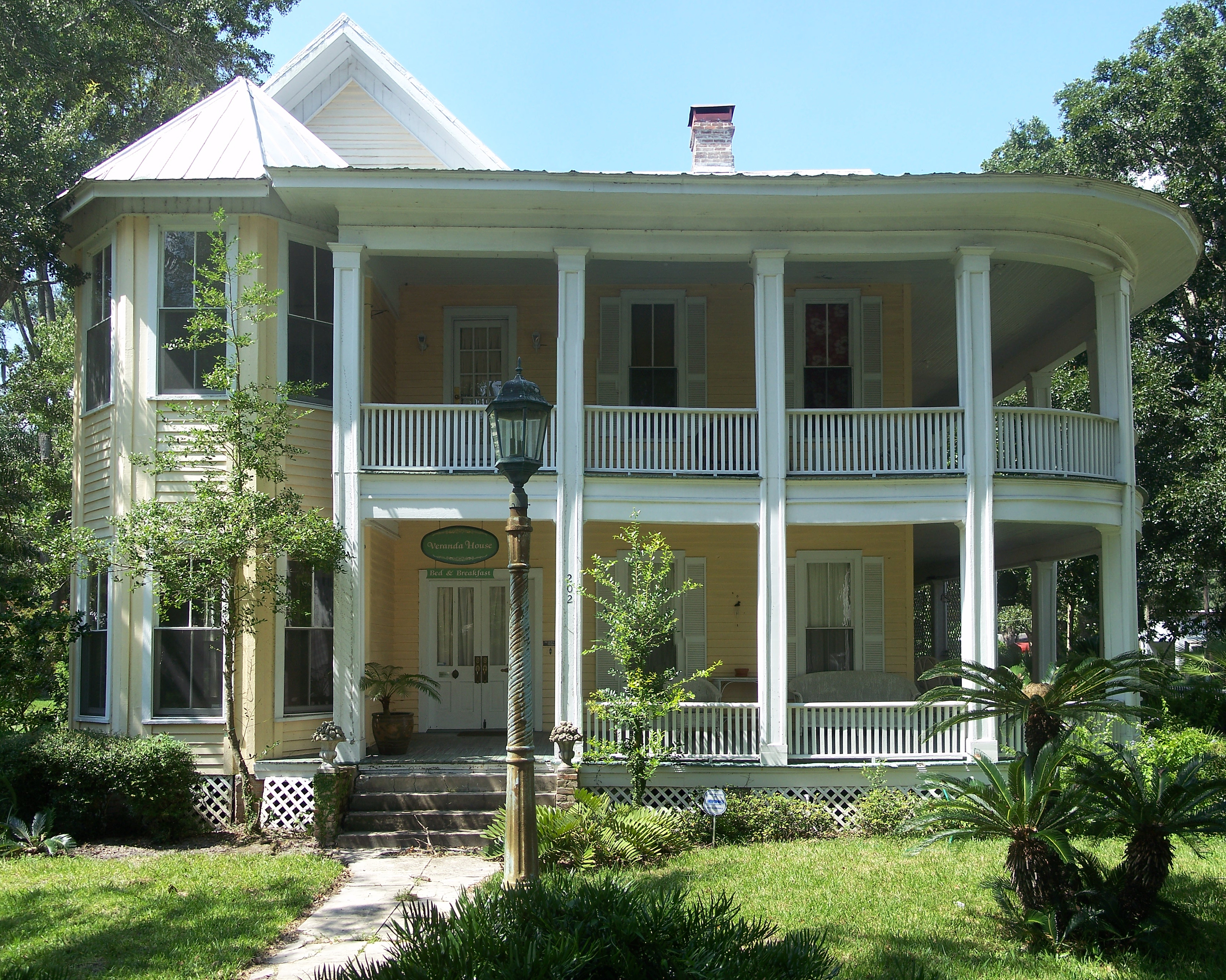

- Location within Florida Location within the United States
- Location: 202 West Noble Avenue, Bushnell, Sumter County, Florida
- Coordinates: 28°39′54.43″N 82°6′54.14″W
- Area: less than one acre
- Built: c. 1888
- Architectural style: Vernacular
- NRHP reference No.: 96000022
- Added to NRHP: February 16, 1996

The Thomas R. Pierce House (also known as the Pierce Hotel) is a historic house in Bushnell, Florida. It is locally significant as an outstanding example of vernacular architecture, and the only historic hotel or boarding house from this period remaining in Bushnell.

== Description and history ==
The vernacular house was built around 1888 and originally functioned as the family home of Thomas R. Pierce, his wife Fannie Pierce, and their four children. It also accommodated more persons and served as a boarding house.

It is a two-story irregularly planned house resting upon stone piers. The house was restored during 1990–94. At the time of its listing it was operated as a bed and breakfast

On February 16, 1996, it was added to the National Register of Historic Places.
