= Sumter County Transit =

Bus transportation provider in Sumter County, Florida

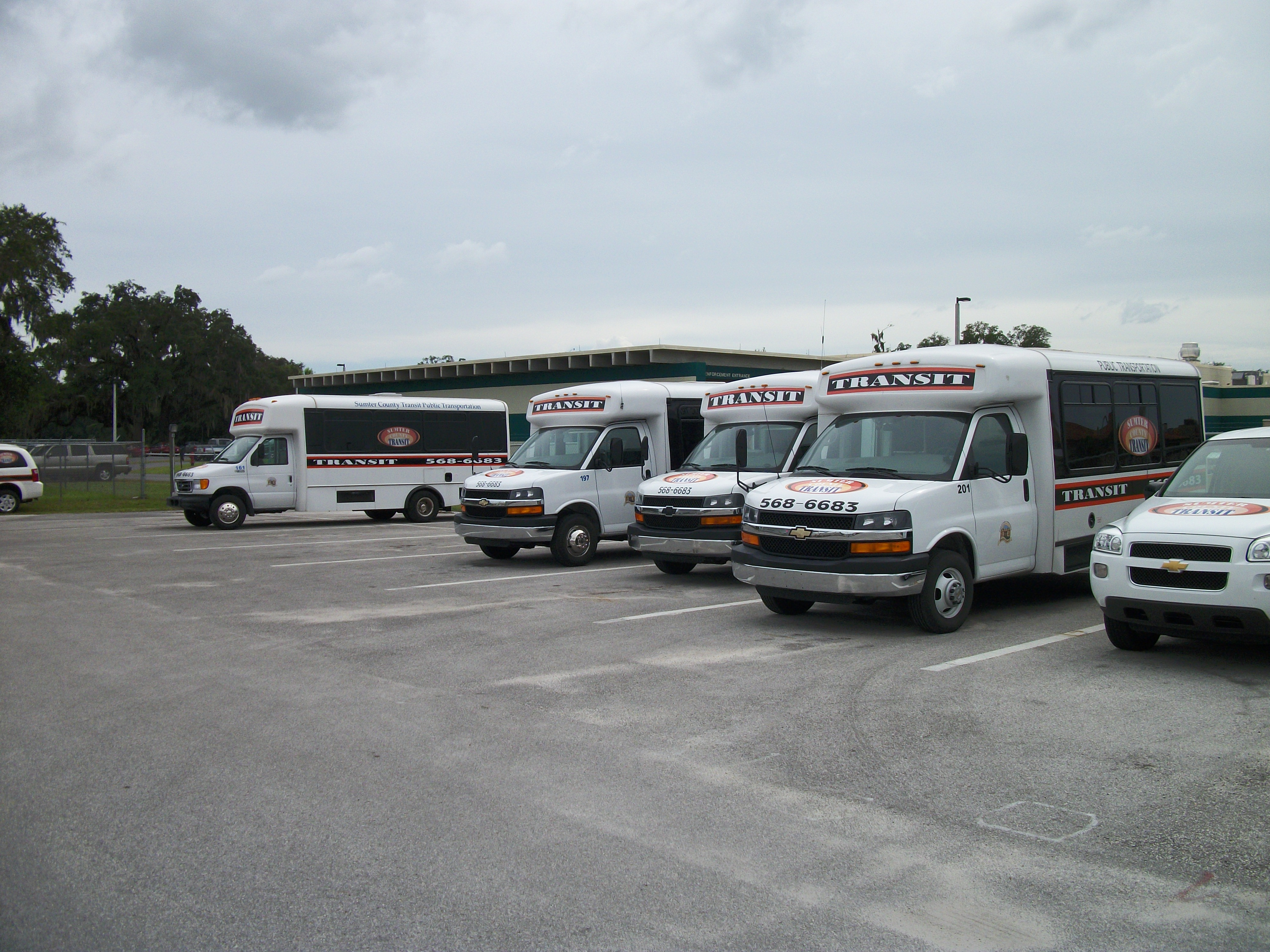
- Various Sumter County Transit buses in storage in Bushnell, Florida.
- Headquarters: 1525 Industrial Drive
- Locale: Wildwood, Florida
- Service area: Sumter County, Florida
- Service type: bus service, paratransit
- Routes: 2
- Fuel type: Diesel

Sumter County Transit is the public transportation agency that serves Sumter County, Florida and only operates on Monday, Wednesday, and Friday.

== Overview ==
Dial-a-ride service is the main component of the bureau's duty, which provides both local county access and transportation to Gainesville, Summerfield, and Leesburg. Two fixed routes also exist. The Orange Line makes two round trips through the southern portion of the county between Center Hill and Sumterville. The Wildwood Circulator runs two-round trips between Wildwood and Sumterville with a direct transfer to the Orange Line at Lake-Sumter Community College.
