= Florida State Road 472 =

State highway in Florida, United States

State Road 472

Route information
- Maintained by FDOT
- Length: 3.406 mi (5.481 km)

Major junctions
- West end: US 17 / US 92 near DeLand
- I-4 near Cassadaga
- East end: CR 4145 in Deltona

Location
- Country: United States
- State: Florida

Highway system
- Florida State Highway System; Interstate; US; State; Former; Pre‑1945; Toll; Scenic
← SR 471	→ SR 482

State Road 472 (SR 472) is an east–west divided highway currently running from U.S. Route 17-92 (US 17/US 92) near DeLand to CR 4145 in Deltona, Florida, United States. With an interchange at Interstate 4 (I-4), SR 472 serves as the primary access to Orlando and Sanford from DeLand. It also provides a direct route to Deltona, terminating at CR 4145 (Howland Boulevard/Graves Avenue).

== Route description ==
SR 472 begins at an interchange with US 17/US 92 in between Orange City and DeLand in Volusia County, heading east as a four-lane divided highway. The road passes through forested areas with some nearby development, curving to the southeast, skirting a corner of DeLand to the northeast. The highway crosses CR 4101, at which point it again runs along the southern border of DeLand. SR 472 reaches an interchange with I-4, at which point it enters Deltona. A short distance past this interchange, SR 472 reaches its eastern terminus at an intersection with CR 4145.

== Major intersections ==
The entire route is in Volusia County.

Location	mi	km	Destinations	Notes
	0.000	0.000	US 17 / US 92 (SR 15 / SR 600) – Orange City, DeLand	Interchange
DeLand	2.311	3.719	CR 4101 – Cassadaga	
Deltona	2.91	4.68	I-4 (SR 400) – Daytona Beach, Sanford, Orlando	I-4 exit 114
Deltona	3.406	5.481	East end of state maintenance	
Deltona	3.447	5.547	CR 4145 (Graves Avenue / Howland Road)	
1.000 mi = 1.609 km; 1.000 km = 0.621 mi
