= Oak Grove, Sumter County, Florida =

Oak Grove, Florida
- Unincorporated community
- Location within Florida
- Coordinates: 28°36′00″N 82°02′36″W
- Country: United States
- State: Florida
- County: Sumter
- Elevation: 92 ft (28 m)
- Time zone: UTC-5 (Eastern (EST))
  - Summer (DST): UTC-4 (EDT)
- Area code: 352
- GNIS feature ID: 287932

Oak Grove is an unincorporated community in Sumter County, Florida, United States. The ZIP code for this community is 33597, which is shared by Webster to the west.
