= Webster, Florida =

- City
- City of Webster
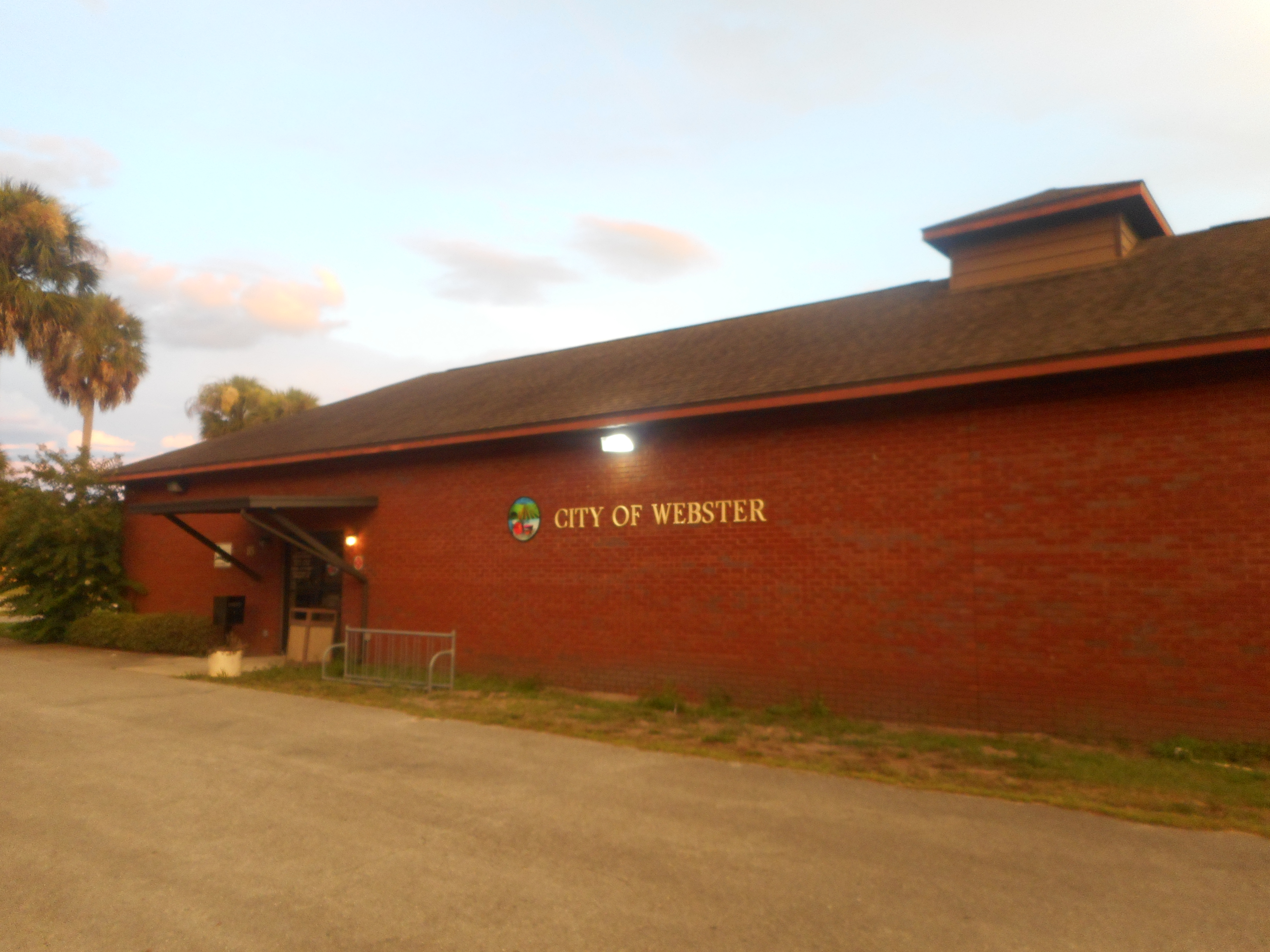
- Webster City Hall

- Seal
- Mottoes: "Rustic, Rural, Real" "Home of the Parson Brown Orange" "The Cucumber Capital"
- Location in Sumter County and the state of Florida
- Coordinates: 28°37′49″N 82°03′12″W
- Country: United States
- State: Florida
- County: Sumter
- Settled: 1855
- Incorporated: 1957

Government
  - Type: Mayor-Council
  - Mayor: Anagalys "Ana" Vigoa
  - Mayor Pro Tem: Allen Dorsey Sr.
  - Councilmembers: Shadae Solomon, Nancy Cherry, and Loretta Ramirez
  - City Manager: Deanna L. Naugler
  - City Clerk: Kristin Green

Area
  - Total: 1.60 sq mi (4.14 km^{2})
  - Land: 1.60 sq mi (4.14 km^{2})
  - Water: 0 sq mi (0.00 km^{2})
- Elevation: 92 ft (28 m)

Population (2020)
  - Total: 778
  - Density: 486.5/sq mi (187.82/km^{2})
- Time zone: UTC-5 (Eastern (EST))
  - Summer (DST): UTC-4 (EDT)
- ZIP code: 33597
- Area code: 352
- FIPS code: 12-75600
- GNIS ID: 2405700
- Website: www.websterfl.com

Webster is a city located in Sumter County, Florida, United States. As of the 2020 census, the city had a total population of 778.

The ZIP Code for this city is 33597, which is shared by Oak Grove, St. Catherine, Croom-a-Coochee, Tarrytown, Linden and part of Mabel.

== Geography ==
According to the United States Census Bureau, the city has a total area of 1.3 square miles (3.4 km^{2}), all land.

=== Climate ===
The climate in this area is characterized by hot, humid summers and generally mild winters. According to the Köppen climate classification, the City of Webster has a humid subtropical climate zone (Cfa).

== Demographics ==
Historical population
Census	Pop.	Note	%±
1910	301		—
1920	361		19.9%
1930	514		42.4%
1940	454		−11.7%
1950	569		25.3%
1960	366		−35.7%
1970	739		101.9%
1980	856		15.8%
1990	746		−12.9%
2000	805		7.9%
2010	785		−2.5%
2020	778		−0.9%
U.S. Decennial Census

=== 2010 and 2020 census ===
Webster racial composition (Hispanics excluded from racial categories) (NH = Non-Hispanic)
Race	Pop 2010	Pop 2020	% 2010	% 2020
White (NH)	317	287	40.38%	36.89%
Black or African American (NH)	235	192	29.94%	24.68%
Native American or Alaska Native (NH)	2	4	0.25%	0.51%
Asian (NH)	1	1	0.13%	0.13%
Pacific Islander or Native Hawaiian (NH)	2	1	0.25%	0.13%
Some other race (NH)	0	3	0.00%	0.39%
Two or more races/Multiracial (NH)	13	26	1.66%	3.34%
Hispanic or Latino (any race)	215	264	27.39%	33.93%
Total	785	778	100.00%	100.00%

As of the 2020 United States census, there were 778 people, 336 households, and 265 families residing in the city.

As of the 2010 United States census, there were 785 people, 386 households, and 276 families residing in the city.

=== 2000 census ===
As of the census of 2000, there were 805 people, 294 households, and 209 families residing in the city. The population density was 608.2 inhabitants per square mile (234.8/km^{2}). There were 353 housing units at an average density of 266.7 units per square mile (103.0 units/km^{2}). The racial makeup of the city was 56.15% White, 34.53% African American, 0.87% Native American, 0.37% Asian, 0.12% Pacific Islander, 4.60% from other races, and 3.35% from two or more races. 15.16% of the population were Hispanic or Latino of any race.

In 2000, there were 294 households, out of which 36.1% had children under the age of 18 living with them, 38.8% were married couples living together, 26.2% had a female householder with no husband present, and 28.9% were non-families. 25.5% of all households were made up of individuals, and 10.5% had someone living alone who was 65 years of age or older. The average household size was 2.70 and the average family size was 3.19.

In 2000, in the city, the population was spread out, with 31.3% under the age of 18, 8.3% from 18 to 24, 25.5% from 25 to 44, 20.5% from 45 to 64, and 14.4% who were 65 years of age or older. The median age was 35 years. For every 100 females, there were 87.6 males. For every 100 females age 18 and over, there were 81.3 males.

In 2000, the median income for a household in the city was $18,000, and the median income for a family was $25,000. Males had a median income of $28,523 versus $22,361 for females. The per capita income for the city was $9,823. 30.6% of the population and 28.7% of families were below the poverty line. Out of the total population, 29.8% of those under the age of 18 and 21.8% of those 65 and older were living below the poverty line.

== Notable people ==
- Keanu Neal, former NFL player

== See also ==
- List of cities in Florida
