= Sumter County, Florida =

County in the United States

- County
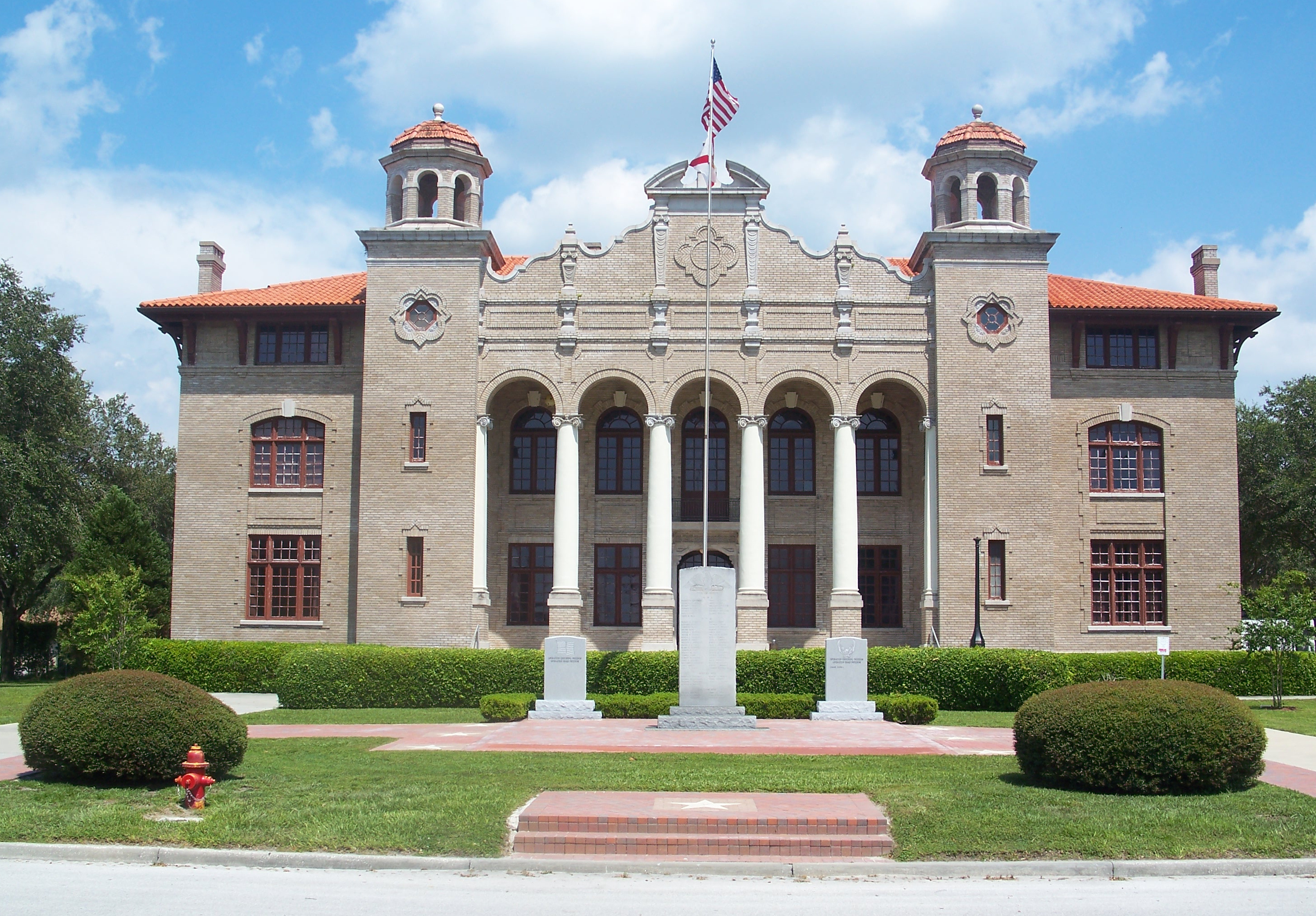
- The Sumter County Courthouse in Bushnell

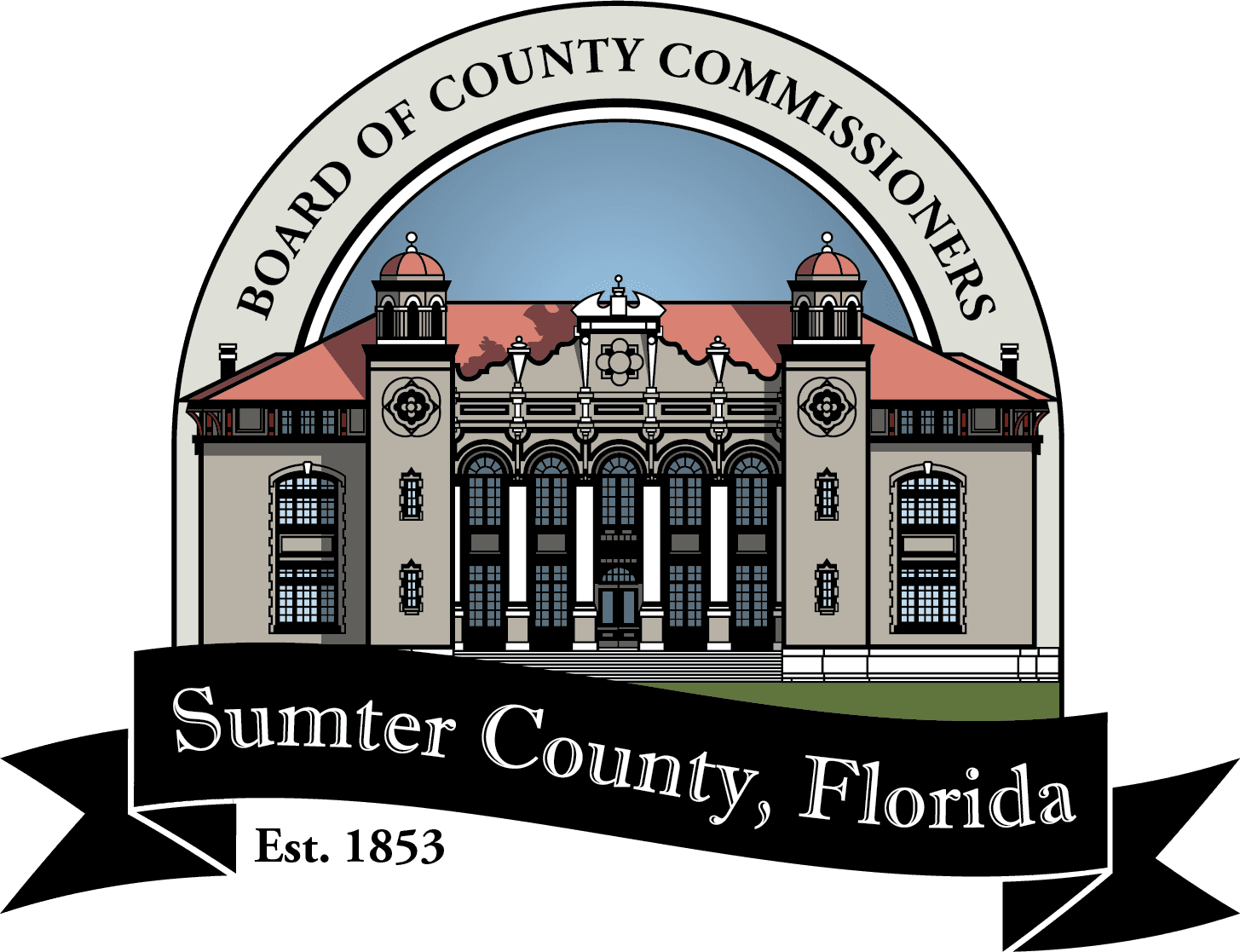
- Seal

- Location within the U.S. state of Florida
- Coordinates: 28.713326°N 82.069522°W
- Country: United States
- State: Florida
- Founded: January 8, 1853
- Named for: Thomas Sumter
- Seat: Bushnell
- Largest community: The Villages

Area
  - Total: 579.829 sq mi (1,501.75 km^{2})
  - Land: 557.144 sq mi (1,443.00 km^{2})
  - Water: 22.685 sq mi (58.75 km^{2}) 3.91%

Population (2020)
  - Total: 129,752
  - Estimate (2025): 157,772 ▲
  - Density: 277.647/sq mi (107.200/km^{2})
- Time zone: UTC−5 (Eastern)
  - Summer (DST): UTC−4 (EDT)
- Area code: 352
- Congressional district: 11th
- Website: sumtercountyfl.gov

Sumter County is a county located in the central portion of the U.S. state of Florida. As of the 2020 census, the population was 129,752, and was estimated to be 154,693 in 2024. Its county seat is Bushnell, and the largest city is Wildwood. The Villages is located in Sumter County.

It has the oldest median age (68.1 years) of any US county in the 2022 estimate.

Sumter County coincides with The Villages, FL Metropolitan Statistical Area, which is included in the Orlando–Lakeland–Deltona, FL Combined Statistical Area.

== History ==
Sumter County was created on January 8, 1853. It was named for General Thomas Sumter, a general in the American Revolutionary War. The county in the past, and to this day by some, is nicknamed "Hog County" most likely because it is home to a large population of wild hogs. Hog hunting is still a favorite pastime of locals in the more rural portions of the county.

Although long extremely rural, Sumter County has sustained an exceptionally large increase in population, almost solely due to the expansion of The Villages retirement complex, a significant portion of which is in the county. This has dramatically changed the demographics of the county and has brought in significant income.

Sumter County was affected by the massive Florida tornado outbreak of February 2, 2007, and a state of emergency was declared.

== Geography ==
According to the United States Census Bureau, the county has a total area of 579.829 square miles (1,501.75 km^{2}), of which 557.144 square miles (1,443.00 km^{2}) is land and 22.685 square miles (58.75 km^{2}) (3.91%) is water. It is the 51st largest county in Florida by total area.

The Wildwood-The Villages, Florida Metropolitan statistical area (MSA) consists of Sumter County. The principal cities of the MSA are Wildwood and The Villages. The MSA was first defined in or before 2003 as The Villages, Florida Micropolitan statistical area (μSA) with The Villages as the principal city. The area was designated an MSA in or before 2013. In 2023, Wildwood was added as a principal city and the name of the MSA.

=== Adjacent counties ===
- Marion County - north
- Lake County - east
- Polk County - southeast
- Pasco County - southwest
- Hernando County - west
- Citrus County - northwest

== Demographics ==
Historical population
Census	Pop.	Note	%±
1860	1,549		—
1870	2,952		90.6%
1880	4,686		58.7%
1890	5,363		14.4%
1900	6,187		15.4%
1910	6,696		8.2%
1920	7,851		17.2%
1930	10,644		35.6%
1940	11,041		3.7%
1950	11,330		2.6%
1960	11,869		4.8%
1970	14,839		25.0%
1980	24,272		63.6%
1990	31,577		30.1%
2000	53,345		68.9%
2010	93,420		75.1%
2020	129,752		38.9%
2025 (est.)	157,772	▲	21.6%
U.S. Decennial Census; 1790–1960 1900–1990; 1990–2000 2010–2020

=== 2020 census ===
As of the 2020 census, the county had a population of 129,752, and the census enumerated 41,080 families. The median age was 68.5 years, with 7.0% of residents under the age of 18 and 58.9% aged 65 or older. For every 100 females there were 99.6 males, and for every 100 females age 18 and over there were 99.1 males age 18 and over.

The racial makeup of the county was 86.4% White, 6.6% Black or African American, 0.3% American Indian and Alaska Native, 1.0% Asian, <0.1% Native Hawaiian and Pacific Islander, 1.5% from some other race, and 4.2% from two or more races. Hispanic or Latino residents of any race comprised 5.8% of the population.

78.4% of residents lived in urban areas, while 21.6% lived in rural areas.

There were 62,907 households in the county, of which 7.7% had children under the age of 18 living in them. Of all households, 58.1% were married-couple households, 12.7% were households with a male householder and no spouse or partner present, and 24.4% were households with a female householder and no spouse or partner present. About 29.8% of all households were made up of individuals and 23.7% had someone living alone who was 65 years of age or older.

The population density was 232.9 inhabitants per square mile (89.9/km^{2}). There were 75,304 housing units at an average density of 135.2 per square mile (52.2/km^{2}), of which 16.5% were vacant. Among occupied housing units, 88.3% were owner-occupied and 11.7% were renter-occupied. The homeowner vacancy rate was 2.4% and the rental vacancy rate was 21.1%.

=== Housing estimates ===
As of the third quarter of 2024, the median home value in Sumter County was $403,970.

=== American Community Survey ===
As of the 2023 American Community Survey, there are 66,941 estimated households in Sumter County with an average of 1.93 persons per household. The county has a median household income of $73,297. Approximately 9.7% of the county's population lives at or below the poverty line. Sumter County has an estimated 25.0% employment rate, with 35.1% of the population holding a bachelor's degree or higher and 93.2% holding a high school diploma.

=== 2000 census ===
As of the 2000 census, there were 53,345 people, 20,779 households, and 15,043 families residing in the county. The population density was 98 inhabitants per square mile (37.8/km^{2}). There were 25,195 housing units at an average density of 46 per square mile (17.8/km^{2}). The racial makeup of the county was 82.60% White, 13.78% Black or African American, 0.51% Native American, 0.41% Asian, 0.05% Pacific Islander, 1.16% from other races, and 1.49% from two or more races. 6.29% of the population were Hispanic or Latino of any race.

There were 20,779 households, out of which 18.80% had children under the age of 18 living with them, 60.90% were married couples living together, 8.40% had a female householder with no husband present, and 27.60% were non-families. 23.50% of all households were made up of individuals, and 13.80% had someone living alone who was 65 years of age or older. The average household size was 2.27 and the average family size was 2.62.

In the county, the population was spread out, with 16.10% under the age of 18, 5.90% from 18 to 24, 23.30% from 25 to 44, 27.30% from 45 to 64, and 27.40% who were 65 years of age or older. The median age was 49 years. For every 100 females, there were 113.10 males. For every 100 females age 18 and over, there were 113.90 males.

The median income for a household in the county was $32,073, and the median income for a family was $36,999. Males had a median income of $27,346 versus $21,145 for females. The per capita income for the county was $16,830. About 9.60% of families and 13.70% of the population were below the poverty line, including 26.00% of those under age 18 and 7.70% of those age 65 or over.

=== Racial and ethnic composition ===
Note: the US Census treats Hispanic/Latino as an ethnic category. This table excludes Latinos from the racial categories and assigns them to a separate category. Hispanics/Latinos may be of any race.

Race / ethnicity (NH = non-Hispanic)	Pop. 1980	Pop. 1990	Pop. 2000	Pop. 2010	Pop. 2020
White alone (NH)	19,149 (78.89%)	25,526 (80.84%)	41,796 (78.35%)	77,338 (82.79%)	109,213 (84.17%)
Black or African American alone (NH)	4,504 (18.56%)	5,064 (16.04%)	7,202 (13.50%)	8,736 (9.35%)	8,313 (6.41%)
Native American or Alaska Native alone (NH)	84 (0.35%)	162 (0.51%)	241 (0.45%)	294 (0.31%)	311 (0.24%)
Asian alone (NH)	30 (0.12%)	51 (0.16%)	216 (0.40%)	609 (0.65%)	1,238 (0.95%)
Pacific Islander alone (NH)	—	—	28 (0.05%)	28 (0.03%)	31 (0.02%)
Other race alone (NH)	0 (0.00%)	12 (0.04%)	13 (0.02%)	77 (0.08%)	320 (0.25%)
Mixed race or multiracial (NH)	—	—	493 (0.92%)	756 (0.81%)	2,743 (2.11%)
Hispanic or Latino (any race)	505 (2.08%)	762 (2.41%)	3,356 (6.29%)	5,582 (5.98%)	7,583 (5.84%)
Total	24,272 (100.00%)	31,577 (100.00%)	53,345 (100.00%)	93,420 (100.00%)	129,752 (100.00%)

== Law enforcement ==
Sumter County Sheriff's Office
- Abbreviation: SCSO

Jurisdictional structure
- Operations jurisdiction: Sumter County, Florida, Florida, USA
- General nature: Local civilian police

Operational structure
- Headquarters: Wildwood, Florida
- Agency executive: Patrick Breeden, Sheriff

Website
- Sumter County Sheriff

The Sumter County Sheriff's Office is accredited by the Commission for Florida Law Enforcement Accreditation, Inc. and recognized by the Commission on Accreditation for Law Enforcement Agencies. It primarily patrols the unincorporated areas of Sumter County.

Federal Correctional Complex, Coleman of the Federal Bureau of Prisons (BOP) is located in the county.

It includes:

- Federal Correctional Institution, Coleman Low (FCI Coleman Low)
- Federal Correctional Institution, Coleman Medium (FCI Coleman Medium)
- United States Penitentiary I, Coleman (Coleman USP I)
- United States Penitentiary II, Coleman (Coleman USP II)

== Politics ==
United States presidential election results for Sumter County, Florida
Year	Republican		Democratic		Third party(ies)	
Year	No.	%	No.	%	No.	%
1892	0	0.00%	444	59.28%	305	40.72%
1896	89	13.71%	524	80.74%	36	5.55%
1900	53	12.62%	343	81.67%	24	5.71%
1904	61	12.20%	316	63.20%	123	24.60%
1908	62	12.60%	343	69.72%	87	17.68%
1912	22	3.94%	417	74.73%	119	21.33%
1916	70	9.42%	599	80.62%	74	9.96%
1920	219	18.96%	921	79.74%	15	1.30%
1924	108	15.93%	481	70.94%	89	13.13%
1928	1,152	55.60%	909	43.87%	11	0.53%
1932	276	11.43%	2,138	88.57%	0	0.00%
1936	734	29.86%	1,724	70.14%	0	0.00%
1940	253	9.60%	2,382	90.40%	0	0.00%
1944	276	13.06%	1,838	86.94%	0	0.00%
1948	251	11.66%	1,411	65.57%	490	22.77%
1952	1,054	31.64%	2,277	68.36%	0	0.00%
1956	1,061	31.30%	2,329	68.70%	0	0.00%
1960	1,120	32.95%	2,279	67.05%	0	0.00%
1964	1,631	41.93%	2,259	58.07%	0	0.00%
1968	910	17.96%	1,277	25.21%	2,879	56.83%
1972	3,695	76.71%	1,107	22.98%	15	0.31%
1976	2,212	31.20%	4,721	66.59%	157	2.21%
1980	3,671	44.41%	4,380	52.98%	216	2.61%
1984	6,255	64.37%	3,461	35.62%	1	0.01%
1988	5,936	59.98%	3,900	39.41%	60	0.61%
1992	4,366	35.41%	5,027	40.77%	2,936	23.81%
1996	5,960	38.70%	7,017	45.56%	2,423	15.73%
2000	12,127	54.48%	9,637	43.29%	497	2.23%
2004	19,800	62.18%	11,584	36.38%	458	1.44%
2008	30,866	63.01%	17,655	36.04%	462	0.94%
2012	40,646	67.13%	19,524	32.25%	376	0.62%
2016	52,730	68.27%	22,638	29.31%	1,870	2.42%
2020	62,761	67.76%	29,341	31.68%	522	0.56%
2024	72,134	68.30%	32,551	30.82%	923	0.87%

== Transportation ==
=== Railroads ===
CSX operates one rail line within the county. Amtrak formerly provided passenger rail service to Wildwood, but the stop was terminated in late 2004. Other lines have existed in the past, most notably one from Coleman southeast towards Auburndale in Polk County, part of which includes the General James A. Van Fleet State Trail in Mabel. Amtrak ran along this line until 1988. Another line ran from Croom in Hernando County to Center Hill. Today, part of it is a Forest Road in Withlacoochee State Forest north of the Sumter Rest Area on I-75. A fourth one was part of the Orange Belt Railway, which ran from Trilby in Pasco County to Sylvan Lake in Seminole County. This runs along the south side of State Road 50 east of Tarrytown.

=== Interstates and expressways ===
- I-75 (SR 93) runs north and south across the western and northern part of the county, with interchanges at County Roads 476B & 673(Exit 309), SR 48 (Exit 314) CR 470(Exit 321), Florida's Turnpike(Exit 328), and SR 44(Exit 329).
- Florida's Turnpike (SR 91) runs north and south from Southeastern and Central Florida. Only three interchanges exist in the county; US 301 (Exit 304), SR 44 (Exit 307), and at the northern terminus at I-75 (unmarked Exit 309), in Wildwood.

=== Surface roads ===
- US 301 (SR 35) is the main local road through Sumter County, running southwest to northeast.
- SR 44 runs east and west through the northern part of the county from Rutland into Lake County.
- CR 470: runs east and west from SR 44 near the Sumter-Citrus County Line along the west side of Lake Panasoffkee, then briefly joins US 301 in Sumterville before heading east again towards Lake County.
- CR 48 runs mostly east and west through Central Sumter County. It spans from Floral City in Citrus County to Howey-in-the Hills in Lake County. Until December 2016 the segment in Bushnell between I-75 (Exit 314) and US 301 was designated as a state road. Between the western terminus and US 301, it is also shared by the DeSoto Trail.
- CR 476: East-West Bi-County road running from Nobleton in Hernando County to Webster. The road spans as far west as US 19 along the Chassahowitzka National Wildlife Refuge.
- SR 50 runs east and west across the southern part of the county from Withlacoochee State Forest in Hernando County through Tarrytown and Mabel before entering Lake County.
- SR 471 runs north and south from Polk County north of US 98 into US 301 in Sumterville.
- CR 475: Two north–south roads that were previously one until Interstate 75 was built. One section spans from SR 48 in Bushnell to CR 470 on the southeast corner of Exit 321 on I-75 in Lake Panasoffkee. The other starts at SR 44 in Wildwood west of Exit 329 on I-75 and crosses the Marion County line towards Ocala.
- CR 462: is a west to east rural county road in northern Sumter County.
- CR 466: is a west to east rural county road in northern Sumter County.
- CR 466A: is a suffixed alternate route of CR 466.
- CR 476A: is a suffixed alternate route of CR 476 within Busnnell.
- CR 476B: is a suffixed alternate route of CR 476. It spans northwest from I-75 at Exit 309 to CR 476 west of Bushnell.
- CR 673: is a west to east rural county road in southern Sumter County spanning from I-75 at Exit 309 to US 301 in St. Catherine.

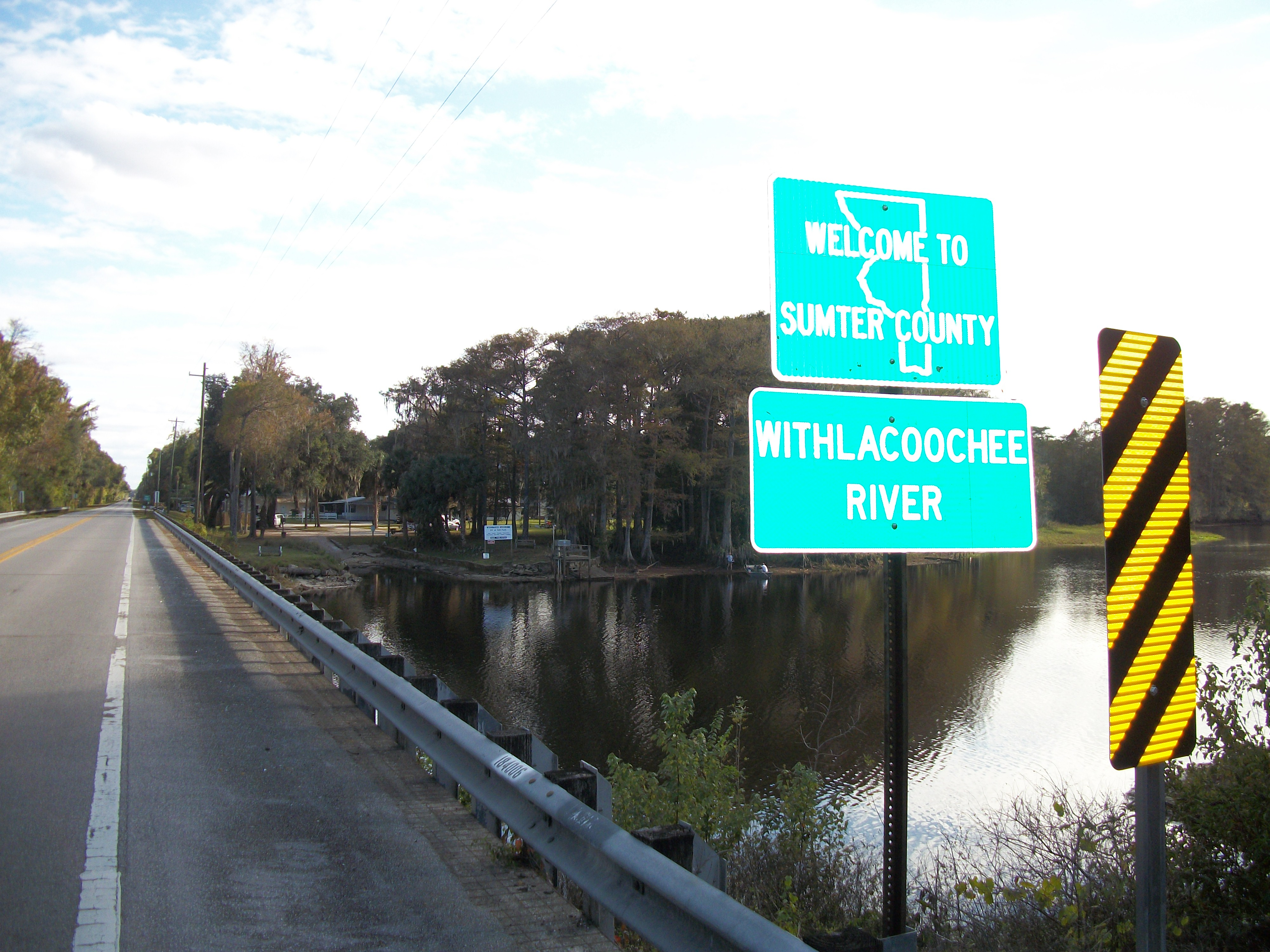
Entering Sumter County over the Withlacoochee River on County Road 48

=== Scenic Sumter Heritage Byway ===
The Sumter County Chamber of Commerce, the cities of Webster and Bushnell, the Sumter County government, businesses, community leaders, veterans’ groups, and individuals worked to have 62 miles of road in Sumter County designated by the state of Florida as a Florida Scenic Byway. On September 1, 2010, the Scenic Sumter Heritage Byway was designated a candidate for the Florida Scenic Highway Program. The Scenic Sumter Heritage Byway became the 24th highway to be designated a Florida Scenic Highway by the Florida Department of Transportation in June 2013. Points of interest along the route include the Dade Battlefield State Historic Site, the Sumter County Farmer's Market, Lake Panasoffkee, the Florida National Cemetery. On January 25, 2014, community leaders, supporters of the byway, and Assistant Secretary of the Florida Department of Transportation Brian Blanchard cut the ribbon to the highway at the Dade Battlefield State Historic Site in Bushnell.

=== Public Transportation ===
Sumter County operates Sumter County Transit, which operates three fixed-route services, as well as paratransit service.

== Education ==
Sumter District Schools operates district public and private schools in Sumter County.

The Villages Charter Schools is a K-12 charter school in unincorporated northern Sumter County in The Villages CDP. Children are eligible to attend the charter school if one or both of their parents work for The Villages.

Among other schools in the county is South Sumter Middle School, a junior high school for students in grades 6–8, and Lake-Sumter State College has a campus in Sumterville that serves the community.

=== Libraries ===
Sumter County has five branches serving its community as well as a Lake-Sumter State College campus library that is open to the public.

- Bushnell Public Library
- E.C. Rowell Public Library
- Panasoffkee Community Library
- Villages Public Library (Belvedere)
- Villages Public Library (Pinellas Plaza)
- Lake-Sumter State College Library (Sumterville)

The Sumter County Library Services began servicing the Wahoo, Center Hill, Linden, Croom-A-Coochee areas through the county's Library on Wheels program in 2008.

== Communities ==
=== Cities ===
- Bushnell
- Center Hill
- Coleman
- Webster
- Wildwood

=== Census-designated places ===
- Lake Panasoffkee
- The Villages

=== Other unincorporated communities ===
- Croom-A-Coochee
- Cumpressco
- Linden
- Mabel
- Oak Grove
- Orange Home
- Oxford
- Royal
- Rutland
- St. Catherine
- Sumterville
- Tarrytown
- Wahoo

== See also ==
- National Register of Historic Places listings in Sumter County, Florida
