= Lake Panasoffkee, Florida =

- CDP
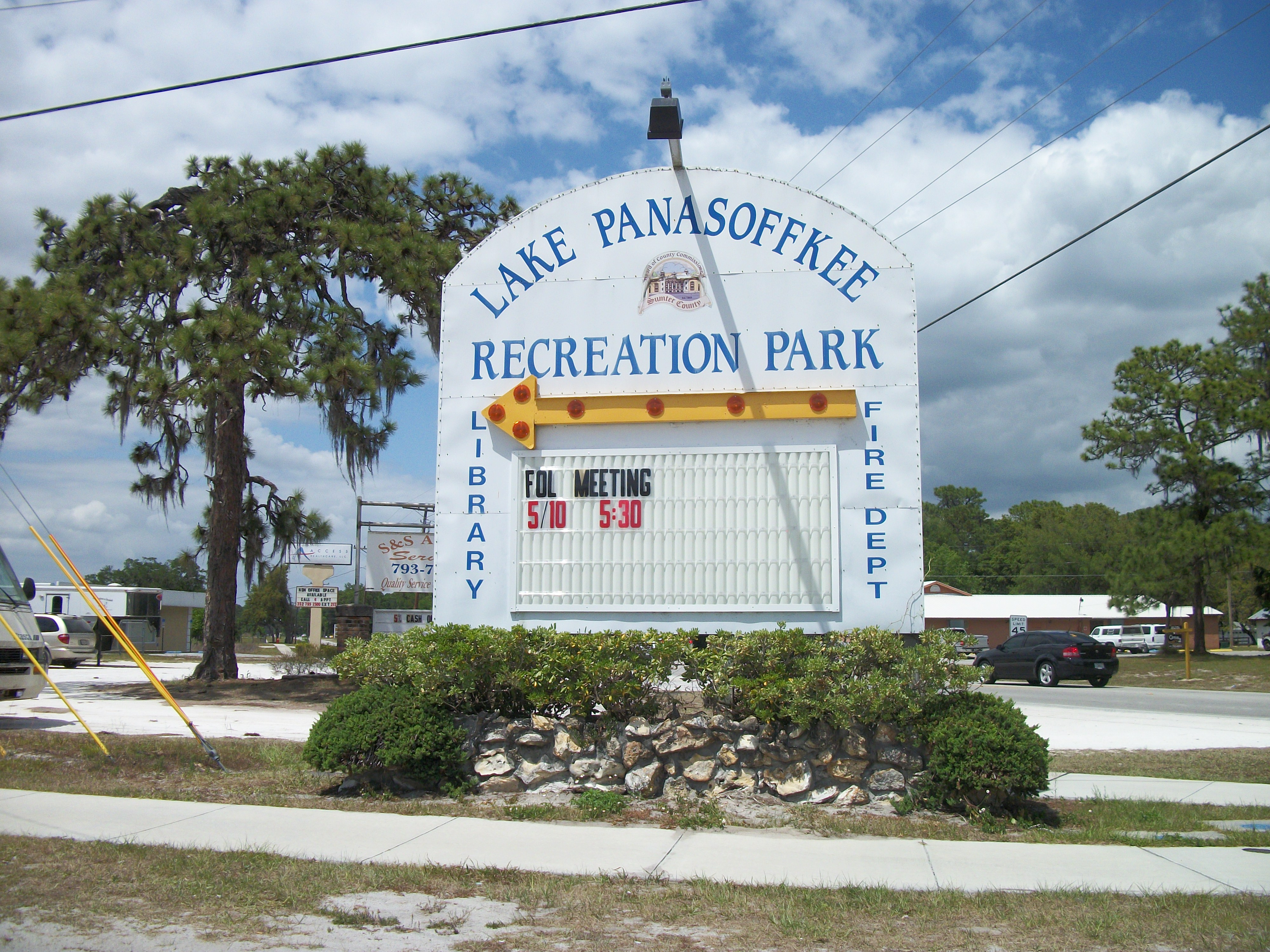
- Lake Panasoffkee's Recreational Park off of CR 470

- Location in Sumter County and the state of Florida
- Coordinates: 28°46′49″N 82°07′14″W
- Country: United States
- State: Florida
- County: Sumter

Area
  - Total: 6.60 sq mi (17.10 km^{2})
  - Land: 4.30 sq mi (11.14 km^{2})
  - Water: 2.30 sq mi (5.96 km^{2})
- Elevation: 52 ft (16 m)

Population (2020)
  - Total: 4,072
  - Density: 947.0/sq mi (365.65/km^{2})
- Time zone: UTC-5 (Eastern (EST))
  - Summer (DST): UTC-4 (EDT)
- ZIP code: 33538
- Area code: 352
- FIPS code: 12-38575
- GNIS feature ID: 2403202

Lake Panasoffkee is a census-designated place (CDP) in Sumter County, Florida, United States. As of the 2020 census, Lake Panasoffkee had a population of 4,072.

== History ==
=== Early inhabitants ===
Boggy Island was an autonomous black Seminole village that was settled by Central African slaves from Kongo. Black Seminoles settled near the Boggy Island area of Lake Panasoffkee around 1813 and named it Sitarkey's Village after Sitarkey, an Alachua Seminole who had settled in the area. Nearby laid the areas of Gum Slough and Indian Mound Springs. The Seminoles used the Lake Panasoffkee area to hold councils and Green Corn Dances.

The black Seminoles raised corn, rice, and sugar cane, which Horatio Dexter, one of the first settlers in the area, gave them in 1822. In addition, residents in Sitarkey's Village raised livestock, including cattle, horses, and hogs. They also possibly planted one of the oldest orange groves in Florida.

=== Second Seminole War ===
Generally, the Sitakey's Village area was untouched during the Second Seminole War, allowing black Seminole families to use the area as a refuge from the war. The United States Army, however, did search the village twice. Looking for Seminole warriors, the Second and Eighth Infantry divisions, led by Colonel Bennet Riley and Colonel W. J. Worth, traveled from Fort McClure to the Lake Panasoffkee area on June 10, 1840. On the morning of June 11, the troops found an empty village.

After the battle of Wahoo Swamp, Osceola, possibly suffering from the effects of malaria that he contracted during the Seminole occupation of Fort Drane moved to the Panasoffkee Swamp to live with the black Seminoles who regarded him with devotion.

On January 10, 1837, General Thomas Sidney Jesup, looking for Osceola, raided the village. Osceola and three warriors fled. Jesup captured 16 black Seminoles while the rest of the village escaped. In all, Osceola, 50 warriors, and their families left for the headwaters of the Ocklawaha River. Twelve days later, Jesup led his troops from Fort Armstrong to the Ocklawaha River.

=== Modern town ===
According to Broward Mill, the past president of the Sumter County Historical Society, Lake Panasoffkee from the time that Sumter County was settled by whites until damaging freezes which wiped out the area's citrus industry in the 1880s and 1890s.

Charles G. King, a Cleveland entrepreneur, bought 2,500 acres (square kilometers) in Lake Panasoffkee and developed 737 acres (square kilometers) into Monarch Grove in 1908. An oak hammock on the property was left undisturbed. King and his employees used the sour oranges planted by the Seminoles for orange stock. In 1926, the grove produced about 40,000 boxes of oranges.

Among the evidence was a group of house foundations and chimneys located in places where there were no known white settlers. County officials later believed that the cemetery was a family cemetery as the newer marked graves listed the names of the few people known to be buried there.

=== Lake Panasoffkee dredging ===
According to Florida Fish and Wildlife Conservation commissioners Bob Wattendorf and Marty Hale, Lake Panasoffkee had 15 fish camps and was considered to be one of the state's best places to fish.

In 1981, water levels in Lake Panasoffkee dropped to levels that had not been seen since 1962, the year the Wysong Dam was built. Southwest Florida Water Management District officials discussed the construction of a temporary dam to elevate water levels. Lake Panasoffkee residents believed that the Wysong Dam contributed to the destruction of the Withlacoochee River.

=== Little Miss Lake Panasoffkee case ===
On February 19, 1971, two hitchhikers from Illinois discovered the partially decomposed body of an unidentified young woman between the ages of 17 and 24 years old under the northbound lane of Lake Panasoffkee's Interstate 75 overpass. She was found with a man's belt around her neck. Sumter County authorities named her "Little Miss Lake Panasoffkee" and buried her in the Oak Grove Cemetery in Wildwood.

The sheriff's department made several attempts to identify the woman. In 2012, the Sumter County Sheriff's Department asked the University of South Florida's Tampa Bay Cold Case Project to reexamine the remains of "Little Miss Lake Panasoffkee". An isotope analysis performed by the project indicated she could have been an immigrant from Greece, possibly hailing from the town of Lavrion (located 60 miles (96 kilometers) southeast of Athens). The victim is believed to have moved to the United States between one and three months prior to her murder. The new information contradicted the Sumter County Sheriff's Department's initial assumption that the Jane Doe was either white or Native American; they had created composite sketches reflecting those ethnicities. Sumter County authorities determined, based on the time of her death, that she was possibly visiting the Tarpon Springs area for the celebration of Epiphany on January 6, 1971. In 2025, she was identified as 21-year-old Maureen Rowan (née Minor).

== Geography ==
According to the United States Census Bureau, the CDP has a total area of 4.1 square miles (11 km^{2}), of which 4.0 square miles (10 km^{2}) is land and 0.25% is water.

== Demographics ==
Historical population
Census	Pop.	Note	%±
2020	4,072		—
U.S. Decennial Census

=== 2020 census ===
As of the 2020 census, Lake Panasoffkee had a population of 4,072. The median age was 50.5 years. 19.0% of residents were under the age of 18 and 27.2% of residents were 65 years of age or older. For every 100 females there were 93.8 males, and for every 100 females age 18 and over there were 92.5 males age 18 and over.

0.0% of residents lived in urban areas, while 100.0% lived in rural areas.

There were 1,826 households in Lake Panasoffkee, of which 21.0% had children under the age of 18 living in them. Of all households, 40.7% were married-couple households, 24.2% were households with a male householder and no spouse or partner present, and 26.1% were households with a female householder and no spouse or partner present. About 34.4% of all households were made up of individuals and 19.6% had someone living alone who was 65 years of age or older.

There were 2,458 housing units, of which 25.7% were vacant. The homeowner vacancy rate was 2.2% and the rental vacancy rate was 18.6%.

Racial composition as of the 2020 census
Race	Number	Percent
White	3,525	86.6%
Black or African American	174	4.3%
American Indian and Alaska Native	19	0.5%
Asian	17	0.4%
Native Hawaiian and Other Pacific Islander	3	0.1%
Some other race	91	2.2%
Two or more races	243	6.0%
Hispanic or Latino (of any race)	239	5.9%

=== 2000 census ===
As of the 2000 census, there were 3,413 people, 1,644 households, and 1,045 families residing in the CDP. The population density was 846.6 inhabitants per square mile (326.9/km^{2}). There were 2,348 housing units at an average density of 582.4 per square mile (224.9/km^{2}). The racial makeup of the CDP was 97.01% White, 0.64% African American, 0.73% Native American, 0.47% Asian, 0.15% from other races, and 1.00% from two or more races. Hispanic or Latino of any race were 0.91% of the population.

There were 1,644 households, out of which 16.8% had children under the age of 18 living with them, 52.7% were married couples living together, 7.6% had a female householder with no husband present, and 36.4% were non-families. 30.8% of all households were made up of individuals, and 18.7% had someone living alone who was 65 years of age or older. The average household size was 2.08 and the average family size was 2.52.

In the CDP, the population was spread out, with 15.4% under the age of 18, 5.6% from 18 to 24, 20.1% from 25 to 44, 25.5% from 45 to 64, and 33.5% who were 65 years of age or older. The median age was 53 years. For every 100 females, there were 94.1 males. For every 100 females age 18 and over, there were 92.0 males.

The median income for a household in the CDP was $25,930, and the median income for a family was $31,897. Males had a median income of $26,483 versus $17,985 for females. The per capita income for the CDP was $18,149. About 8.1% of families and 12.0% of the population were below the poverty line, including 17.6% of those under age 18 and 8.8% of those age 65 or over.

== Preserves ==
The Lake Panasoffkee park and preserve protects 9,911 acres (40.11 km^{2}) and offers birdwatching, biking, camping, horseback riding, fishing, hiking and hunting. It is accessed from the south side of State Route 44 two miles (3 km) west of Interstate 75. Similar recreational opportunities (except no biking) are also offered at the 1,118-acre (4.52 km^{2}) Panasoffkee Outlet park and preserve. Both areas are protected by the Southwest Florida Water Management District.

Wysong Park is a 5-acre property located on the Withlacoochee River in Lake Panasoffkee. The Wysong-Coogler Dam is located there as well.

== Notable people ==
- Dollya Black, drag queen
