= List of festivals in the United States =

Festivals of the United States
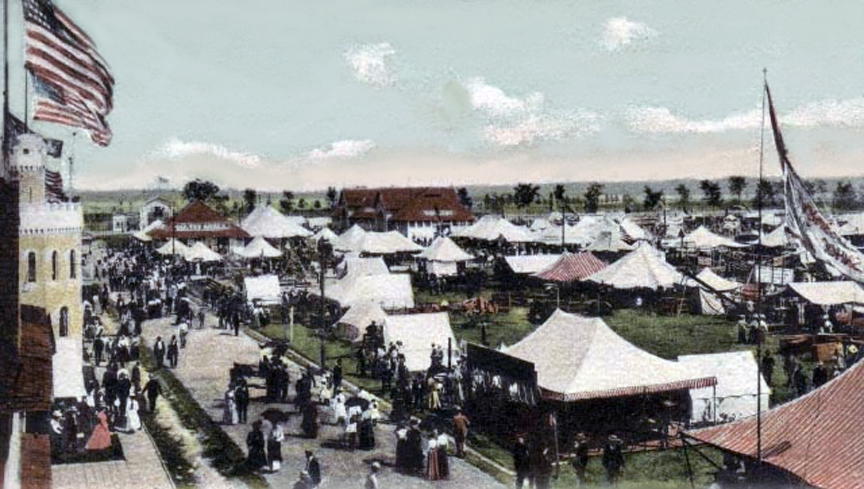

External sublists
- By state: Festivals of Florida; Festivals of Georgia; Festivals of Louisiana; Festivals of Michigan; Festivals of New Jersey; Festivals of Pennsylvania; Festivals of Virginia
- By city: Festivals of Buffalo, New York; Festivals of Chicago; Events of Houston; Festivals of Indianapolis; Festivals and fairs of the San Francisco Bay Area; Street fairs and parades of Seattle; Festivals and events of Tulsa, Oklahoma
- By type: Music festivals of the United States (US); Film festivals of the US; Dogwood festivals of the US

Regional types
- Bluegrass music festival; Blues festival; Country music festival; County fair; Dogwood festival; Hip hop festival; Jazz festival; mushroom festival; Old-time music festival; Pow wow; Ribfest; State fair; Strawberry festival

Related topics
- Culture of the United States (US); Tourism in the US (attractions); Public holidays in the US

The United States hosts festivals of diverse types, among them regional festivals, commerce festivals, fairs, food festivals, arts festivals, religious festivals, folk festivals, and recurring festivals on holidays.

Festivals unique to the United States (and Canada and Mexico in some cases) include pow wows, Rocky Mountain Rendezvous, blues festivals, county fairs, state fairs, ribfests, and strawberry festivals. The first U.S. state fair was that of New York, held in 1841 in Syracuse, and has been held annually to the present year. The second state fair was in Detroit, Michigan, which started in 1849.

The list is sorted by geographic location and lists other festival lists.

== Lists of festivals by locale ==
=== Territories ===
- List of festivals in American Samoa
- List of festivals in Guam
- List of festivals in Puerto Rico
- List of festivals in the United States Virgin Islands

=== Cities ===
- List of festivals in Atlanta
- List of festivals in Buffalo, New York
- List of festivals in Chicago (music)
- List of events in Houston
- List of attractions and events in Indianapolis
- List of San Francisco Bay Area festivals and fairs
- List of Seattle street fairs and parades
- List of festivals and events in Tulsa, Oklahoma

=== States ===
- List of festivals in Alabama
- List of festivals in Alaska
- List of festivals in Arizona
- List of festivals in Arkansas
- List of festivals in California (San Francisco)
- List of festivals in Colorado
- List of festivals in Connecticut
- List of festivals in Delaware
- List of festivals in Florida
- (Georgia (U.S. state)) List of festivals in Georgia (Atlanta)
- List of festivals in Hawaii
- List of festivals in Idaho
- List of festivals in Illinois (Chicago)
- List of festivals in Indiana (Indianapolis)
- List of festivals in Iowa
- List of festivals in Kansas
- List of festivals in Kentucky
- List of festivals in Louisiana
- List of festivals in Maine
- List of festivals in Maryland
- List of festivals in Massachusetts
- List of festivals in Michigan
- List of festivals in Minnesota
- List of festivals in Mississippi
- List of festivals in Missouri
- List of festivals in Montana
- List of festivals in Nebraska
- List of festivals in Nevada
- (New Jersey) List of festivals in New Hampshire
- List of festivals in New Jersey
- List of festivals in New Mexico
- (New York (state)) List of festivals in New York (Buffalo)
- List of festivals in North Carolina
- List of festivals in North Dakota
- List of festivals in Ohio
- List of festivals in Oklahoma (Tulsa)
- List of festivals in Oregon
- List of festivals in Pennsylvania
- List of festivals in Rhode Island
- List of festivals in South Carolina
- List of festivals in South Dakota
- List of festivals in Tennessee
- List of festivals in Texas (Houston)
- List of festivals in Utah
- List of festivals in Vermont
- List of festivals in Virginia
- (Washington (state)) List of festivals in Washington (Seattle)
- List of festivals in West Virginia
- List of festivals in Wisconsin
- List of festivals in Wyoming

== Festivals by type ==
=== Alternative festivals ===
- Burning Man — Black Rock City, Nevada
- Coney Island Mermaid Parade — New York City, New York
- Exotic Erotic Ball — San Francisco, California
- How Weird Street Faire — San Francisco, California
- King Mango Strut — Coral Gables, Florida
- New York's Village Halloween Parade — New York City, New York
- Porcupine Freedom Festival — Lancaster, New Hampshire
- Rainbow Gathering — national and regional locations, worldwide
- Roswell UFO Festival — Roswell, New Mexico
- Sawdust Art Festival — Laguna Beach, California
- SLUG Queen — Eugene, Oregon

=== Arts and crafts festivals ===
- Art in the Pearl — Portland, Oregon
- Allentown Arts Festival — Buffalo, New York
- Amish Acres Arts & Crafts Festival — Nappanee, Indiana
- Ann Arbor Art Fairs — Ann Arbor, Michigan
- Bayou City Art Festival — Houston, Texas
- Catoctin Colorfest — Thurmont, Maryland
- Central Pennsylvania Festival of the Arts — State College, Pennsylvania
- Cherry Creek Arts Festival — Cherry Creek, Colorado
- Detroit Festival of the Arts — Detroit, Michigan
- Dogwood Arts Festival — Knoxville, Tennessee
- Festival of the Arts — Grand Rapids, Michigan
- Half Moon Bay Art and Pumpkin Festival — Half Moon Bay, California
- Lake Eden Arts Festival (LEAF) — Black Mountain, North Carolina
- Mayfair Festival of the Arts — Allentown, Pennsylvania
- St. James Art Fair — Louisville, Kentucky
- Sawdust Art Festival — Laguna Beach, California
- Summer Camp Music Festival — Chillicothe, Illinois
- Vermont Quilt Festival — Essex, Vermont

=== Beer festivals ===
- Great American Beer Festival (established 1982) — Denver, Colorado
- Houston Beer Fest (established 2011) — Houston, Texas
- Oregon Brewers Festival (established 1988) — Portland, Oregon

=== Celebration/talk festivity ===
- Cheeseburger in Caseville — Caseville, Michigan
- ComFest — Columbus, Ohio
- Friendship Festival — Buffalo, New York and Fort Erie, Ontario, Canada
- Gasparilla Pirate Festival — [

=== Contemporary Christian Festivals ===
- Cornerstone Festival — Bushnell, Illinois
- Creation Festival — The Gorge Amphitheatre in George, Washington and Agape Farm in Mount Union, Pennsylvania
- LifeLight Festival — Sioux Falls, South Dakota
- Sonshine Festival — Willmar, Minnesota

=== Culture, heritage and folk festivals ===
- Aloha Festivals — Hawaii
- Arlington International Film Festival — Arlington, Massachusetts
- Borderfest — Rio Grande Valley, Texas
- Cleveland Feast of the Assumption Festival — Cleveland, Ohio
- Dublin Irish Festival — Dublin, Ohio
- Feast of San Gennaro — New York City, New York
- Festival Latinoamericano — Provo, Utah
- FinnFestUSA
- Folkmoot — Waynesville, North Carolina
- Greek Food Festival of Dallas — Dallas, Texas
- Hungarian Festival — New Brunswick, New Jersey
- Indy Irish Festival — Indianapolis, Indiana
- International Children's Festival — Washington, DC
- Italian Heritage Festival — Wheeling, West Virginia
- Johnny Appleseed Festival — Fort Wayne, Indiana
- Kansas City Irish Fest — Kansas City, Missouri
- Little Italy Festival — Clinton, Indiana
- Lowell Folk Festival — Lowell, Massachusetts
- Mothman Festival — Point Pleasant, West Virginia
- New Jersey Folk Festival — New Brunswick, New Jersey
- New Orleans Jazz & Heritage Festival — New Orleans, Louisiana
- Nisei Week — Little Tokyo, Los Angeles, California
- North Texas Irish Festival — Dallas, Texas
- Northwest Folklife Festival — Seattle, Washington
- Pepper Jelly Festival — Thomaston, Alabama
- Pittsburgh Folk Festival — Pittsburgh, Pennsylvania
- Portugal Day Festival — Newark, New Jersey
- Taste of Polonia — Chicago, Illinois
- Texas Folklife Festival — San Antonio, Texas
- Tulip Time Festival — Holland, Michigan
- World of Nations Celebration — Jacksonville, Florida
- World's Largest Disco — Buffalo, New York
- Ypsilanti Heritage Festival — Ypsilanti, Michigan

=== Film festivals ===
- List of film festivals in the United States

=== Fine art and theatre festivals ===
- Alabama Shakespeare Festival — Montgomery, Alabama
- Allentown Art Festival — Buffalo, New York
- Arizona Renaissance Festival — Apache Junction, Arizona
- Artscape — Baltimore, Maryland
- Bristol Renaissance Faire — Kenosha, Wisconsin
- Carolina Renaissance Festival — Huntersville, North Carolina
- Central Pennsylvania Festival of the Arts — State College, Pennsylvania
- Contemporary American Theater Festival - Shepherdstown, West Virginia
- Curtain Up! — Buffalo, New York
- Grand Cities Art Fest — Grand Forks, North Dakota/East Grand Forks, Minnesota
- Kansas City Renaissance Festival — Bonner Springs, Kansas
- Maryland Renaissance Festival — Crownsville, Maryland
- MasterWorks Festival — Cedarville, Ohio
- Minnesota Renaissance Festival — Shakopee, Minnesota
- New York Renaissance Faire — Tuxedo, New York
- North Carolina School of the Arts Summer Performance Festival — Manteo, North Carolina
- Oregon Shakespeare Festival — Ashland, Oregon
- The River To River Festival — New York, New York
- Savannah Music Festival — Savannah, Georgia
- Sterling Renaissance Festival — Sterling, New York
- True/False Film Festival — Columbia, Missouri
- Utah Shakespearean Festival — Cedar City, Utah

=== Flower festivals ===
- International Cherry Blossom Festival — Macon, Georgia
- Lilac Festival — Rochester, New York
- Lompoc Valley Flower Festival — Lompoc, California
- National Cherry Blossom Festival — Washington, DC
- Philadelphia Flower Show — Philadelphia, Pennsylvania
- Portland Rose Festival — Portland, Oregon
- Seattle Hempfest — Seattle, Washington
- Shenandoah Apple Blossom Festival — Winchester, Virginia
- Texas Rose Festival — Tyler, Texas
- Tulip Festival — Holland, Michigan
- Washington State Apple Blossom Festival — Wenatchee, Washington

=== Food, harvest and wild game festivals ===
- Apple Festival — Bayfield, Wisconsin
- Banana Split Festival — Wilmington, Ohio
- Barnesville Pumpkin Festival — Barnesville, Ohio
- Brushy Mountain Apple Festival — North Wilkesboro, North Carolina
- Circleville Pumpkin Show — Circleville, Ohio
- Delmarva Chicken Festival — Delmarva Peninsula
- Festival of the Fish — Vermilion, Ohio
- Florida food festivals — Florida
- Gilroy Garlic Festival — Gilroy, California
- Half Moon Bay Art and Pumpkin Festival — Half Moon Bay, California
- Jackson County Apple Festival — Jackson, Ohio
- Kentucky Apple Festival — Paintsville, Kentucky
- Lexington Barbecue Festival — Lexington, North Carolina
- Louisiana Fur and Wildlife Festival — Cameron, Louisiana
- Morton Pumpkin Festival — Morton, Illinois
- National Buffalo Wing Festival — Buffalo, New York
- National Cherry Festival — Traverse City, Michigan
- National Cornbread Festival National Cornbread Festival — South Pittsburg, Tennessee
- North Carolina Wine Festival — Clemmons, North Carolina
- Norwalk Oyster Festival — Norwalk, Connecticut
- Parker County Peach Festival — Weatherford, Texas
- Paso Robles Wine Festival — Paso Robles, California
- Roanoke-Chowan Pork-Fest — Murfreesboro, North Carolina
- Schmeckfest — Freeman, South Dakota
- Strawberry Festival — Poteet, Texas
- Sweet Corn Festival — Fairborn, Ohio
- Taste of Buffalo — Buffalo, New York
- Taste of Chicago — Chicago, Illinois
- A Taste of Colorado
- West Side Nut Club Fall Festival — Evansville, Indiana
- West Virginia Hot Dog Festival — Huntington, West Virginia
- Yadkin Valley Wine Festival — Elkin, North Carolina
- Yambilee Festival — Opelousas, Louisiana

=== Holiday festivals ===
- Christmas on the River — Demopolis, Alabama
- New Orleans Mardi Gras — New Orleans, Louisiana
- Spirit of America Festival — Decatur, Alabama
- West Side Nut Club Fall Festival — Evansville, Indiana

=== LGBT festivals ===
- Capital Pride — Washington, DC
- Fantasia Fair — Provincetown, Massachusetts
- Frameline — San Francisco, California
- Newfest — New York, New York
- Outfest — Los Angeles, California
- PeaceOUT World Homo Hop Festival — Oakland, California
- Southern Decadence — New Orleans, Louisiana
- Utah Pride Festival — Salt Lake City, Utah
- White Party — Palm Springs, California

=== Pagan festivals ===
- Faerieworlds — Eugene, Oregon
- Pagan Spirit Gathering — near Salem, Missouri
- Starwood Festival — Wisteria Campground in Pomeroy, Ohio

=== Pioneer festivals ===
- Days of '47 Parade — Salt Lake City, Utah
- Pioneer Days — Kalida, Ohio
- Pioneer Days — Utah state holiday with multiple celebrations throughout the state

=== Religious festivals ===
- Vaisakhi — Yuba City, California
- Wild Goose Festival — Hot Springs, North Carolina
- X-Day (Church of the SubGenius) — Wisteria Campground in Pomeroy, Ohio

=== Rodeo and horse racing festivals ===
- Days of '47 Rodeo — Salt Lake City, Utah
- Houston Livestock Show and Rodeo — Houston, Texas
- Kentucky Derby Festival — Louisville, Kentucky

=== Science festivals ===
- Trenton Computer Festival
- World Science Festival — New York, New York

=== Seasonal festivals ===
- Apple Blossom Festival — Winchester, Virginia
- Evansville Freedom Festival — Evansville, Indiana
- Memphis in May — Memphis, Tennessee
- Sawdust Art Festival — Laguna Beach, California
- Three Rivers Festival — Fort Wayne, Indiana
- West Side Nut Club Fall Festival — Evansville, Indiana
- Woollybear Festival — Vermilion, Ohio

=== Sports festivals ===
- Arnold Sports Festival — Columbus, Ohio
- Bridge Day — Fayetteville, West Virginia

=== Storytelling festivals ===
- National Storytelling Festival — Jonesborough, Tennessee
- Southern Ohio Storytelling Festival — Chillicothe, Ohio
- Timpanogos Storytelling Festival — Orem, Utah

=== Transportation festivals ===
- Segway Fest — varying locations
- Tall Stacks — Cincinnati, Ohio

== See also ==
- Culture of the United States
- Public holidays in the United States
- Tourism in the United States
- Tourist attractions in the United States
