= Portland Polish Festival =

Annual event in Portland, Oregon, U.S.

- Logo
- Status: Active
- Frequency: Annually
- Location: Portland, Oregon
- Country: United States
- Website: polishfestivalpdx.org

The Portland Polish Festival is an annual festival in Portland, Oregon, United States. It is the "largest and longest-running Polish cultural festival in the Pacific Northwest", according to KATU. As many as 10,000 people attend the two-day event, which started as an annual dinner at St. Stanislaus Church.

The festival features dancing, music (including polka), performances, and Polish cuisine. There are also exhibits about Polish culture and history. The Portland Mercury has said the event "is hands-down one of the best outdoor shindigs of the year".

== History ==
The 2020 and 2021 events were cancelled because of the COVID-19 pandemic. The 2022 event was also cancelled.

== See also ==
- Culture of Portland, Oregon
- List of festivals in the United States
