= List of festivals in Georgia (U.S. state) =

Festivals of Georgia
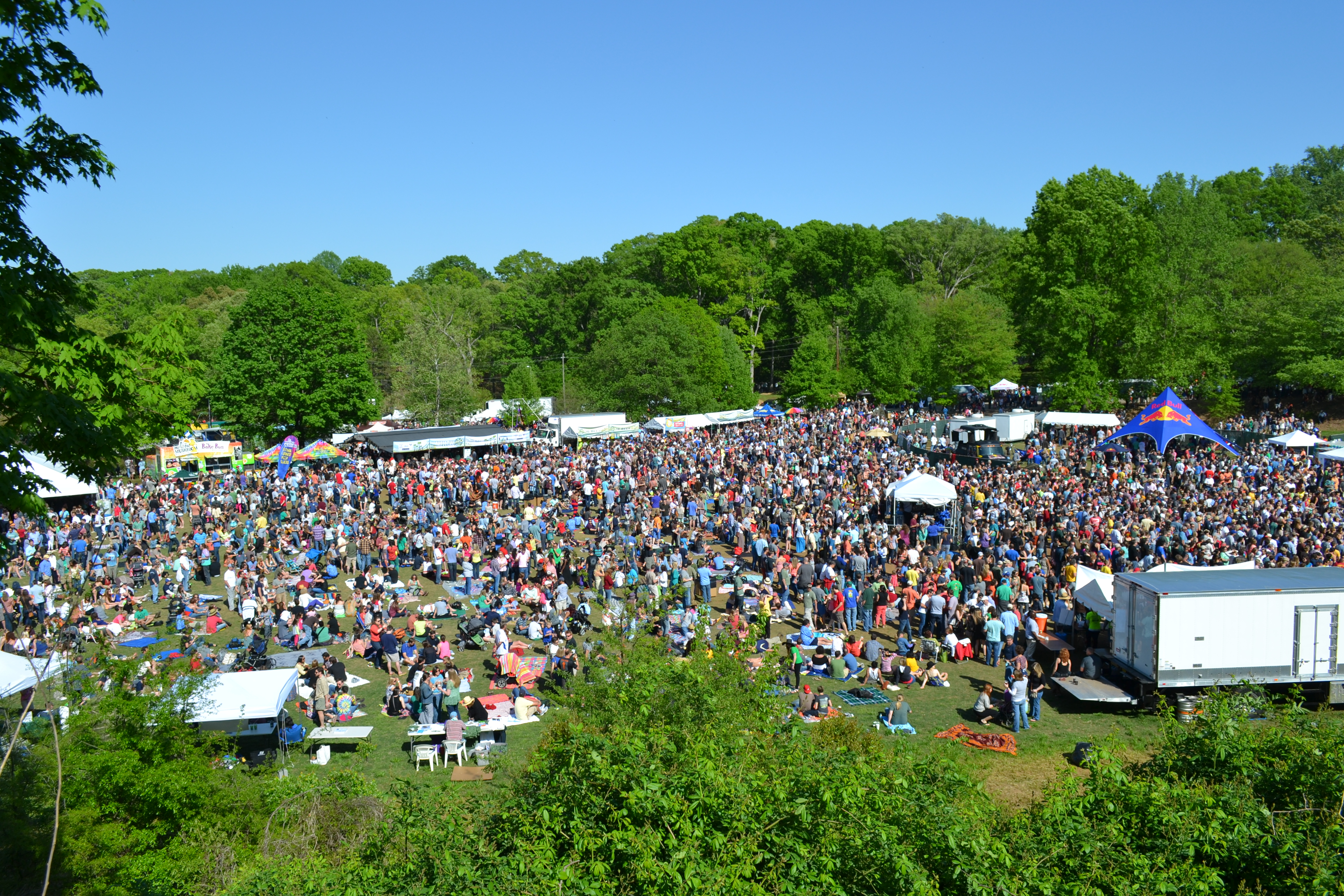

External sublists
- By city: Festivals of Atlanta

Related topics
- Festivals of the United States; lists of festivals by state or region (American Samoa; Florida; Guam; Hawaii; Louisiana; Michigan; New Jersey; Pennsylvania; Puerto Rico; United States Virgin Islands; Virginia); culture of Georgia; tourism in Georgia

This is a list of festivals in Georgia.

== By type ==
=== General ===
- Athfest — Athens
- Atlanta Dogwood Festival — Atlanta
- Big Pig Jig — Vienna
- Big Shanty Festival — Kennesaw
- The Great Locomotive Chase Festival — Adairsville
- Marble Festival — Jasper
- Yellow Daisy Festival — Stone Mountain

=== Cultural ===
- Georgia Renaissance Festival — near Fairburn
- International Cherry Blossom Festival — Macon

=== Film ===
- Atlanta Film Festival — Atlanta
- Atlanta Jewish Film Festival — Atlanta

=== Folk ===
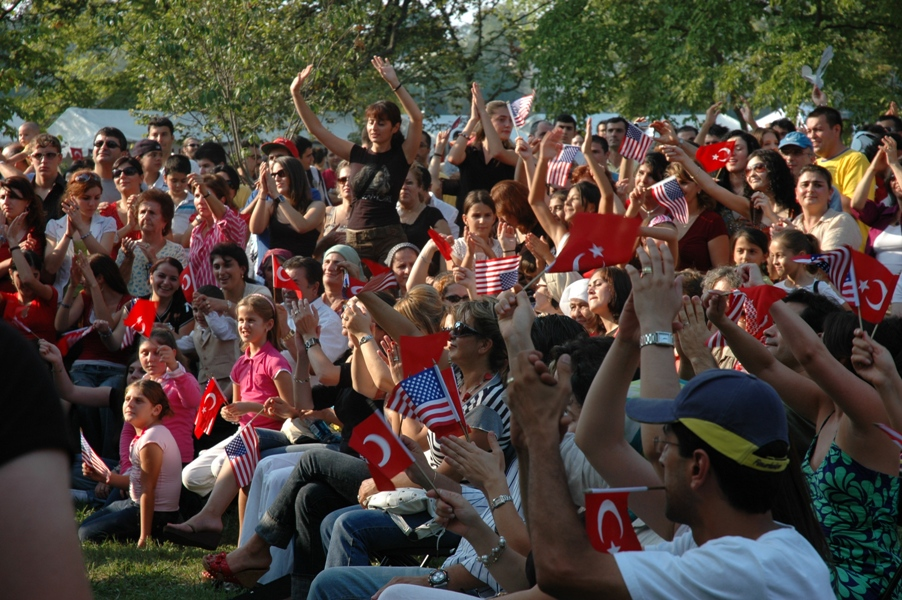
Atlanta Turkish Festival 2007

- Georgia Apple Festival — Ellijay

=== Music ===
- ProgPower USA — Atlanta
- Snellville Days Festival — Snellville

== See also ==
- List of festivals in the United States
