= Mayfest =

Mayfest may refer to several annual events:

== United Kingdom ==
- Mayfest (Bristol), a theatre festival in Bristol, England
- Mayfest, a festival held in Glasgow, Scotland 1983-1997
- Notting Hill Mayfest, hosted by St John's, Notting Hill, London, England

== United States ==
- Fort Worth Mayfest, in Fort Worth, Texas
- Mayfest, in Perryville, Missouri
- Tulsa International Mayfest, in Tulsa, Oklahoma
- Mayfest, in Huntingdon, Pennsylvania

== Other countries ==
- Maifest, a German spring celebration
- Mayfest, at Bilkent University, Ankara, Turkey
