= Oregon Midsummer Festival =

Annual event in Portland, Oregon, U.S.

- Logo
- Location: Portland, Oregon
- Country: United States
- Organiser: Nordic Northwest
- Website: oregonmidsummer.com

The Oregon Midsummer Festival is an annual festival in Portland, Oregon, United States. The solstice celebration is organized by Nordic Northwest and features crafts, Nordic cuisine, games, music, and other activities such as crown making and maypole decorating. Brianna Wheeler of Willamette Week has described the Midsummer event as "a deeply embedded Portland summer tradition featuring a massive array of Nordic vendors and organizations from across the Pacific Northwest". The 2020 and 2021 events were cancelled because of the COVD-19 pandemic.

== See also ==
- Culture of Portland, Oregon
- List of festivals in the United States
