= Fall Festival =

Fall Festival may refer to any festival during the fall season, such as:

- Autumnfest
- Mid-Autumn Festival
- West Side Nut Club Fall Festival
