= Jason Feddy =

British singer/songwriter (born 1966)

- Feddy in 2019

Background information
- Born: Jason Edward Feddy; 22 February 1966 (age 60); Leeds, Yorkshire, England
- Origin: Harrogate, Yorkshire, England
- Genres: rock; pop; blues; folk
- Occupations: singer; songwriter
- Instrument: guitar
- Years active: 1981–present
- Website: www.jasonfeddy.com

Jason Edward Feddy (born 22 February 1966) is an English musician who became a U.S. citizen in 2010, and now lives in Southern California. In addition his solo career as a singer/songwriter, Feddy has fronted several bands, as well as writing and performing for television, movies, and the stage.

== Career ==
Feddy was born in the city of Leeds, Yorkshire, England. He left school at 16 and later formed the rock 'n roll band Officer Dibble, which he fronted as a singer and guitarist. In 1984 he became lead singer of his first professional band, "Soft Target," working men's clubs in the UK's North East and touring Norway. Going solo as a singer/songwriter soon thereafter, he spent the next couple of decades touring and making albums. Feddy has been featured in the London-based Time Out (magazine) and on the cover of the Classic Rock Society journal. He has toured in Europe regularly and has written songs for theater, television and film.

== Mad Dogs & The Englishman ==
In the summer of 2018 Feddy debuted his Joe Cocker tribute band, "Mad Dogs & The Englishman". Along with Jason as lead singer (who had in years past toured with Joe Cocker), the band features an all-star lineup of musicians including John Troy on bass, Ray Weston on drums, Richard Bredice on guitar, Dave Witham on keyboards, Jimmy 'Z' Zavala on saxophone, and "The Chick" back-up singers: Pat Hawk, Janis Leibhart, and Lori Mark-Heingold.

== Beatroots Band ==
The Beatroots band was formed by Feddy in the spring of 2006 in response to a request from Laguna Beach's Festival of Arts (see Pageant of the Masters or Sawdust Art Festival). They play the songs of The Beatles, without costume, in their own style, staying close to the original with light improvisation.

The Beatroots are: Jason Feddy (lead vocals and guitar); Geoff Perlman (vocals/guitars); John Troy (vocals/bass) and Evan Stone (drums).

== 133 Band ==
In 2014 Laguna Beach resident Clay Berryhill gathered eight local musicians, including Feddy as guitar player and singer, to create a new band modeled after the Traveling Wilburys, called the 133 Band. In addition to Feddy, the 133 Band features Beth Fitchett-Wood (guitar & vocals), Steve Wood (keyboards & vocals) Poul Pedersen (guitar & vocals), Bob Hawkins (lead guitar), Alan Deremo (bass), Nick Hernandez (ukulele, guitar & vocals), and Drew Hester (drums).

The 133 Band made its debut by opening for The Beach Boys at the Irvine Bowl. It has also self-produced an EP, a CD, and a documentary film about the making of the band and its members.

== Theater, television, film ==
In 2018, Feddy wrote fourteen original songs for the play Two's a Crowd, including the single "If Only." The musical comedy, written and produced by award-winning comedienne Rita Rudner and her British producer husband Martin Bergman, opened at the Laguna Playhouse in September 2018, starring Rita Rudner and The Phantom of the Opera's Davis Gaines. Feddy also served as musical director for the opening run. The show opened a six-week off-Broadway run in New York City during the summer of 2019, with Feddy also appearing onstage and singing. A review by The New York Times described Feddy's show persona as "rumpled charm."

In 2017 Feddy co-narrated the short film Everything Laguna Beach.

Feddy has written and performed songs for the Mary-Kate and Ashley Olsen TV series So Little Time, feature film Divorce Invitation (starring Paul Sorvino & Elliott Gould), and soundtrack for the documentary film "Home Again."

== Shakespeare's Fool ==
In the spring of 2010, Feddy and his band met with local performance poet, actor and teacher John Gardiner, to develop a performance piece of Shakespeare's songs with modern, acoustic based tunes combined with speeches from Shakespeare's plays.

The result is called Shakespeare's Fool, featuring ten songs and ten speeches from the Shakespeare canon accompanied by performance art by Feddy's actress wife, Ava Burton. Feddy recorded the songs with his friends and musical collaborators David J. Carpenter (bass) and Bryan Head (drums).

Feddy also has performed Shakespeare's Fool live at local venues. His songs were used in the 2018 Bares Bones Theater production of In Search of Silvia, Or What Goes Awry When Fools Fall in Love, by Lojo Simon.

== Cantor ==
Feddy is a fluent Hebrew speaker and performs many popular and ceremonial songs. He has served the resident Cantor at Temple Isaiah in Newport Beach. He has also appeared at Temple Beth in San Diego, Temple West in La Jolla, Chabad of Laguna Beach, and Beth Hamidrash in the United Kingdom.

In 2016 Feddy teamed up with Rabbi-Cantor Marcia Tilchin, founder of The Jewish Collaborative of Orange County, to host a monthly musical Kabbalat Shabbat service.

== Venues/other artists ==
Over the years Feddy has played at various venues throughout the United Kingdom, Europe, the United States and Middle East, including the Royal Albert Hall in London, the London Palladium, Wembley Stadium, Glastonbury Festival, Harrogate Blues Bar, Laguna Beach Festival of the Arts, Laguna Beach Sawdust Art Festival, The Tudor House Theatre in Lake Arrowhead, Jacob's Ladder Festival in Israel, Chilkat Center for the Arts in Alaska, and the Blue Water Music Festival in Laguna Beach. Feddy has also appeared on MTV.

== Laguna Playhouse ==
Feddy served as co-host for the sold out Laguna Concert Band featuring Lee Rocker at the Laguna Beach Playhouse.

In December 2017, 2018, and 2019, Feddy appeared at the Playhouse with the performance art group The Skivvies, performing stripped-down versions of eclectic covers, wacky holiday mash-ups and eccentric originals.

== Community service ==
Feddy has been involved in community service and support of charitable organizations. He has played the Blue Water Concert to Help Save Trestles, the InPerson Social Media fundraiser for Earthroots Field School, appeared at the Home Aid OC's Annual Project Playhouse Dinner & Auction to benefit for the homeless, and been featured at the Friendship Shelter Annual Gala, among others.

Feddy spearheaded bringing the Music in Common program to Orange County (a two-day event which brings together high school age Jews, Christians, and Muslims to learn how to exchange ideas with mutual respect, collaborate, and work together towards a common goal through the process of writing a song). In 2018 Feddy became the Southern California regional coordinator for Music in Common.

== Other ==
Feddy's chance encounter with British presenter, writer, journalist, and BBC television personality Richard Hammond is memorialized in Hammond's 2013 biography On the Road: Growing up in Eight Journeys-My Early Years (Weidenfeld & Nicolson, ISBN 978-02978-6943-6): "Jason Feddy was incredible. An affable sort of a guy with a soft, reedy speaking voice bearing a distinct Northern twang, he relaxed and laughed with us. His long wavy hair under a stylish baker-boy cap atop an impossibly loud shirt signaled that her was a guy for whom his music was everything. He was a pro and we were there to learn."

English author, musician and screenwriter Jeremy Dyson (an acquaintance of Feddy's wife) uses the name "Jason Feddy" to represent a fictional character in his short story entitled "A Visit From Val Koran", appearing in the collection of short stories published in 2000 entitled Never Trust A Rabbit (Duck Editions, ISBN 0715630970).

== Awards ==
In 2016, Feddy received the Laguna "Hero Fest" music hero award for his work with Music in Common.

In 2017, Feddy was recognized as a "Local Luminary" by Laguna Beach Magazine, an annual list of creators, champions and change-makers who have made a significant impact—near and far.

In 2017, Feddy was named the "Best of Laguna Beach" in a poll conducted by local radio station 93.5 FM.

In 2019, Feddy was named "Artist of the Year" by the Laguna Beach Arts Alliance.

== Personal life ==
Feddy attended Leeds' Morris Silman Middle School in the United Kingdom, which provided a rounded Jewish and secular education and Bar-Mitzvah training. Feddy and his family were longstanding members of one of the many local synagogues. Feddy was a member of the school and synagogue choirs. Active for all of his childhood years in the Kibbutz oriented youth movement (Habonim Dror), Feddy was raised to the soundtrack of Jewish music, both ancient and modern. His mother is an active member of various amateur choirs and liturgical singing groups.

Feddy graduated from Allerton High School, Leeds, United Kingdom, in 1982. Later he attended Manchester College, Manchester, United Kingdom, 1997–1998; and thereafter attended the University of Manchester, Manchester, United Kingdom, 1998–1999.

In 2010, Feddy married classically trained actress Ava Burton, in Israel on Kibbutz Tuval, under a chuppah overlooking the Galilean hills. They make their home in Aliso Viejo.
