= List of festivals in Virginia =

The following is an incomplete list of festivals in Virginia.

== Festivals ==
- Anime Mid-Atlantic
- Castleton Festival
- Celebrate Fairfax!
- Celebrate Literacy and Arts in the Park (April 23rd in Orange, VA)
- The Daffodil Festival
- Highland County Maple Festival
- International Children's Festival at Wolf Trap
- Nekocon
- Neptune Festival
- RavenCon
- Shenandoah Apple Blossom Festival
- Tephra Fine Arts Festival
- Upperville Colt & Horse Show
- Virginia Arts Festival
- DJ Skyhigh End Of Summer Blast

=== Film ===
- Redemptive Film Festival
- The Spooky Movie Film Festival
- VCU French Film Festival
- Virginia Film Festival

=== Music ===
- All Good Music Festival
- Bristol Rhythm & Roots Reunion
- Buskerfest
- FloydFest
- Hampton Jazz Festival
- Lockn' Festival
- Shenandoah Valley Music Festival

Month	Festival name	Location	Genre
June	Shaggfest	Virginia Beach	Hip hop, pop, and EDM

=== Food ===
Month	Festival name	Location	Food
July	Pork, Peanut, and Pine Festival	Surry County	Pork, peanuts
May	Pungo Strawberry Festival	Virginia Beach	Strawberries
May	Taste of Arlington	Arlington	General restaurant cuisine
September	Charlottesville Vegan Roots Fest	Charlottesville	Vegan cuisine
