= List of festivals and events in Tulsa, Oklahoma =

This is a list of festivals and events in the U.S. state of Tulsa, Oklahoma:

== Cultural ==
- Black Buggy Day - September, just east of Tulsa in Choteau
- Brookside ARTZZ - Peoria in September 23; jazz and art
- ChristKindlMarkt
- Conestoga - literary science fiction and fantasy convention held every July
- Festival Hispano - September
- Greek Holiday Festival
- Green Country Eco-Expo & One Love Music Fest
- Harvest Moon Festival - arts, crafts, gifts, and food; October
- I AM Yoga, Art + Music Festival - September
- Jenks Art On Main - October
- Oklahoma Chautauqua - historical tourism; free to the public; held each June on the campus of OSU-Tulsa
- Oklahoma Indian Summer Festival - September, just north of Tulsa in Bartlesville
- Pow-wow of Champions
- SCOTFEST - third weekend of every September
- ShalomFest
- Tokyo, OK (formerly Tokyo in Tulsa) - anime convention held every July
- Tulsa Indian Art Festival
- Tulsa Oktoberfest
- Tulsa Pride Festival
- Utsav India Fest - September, at the Pavilion at Expo Square

== Film ==
- BareBones International Independent Film and Music Festival
- Red Dirt Film Festival
- Red Fork Film Festival (aka Red Fork Native American Film Festival)
- Sunny Side Up Film Festival
- Tonkawa Film Festival
- Tulsa Overground Film and Music Festival
- Tulsa United Film Festival

== Music ==
- Backwoods Bash Music and Camping Festival - Stroud, Oklahoma, halfway between Tulsa and Oklahoma City
- Bluegrass and Chili Festival
- Brookside ARTZZ - Peoria; September; jazz and art
- CrawFest - held annually on the Saturday following Mothers' Day in May; Cajun cuisine and music
- Diversafest Music Conference & Festival (now defunct)
- EvoFest Music, Crafts, and Sustainability Festival - May
- Fall Fest - Flyin' W Ranch in Broken Arrow, Oklahoma; second weekend in November
- Free Tulsa Music Festival - outdoor music event in Downtown Tulsa
- Hound Dog Blues Festival - in west Tulsa's Chandler Park, in September
- Jazz on Greenwood Festival
- Juneteenth Blues and Jazz Festival
- Reggaefest Green Country Eco-Expo & One Love Music Fest - July, at Jenks Riverwalk Crossing
- Rocklahoma
- Rock n' Rib Festival - hosted by the BOK Center; September
- Wunderfest - multiple stages for music; arts; food; August; River West Festival Park in Tulsa

== Seasonal ==
- Blue Dome Arts Festival - May
- Brush Creek Bazaar - October 11–13
- Castle Christmas - at the Castle of Muskogee; features over 2000 holiday inflatables; open Thanksgiving through New Year's Eve, 6pm-10pm
- ChristKindlMarkt - first weekend in December
- Christmas light display - Rhema Bible Church in Broken Arrow, Oklahoma, featuring over a million lights and props
- During Tulsa Summers
- Fall Fest at the Flyin' W Ranch in Broken Arrow, Oklahoma - second weekend in November
- Gay Pride - in June, sponsored by Oklahomans for Equality
- Halloween Festival - at the Castle of Muskogee; every Friday and Saturday in October
- Tulsa International Mayfest - May
- Oklahoma Renaissance Festival - at the Castle of Muskogee; every weekend in May
- Oktoberfest - October
- PSO Christmas Parade of Lights
- Psycho Path Haunted Attraction - 40 acres; Dark Ride; Shadow Box
- Tails and Tornadoes Furcon - Furry Convention in September
- Wunderfest Wunderfest - annual music, arts and food festival in August
- Tulsa State Fair - end of September

== Food ==
Many of the cultural and seasonal events feature a variety of specialty foods, such as ethnic foods of German and Scottish origin.

- Art of BBQ - downtown Tulsa, in September
- ChristKindlMarkt - bratwurst, strudel
- Food Truck Festival - Tulsa's Air and Space Museum - September
- Harvest Beer Festival - downtown Tulsa, in September
- Rock n' Rib Festival - hosted by the BOK Center; September
- First Draft Craft Beer Tasting - hosted by Tulsa Press Club - November

Other notable food-specific events in Tulsa and the surrounding area include:

- Bixby Corn Festival - Bixby, Oklahoma
- Porter Peach Festival - Porter, Oklahoma
