= A Taste of Colorado =

Annual festival in Denver, Colorado

- Genre: Food festival
- Frequency: Annually
- Venue: Civic Center Park
- Location: Denver, Colorado
- Major events: Food vendors, Live music, Interactive exhibits

A Taste of Colorado is a free, three-day outdoor festival held annually in Downtown Denver's Civic Center Park on Labor Day weekend, as the Festival of Mountain and Plain, a celebration of pioneer days, was around the turn of the 20th century. It is produced by and benefits Downtown Denver Events, Inc., a non-profit organization of the Downtown Denver Partnership that produces community and cultural events.

Typically drawing over 500,000 visitors a year, A Taste of Colorado includes over 50 booths operated by local food establishments. The event also features four music stages, arts and crafts vendors, kids' activities, and interactive exhibits.

== History ==
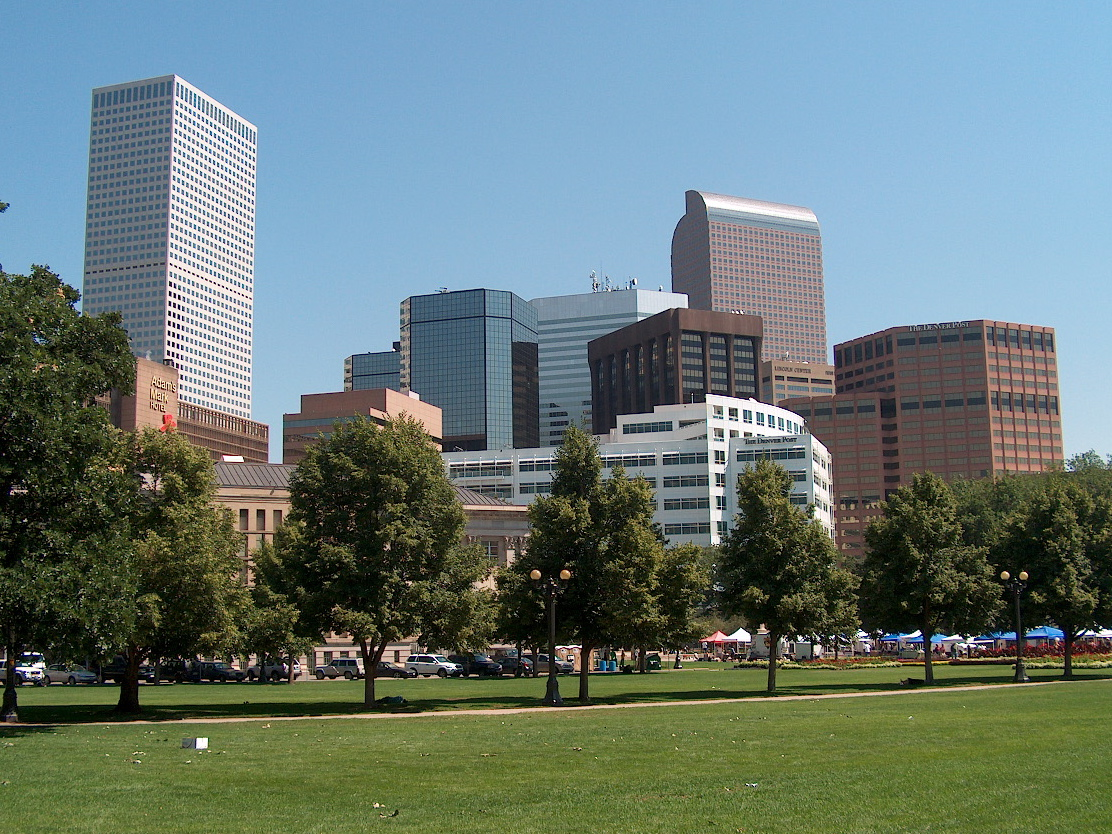
A Taste of Colorado Festival, is hosted at Civic Center Park Downtown Denver

In 1895, the festival was originally named Festival of Mountain and Plain. The festival started as a carnival similar to New Orleans’ Mardi Gras. The goal of the carnival was to boost the city's morale and vitality after the Silver Panic. The festival was ultimately unsuccessful in ending Denver's economic depression. After a decline in attendance the carnival ended in 1902 . In 1983, the Downtown Denver Partnership decided to bring back the spirit of the original Festival to commemorate the opening of the 16th Street Mall. "A Taste of Colorado" was added to the Festival of Mountain and Plain name and concept and moved back to Civic Center Park in Downtown Denver, where the event first began.
