= List of festivals in Buffalo, New York =

Like many large cities, numerous festivals have become part of the Buffalo's culture and tradition. Though most of the festivals occur during the summer months, the city has recently pushed to have winter festivals as well, in an effort to capitalize on the region's snowy reputation.

== Summer festivals ==
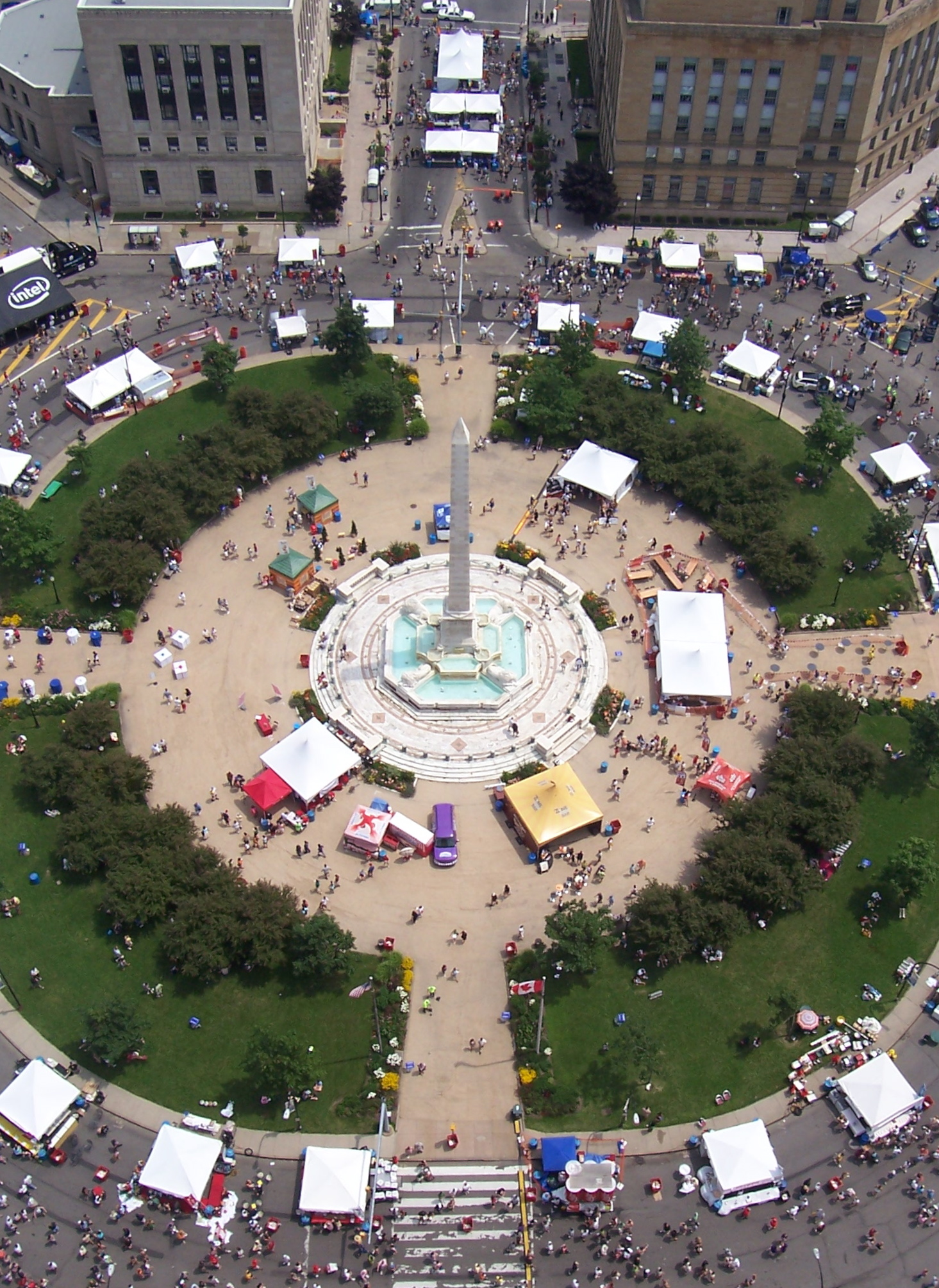
Taste of Buffalo at Niagara Square

- Allentown Art Festival – largest festival of the year; held on the second weekend of June in the Allentown neighborhood
- The BASH – military-themed fundraiser; proceeds go towards vital disaster preparedness education and response in Western New York communities
- Buffalo Brewfest
- Buffalo Gay Pride Festival
- Buffalo Greek Festival
- Buffalo Niagara Blues Festival
- Curtain Up! – marks the beginning of the Buffalo theater season
- Dożynki Polish Harvest Festival
- Elmwood Avenue Festival of the Arts
- Friendship Festival – joint festival with Fort Erie, Ontario celebrating Canada–United States relations
- Italian Festival
- Juneteenth Festival – annual celebration of the freedom of slaves
- Music is Art Festival
- National Buffalo Wing Festival
- Nickel City Con – Upstate NY's largest comic book & pop culture festival held annually in May at the Buffalo Niagara Convention Center
- Taste of Buffalo – one of the largest outdoor food festivals in the country
- Thursday at the Square – weekly outdoor summer concert series on Thursday evenings during the summer and fall

== Fall festivals ==
- Buffalo International Film Festival
- Western New York Family Fall Festival at Everhaunt Haunted Attraction

== Winter festivals ==
- Buffalo Ball Drop
- Buffalo Powder Keg Festival
- Dyngus Day Buffalo
- Labatt Blue Pond Hockey
- Saint Patrick's Day Parades – In addition to the parade held in the downtown area on a Sunday either before or after March 17, the "Old Neighborhood" parade is held the day before in the southern part of Buffalo, which is heavily populated by ethnic Irish residents and where the first parades were originally held.
- World's Largest Disco
