= Veterans United Home Loans Amphitheater =

Amphitheater in Virginia Beach, Virginia

Veterans United Home Loans Amphitheater at Virginia Beach
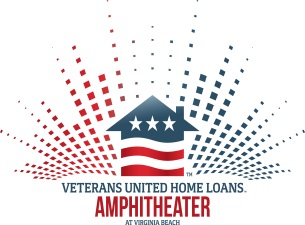
- Logo for 2016 Venue Rebranding
- Interactive map of Veterans United Home Loans Amphitheater at Virginia Beach
- Former names: Virginia Beach Amphitheater (1996, 2010–2011); GTE Virginia Beach Amphitheater (1996–2005); Verizon Wireless Amphitheater at Virginia Beach (2005–2010); Farm Bureau Live at Virginia Beach (2011–2015)
- Address: 3550 Cellar Door Way
- Location: Virginia Beach, Virginia
- Coordinates: 36°46′07.60″N 76°06′10.65″W
- Operator: Live Nation Entertainment
- Seating type: Reserved and lawn seating
- Capacity: 20,000
- Type: Outdoor amphitheater

Construction
- Opened: 1996

Website
- www.livenation.com

Veterans United Home Loans Amphitheater at Virginia Beach, formerly known as GTE Virginia Beach Amphitheater, is a 20,000-seat outdoor concert venue, located in Virginia Beach, Virginia.

== History ==
The amphitheater opened in 1996, with 7,500 seats, under a pavilion and 12,500 general admission lawn seats, and since then, due to its size and target audience, has hosted concerts by large names in the music industry. In March 2010, the venue removed its corporate prefix ("Verizon Wireless") for the first time in its 14-year history, to be known simply as "Virginia Beach Amphitheater". In February 2011, the amphitheater was renamed "Farm Bureau Live at Virginia Beach", with naming rights coming from Virginia Farm Bureau Insurance. In January 2016, it was announced that the venue would be renamed "Veterans United Home Loans Amphitheater at Virginia Beach."

The amphitheater has five dedicated adjacent parking lots, and parking fees are included in ticket prices for most shows. The facility has two main seating areas; the main fixed seating area beneath a pavilion roof and a lawn area behind the fixed seating and partially covered by the pavilion. The facility rents small lawn chairs for patrons who have purchased lawn seats and allows concert-goers to bring blankets.

== Events ==
The amphitheater has played host to many music festivals, including Shaggfest, Crüe Fest, Crüe Fest 2, FM99 Lunatic Luau, H.O.R.D.E. Festival, Honda Civic Tour, Lilith Fair, Lollapalooza, Mayhem Festival, Ozzfest, Projekt Revolution, Uproar Festival and Vans Warped Tour.

The Dave Matthews Band performed and recorded their show, on June 4, 1996, which was later released as a live album, entitled Live Trax Vol. 18.

The Spice Girls performed a sold-out show on their Spiceworld Tour on June 24, 1998.

Phish commemorated the third anniversary of Grateful Dead guitarist Jerry Garcia's passing on August 9, 1998, with their first and only performance of the Grateful Dead song "Terrapin Station".

Aerosmith were scheduled to perform during their Just Push Play Tour on September 11, 2001, with Fuel as their opening act, but the show was cancelled due to the 9/11 terrorist attacks; during their Honkin' on Bobo Tour on June 16, 2004, with Cheap Trick as their opening act, but the show was cancelled; and due to illness and during their Aerosmith/ZZ Top Tour on July 5, 2009, with ZZ Top as their opening act, but the show was cancelled, due to injuries sustained by frontman Steven Tyler.

P.O.D. also filmed the music video for their song "Satellite" on July 21, 2002, during the FM99 Lunatic Luau. They played the song 3 times with cameras rolling to make sure they had all of the footage they needed.

Bruce Springsteen performed a show on April 12, 2014, during the High Hopes Tour for a crowd of 15,157 people.

Rod Stewart performed a show on August 1, 2026 as part of his One Last Time retirement tour.

See also

- List of contemporary amphitheaters
