= List of festivals in Utah =

This is a list of festivals in Utah.

== List ==
List of Festivals In Utah
Festival	Location	Theme	Years Active in Utah	Month	Status	Ref
Utah Pride	Salt Lake City	LGBTQ+	1997-	June	Active	
Sundance Film Festival	Salt Lake City, Park City	Film	1978-2026	January	Relocated	
Bear Lake Raspberry Days	Garden City	Harvest		August	Active	
Black & White Days	Richmond	City	1912-	May	Active	
Summerfest Arts Faire	Logan	City		June	Active	
Pony Express Days	Clarkson	City		June	Active	
Pioneer Day	North Logan	State Holiday	1908-	July	Active	
Peach Days	Brigham City	Harvest	1904-	September	Active	
South Ogden Days	South Ogden	City		June	Active	
Freedom Festival	Farr West	City		June-July	Active	
Cherry Days	North Ogden	Harvest/City	1932-	July	Active	
Independence Day Celebration	Huntsville	Federal Holiday		July	Active	
Roy Days	Roy	City		July-August	Active	
Heritage Days	Syracuse			June		
Farmington Festival Days	Farmington			July		
Clearfield 4th of July Events	Clearfield	Federal Holiday		July		
Party at the Point	West Point			July		
Layton FEST	Layton			July-August		
SoJo SummerFest	South Jordan			June		
WestFest	West Valley City			June		
Fort Herriman Days	Herriman			June		
Taylorsville Dayzz	Taylorsville			June		
Riverton Town Days	Riverton			June-July		
West Jordan Western Stampede	West Jordan			July		
Draper Days	Draper			July		
Butlerville Days	Cottonwood Heights			July		
Days of 47	Salt Lake City			July		
Harvest Days	Midvale			July-August		
Old West Days	Bluffdale			July-August		
Sandy Balloon Festival	Sandy			August		
Sandy Heritage Festival	Sandy			September		
Tooele Arts Festival	Tooele			June		
4th of July Celebration	Tooele	Federal Holiday		June-July		
Kamas Valley Fiesta Days	Kamas			July		
4th of July Celebration	Oakley	Federal Holiday		June-July		
Park City 4th of July Events	Park City	Federal Holiday		July		
Frontier Days	Francis					
Pony Express Days	Eagle Mountain			May		
Vineyard Days	Vineyard			June		
Family Festival	Cedar Hills			May-June		
Oremfest	Orem			June		
Art City Days	Springville			June		
Saratoga Splash	Saratoga Springs			June		
Lehi Round-Up	Lehi			June		
Freedom Festival	Provo			June-July		
Steel Days	American Fork			July		
Scottish Festival	Payson			July		
Mosquito Days	Goshen			July		
Fiesta Days	Spanish Fork			July		
Highland Fling	Highland			July-August		
Springville World Foldfest	Springville, Orem			July-August		
Orchard Days	Santaquin					
Lindon Days	Lindon			August		
Alpine Days	Alpine			August		
Payson Golden Onion Days	Payson			September		
Altamont Longhorn Days	Altamont			July		
Dinosaurland Freedom Fest	Vernal			July		
Swiss Days	Midway			September		
Scandinavian Heritage Festival	Ephraim			May		
Spring City Heritage Day	Spring City			May		
Hub City Days	Mt. Pleasant			July		
Lamb Days	Fountain Green			July		
Pioneer Days	Fairview			July		
Pleasant Valley Days	Scofield			July		
International Days	Price			August		
Melon Days	Green River			September		
Eyes to the Sky Balloon Festival	Salina			June		
Panguitch Valley Balloon Ralley	Panguitch			June		
Peach Days	Hurricane			September		
Swiss Days	Santa Clara			September		
Utah Shakespeare Festival	Cedar City	Theater	1962-	June-October		
Deer Valley Music Festival	Park City	Music	2003-	July-August		
Festival Latinoamericano	Provo					
Kilby Block Party	Salt Lake City	Music	2019-	May		
Festival of Lights	Spanish Fork			December		
Utah Pasifika Festival	Provo		2010-			
Balloons and Tunes Roundup Festival	Kanab	Balloon				
Southern Utah Wild Horse & Burro Festival	Hurricane			September		
Magic on the Sidewalk/Bountiful Chalk Art Festival	Bountiful	Art			Active	
Utah Arts Festival	Salt Lake City	Art, Music	1976-	June	Active	
Dark Arts Festival of Utah	Salt Lake City	Music	1993-1994, 2001-			
Urban Arts Festival	Salt Lake City	Art	2010-	August	Active	
Jewish Arts Festival	Salt Lake City	Art		Previously November, Currently October	Active	
Great Salt Lake Fringe Festival	Salt Lake City					
Living Traditions Festival	Salt Lake City					
Earth Jam	Salt Lake City					
Live Green SLC!	Salt Lake City					
Craft Lake City DIY Festival	Salt Lake City					
9th and 9th Street Festival	Salt Lake City					
Ganesh Chathurthi	Salt Lake City					
India Fest	Salt Lake City					
Festival of Colors	Salt Lake City					
Salt Lake City Pagan Pride	Salt Lake City					
Steamfest	Salt Lake City					
Ferragosto	Salt Lake City					
Greek Festival	Salt Lake City			August		
Festa Italian	Salt Lake City			September		
Peruvian Festival	Salt Lake City					
Utah Brazilian Festival	Salt Lake City					
Polynesian Cultural Festival	Salt Lake City					
Nihon Matsuri Japanese Festival	Salt Lake City					
Buddhist Obon Japanese Festival	Salt Lake City					
Slamdunk Film Festival	Park City	Film	1998-2003		Inactive	
Slumdance Film Festival	Park City	Film	1997-2000		Inactive	
Nodance Film Festival	Park City	Film			Inactive	
TromaDance Film Festival	Park City, Salt Lake City	Film	1999-2009	January	Relocated	

== Gallery ==
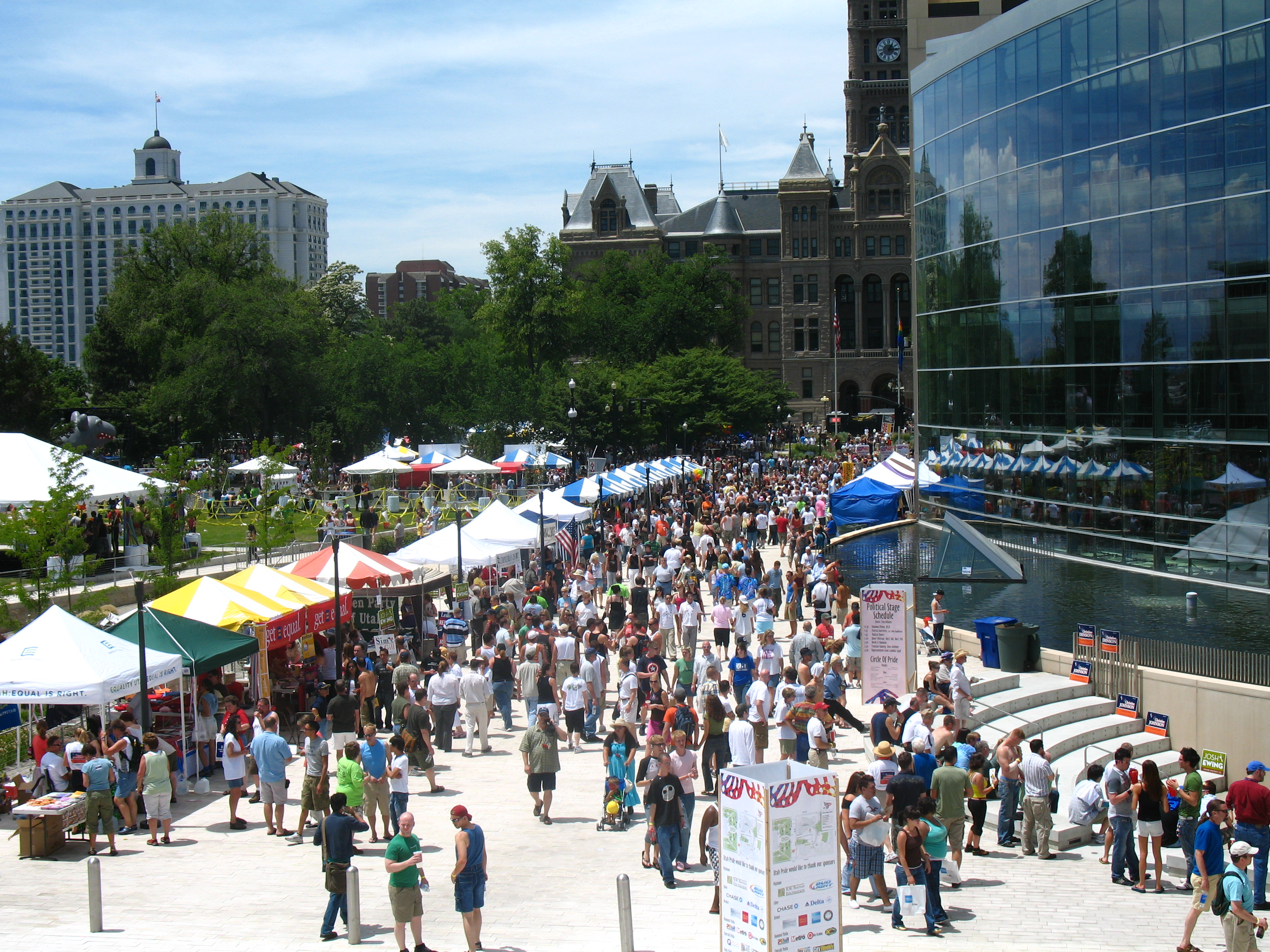
Utah Pride 2006
