= Shaggfest =

Coordinates: 36.769°N 76.103°W

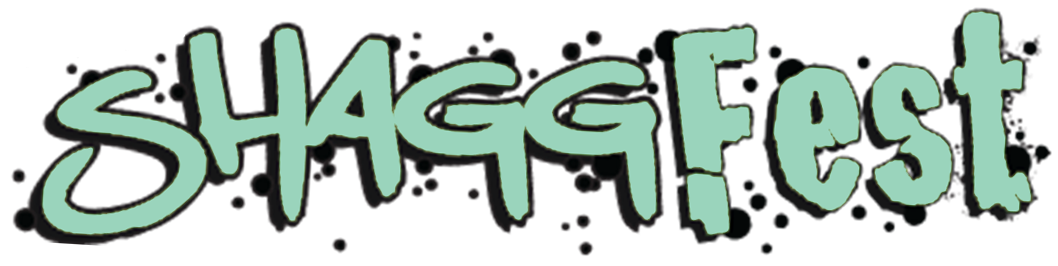
- Pharrell Williams performing at Shaggfest in 2014
- Genre: Pop, hip hop, indie, EDM
- Locations: Virginia Beach, Virginia; United States
- Years active: 2011–2019, 2021–
- Founders: Brandon Stokes
- Website: shaggfest.com

Shaggfest is an annual outdoor music festival held in Virginia Beach, Virginia, USA. It is presented by the Virginia-based radio station Z104 in partnership with Live Nation Entertainment. The event features many genres of music, including pop, hip hop indie and electronic dance music. Shaggfest has two stages where national and established musical artists, as well as local artists perform for fans.

== Background ==
Shaggfest was founded by Brandon Stokes, also known as the radio personality and Virginia Beach local Shaggy, in 2011. It takes place in Virginia Beach, within Tidewater, the southeast area of Virginia. The festival is hosted at the Veterans United Home Loans Amphitheater, which seats approximately 20,000 people.

== Line-ups by year ==
=== 2011 ===
- Skillz
- Audra The Rapper
- Petey Pablo
- MIMS
- Nickelus F

=== 2012 ===
Shaggfest took place at the Virginia Beach Sportsplex on June 9, 2012. The official line-up was announced on May 14, 2012.

- Timbaland
- Skillz
- Teddy Riley
- Blackstreet
- Chiddy Bang
- Kirko Bangz
- Fam-Lay
- Bison
- T. Mills
- Missy Elliott
- Slim 112
- Bei Maejor
- Dev

=== 2013 ===
- J. Cole
- Kid Ink
- Juicy J
- Travis Mills
- B. Smyth
- Pusha T
- We Never Sleep

=== 2014 ===
- Pharrell Williams
- August Alsina
- Rico Love
- Mack Wilds
- No Malice
- Sean Paul
- Chris Richardson

=== 2015 ===
- Trey Songz
- Ma$e
- Timbaland
- DMX (cancelled)
- Jidenna
- Sage the Gemini (cancelled)
- Tink
- Young Money Yawn
- Nay Nay & Bryan Mahon

=== 2016 ===
- Diplo
- Travis Scott
- G Unit
- Lil Dicky
- Pusha T
- Eric Stanley
- Daya
- Lex
- Rotimi
- Andrew Hypes
- Bia
- Evan Barlow
- J.R.Clark
- Nay Nay & Bryan Mahon

Tha Wave

=== 2017 ===
- Fetty Wap
- ASAP Ferg
- Ashanti
- Amine (rapper)
- Kyle (musician)
- Aaron Carter

=== 2018 ===
- NERD
- French Montana
- MGK
- Madison Beer
- Rae Sremmurd

=== 2023 ===
Method Man and Redman

Toosii

BIA

== See also ==
- List of festivals in the United States
