= Vermont Quilt Festival =

American annual event

Vermont Quilt Festival was an annual event, which is both the oldest and largest quilting event in the region. Featuring a weekend of quilt exhibits, contest quilts, classes taught by renowned quiltmakers, a champagne preview, vendors, lectures and appraisals, the festival is well attended by both beginner and expert quilters alike.

== History ==
In 1977, the Festival started as a one-day show featuring both antique and new quilts. The following year contest quilts were added, and by 1981 the Festival included classes and also appraisals of antique quilts.

Originally held in Northfield, Vermont, the annual event took place on the Norwich University campus until 2006. The Festival moved its venue to the Champlain Valley Expo in Essex Junction, Vermont with classes held at the neighboring Saint Michael's College in Colchester, Vermont where it continues to be held yearly on the last weekend in June, except 2020 when it was cancelled due to COVID-19 pandemic concerns. 2021 sees a virtual festival.

In May 2023, a month before the annual quilt festival in Essex Junction, Vermont, organizers announced the Vermont Quilt Festival was canceled and was closing permanently. According to a statement by Marti DelNevo, chair of the board of directors, quoted in the Vermont Public, the 2023 festival saw lower-than-expected sign-ups for vendors and classes, leading to a projected budget shortfall of over $70,000 USD.

Prior to its closure in 2023, the Vermont Quilt Festival, Inc., a non-profit organization, held its annual festival a total of 46 consecutive years.

== Notable facts ==
The Festival opened with a festive Champagne and Chocolate Preview each year which has been attended by the Governor of Vermont.

Yankee Magazine, Quilter's Newsletter Magazine, Vermont Life, The New York Times, The Boston Globe, USA Today and Quilt Mania as well as local media are just some of the publications that have covered the event.

It is consistently designated as a Top Ten Summer event by the Vermont Chamber of Commerce, and as one of the Top 100 Events by The American Bus Association.
