= Festival of Mountain and Plain =

Pioneer celebration in Denver

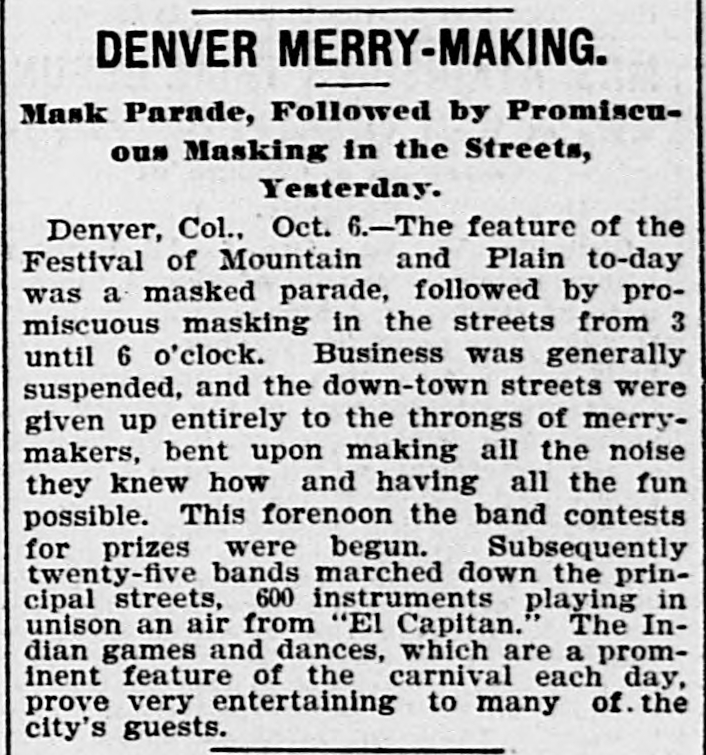
Clipping from the Kansas City Journal October 7, 1897

The Festival of Mountain and Plain was an annual celebration of pioneer days in the Old West held in early October in Denver from 1895 to 1899, and in 1901 with a final attempt at revival in 1912. Organized by The Mountain and Plain Festival Association, the event featured a parade and rodeo. It continued until at least 1902. It was a regional celebration and drew pioneers from throughout the West, many of whom had participated in the events celebrated.

William Byers, founder of the Rocky Mountain News, Colorado's first newspaper, was one of its promoters and directors. He originated many of its features: the bal champedre (outdoor ball), a great public masquerade ball held on Broadway; and the four great parades: first, a pageant of western history; second, a masked parade; and, on the third day "a military and social parade, ending with a sham battle at City Park, and in the evening the parade of the slaves of the silver serpent."
