= National Cornbread Festival =

Annual festival in South Pittsburg, Tennessee, United States

Coordinates: 35.0127°N 85.7042°W

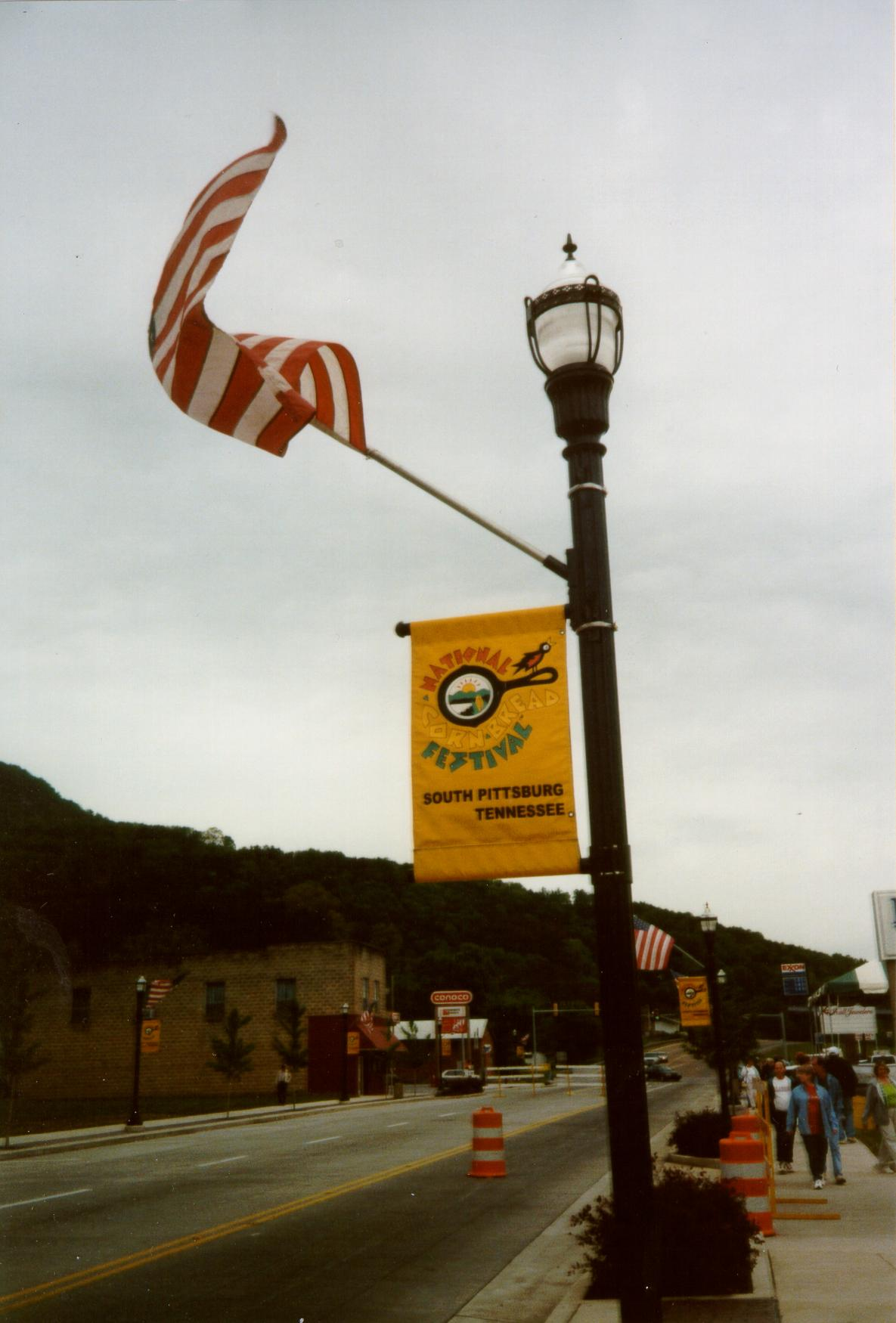
National Cornbread Festival banner

The National Cornbread Festival is a celebration of cornbread and cornbread-related activities. The festival, held in South Pittsburg, Tennessee from 1997 to 2019 during the last full weekend in April, will resume in 2022. Among the attractions featured at the National Cornbread Festival are:

- The Cornbread Cookoff
- The Cornbread Eating Competition
- The Cornbread 5k Race
- Cornbread Alley (a sampling of various cornbread recipes from local organizations)
- Arts and Crafts from area vendors
- Tours of the Lodge Cast Iron Skillet Foundry
- Tours of historic South Pittsburg
- The Cornbread Classic Car Cruise-In
- Live music from performers including perennial favorite, Rhonda Vincent

In the year 2000 the National Cornbread Festival was selected as one of the top 100 events in North America by the American Bus Association.

The COVID-19 pandemic was to blame for all cancellations since 2020; the 24th was deferred to April 2022.

== 2007 National Cornbread Competition winners ==
- Cornbread Eating Competition

Matthew Tichenor of Birmingham, AL

Chad Campbell of Florence, AL

- Buttermilk Chug

Nicholas Harris of Huntsville, AL
