= List of Seattle street fairs and parades =

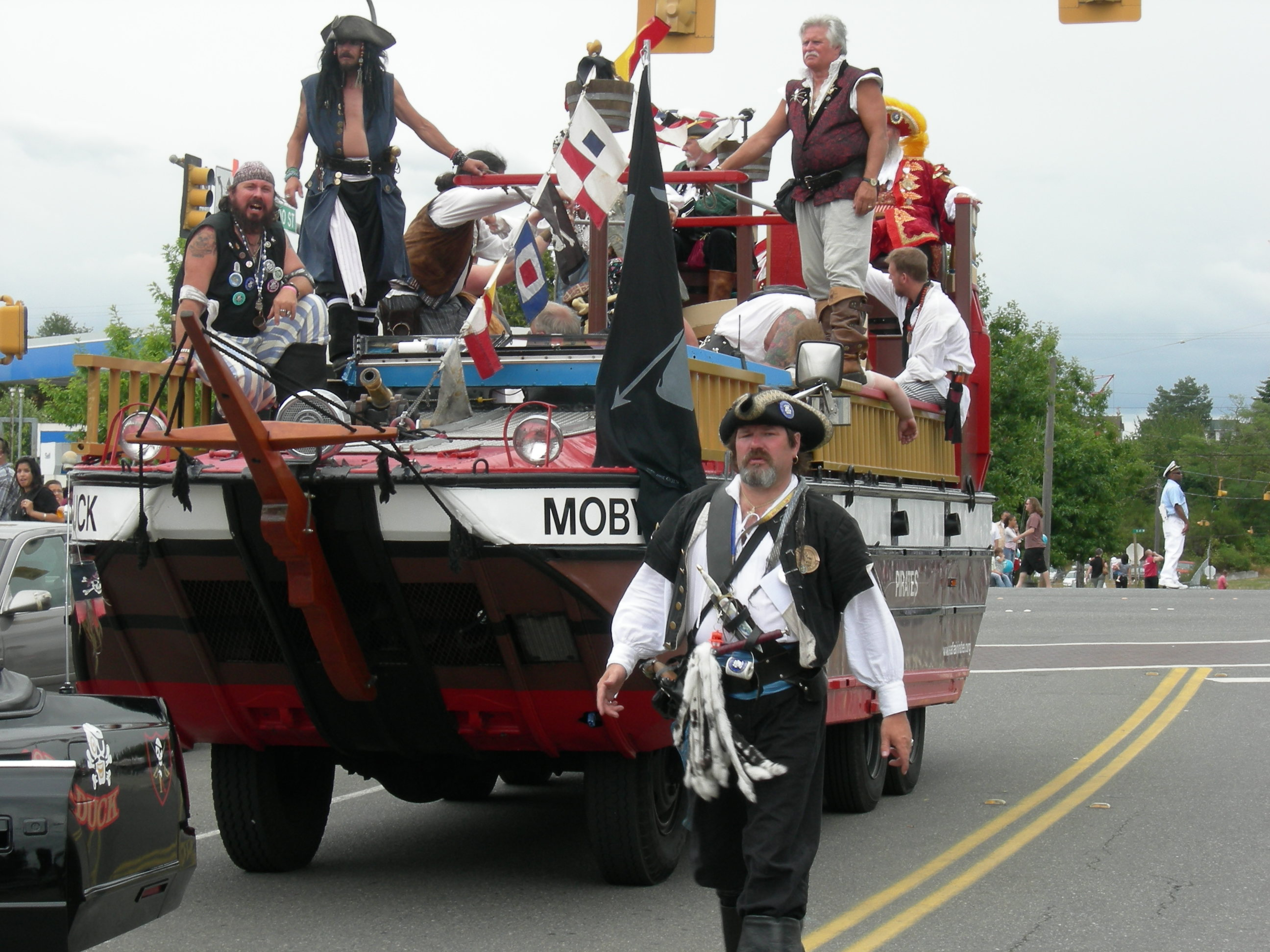
The Seafair Pirates, depicted here at White Center Jubilee Days (2007) just south of Seattle, are longstanding fixtures of Seattle's Seafair-sanctioned parades.

Seattle, Washington, United States has almost twenty neighborhoods that host one or more street fairs and/or parades.

== Ballard ==
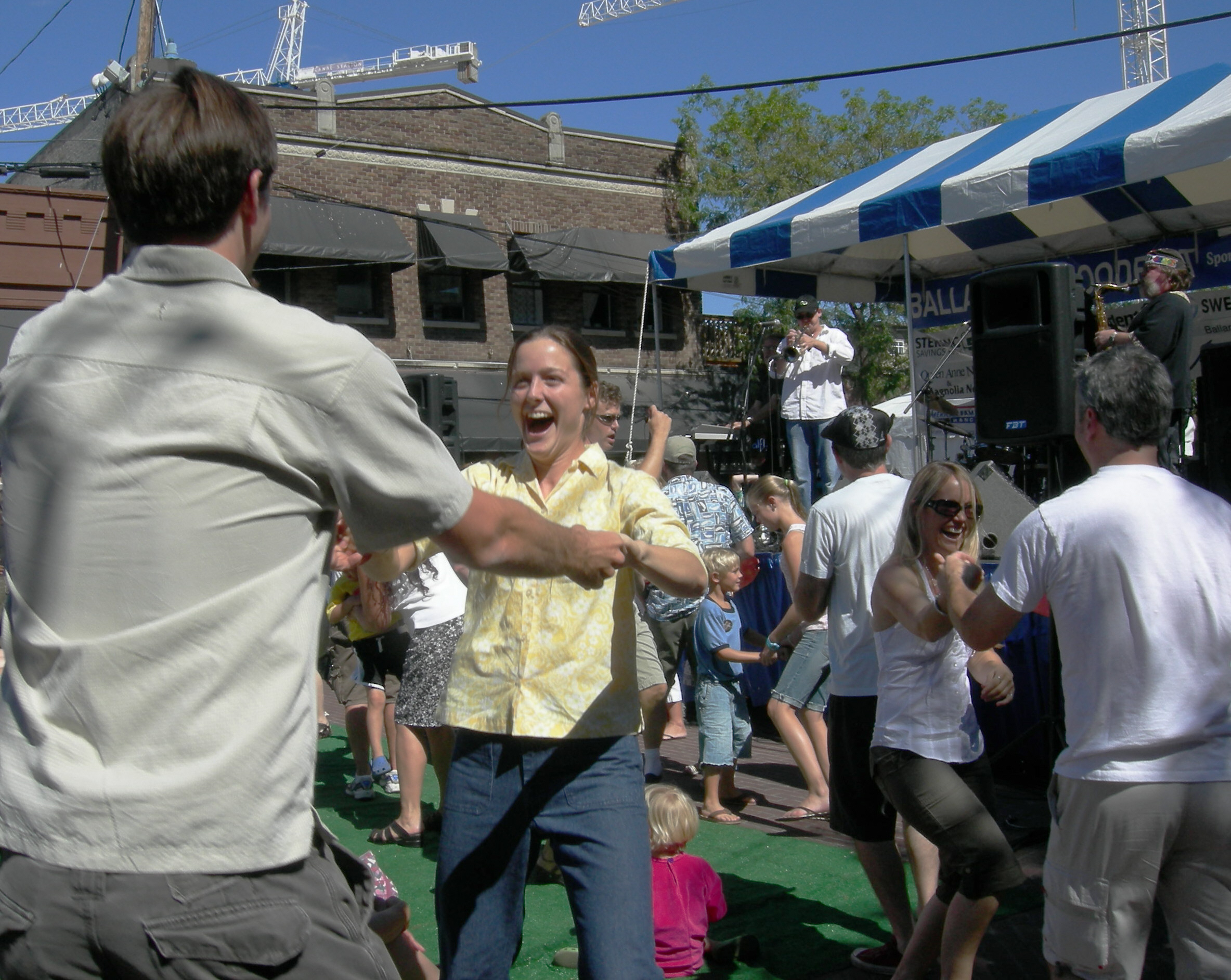
Dancing in the street at Ballard Seafood Fest (2007)

- 17 May Festival - Syttende Mai
- Ballard Seafood Fest: a Seafair-sanctioned event
- Sustainable Ballard Festival

== Beacon Hill ==
- Beacon Hill Block Party

== Capitol Hill ==
- Capitol Hill Block Party

== Central District ==
- Central Area Community Festival

== Downtown ==
- Pike Place Market Street Festival
- Pioneer Square Fire Festival
- Seattle Pride Parade and PrideFest
- Torchlight Parade

== Eastlake ==
- Lake Union's LakeFest

== Fremont ==
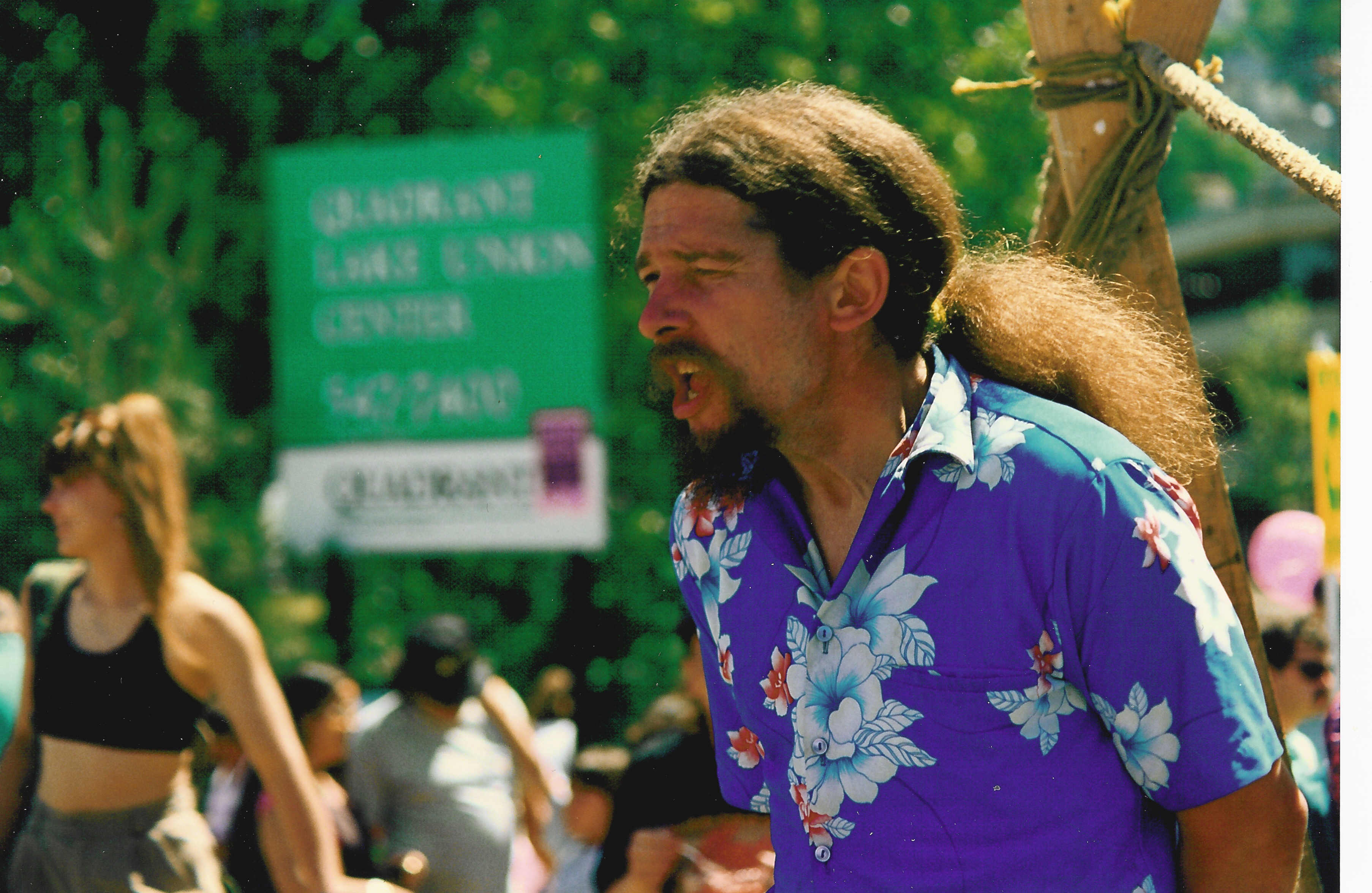
Street performer "Reverend Chumleigh" at the Fremont Fair (1993)

- Fremont Fair: origin of the Summer Solstice Parade and Pageant
- Fremont Octoberfest

== Georgetown ==
- Georgetown Music Festival

== Greenwood and Phinney Ridge ==
- Greenwood-Phinney Seafair Parade: a Seafair-sanctioned event

== Chinatown-International District ==
- Chinatown Seafair Parade: a Seafair-sanctioned event
- Dragon Fest
- Lunar New Year Celebration
- CID Night Market
- CID Food Walk
- CID Block Party

== Lake City ==
- Lake City Pioneer Days: a Seafair-sanctioned event

== Magnolia ==
- Magnolia Summer Festival and Art Show: a Seafair-sanctioned event

== Mount Baker ==
- Mount Baker Day in the Park

== Queen Anne ==
- The Crown of Queen Anne Fun Run, Walk & Children's Parade: a Seafair-sanctioned event

== Rainier Valley ==
- Rainier Valley SummerFest and Rainier Valley Heritage Parade

== Roosevelt ==
- Roosevelt Bull Moose Festival: a Seafair-sanctioned event

== South Lake Union ==
- South Lake Union Block Party

== University District ==
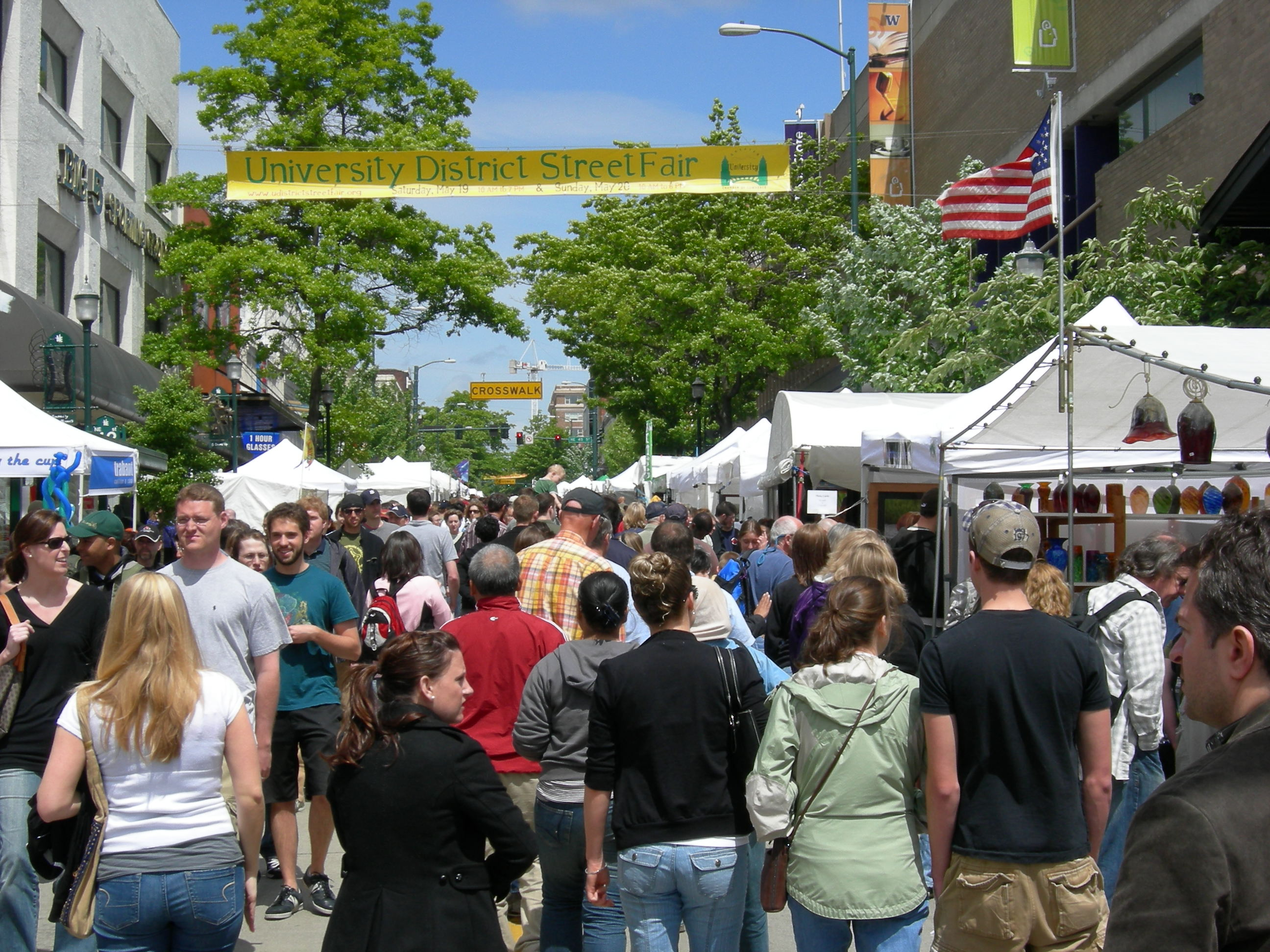
Crowds on University Way ("The Ave") at U. District Street Fair (2007)

- University District Street Fair

== Wallingford ==
- Wallingford Seafair Kiddie Parade & Street Fair: a Seafair sanctioned event
- Wallingford Wurst Fest

== West Seattle ==
- West Seattle Grand Parade: a Seafair-sanctioned event
- West Seattle Summer Fest

== White Center ==
- White Center Jubilee Days Parade: a Seafair-sanctioned event
