= List of festivals in Alaska =

This is a list of notable festivals in Alaska.

== Festivals ==
Festival	Location	Years active	Status	Ref.
Alaska State Fair	Palmer, Alaska	1936–		
Anchorage International Film Festival	Anchorage, Alaska	2001 -		
Bladder Festival				
Nalukataq	North Slope Borough, Alaska			
Tanana Valley State Fair	Fairbanks, Alaska	1924 -		
