= Kansas City Irish Fest =

Festival celebrating Celtic pride in Kansas City

Coordinates: 39°04′58″N 94°34′53″W

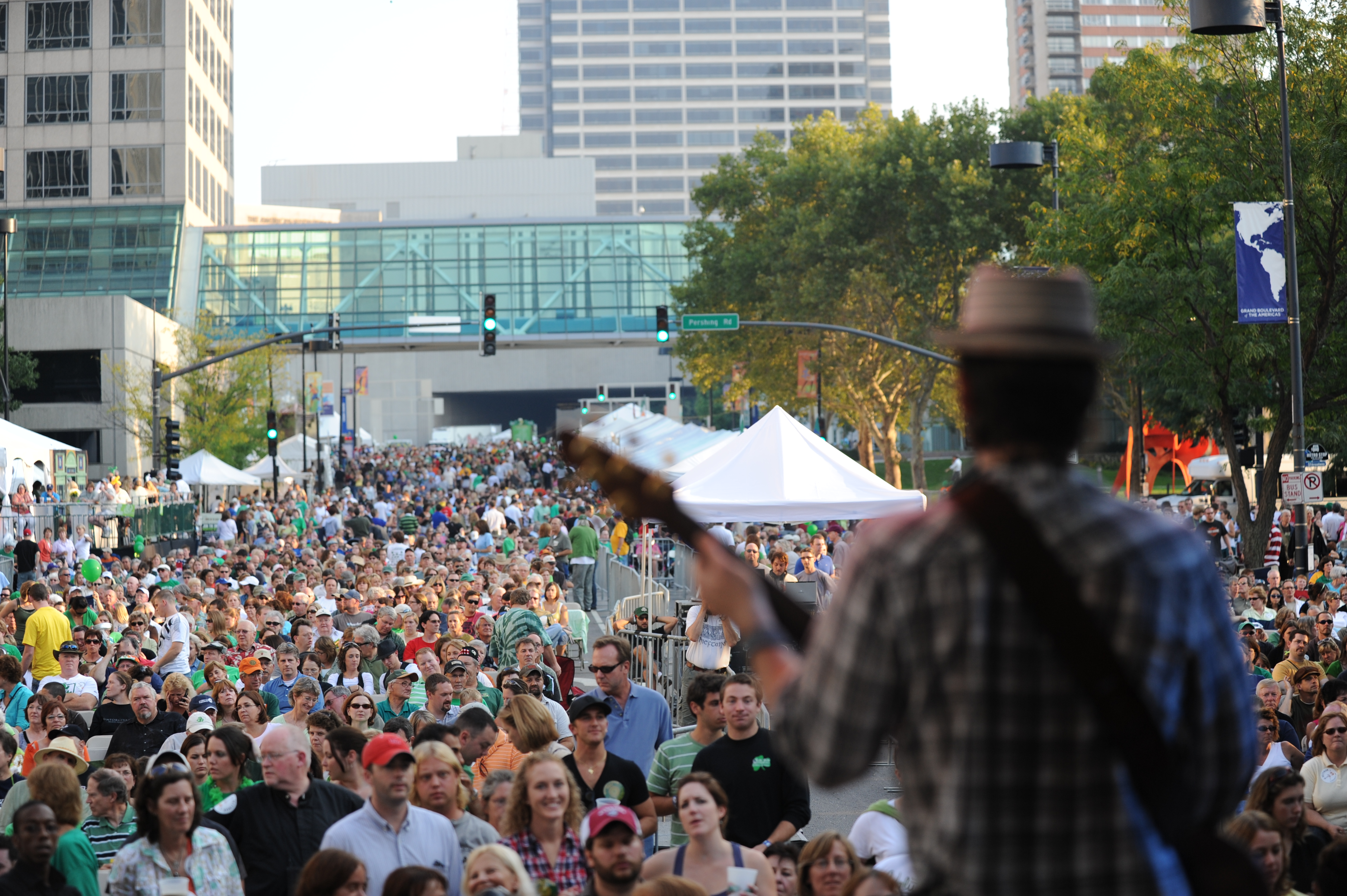
Scythian playing on the Boulevard Stage at Kansas City Irish Fest in 2009

Kansas City Irish Fest celebrates Celtic pride in Kansas City dedicated to promoting the culture, music, character and history of Ireland and of the Irish people who call Kansas City home. It was voted by visitors as the "Best Ethnic Festival" in Kansas City in 2011, 2010 and 2009, and the "Best Festival" in Kansas City in 2008 and 2007.

Founded in 2003 and located in the heart of Kansas City at Crown Center Square, Kansas City Irish Fest hosts more than 90,000 people each Labor Day weekend. The KC Irish Fest annually presents dozens of musicians, dancers, comedians and entertainment from around the world on 8 stages.

The festival was born from the merger of two successful smaller Kansas City neighborhood events, the Brookside and Westport Irish fests. KCIF is almost 100 percent volunteer staffed, and uses the help of nearly 1,500 volunteers annually.

2020 saw a virtual event caused by COVID-19 pandemic.

Music and Dance Performers scheduled for 2019

· The Ashley Davis Band

· Wallis Bird

· Boys of the Priaire

· Kian Byrne

· Byrne and Kelly

· Carswell & Hope

· Céilí at the Crossroads

· Creel

· Dave Curley

· Eddie Delahunt

· Doolin’

· The Driscoll School of Irish Dance

· Barnacle Duggles

· Eddie Edwards

· Enter the Haggis

· Flannigan's Right Hook

· Gaelic Storm

· Shane Hennessy

· The High Kings

· The Irish Aires

· Jump 2 – 3's

· Damian McCarthy

· The Moxie Strings

· One for the Foxes

· The O’Riada Manning Academy of Irish Dance

· Pigeon Kings

· Red Hot Chilli Pipers

· Bob Reeder

· Gerald Trimble and Jambaroque

· Tullamore
