= West Side Nut Club Fall Festival =

Annual festival in Indiana, US

- Status: Active
- Genre: Community festival
- Frequency: Annually (first full week of October)
- Location: Evansville, Indiana
- Inaugurated: 1921
- Attendance: ~150,000 - 200,000+
- Organiser: West Side Nut Club
- Website: nutclubfallfestival.com

The West Side Nut Club Fall Festival is an annual event held the first full week of every October on Franklin Street in Evansville, Indiana, and is organized by the West Side Nut Club. The festival features over 137 food booths run and operated by not-for-profit groups in the region. It features an eclectic variety of food, particularly both traditional and unique fried food. The festival also includes numerous forms of entertainment, carnival attractions, amateur talent competitions, and a parade.

== Attendance ==
In 2014, festival chairman Tom Moore, had estimated that 30,000 people visit the festival a day, with other members estimating 70,000 on the busiest days. In 2023, the West Side Nutclub had estimated 200,000 people had visited the festival leading up to the weeks end, with around 15,000 to 40,000 visiting a day. Although he lacked statistics to support his claim, radio host Paul Harvey once called it the second-largest street festival in the U.S. in terms of attendees, behind only the New Orleans Mardi Gras. New Orleans Mardi Gras is not a street festival. The closest comparisons are New York City's street festivals, such as the Atlantic Antic, New York's Village Halloween Parade, and Taste of Buffalo festivals.

== History ==
After three successful years of holding Halloween type Festivals, a handful of West Side businessmen decided, in 1921, to form an organization that would handle the duties of putting together successful Fall Festivals and “to initiate, promote, and support any and all movements which are for the betterment of the West Side of Evansville, Indiana; also for the betterment of Evansville as a whole.” The first West Side Nut Club Fall Festival was billed as a Halloween Night, Halloween Carnival, and masked ball. The event was a one night affair and consisted of a parade of costumed people followed by a Halloween Mask Ball. The crowd was estimated at 25,000.

After the first Festival, the Nut Club continued with the one or two night affairs until after World War II. During most of those Festivals, the Nut Club coordinated the decorations, agricultural exhibits, and parades while the Burdette Post of the American Legion sponsored street dances. In 1940, organizers incorporated three rides (Ferris wheel, merry-go-round & mini autos) and an exhibit of caged animals, concessions, and circus acts. In 1942 the rides were moved to the library park on Franklin Street.

Due to World War II, the Festival was halted from 1943 to 1945. In 1946, the festival commenced again and for the first time extended most of the week from Monday through Saturday. During the 1950s the festival experienced substantial growth. Non-profit organizations began selling food in booths on Franklin Street. In 1952, Howell Baptist Church put up its first booth which, according to church sources, served the festival's first Pronto Pups. The 1950s also ushered in larger rides and more well known entertainers.

2020 marked the first cancellation in 75 years. The next year will be its centennial anniversary, its 97th overall. Instead they just held a half-pot drawing.

The Nut Club holds a half-pot drawing each year during the fall festival since 2019. 2022's half-pot was the largest to date with a total pot of $1.64 million.

== Traditions ==
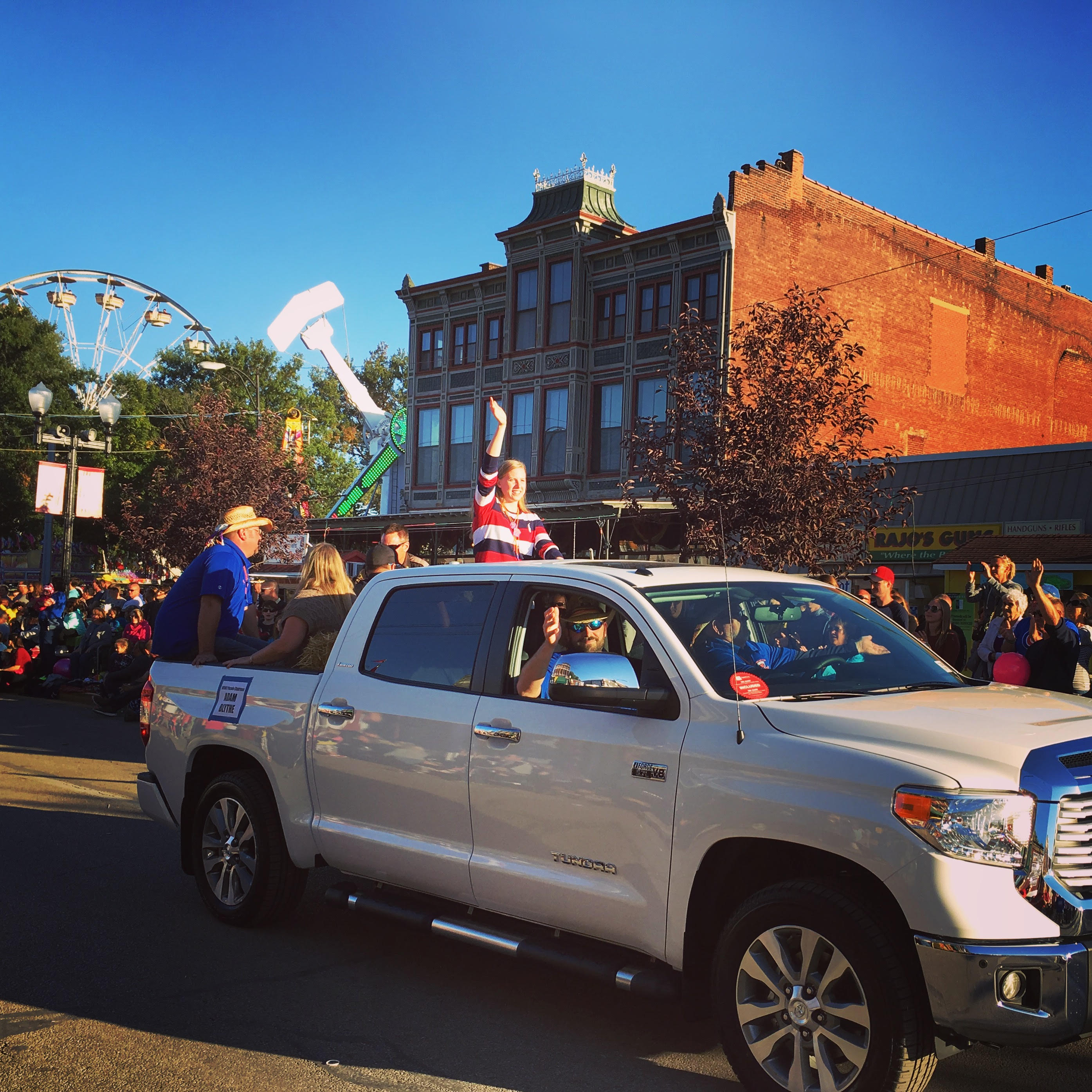
Olympic gold medalist Lilly King as Grand Marshal of the 2016 West Side Nut Club Fall Festival Parade

=== Entertainment ===
The Fall Festival commences on a Sunday and runs all week. Each day includes several music and dance performances by local bands and youth. Saturday, the last day of the festival, is marked by a large parade. The parade is large and draws substantial crowds each year. In 2016, Evansville native Lilly King, a two-time Olympic Gold medalist in the same year, asked to be grand marshal of the parade; the request was granted. King noted, "When you make the Olympic team you get to grand marshal the Fall Festival parade. Fall Festival is a holiday. It’s my favorite holiday. As a Westsider, I have to love Fall Festival."

=== Fried brain sandwich ===
The fair features fried brain sandwiches, a local speciality consisting of battered and deep fried calf or pig brains served on a bun.
