= Festival Latinoamericano =

Annual festival in Provo, Utah

Coordinates: 40°14′01″N 111°39′31″W

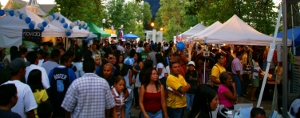
View of Festival Vendors

Festival Latinoamericano, or Latin American Festival, is an annual three-day Labor Day weekend festival in downtown Provo, Utah. The festival highlights Utah's Hispanic culture through food, vendors, and performances and is free to the public. Festival Latinoamericano. It is currently in year 24.

== History and Purpose ==
During the first year in 2001, the Festival was held at the Boulders Apartment Complex with about 75 attendants. The inaugural festival was a giant success, and quickly outgrew its South Provo location. The festival has since become a large yearly event in downtown Provo on the Utah County Historic Courthouse grounds on University Avenue and Center Street. In the last six years the festival has maintained an attendance of approximately 30,000 visitors.

The Festival's purpose is to provide a venue for nonprofit organizations and new companies to provide their services to the Hispanic population. The audience at this event is not restricted to the state of Utah; there are visitors from multiple states including California, Wyoming, and Nevada.

The event showcases local performers of Latin dance and music, and also allows attendees to further explore Latin-American cuisine and culture through dozens of various vendors. Other attractions include carnival rides and lucha libre.

There was no festival in 2020.

== See also ==
- List of festivals in the United States
- Provo, Utah
- Centro Hispano
