= List of events in Houston =

Events in Houston include both regularly scheduled and one-time events. Regularly scheduled events include festivals, conventions, parades, and sporting events.

== Regularly scheduled events ==
- AMA Supercross
- Anime Matsuri
- ApolloCon
- Bayou City Art Festival (formerly the Westheimer Colony Arts Festival)
- Comicpalooza
- Free Press Summer Fest
- Frontier Fiesta
- Houston Art Car Parade
- Houston Auto Show
- Houston Gay and Lesbian Film Festival
- Houston Gay Pride Parade
- Houston Greek Festival
- Houston International Festival (I-Fest)
- Houston Livestock Show and Rodeo
- Houston Marathon
- Juneteenth
- Shell Houston Open
- Texas Renaissance Festival
- Westheimer Street Festival (no longer held biannually since October 17, 2004; the replacement festival, WestFest Compressed, was held in October 2005)

== One-time events ==
- 1992 Republican National Convention
- Rendez-vous Houston
- World Wrestling Entertainment (WWE)'s WrestleMania X-Seven on April 1, 2001
- World Wrestling Entertainment (WWE)'s WrestleMania XXV on April 5, 2009
