= Houston Beer Festival =

The Houston Beer Festival (also known as the Houston Beer Fest) is an annual beer festival held in Houston, Texas since 2011.

In 2020, the 10th annual event was to be moved to Labour Day weekend; but ended up being cancelled on grounds of COVID-19 pandemic. That was deferred to 2021.
