= International Children's Festival =

The International Children’s Festival is a fair that showcases international cultures. Diplomatic embassies host booths about their country and culture intended to introduce children and their families to world geography, dress, and traditions through displays and activities.

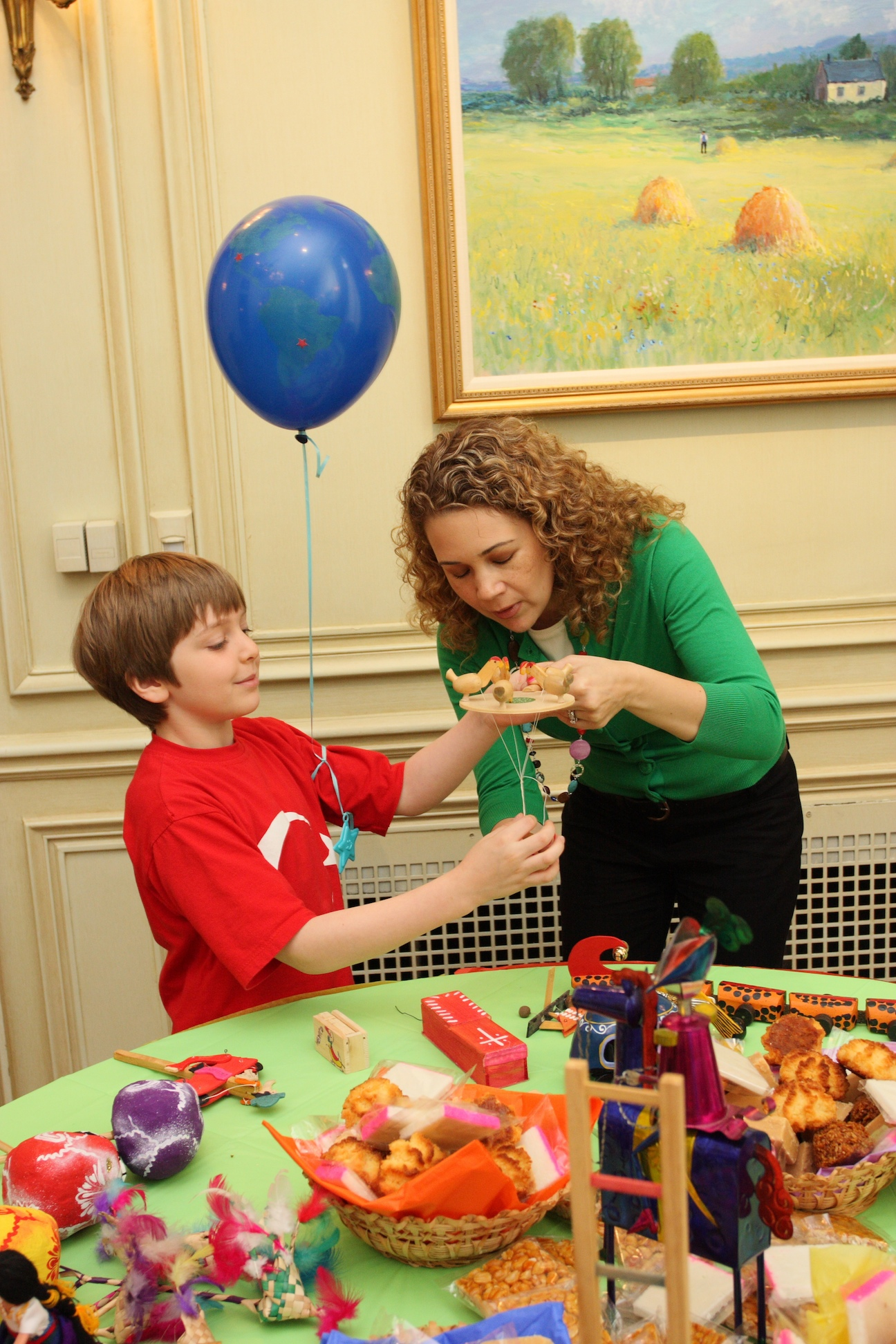
Playing with Mexican toys at the 2008 International Children's Festival

In addition to embassy-sponsored booths, the festival offers international dance and music performances, as well as opportunities to sample international cuisine. In 2009, Michelle Fenty, wife of DC Mayor Adrian M. Fenty, supported the festival by serving as Honorary Patron of the event.

The International Children’s Festival is held every May and is located in Meridian’s historic mansions.

== Description ==
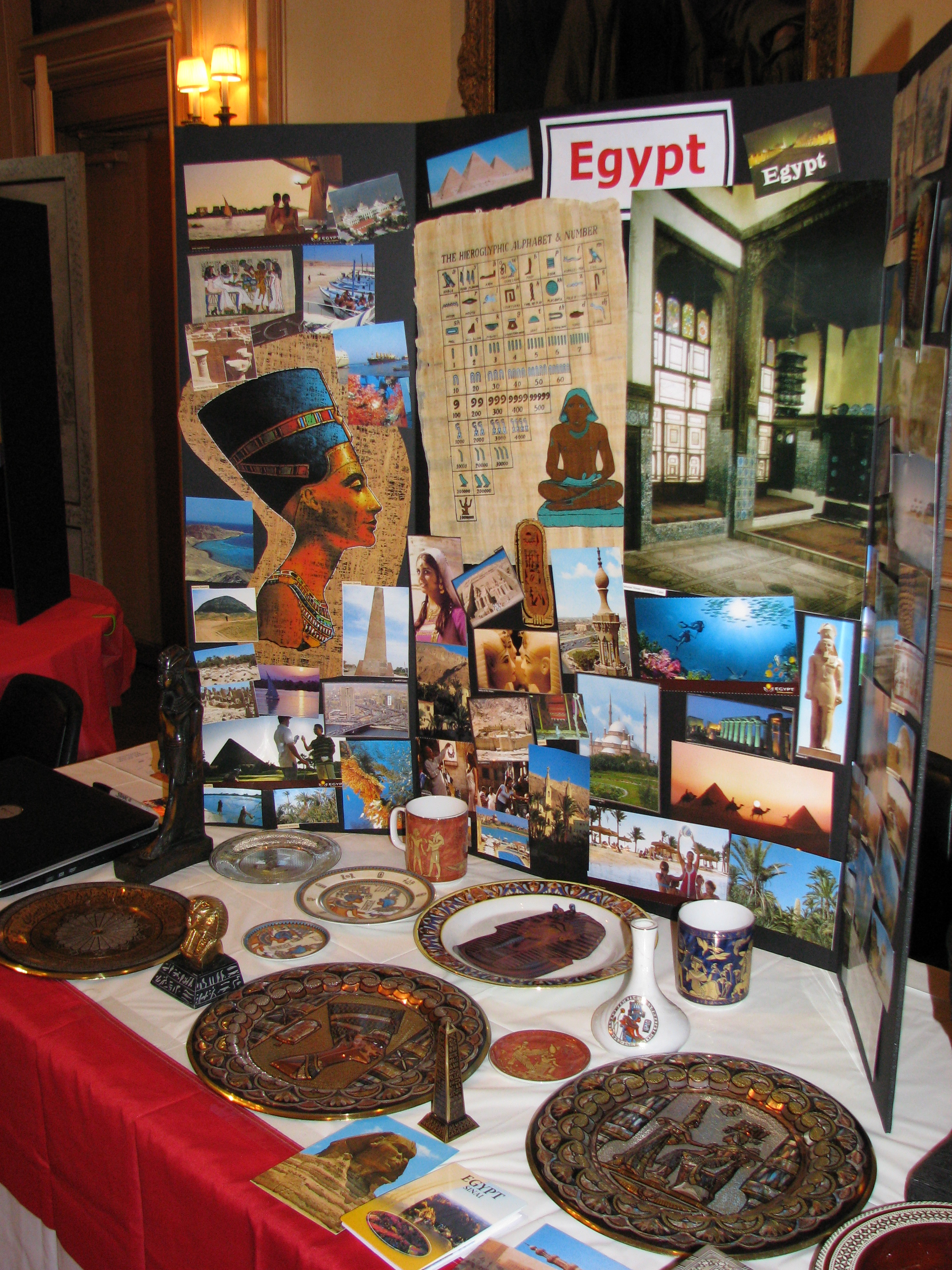
The Embassy of Egypt's booth

Embassies host booths at the Festival, allowing visitors to experience another culture. Embassies bring artifacts, displays, and activities about their country and culture.

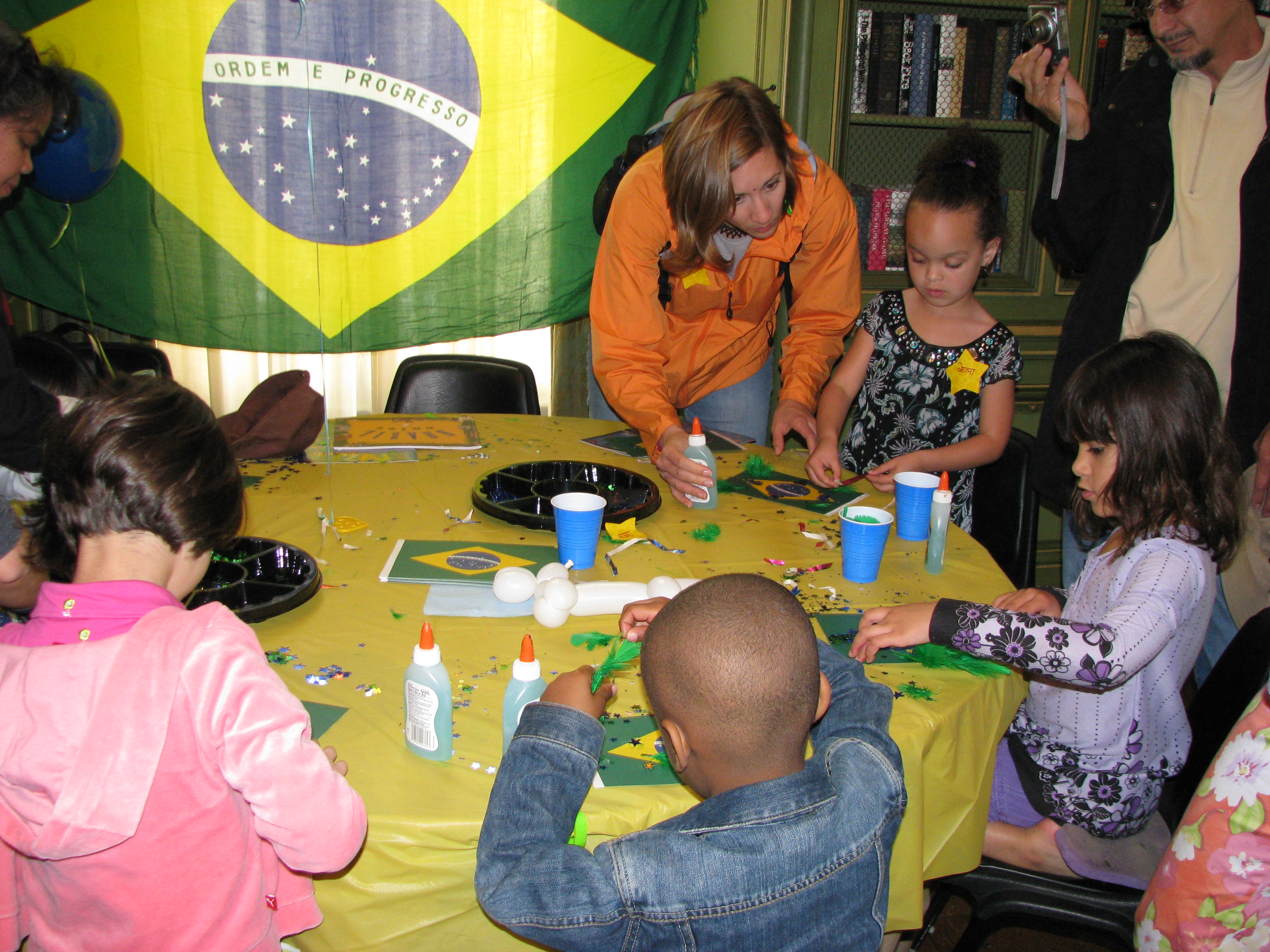
Children learn about Brazil's Carnival celebrations while decorating masks

Food and drink samples are present at each booth, as well as crafts and activities. Booth activities have included trying on traditional Indonesian dress, stamping Kente cloth (Ghana), folding origami (Japan), writing hieroglyphics (Egypt), creating Carnival masks (Brazil), exploring Mexican children's toys and more.

=== Participating Embassies 2010 ===
Argentina, Australia, Bahamas, Bahrain, Brazil, China, El Salvador, Fiji, France, Ghana, Greece, Hungary, Indonesia, Israel, Japan, Liechtenstein, Mexico, Senegal, South Africa, Switzerland, Turkey, Zambia, as well as representation from the United Nations.

== Performances ==
In addition to the interactive booths sponsored by embassies, the Festival exhibits dance performances from local and international artists.

== Other Educational Outreach Programs ==
=== International Classroom ===
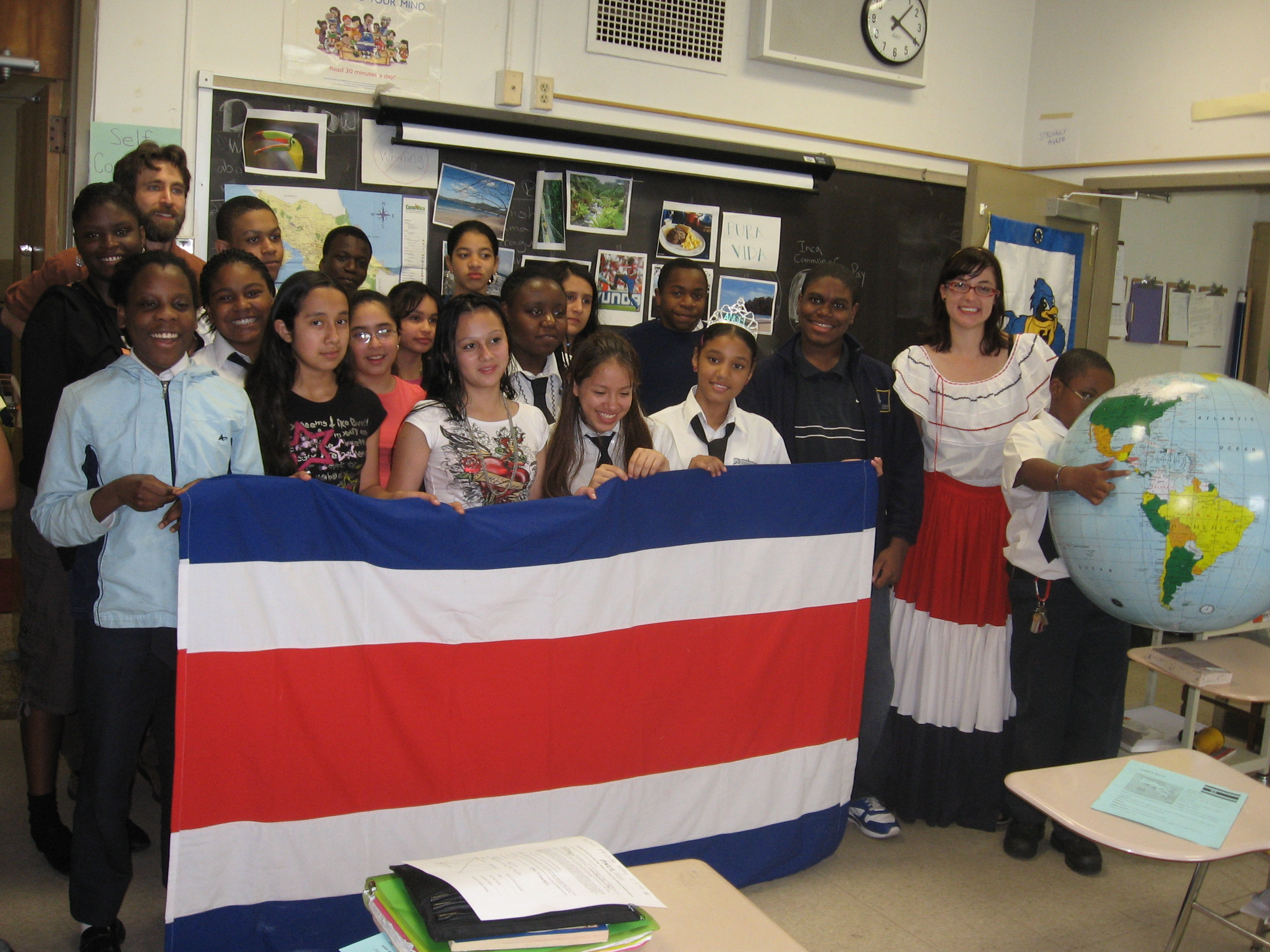
Students posing after a Costa Rica presentation

The International Children’s Festival is a part of Meridian’s educational outreach initiatives.

=== International Resource Library ===
International Classroom offers teachers resources to help them include more international education in their curricula. Meridian has Culture Boxes that contain items from a specific country or region to help aid learning.

=== Teacher Workshops ===
International Classroom also offers a professional development workshop, Passports to the World, for DC teachers each fall on how to internationalize their curricula while meeting current Standards of Learning.
