= Tulsa International Mayfest =

Arts festival in Oklahoma, US

Tulsa International Mayfest (often known locally simply as "Mayfest") is an annual three-day arts festival in Tulsa, Oklahoma, United States, that began in 1973, which has been held over the years in various area of Downtown Tulsa. The festival attracts about 100,000 people during the third weekend of May, although festival length and weekend has varied in some years. Focused primarily on art and art experiences, the event advertises itself as "the largest free festival in Northeast Oklahoma."

Tulsa International Mayfest in 2018

== History ==
In 1973 the first festival, "Jubilee 73" was created by the Junior League of Tulsa, as Tulsa's first visual and performing arts festival The following years were run by the Arts and Humanities Council of Tulsa and Downtown Tulsa Unlimited, starting with "Festival 74" through "Festival 77" until the name settled in "Tulsa International Mayfest" in 1978.

In 2020, Tulsa International Mayfest became and independent entity and then reunited with the Arts and Humanities Council and was cancelled due to the COVID-19 pandemic before returning in 2021. Following the shutdown of the Arts and Humanities Council of Tulsa, management of Mayfest was taken over by TU, which ran the festival from 2023 to 2025 During a transition period in 2026, Tulsa International Mayfest celebrated local artists and the Centennial of Route 66 with a series of pop-ups called "Mayfest Road Trip"

== Current operation ==
As of 2026, Tulsa International Mayfest, Inc.'s all-volunteer board and steering committee, many of whom helped managed the festival in previous decades, manage the planning and operations of the festival.

The 2027 festival is planned to return the "Deco District" May 14-16, 2027 amongst the historic sky rises and businesses in the blocks surrounding 3rd and Main with a renewed focus on bringing exposures to the arts and artists.
