= Shenandoah Apple Blossom Festival =

Festival in Winchester, Virginia, US

Coordinates: 39°11′8.6″N 78°9′49.0″W

The Shenandoah Apple Blossom Festival ("The Bloom") is a 14-day festival held annually in spring in Winchester, Virginia. First held in 1924, it is one of the oldest civic celebrations in the Commonwealth of Virginia.

== History ==
The festival was first held Saturday, May 3, 1924, and was originally celebrated as a one-day event (although not held in 1942–1945 due to World War II). Features include a Grand Feature Parade, Firefighters' Parade (first held on Thursday, April 18, 1929), a carnival and midway, luncheons, races, walks, dances and concerts, as well as a field show competition which formerly gave out the Queen's Cup trophy to the winner (although the trophy was retired in 1977, by Princess Anne High School of Virginia Beach, Virginia after winning the competition three straight years). The Queen, Queen Shenandoah, has been crowned every year at John Handley High School (with the exception of 2007, due to ongoing renovations), starting with the original Queen, Elizabeth Steck (Arthur).

A loss of interest during the 1930s, prompted the appointment of Tom Baldridge to the seat of Executive Director of the festival. He was also employed at MGM in the publicity department, which allowed him the opportunity to schedule celebrities, in turn renewing public interest in the festival. The period of the 1960s and 1970s introduced various new aspects to the festival including: the first visit by a U.S. President, Lyndon B. Johnson (1964), the beginning of attendance by sports celebrities Jack Dempsey (1965), and the premier of Sunday in the Park (1975). The Cole Brothers Circus of the Stars, still a favorite of children, first appeared at the festival in 1981.

== The festival today ==
The festival is run by the private Shenandoah Apple Blossom Festival organization and attracts over 250,000 people. Highlights include the Old Town Wine & Fine Arts Festival and the Apple Blossom Carnival.

The festival is known for its many guest celebrities and events. During the spring, in preparation for the festival, the citizens of Winchester hold an annual clean-up, followed by decoration of the city in green, pink and white (festival colors), in order to make Winchester more presentable for its anticipated guests.

On March 17, 2020 it was announced that planning for the 2020 festival was suspended due to the COVID-19 pandemic, effectively cancelling the event for that year.

The festival was held in 2021 with the theme “Back in Bloom.” Offering 21 events, this 2021 festival was condensed when compared with earlier instances of the festival, which generally presented more than twice that number of events. Restrictions due to the COVID-19 pandemic were in place for the 2021 festival, such as the requirement that a maximum of 900 people attend the Apple Blossom Carnival at any one time.
