= Sawdust Art Festival =

Art festival in California, U.S.

Coordinates: 33.5506°N 117.7785°W

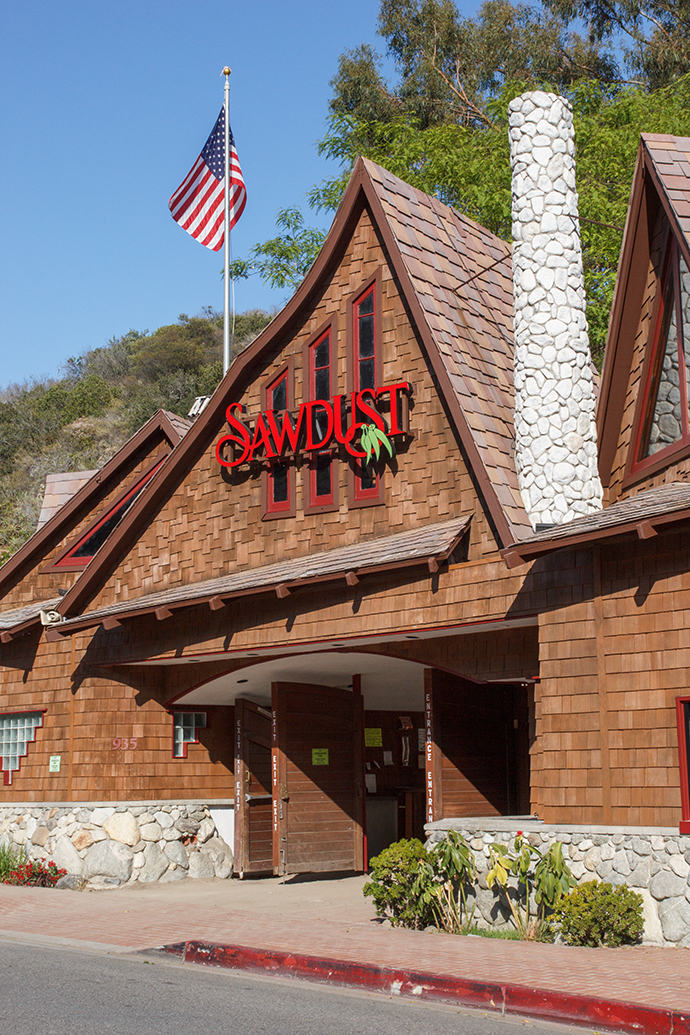
Sawdust Art Festival facade

The Sawdust Art Festival, also known as The Sawdust or The Sawdust Festival, is an art festival held annually from late June through August in Laguna Beach, California. The festival features handicrafts as well as traditional fine art. It is non-juried, but exhibitors are required to be Laguna Beach residents. About 200,000 visitors attend each year. The Sawdust also hosts an annual Winter Fantasy art fair in mid-November through December, which is open to non-resident exhibitors.

== Description ==
The Sawdust Art Festival is an annual art festival, held in Laguna Beach, California, from the end of June to the end of August. There is also a "Sawdust Winter Fantasy" festival, running weekends from mid-November through December, and open to non-resident exhibitors.

As the only non-juried art festival in Laguna, the Sawdust displays paintings, sculpture, printmaking, photography, glass, ceramics, jewelry, woodwork, furniture, textiles, clothing and mixed media. The festival also features glassblowing demonstrations, ceramic center, art workshops, a children's art booth, outdoor cafes, a saloon and a variety of live musical entertainment.

The festival is estimated to draw about 200,000 visitors each summer. In 2024, the Sawdust Festival included 180 artists and three live music stages.

== History ==
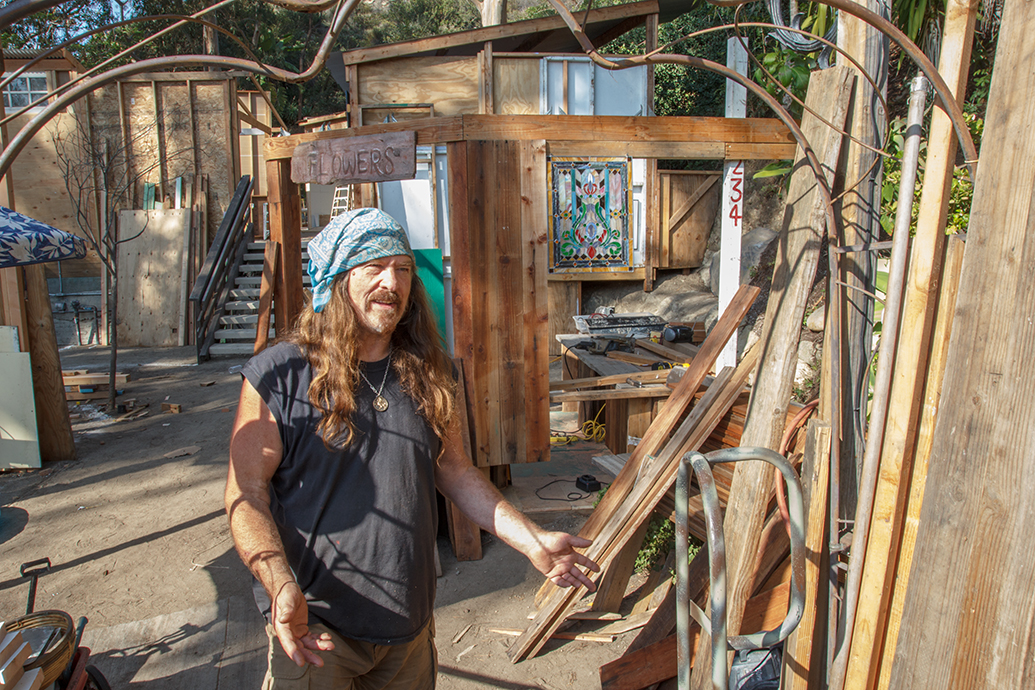
Sawdust booth construction

In the 1960s, a group of "hippie"-type artists were dissatisfied with the nearby Laguna Beach Festival of Arts (FOA) and its jury system, which they viewed as rigged and part of The Establishment. This group held their first exhibit in 1965 on the vacant Peacock lot near Park Avenue in Laguna; it was called "The Rejects Festival" by some in the media and at the FOA. The group held their second showing in 1967 on the Kronquist lot in north Laguna.

In 1968, the festival moved to its present three-acre site on Laguna Canyon Road, across the street from the established FOA. At this location, Sawdust artists began building, "wildly conceived, mostly wood-built quasi-dwellings, which were heavy on the rustic theme, with no two alike." They also built a wooden, fort-like gate, and spread sawdust or wood chips onto the bare ground.

While the festival in its early days had a carnival atmosphere, with streakers and religious fanatics preaching amid the booths, it was sparsely attended. Admission was initially free; but it was raised to 25 cents in the early 1970s, "only after some locals came to chant and preach rather than look," according to an early exhibitor.

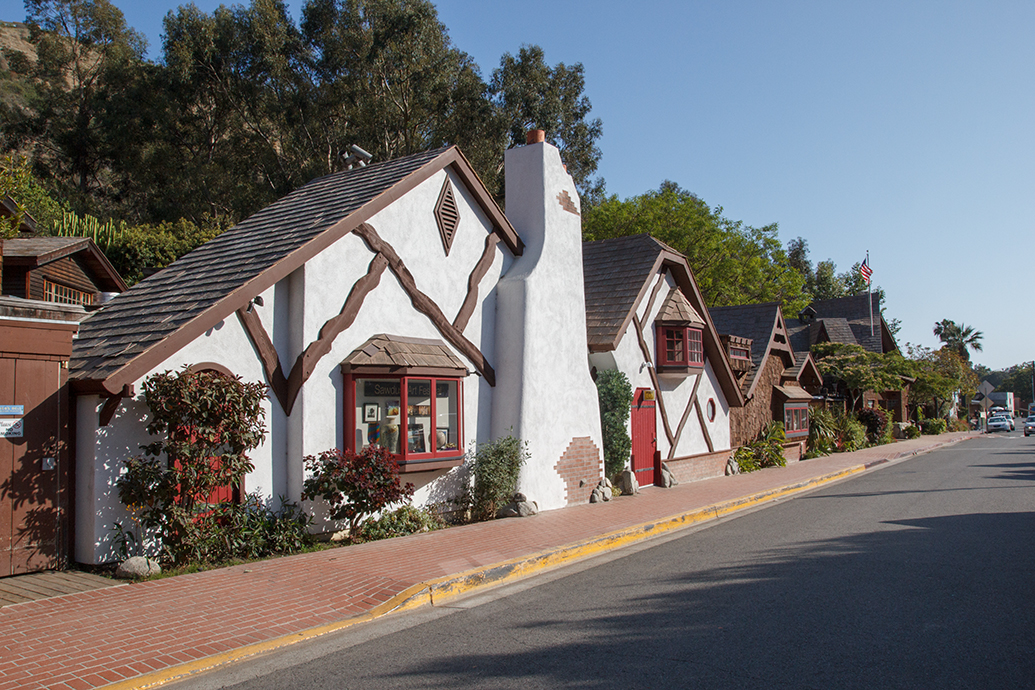
Sawdust facade, eastern end

Attendance grew and reached a peak of 350,000 in the early 1970s. By the mid-1980s, the home-made booths, gate, and sawdust remained, but as the festival became more respectable, attendance fell to around 250,000.

In 1985, the Sawdust spent $60,000 for a new front facade, a mock-up of the nearby Hotel Laguna and three other Laguna buildings. Later, Sawdust management erected a permanent, Bavarian style facade.

The Sawdust's "Benevolence Fund", started in 1987, is a non-profit organization, assisting artists living in Laguna Beach who have, "suffered a catastrophic event, making them unable to work." This fund holds yearly fundraisers.

By the late 1980s, the Sawdust was becoming a bigger tourist attraction than the Festival of Arts.

In 2015, the three Laguna Beach art festivals were included in one admission ticket.
