= Taste of Buffalo =

Food festival in Buffalo, New York

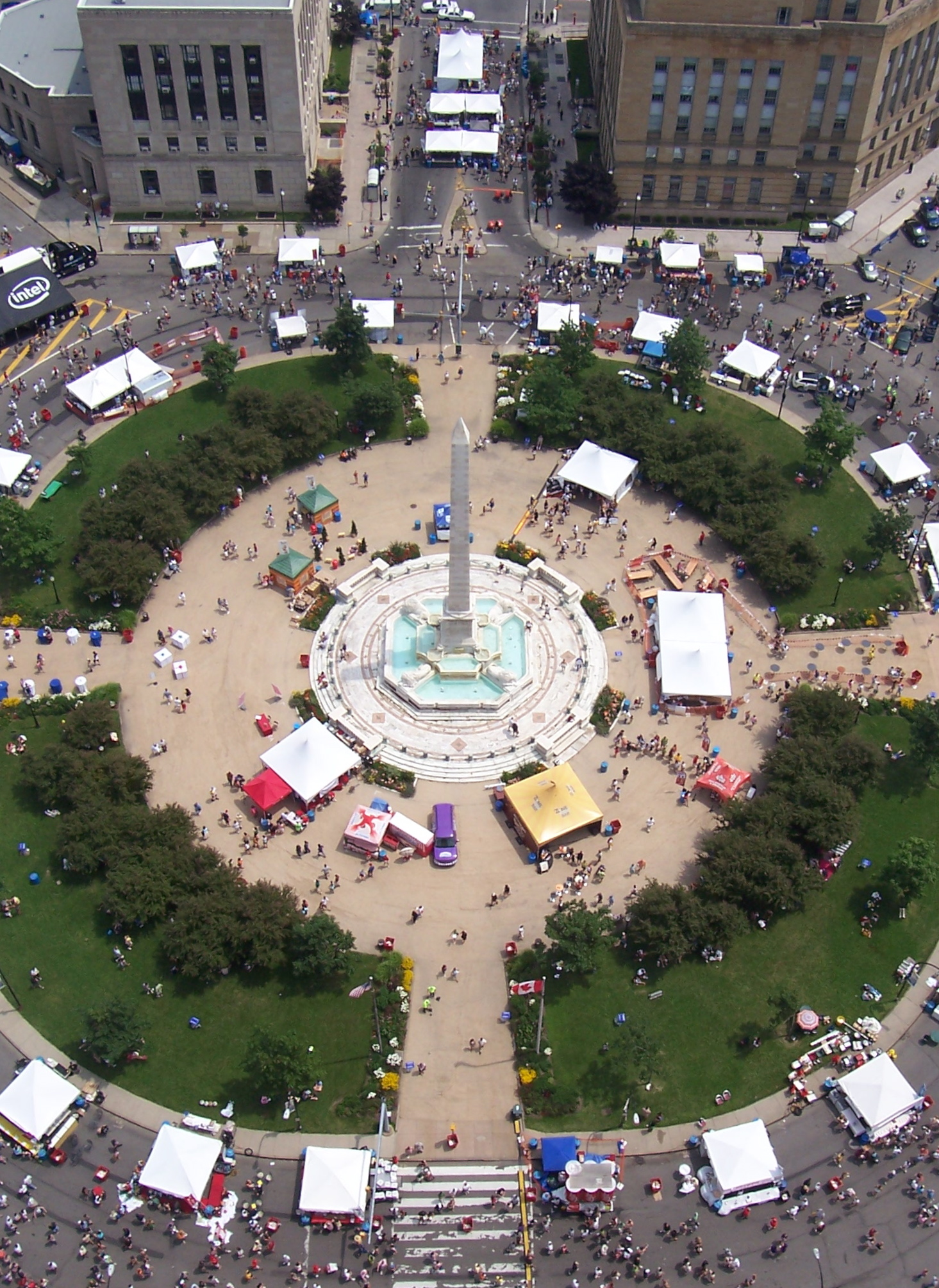
- Niagara Square during Taste of Buffalo 2008
- Frequency: Annual
- Location: Niagara Square
- Years active: 42
- Inaugurated: 1984
- Attendance: 450,000/yr
- Website: www.tasteofbuffalo.com

Taste of Buffalo is the largest annual two-day food festival in the United States. The festival is centered in Downtown Buffalo, New York, along Delaware Avenue from Niagara Square by City Hall to Chippewa Street. It features numerous restaurants and food trucks from the Buffalo region and other cities in Western New York, as well as some national sponsors. The mission of the Taste of Buffalo is "to provide an affordable and enjoyable weekend festival in a socially responsible manner for families of Western New York, and to enhance the quality of life in the Niagara Frontier and promote downtown Buffalo".

== History ==
The non-profit event began in 1984 and as of 2014 attracted almost 450,000 patrons annually, with more than 1,000 volunteers required to run it. The festival has raised more than $360,000 for charities, and awards five $1,000 scholarships each year to local high school students looking to pursue culinary or hospitality degrees. The 30th Annual Taste of Buffalo presented by Tops Friendly Markets took place on July 13 and 14, 2013. In 2018, the festival celebrated its 35th anniversary. Due to the COVID-19 pandemic, the event went virtual in 2020. The festival returned to an in-person event in 2021.

== Events and food offerings ==
During the festival, multiple stages provide musical entertainment and the Culinary Stage showcases cooking demonstrations.

In addition to over 50 local restaurants and wineries, local and national sponsors also provide samples for their products and interactive mobile displays. The majority of restaurants are from the Buffalo area, but the festival also attracts the participation of a few restaurants from nearby cities such as Rochester and Batavia.

Aside from Buffalo specialties such as beef on weck and buffalo wings, other dishes such as chicken and waffles, prime rib, hot dogs and vegetarian options are often served. International foods have also been featured in the past, such as sponge candy, chicken tikka masala, bisque, pierogies, shrimp nachos, watermelon gazpacho, Pad thai, Jamaican patties and rice pudding. A special beer was brewed and served in honor of the Taste of Buffalo's 35th anniversary.

== See also ==
- Festivals in Buffalo, New York
- National Buffalo Wing Festival
