= Friendship Festival =

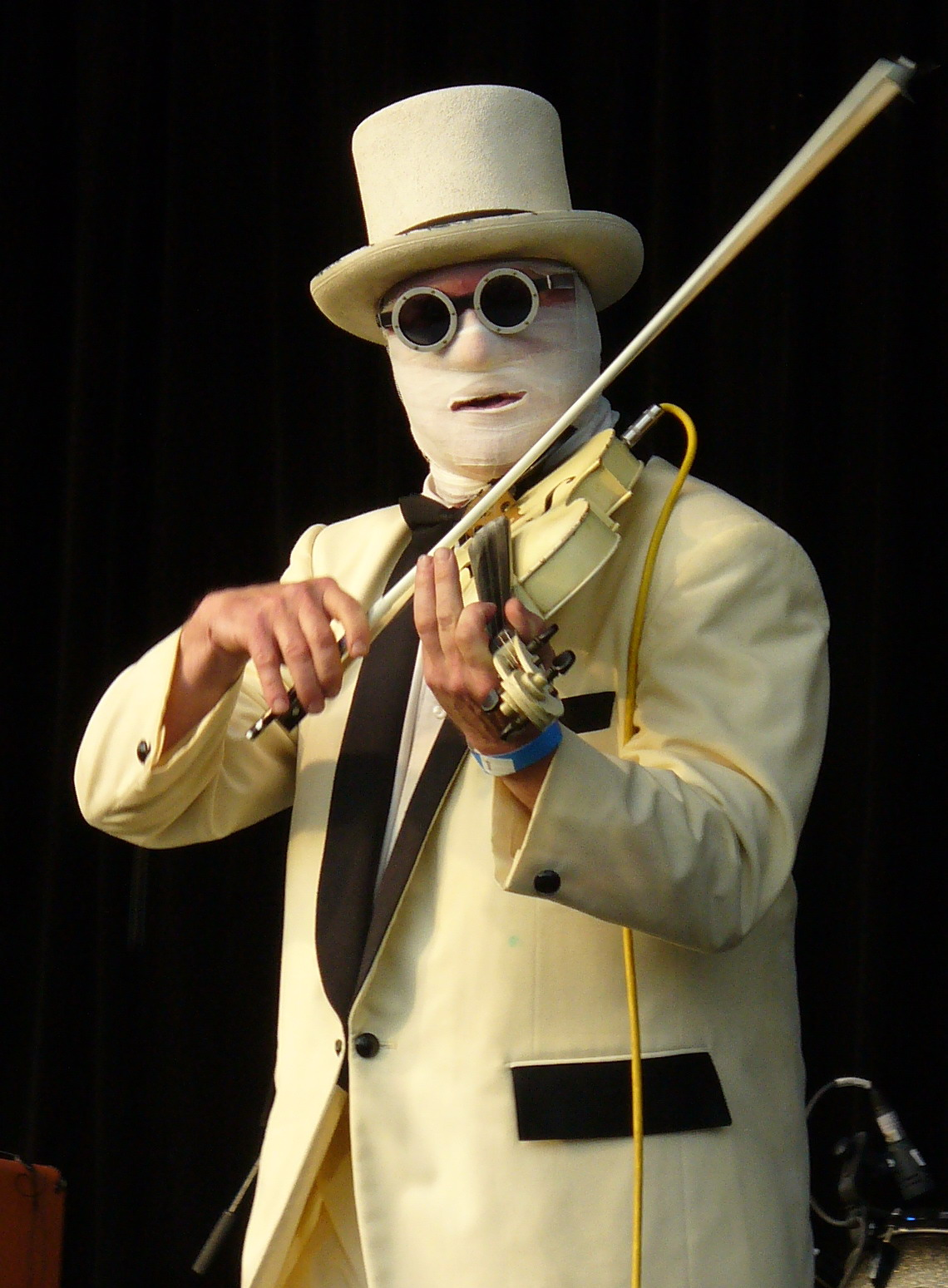
Nash the Slash performing at the 2008 Friendship Festival in Fort Erie

The Friendship Festival was an annual celebration of the bond between Canada and the United States. This event was held in Fort Erie, Ontario and Buffalo, New York, which are connected by the Peace Bridge. The festival ran from 1987 to 2019 and was held from 29 June to 4 July. These dates encompassed Canada Day (July 1) and Independence Day (July 4). The festival also marked the nearly 200 year state of official peace between the two neighbors since the end of the War of 1812.

The festival featured several free events including car shows, concerts with local and big name bands, a midway with rides, vendors, beer gardens, complimentary breakfast each morning, and exotic animal displays. Past performers include Theory of a Deadman in 2008 and Hedley in 2010. In 2012, in lieu of a big name band, Fort Erie's Festival opted to put on a concert series throughout the entire festival, featuring 27 bands from the Niagara and Buffalo areas.
