= List of festivals in North America =

Festivals of North America
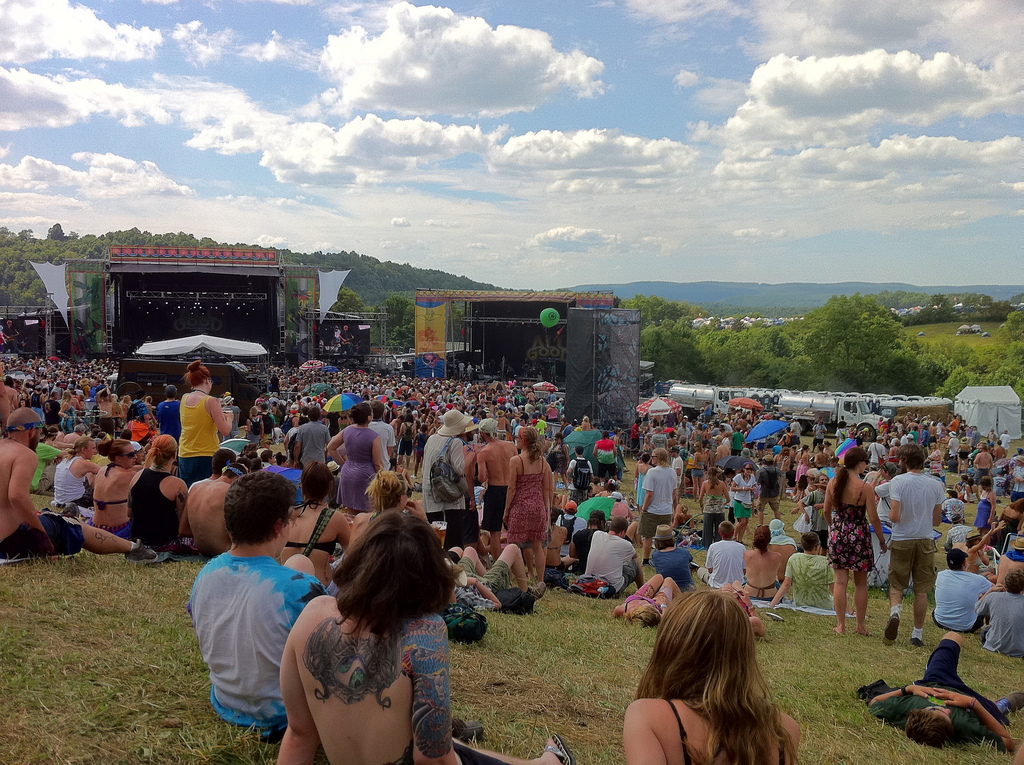

External sublists
- By country: Canada; Costa Rica; Mexico; Jamaica; United States
- By type: Agricultural shows; bluegrass festivals; beer festivals; classical music; dogwood; film; folk; food and drink; harvest; jazz; literary; music festivals

Regional types
- Bluegrass; blues; country music; county fair; dogwood; Caribbean Carnival; hip hop; jazz; mushroom festival; old-time music; pow wow; ribfest; Rocky Mountain Rendezvous; state fair; strawberry festival

Related topics
- Lists of festivals #Continent (Africa; Asia; Europe; Oceania; South America); Lists of festivals #Country; Culture of North America; Tourism in North America

This list of festivals in North America is an incomplete collection of festival sublists organized by type and locale, with links to external sublists where applicable. List of music festivals in North America redirects to this topic, with music festivals denoted with (music) for countries where there is not a dedicated music section. Included are festivals in North America of diverse types, including regional festivals, commerce festivals, fairs, food festivals, arts festivals, religious festivals, folk festivals, and recurring festivals on holidays.

There are several festival types unique to North America. Pow wows have traditionally brought together North American populations, while Rocky Mountain Rendezvous events brought together Native Americans and fur traders as early as 1825. Ancient fiestas and holidays such as Day of the Dead are still celebrated in Central America and Mexico, while unique carnivals such as Mardi Gras have developed along the Gulf of Mexico. Other unique North American festivals include mushroom festivals, ribfests, strawberry festivals and state fairs, the latter of which may feature attractions such as rodeos or trade fairs in the United States. The first was the New York State Fair, founded in 1841. Similar exhibitions are held in Canada, such as the Calgary Stampede, which debuted in 1886.

== Festivals of North America sublists ==
=== Type or topic ===
==== Food and folk ====
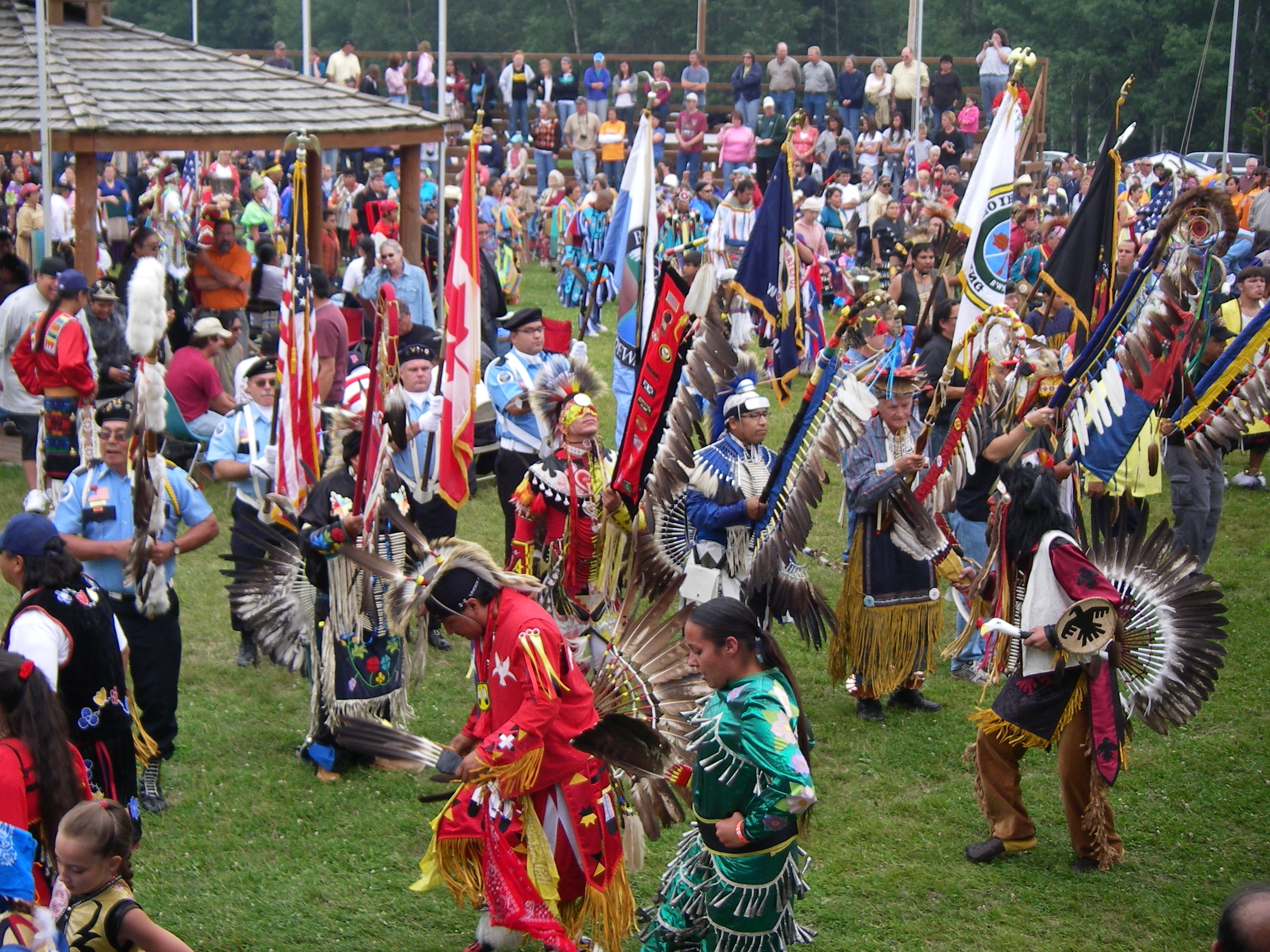
A Pow Wow in 2009, a folk festival and religious festival featuring dance and music.

- List of food and drink festivals in North America
- List of beer festivals in North America
- List of harvest festivals in the Americas
- List of vegetarian festivals by country
- List of folk festivals in North America
- List of Celtic festivals#North America

==== Agricultural or trade ====
- List of agricultural shows in North America
- List of dogwood festivals
- List of tulip festivals in the Americas
- List of strawberry festivals in the US

==== Arts ====
- List of literary festivals in North America
- List of film festivals in North and Central America
- Lists of music festivals by country
  - List of rock festivals in North America
  - List of folk festivals in North America
  - List of bluegrass festivals in North America
  - List of classical music festivals in North America
  - List of jazz festivals in the Americas

=== Sovereign states ===
==== Antigua and Barbuda ====
- Antigua Barbuda Global Music & Media Awards
- Antigua Carnival
- J'ouvert
- Romantic Rhythms Music Festival

==== Barbados ====
- Barbados Holetown Festival
- National Independence Festival of Creative Arts
- Crop Over
  - Bridgetown Market Street Fair
- Junkanoo
- Caribbean Festival of Arts
- Oistins Fish Festival
- Congaline Carnival
- Holder's Festival (arts and music)
- Barbados Jazz Festival (music)

==== The Bahamas ====
- Junkanoo (street parade)
- Caribbean Festival of Arts
- J'ouvert
- Junkanoo
- Holy Ship! (music)

==== Belize ====
- Street Art Festival in Belize City
- September Celebrations
- Junkanoo
- Belize International Film Festival (film)

==== Canada ====
- List of festivals in Canada
  - List of music festivals in Canada
  - List of film festivals in Canada

==== Costa Rica ====
- List of festivals in Costa Rica

==== Cuba ====
- Cuban Carnival
- Carnival of Santiago de Cuba
- Parrandas
- Caribbean Festival of Arts
- Havana's International Book Fair
- Havana Jam (music)
- Paz Sin Fronteras II (music)

==== Dominica ====
- J'ouvert
- Public holidays in Dominica

==== Dominican Republic ====
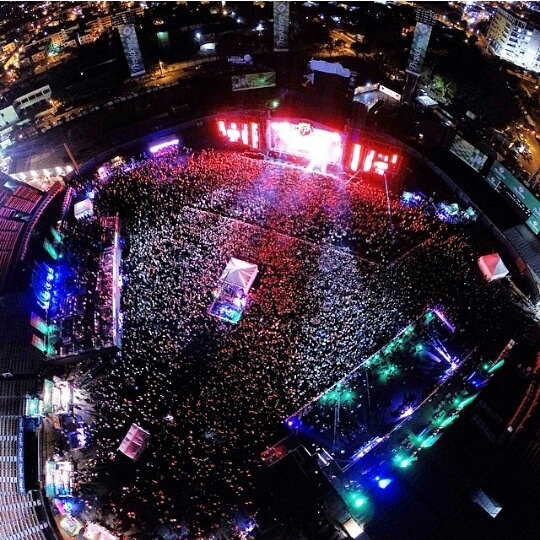
Large music festival in the Dominican Republic.

- Dominican Carnival
- Dominican Film Market (film)
- Barbarella (music)
- Concert for the Americas (music)
- Festival Presidente de la Musica Latina, Santo Domingo (music)

==== El Salvador ====
- Day of the Dead
- Fiesta de las Cruces
- Fiesta patronal
- Las Bolas de Fuego
- Public holidays in El Salvador

==== Grenada ====
- J'ouvert
- Public holidays in Grenada

==== Guatemala ====
- Carnival in Guatemala
- Fiesta de las Cruces
- Public holidays in Guatemala

==== Haiti ====
- Festival du Rhum Haiti
- Haitian Carnival
- Caribbean Festival of Arts
- Jacmel Film Festival (film)
- Port-au-Prince International Jazz Festival (music)

==== Honduras ====
- Junkanoo
- La Ceiba Carnival
- Public holidays in Honduras

==== Jamaica ====
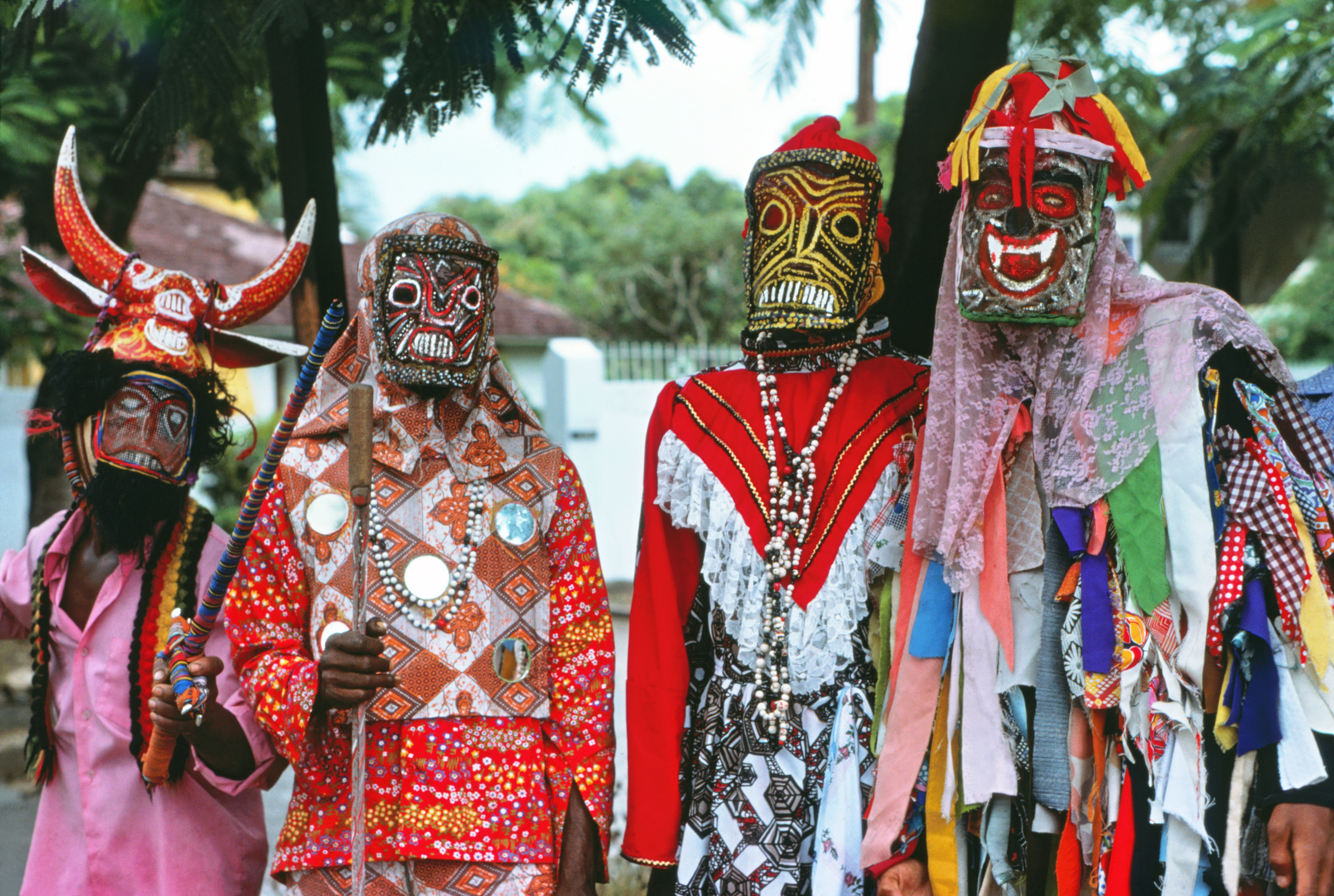
John Canoe dancers in Jamaica in December 1975

- Public holidays in Jamaica
- Jamaica Independence Festival (cultural and arts)
- Caribbean Carnival (folk and religious)
- Hosay (religious)
- Krishna Janmashtami (religious)
- Passa Passa (folk)
- John Canoe (folk)
- Caribbean Festival of Arts
- Reggae Film Festival
- Fun in the Son (gospel)
- Jamaica Jazz and Blues Festival (jazz and blues)
- One Love Peace Concert (reggae)
- Rock Boat (rock and electronic)
- Rebel Salute (reggae)
- Reggae Sumfest (reggae)
- Reggae Sunsplash (reggae)
- Smile Jamaica Concert (reggae)
- Wonder Dream Concert (reggae)

==== Mexico ====
- List of festivals in Mexico
  - List of film festivals in Mexico

==== Nicaragua ====
- Public holidays in Nicaragua

==== Panama ====
- Panama Jazz Festival (music)

==== Saint Kitts and Nevis ====
- Culturama
- La festival de Capisterre
- Caribbean Festival of Arts
- St. Kitts Music Festival (music)
- J'ouvert

==== Saint Lucia ====
- Public holidays in Saint Lucia
- Saint Lucia Jazz Festival (music)

==== Saint Vincent and the Grenadines ====
- J'ouvert
- Public holidays in Saint Vincent and the Grenadines

==== Trinidad and Tobago ====
- Calypso Monarch (music)
- Caribbean Festival of Arts
- Trinidad and Tobago Carnival
- Fiesta de las Cruces
- Hosay
- J'ouvert
- NGC Bocas Lit Fest
- Junkanoo
- Trinidad and Tobago Film Festival (film)

==== United States ====
- List of festivals in the United States
  - List of music festivals in the United States
  - List of film festivals in the United States

=== Dependencies and other territories ===
==== British Virgin Islands ====
- J'ouvert
- Public holidays in the British Virgin Islands

==== Cayman Islands ====
- Batabano
- Cayman Islands International Film Festival
- Junkanoo

==== Greenland ====
- Nuuk Pride

==== Guadeloupe ====
- Saint-Georges International Music Festival

==== Puerto Rico ====
- Carnaval de Ponce
- Día Mundial de Ponce
- Feria de Artesanías de Ponce
- Festival Nacional de la Quenepa
- Fiesta patronal
  - Fiestas patronales in Puerto Rico
- Graphopoli
- Las Mañanitas
- Salsa congress

===== Music festivals in Puerto Rico =====
- Casals Festival
- Fiesta Nacional de la Danza
- Mar y Sol Pop Festival
- Ponce Jazz Festival
- Radio y Musica Convention

==== Saint Barthélemy ====
- Caribbean Carnival
- St. Barth Film Festival

== See also ==
- Rock Boat (moveable music cruise)
- Lists of festivals
- Culture of North America
