= List of festivals in Mexico =

Festivals of Mexico
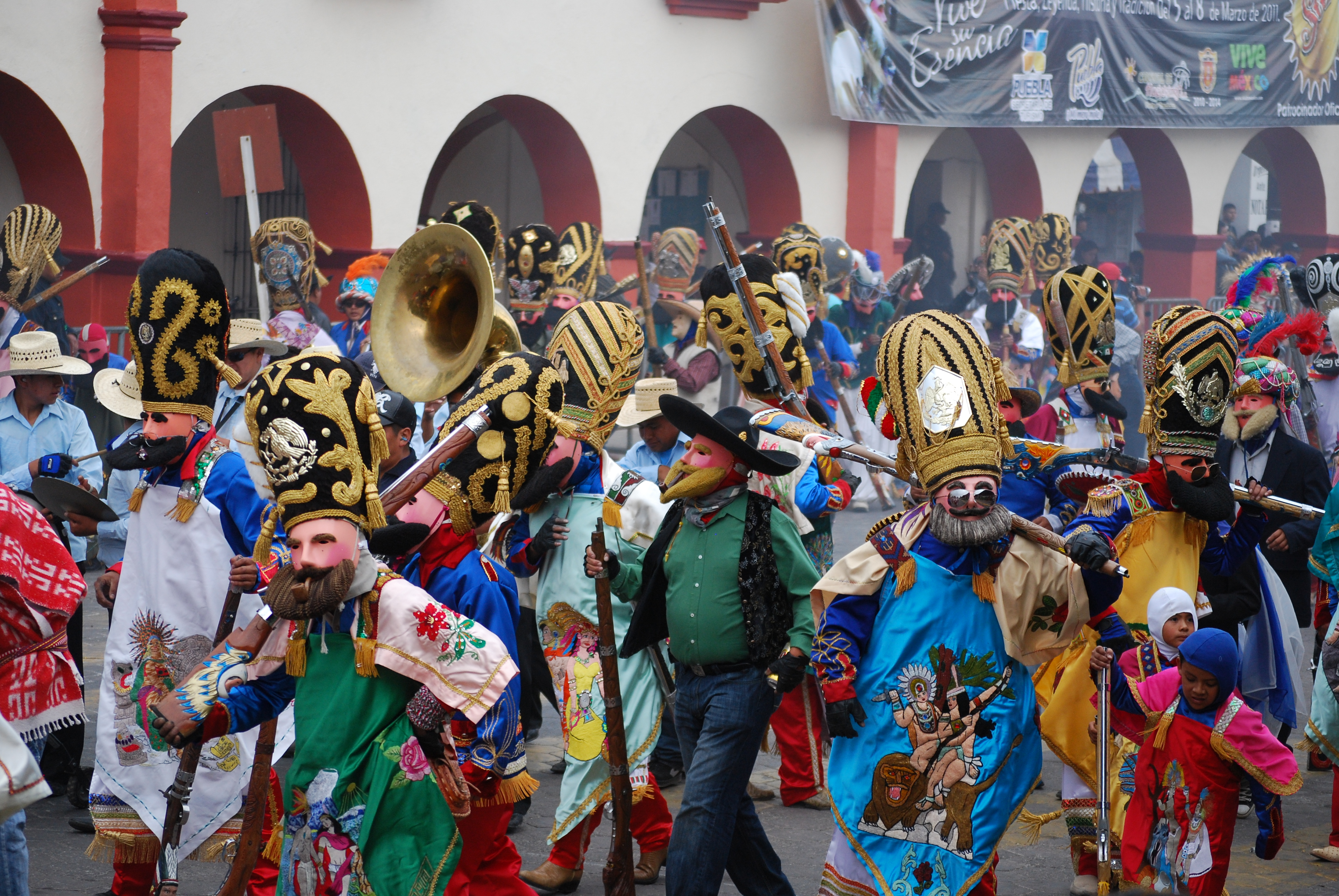

Regional types
- Carnival in Mexico

Related topics
- Festivals of North America; by country (United States; Cuba; Guatemala); culture of Mexico; tourism in Mexico; public holidays in Mexico

Notable festivals in Mexico include the folk and religious festivities of Day of the Dead.

== Festivals in Mexico ==
- Charro Days
- Festival Internacional Cervantino (theater)
- Fiestas of Nuevo León
- Fiestas Patrias
- Guelaguetza
- Night of the Radishes
- Sombrero Festival

=== Food ===
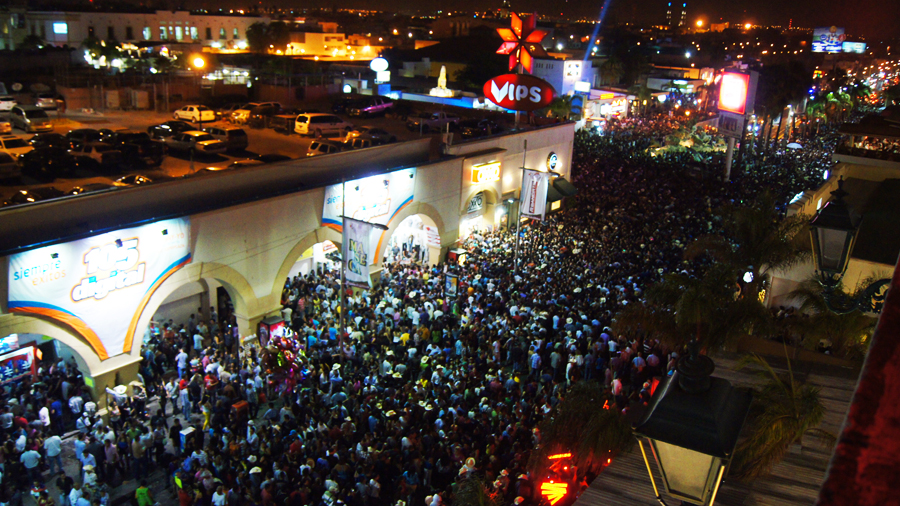
Feria Nacional de San Marcos 2012

- Puerto Vallarta festival
- Alfeñique fair
- Feria Nacional de San Marcos
- International Pasty Festival
- Night of the Radishes

=== Religious or folk ===
- Christmas in Mexico
  - Las Posadas
- Day of the Dead
- Aztec New Year
- Carnival in Mexico
- Carnival of Huejotzingo
- Carnivals of Iztapalapa
- Cozumel Carnival

=== Film ===
- Expresión en Corto International Film Festival
- FICCO
- Guadalajara International Film Festival
- Los Cabos International Film Festival
- Mexico City International Film Festival
- Morelia International Film Festival
- Oaxaca FilmFest
- Pantalla de Cristal Film Festival

=== Music ===
- Baja Prog
- The BPM Festival
- Electric Zoo
- Festival Rock y Ruedas de Avándaro
- Hell & Heaven Metal Fest
- NWEAMO
- Riviera Maya Jazz Festival
- Rock Boat
- RockOut Fest (formerly Maquinaria Festival)
- Vive Latino

== See also ==
- List of festivals in North America
- Culture of Mexico
- Tourism in Mexico
- Public holidays in Mexico
- Mexican fiestas in the United States
