= List of film festivals in North America =

This is a list of film festivals that take place (or took place) in North America.

== Canada ==
- List of film festivals in Canada

== Caribbean ==
Name	Est.	City	Country	Notes
Bahamas International Film Festival	2004	Nassau	Bahamas	
Cayman Islands International Film Festival	2015		Cayman Islands	
Dominican Film Market	2014	Santo Domingo	Dominican Republic	
Havana Film Festival	1979	Havana	Cuba	Held annually, focuses on Latin-American films.
Jacmel Film Festival	2004	Jacmel	Haiti	
Reggae Film Festival	2008	Kingston	Jamaica	
St. Barth Film Festival	1996		Saint Barthélemy	
Trinidad and Tobago Film Festival	2006	Port of Spain	Trinidad and Tobago	

== Central America ==
Name	Est.	City	Country	Notes
Belize International Film Festival	2003	Belize City	Belize	
Cine Pobre Film Festival	2003		Panama	

== Mexico ==
Name	Est.	City	State	Notes
Ambulante Documentary Film Festival	2006			Multiple locations
Cine Pobre Film Festival	2003			Multiple locations
Expresión en Corto International Film Festival	1997	San Miguel de Allende and Guanajuato	Guanajuato	Mexico's largest competitive film festival.
FotoFilm Tijuana	2017	Tijuana	Mexico	Includes narrative and documentary features and shorts, music program, educational forums, and other special events.
Guadalajara International Film Festival	1988	Guadalajara	Jalisco	Mexico and Latin American film festival
Los Cabos International Film Festival	2012	Los Cabos	Baja California Sur	
Mexico City International Film Festival	2011	Mexico City	Mexico	
Mexico City International Contemporary Film Festival	2004	Mexico City	Mexico	Also known as FICCO (Festival Internacional de Cine Contemporáneo), it is hosted by Cinemex.
Morelia International Film Festival	2003	Morelia	Michoacan	
Oaxaca FilmFest	2010	Oaxaca	Oaxaca	
Pantalla de Cristal Film Festival	1999	Mexico City	Mexico	
Shorts México	2006	Mexico City	Mexico	

== United States ==
- List of film festivals in the United States

== See also ==
- List of film festivals
