= Lists of festivals =

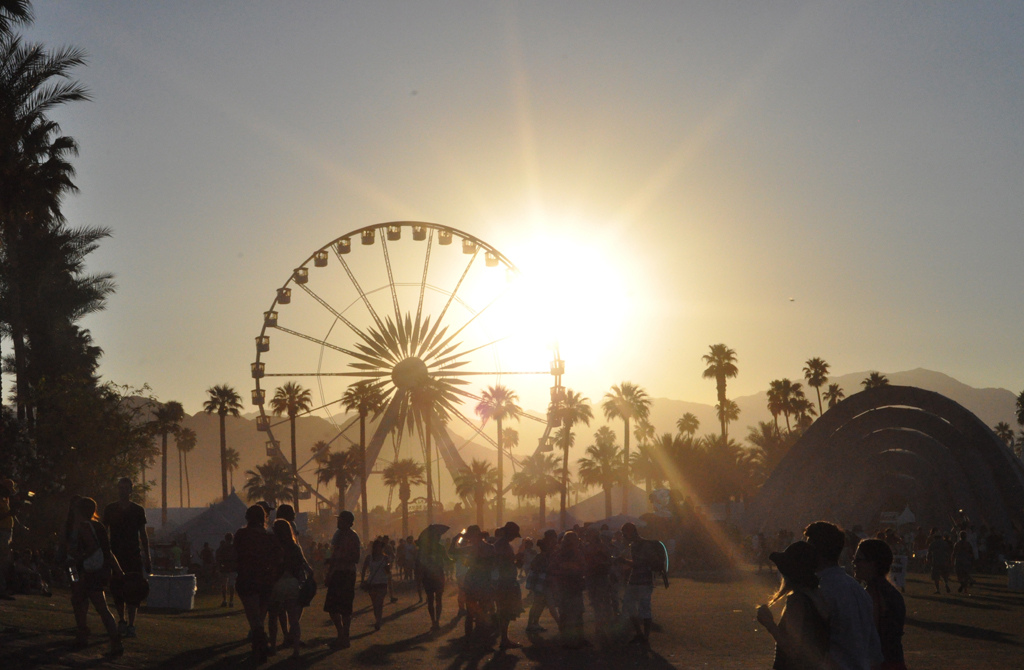
Sunset at Coachella, one of the most attended music and arts festivals in the world.

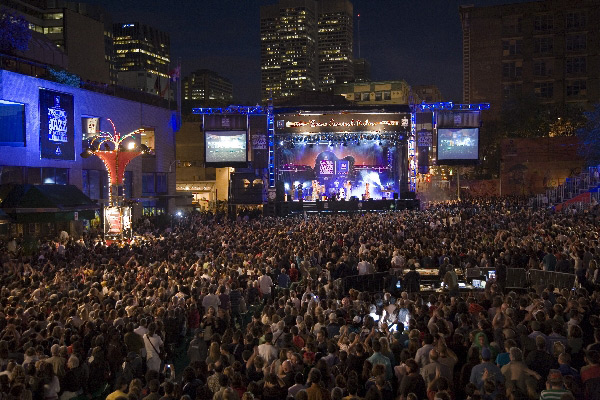
The Montreal International Jazz Festival is the most attended annual festival in the world.

This is a list of festival-related list articles on Wikipedia. A festival is an event of the ordinarily staged by a community, centering on and celebrating some unique aspect of that community and its traditions, often marked as a local or national holiday, mela, or eid. A festival is a special occasion of feasting or celebration, usually with a religious focus. Aside from religion, and sometimes folklore, another significant origin is agricultural. Food (and consequently agriculture) is so vital that many festivals are associated with harvest time. Religious commemoration and thanksgiving for good harvests are blended in events that take place in autumn such as Halloween in the northern hemisphere and Easter in the southern.

== Country and region ==
- List of festivals in Australia
- List of festivals in Bangladesh
- List of festivals in Canada
  - List of festivals in Alberta
  - List of festivals in British Columbia
  - List of festivals in Manitoba
  - List of festivals in Ontario
  - List of festivals in Quebec
  - List of festivals in Saskatchewan
- List of festivals in China
- List of festivals in Colombia
- List of festivals in Costa Rica
- List of festivals in Denmark
- List of festivals in Estonia
- List of festivals in Fiji
- List of festivals in Finland
- List of festivals in Ghana
- List of festivals in India
  - List of festivals in Andhra Pradesh
  - List of festivals in West Bengal
- List of festivals in Indonesia
- List of festivals in Iran
- List of festivals in the Isle of Man
- List of festivals in Japan
  - List of festivals in Aomori Prefecture
- List of festivals in Laos
- List of festivals in Mexico
- List of festivals in Morocco
- List of festivals in Nepal
- List of festivals in Nigeria
- List of festivals in North Macedonia
- List of festivals in Pakistan
- List of festivals in Paraguay
- List of festivals in the Philippines
- List of festivals in Portugal
- List of festivals in Qatar
- List of festivals in Romania
- List of festivals in Singapore
- List of festivals in South Korea
- List of festivals in Sri Lanka
- List of festivals in Taiwan
- List of festivals in Tunisia
- List of festivals in Turkey
- List of festivals in the United Kingdom
  - List of festivals in Wales
- List of festivals in the United States
  - List of festivals in California
  - List of festivals in Florida
  - List of festivals in Georgia (U.S. state)
  - List of festivals in Louisiana
  - List of festivals in Michigan
  - List of festivals in New Jersey
  - List of festivals in North Carolina
  - List of festivals in Pennsylvania
  - List of festivals in Utah
  - List of festivals in Virginia
  - List of festivals in West Virginia
- List of festivals in Vietnam

== Continent ==
- List of festivals in Asia
- List of festivals in Europe
- List of festivals in Oceania
- List of festivals in North America
- List of festivals in South America

== Sublists by type or topic ==
=== Cultural, Religious, and/or Folk ===
The following lists are for cultural festivals by culture, with location of origin:

- List of Bohol festivals (Philippines)
- List of Buddhist festivals
- List of Caribbean carnivals around the world
- Festivals of Cebu (Philippines)
- List of Celtic festivals (Ireland and United Kingdom)
- List of Christian music festivals (Europe)
- Cornish festivals (United Kingdom)
- List of Feria (Spain)
- List of folk festivals
- List of Hindu festivals (India and Pakistan)
- List of Hindu festivals in Maharashtra (India)
- List of Muslim festivals (Asia)
- List of neo-pagan festivals and events
- List of Sikh festivals (India and Pakistan)
- List of Sindhi Hindu festivals (India and Pakistan)
- Tibetan festivals (Tibet)

=== Fairs, expositions, and shows ===
- List of world expositions
- List of world's fairs
- List of steam fairs
- List of Renaissance and Medieval fairs

=== Sporting ===
- List of hot air balloon festivals
- List of kite festivals

=== Theater, dance, and performing arts ===
- List of opera festivals
- List of theatre festivals
  - List of improvisational theater festivals

=== Music ===
- List of music festivals
  - List of music festivals by year
  - List of music festivals by genre
  - List of music festivals by region

=== Film and television ===
- List of television festivals
- List of film festivals
  - List of architecture film festivals
  - List of documentary film festivals
  - List of fantastic and horror film festivals
  - List of machinima festivals
  - List of international animation festivals
  - List of regional animation festivals

=== Food and drink ===
- List of food festivals in the United Kingdom
  - List of food festivals in Wales
- List of Sauerkraut Days celebrations
- List of vegetarian festivals

=== Seasonal ===
- List of winter festivals

=== Flower and garden ===
- List of dogwood festivals
- List of tulip festivals

== See also ==
- Lists of tourist attractions
- Outline of festivals
- Patronal festival
- List of lists of lists
