= Brad Spencer =

Brad Spencer may refer to:

- Brad Spencer (American football) (born c. 1981), American college football coach
- Brad Spencer (1942–2015), founder of the Mushroom Mardi Gras Festival
- Brad Spencer (footballer) (born 1996), Scottish footballer
