= List of Christian music festivals =

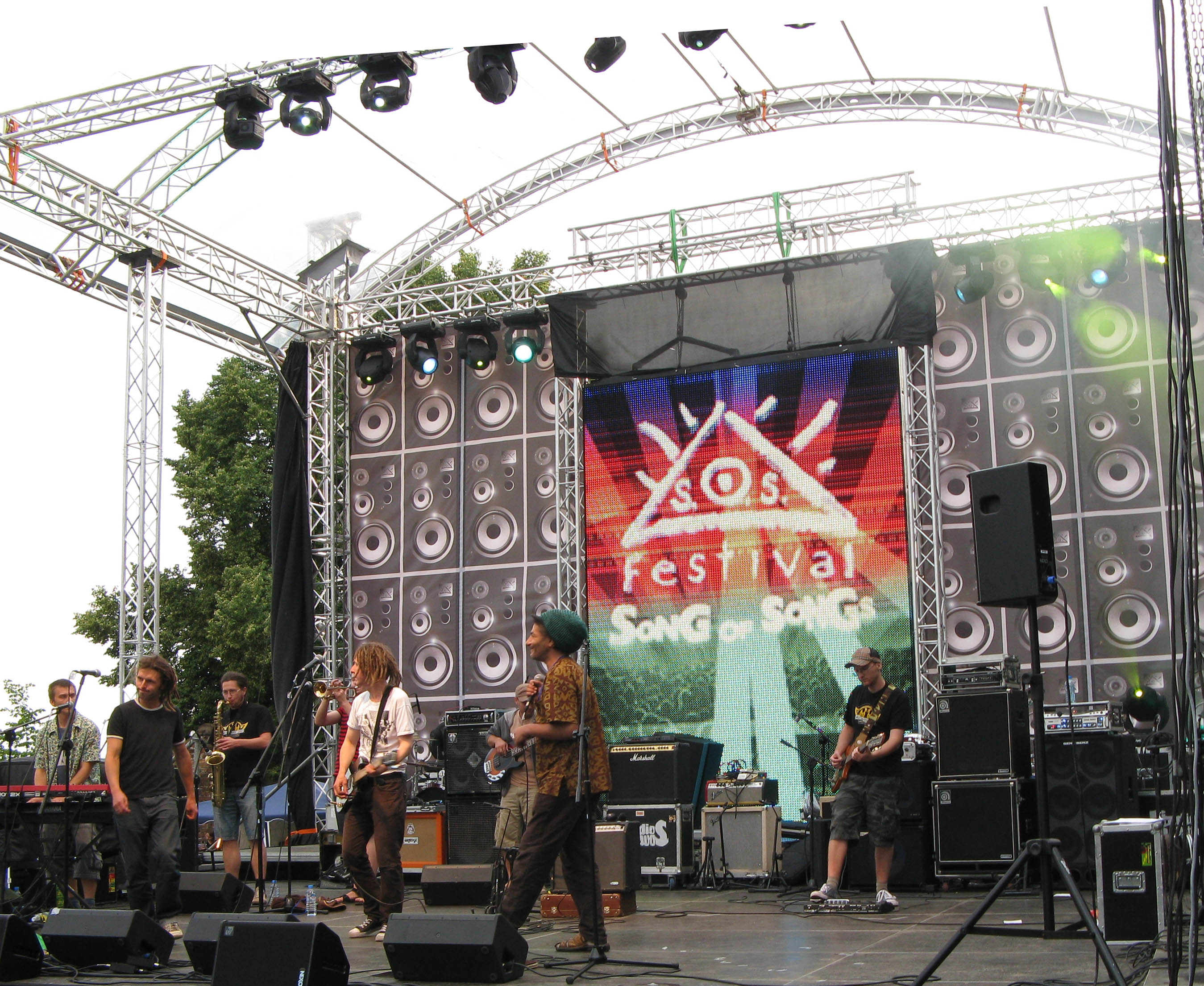

General Information
- Related genres: Christian music
- Location: Worldwide
- Related events: Music festival, concert tour, classical music festival, rock festival

A list of Christian music festivals around the world. A Christian music festival is a festival oriented towards genres of Christian music, such as gospel music, church music, liturgical music, or contemporary Christian music such as Christian pop and Christian rock. Festivals are held worldwide, and in North America many are overseen by organizations such as the Christian Festival Association.

== Festivals by country ==
=== Australia ===
- Australian Gospel Music Festival

=== Austria ===
- KEY2LIFE Festival

=== Brazil ===
- Halleluya Festival

=== Canada ===
- Canada Berries Gospel Music Festival
- Canada's Gospel Music Festival
- Festival of Praise
- No Greater Love Music Festival
- Toronto Christian Music Festival

=== Finland ===
- Joensuun Gospel Festival
- Maata Näkyvissä
- VappuGospel

=== Germany ===
- Christmas Rock Night
- Loud and Proud Festival

=== Israel ===
- Gallelujah

=== Italy ===
- Sanremo Christian Song Festival
- Euro Christian Music festival

=== Netherlands ===
- Cloud Festival
- EO Jongerendag
- Flevo Festival (now defunct)
- Graceland Festival
- Opwekking Pentecost festival
- Peacedog Festival (now defunct)

=== Portugal ===
- GodTellers

=== Switzerland ===
- Big Boss' Festival

=== United Kingdom ===
- BigChurchDayOut
- Greenbelt Festival
- Creation Fest

=== United States ===
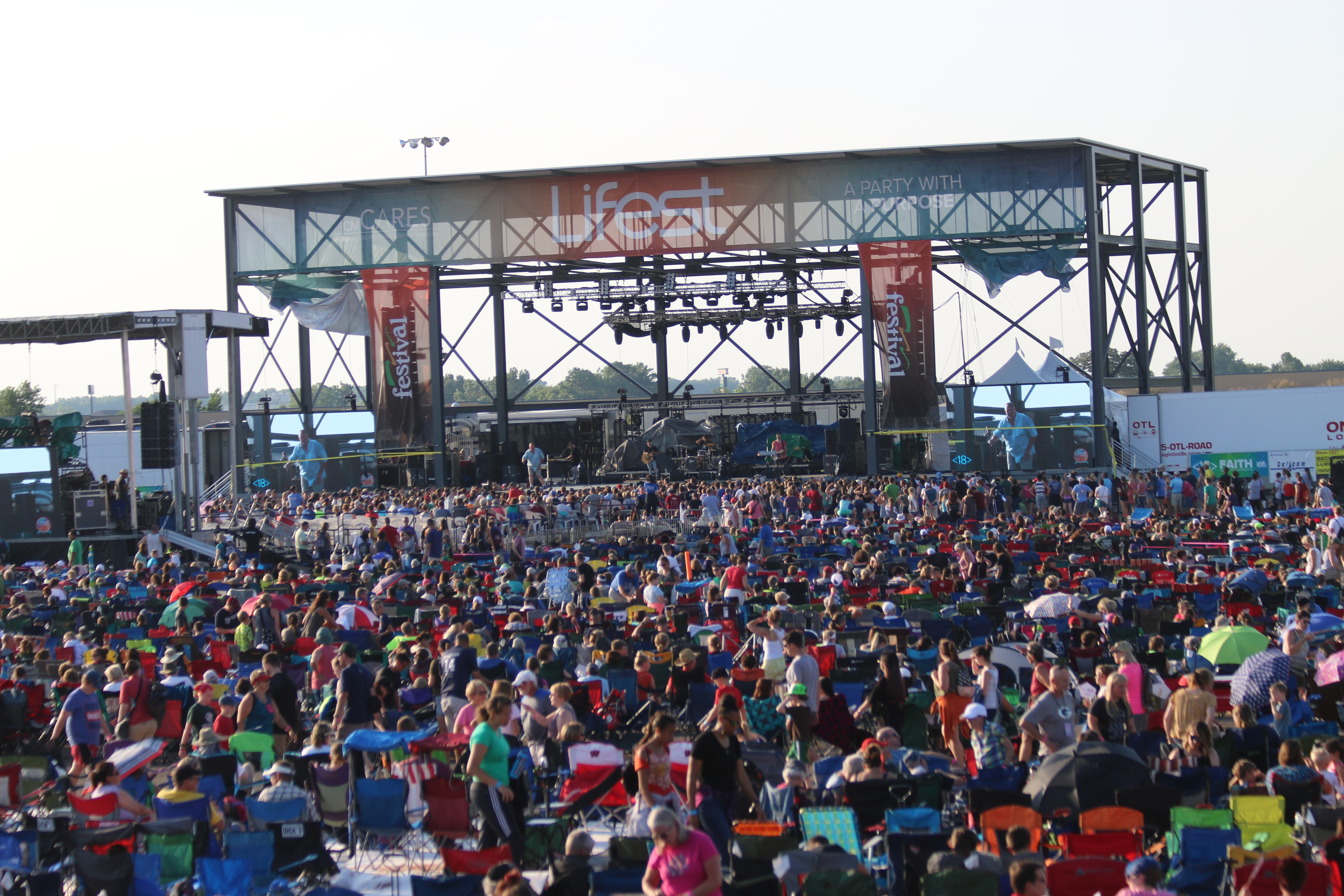
Lifest

- Agape Music Festival
- Alive Festival
- Clover Festival in Traverse City, Michigan
- Cornerstone Florida
- Connect Fest – Jaffrey, NH
- Elevate Music Festival – Scottsdale, AZ
- Faithfest – Wilkesboro, NC
- Greater Klamath CityFest – Klamath Falls, OR
- HeavenFest
- Hillfest – New Ipswich, NH
- Hills Alive – Rapid City, SD
- Illumination Festival – Greenville, OH
- Kingdom Bound – Buffalo, NY
- Legacy Five Wisconsin Gospel Music Festival
- Lifest
- LifeLight - Sioux Falls, SD
- Light the Way - Thunder Ridge - Ridgedale, MO
- Light the Way - Olive Branch, MI
- Rural Music Festival Isle, MN
- Off The Charts Music Festival – Cavalier, ND
- One Fest – Chippewa Falls, WI
- Resound Festival – Bethany, MO
- Risefest – Sheldon, IA
- Rock The Pines - Mineola, TX
- Rock The Universe – Orlando, FL
- SonRise – Virginia Beach, VA
- Soulfest – Northfield, MA
- STARfest - Fort Wayne, IN
- Unity Festival – Muskegon, MI
- Uprise Festival – Shippensburg, PA

== Gallery ==
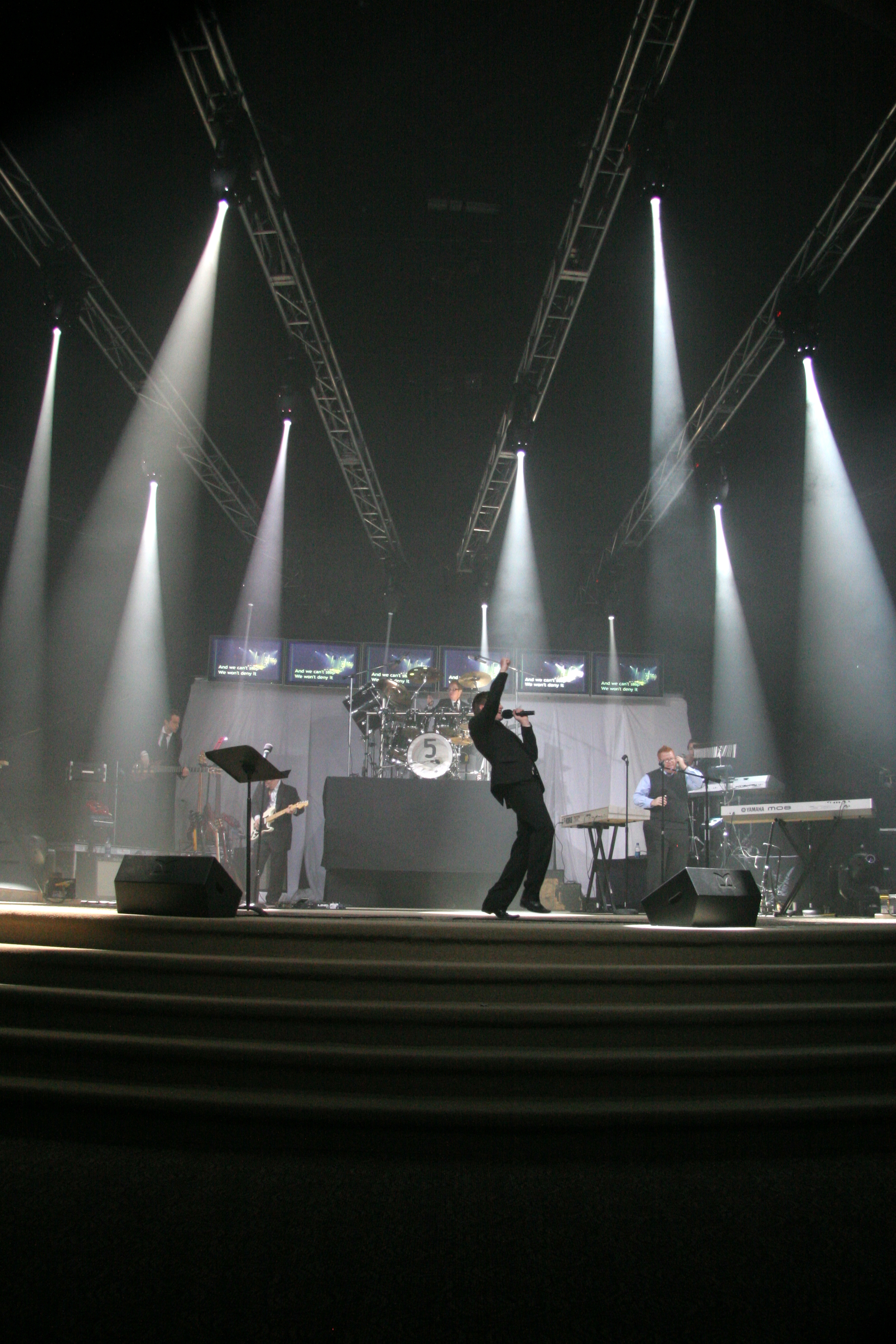

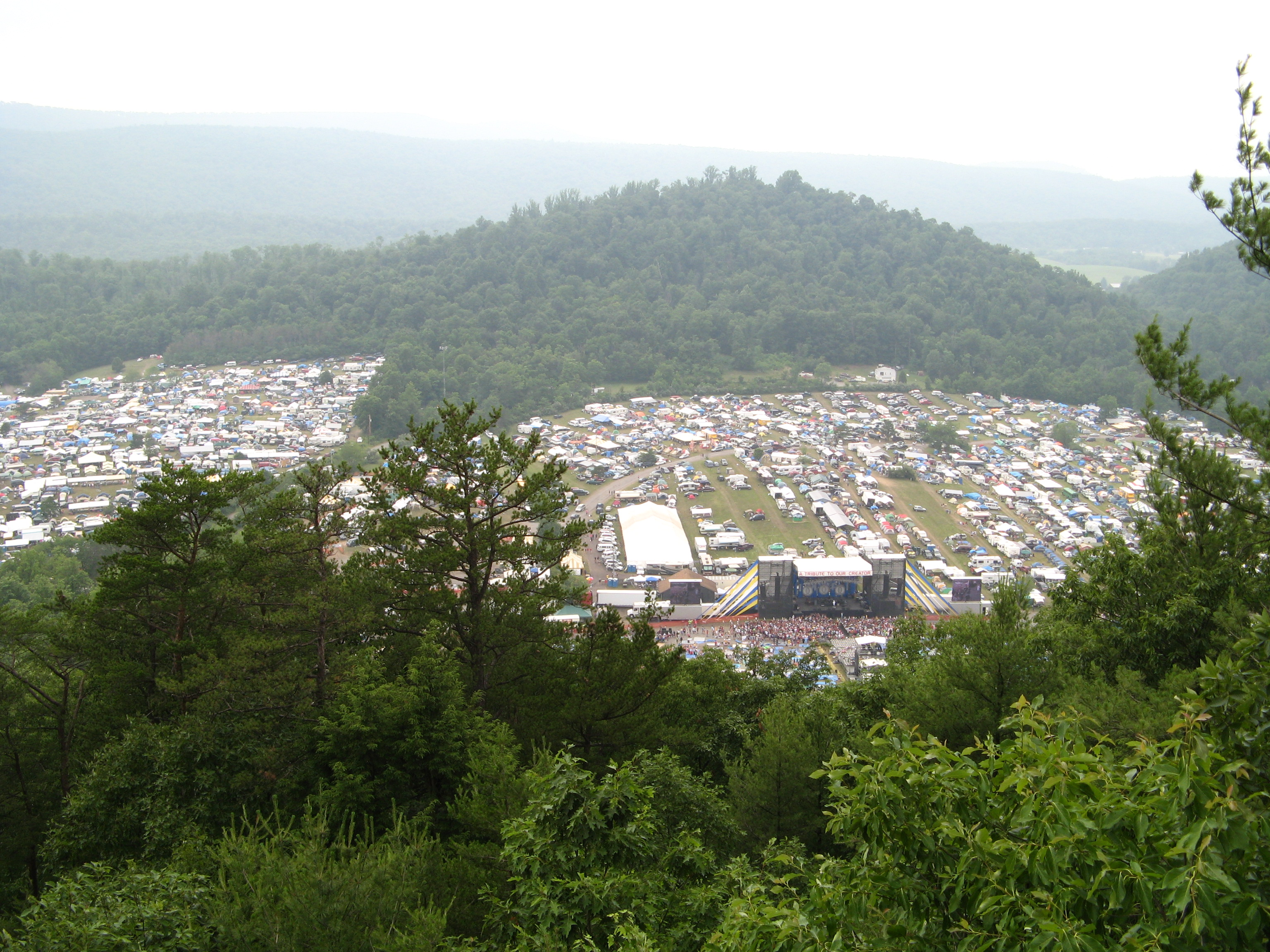

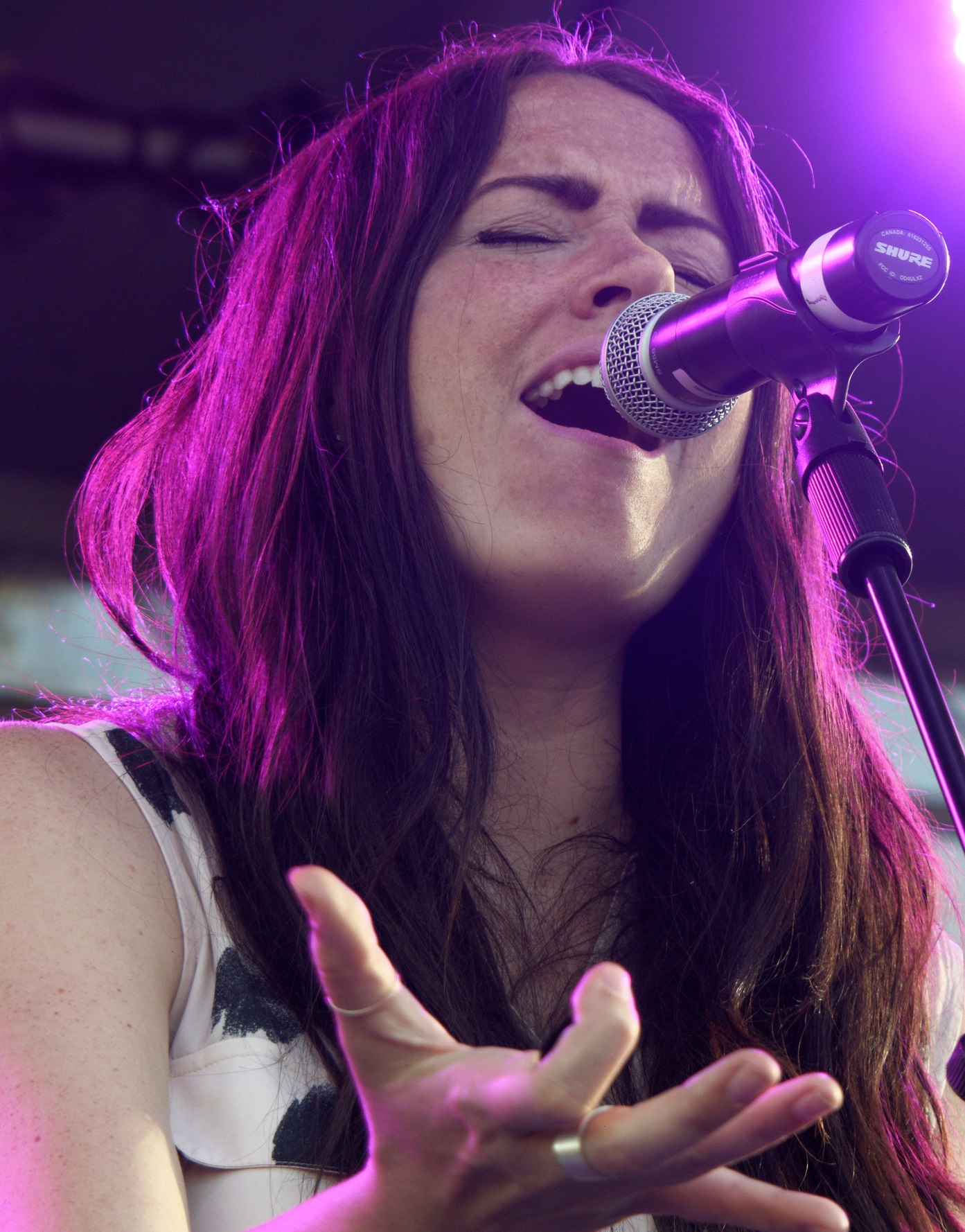

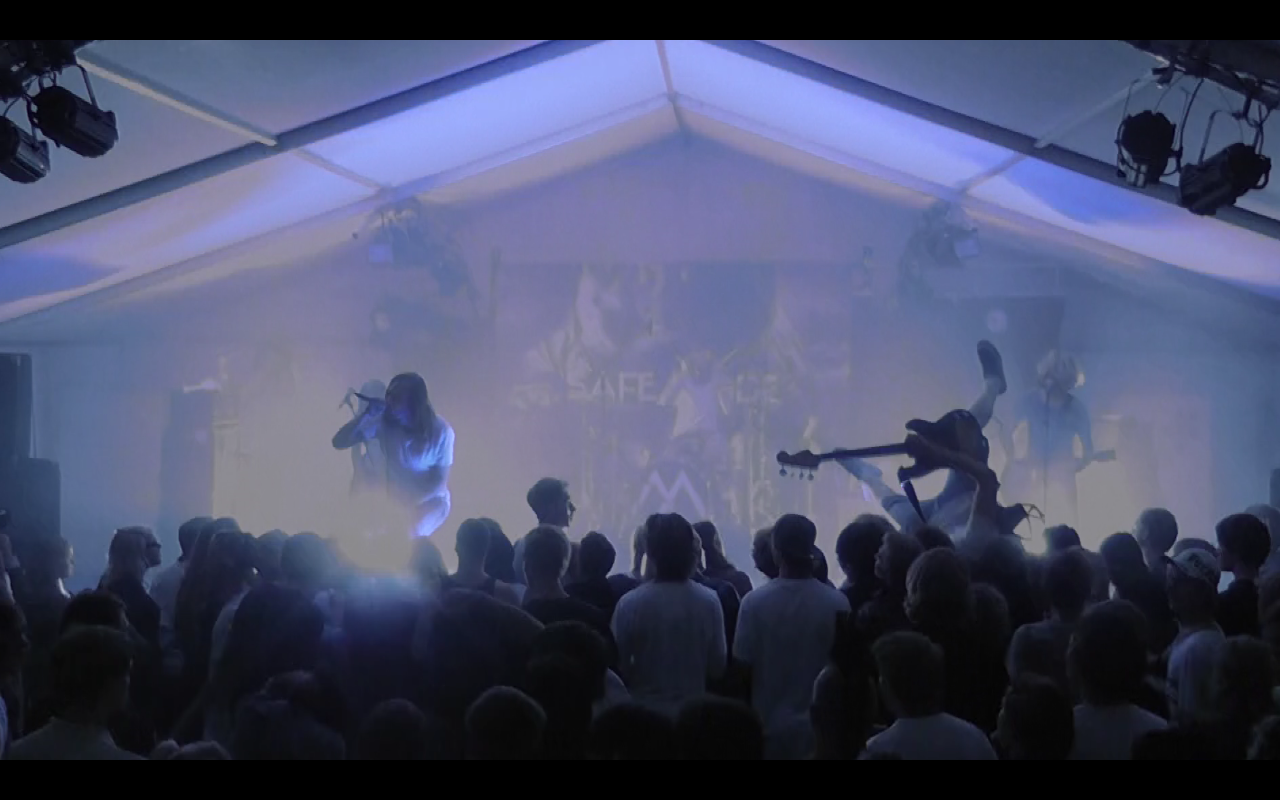

== See also ==
Christian Festival Association

- List of gospel music festivals
- List of festivals
- Lists of festivals – festival list articles on Wikipedia
- Christian music
- List of Christian bands and artists by genre
