= Night of the Radishes =

Annual event in Oaxaca, Mexico

Night of the Radishes Noche de Rábanos
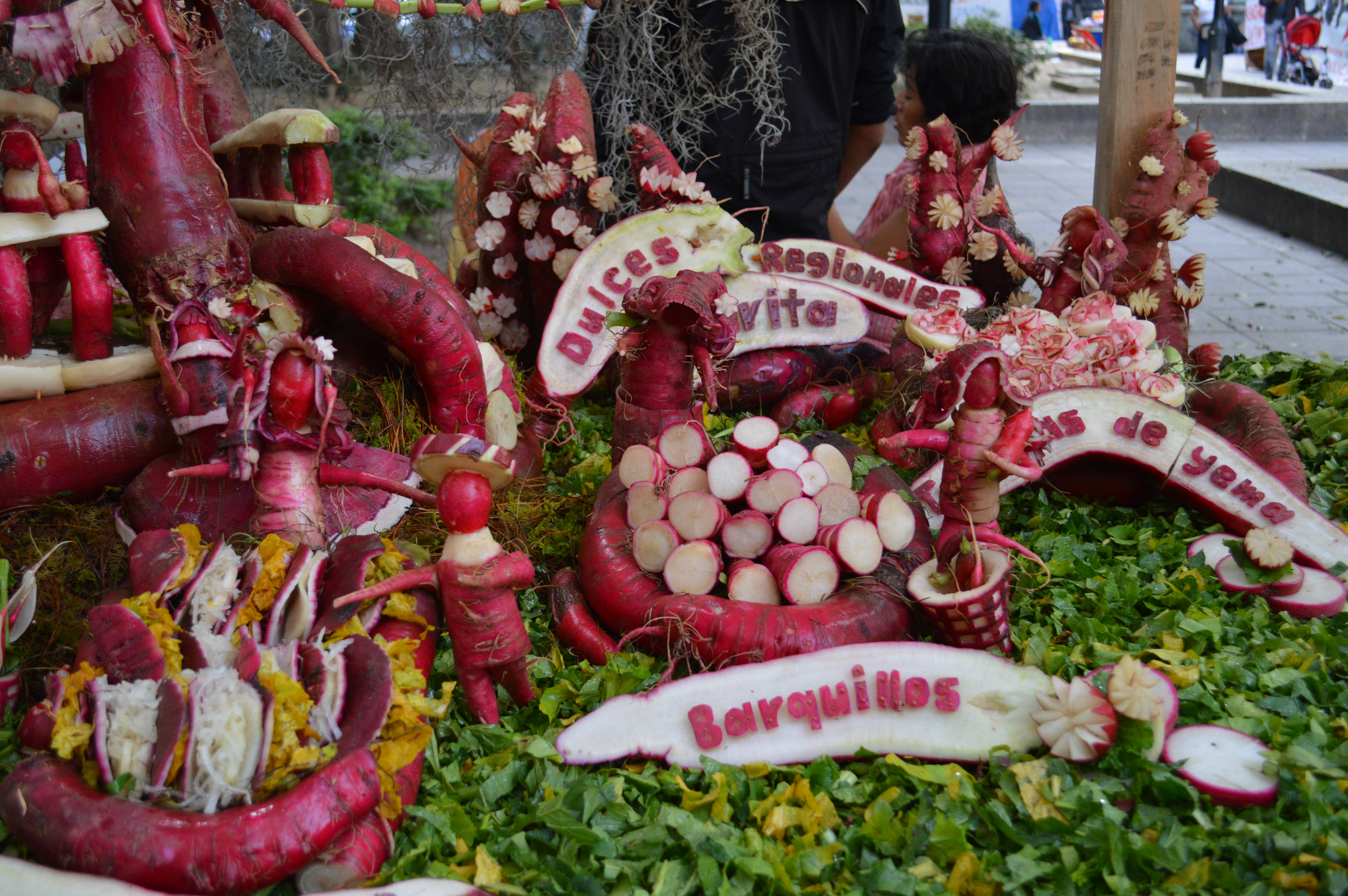
- Dulces Tradicionales Oaxaqueños entry at the 2014 Night of the Radishes
- Genre: Event
- Date: December 23
- Frequency: Annually
- Location: Oaxaca City
- Inaugurated: December 23, 1897
- Major events: Carving of oversized radishes

The Night of the Radishes (Spanish: Noche de Rábanos) is an annual event held on December 23 in Oaxaca, Mexico, dedicated to the carving of oversized radishes (Raphanus sativus) to create scenes that compete for prizes in various categories.

The event has its origins in the colonial period when radishes were introduced by the Spanish. Oaxaca has a long wood carving tradition and farmers began carving radishes into figures as a way to attract customers' attention at the Christmas market, which was held in the main square on December 23. In 1897, the city instituted the formal competition. As the city has grown, the government has had to dedicate land to the growing of the radishes used for the event, supervising their growth and distribution to competitors. The event has become very popular, attracting over 100 contestants and thousands of visitors. Since the radishes wilt soon after cutting, the works can only be displayed for a number of hours, which has led to very long lines for those wishing to see them. The event also has displays and competitions for works made with corn husks and dried flowers, which are created with the same themes as those with radishes.

== Origins ==
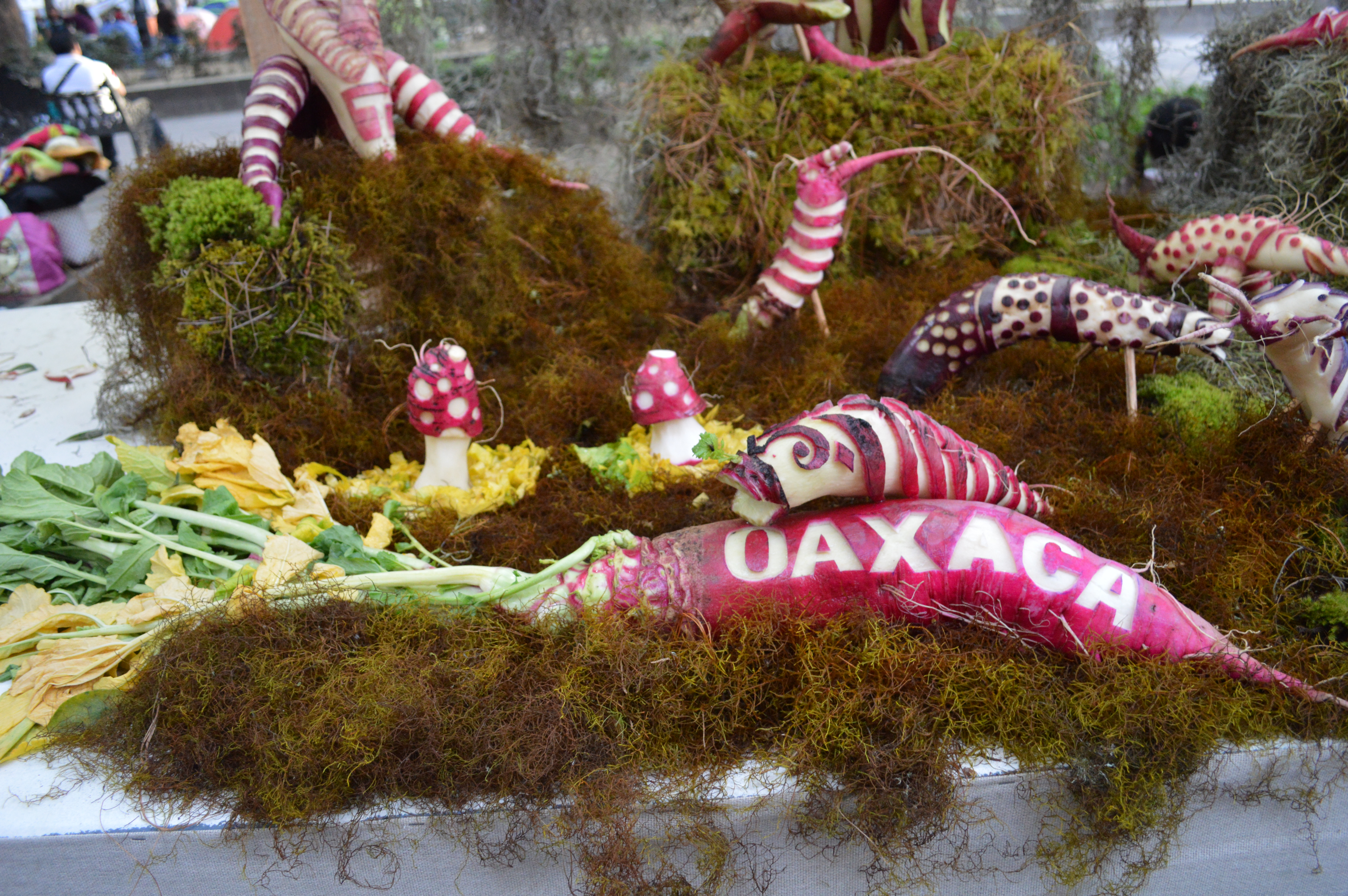
From Alebrijes

Native to China, radishes were introduced to Mexico by the Spanish, particularly by the friars. Over time, the crop became used as a side dish or snack, or carved into decorations for special dishes. In the colonial period, the radishes began to be carved with religious themes in relation to the annual Christmas market held in the city of Oaxaca on December 23, with the encouragement of priests. The carvings were a marketing gimmick, with farmers using them to attract the attention of shoppers in the market in the city plaza. Eventually people began buying the radishes not only to eat, but to create centerpieces for Christmas dinners.

The legend as to how the event began says that one year in the mid-18th century, the radish crop was so abundant that a section lay unharvested for months. In December, two friars pulled up some of these forgotten radishes. The sizes and shapes were amusing, and they brought them as curiosities to the Christmas market held on December 23. The misshapen vegetables attracted attention and soon they began to be carved to give them a wider variety of shapes and figures.

In 1897, the mayor of the city, Francisco Vasconcelos, decided to create a formal radish-carving competition, which has been held each year since.

Over the years various types of radishes have been used both in Oaxacan cuisine and for carving. A large completely white type called criollo was used earlier, as it did not rot as readily and adopted more capricious forms. While this variety has since disappeared, an image of them can be seen in a work by Diego Rivera called "Las tentaciones de San Antonio".

== Modern competition ==
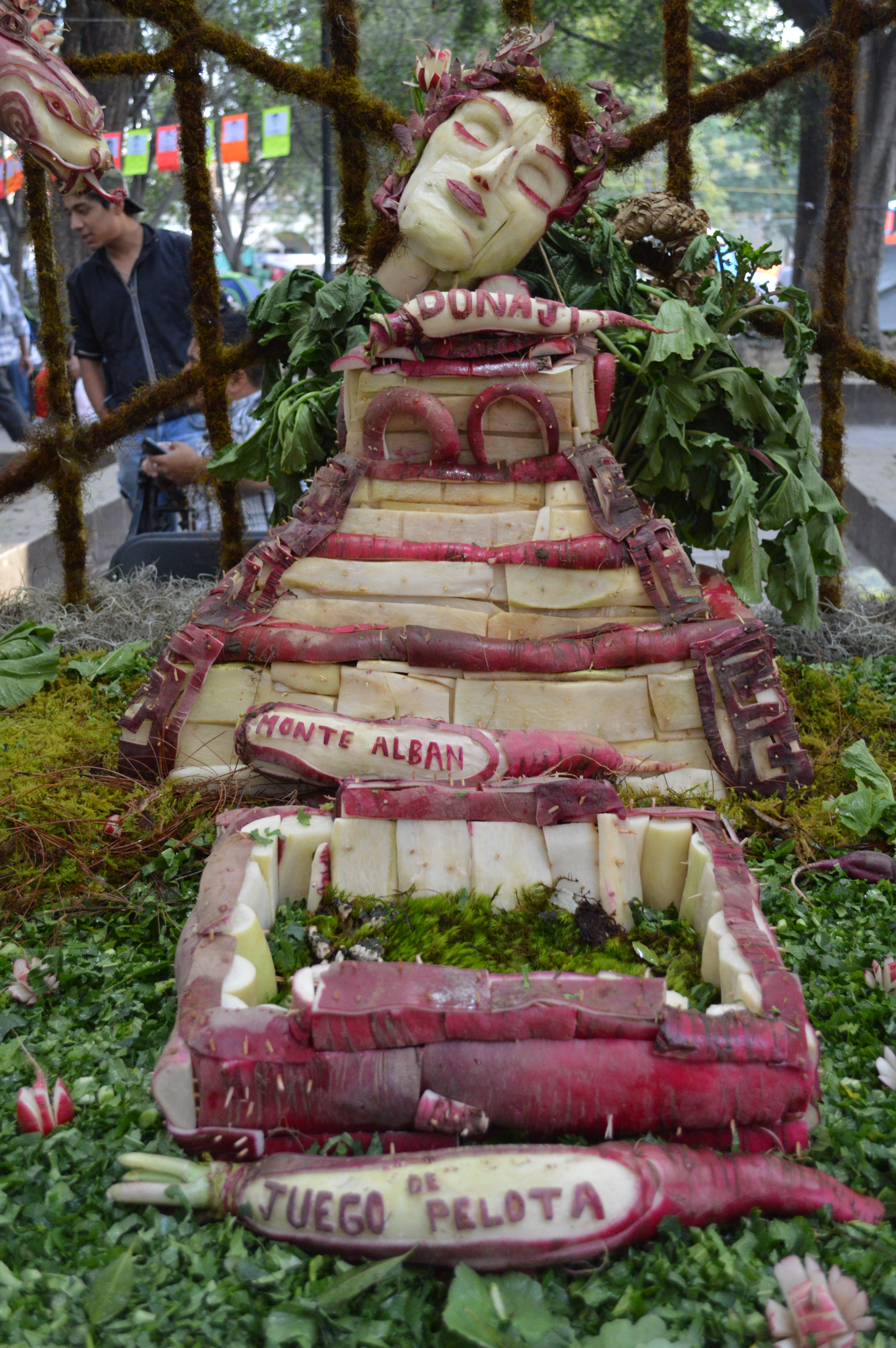
From Soy Oaxaca

The formal Noche de Rábanos competition focuses on the carving of radishes, which can be embellished with other elements. Most entries are scenes that use multiple radishes, with the most traditional being nativity scenes. However, over the 100+ years that the competition has been held, there has been significant diversification in the entries. Common scenes are related to life in Oaxaca such as the Guelaguetza, posadas, calendas (a kind of traditional party), Day of the Dead, Danza de la Pluma, Pineapple Harvest Dance and the Chilena from the Costa Chica, Oaxacan history and folklore as well as the veneration of Our Lady of Guadalupe, Our Lady of Juquila and Our Lady of Solitude, the patron of the state. However, they can also depict other themes such as non-Christmas Biblical stories and can even be in protest. The most common elements are the people, animals, food and handcrafts of the state, but they can also include duendes, snowmen, monsters and more.

Originally the radishes used by competitors were those raised by local farmers, but as the city has grown, taking over land traditionally dedicated to their cultivation, the municipal government has stepped in. It has allocated an area near El Tequio Park to their cultivation, specially grown for the event. They are heavily fertilized, chemically treated and left in the ground long after normal harvests to allow them to reach monumental sizes and capricious shapes, which also makes them unsuitable for human consumption. The resulting vegetables can be up to fifty centimeters in length, ten centimeters or wider and can weigh up to three kilos. In 2014, twelve tons of radishes were harvested for that event alone. Local authorities monitor the harvest and distribute the crop to registered contestants on December 18. The radish currently used has a red skin and a white interior. The use of this radish, which is softer than other varieties, has precipitated a number of strategies different from those used in the past, one being the use of the contrast between the skin and the interior and the other to peel and flatten the red skin for use as clothing items, flags and more. Typically participants use knives and toothpicks to create the sculptures, after the tops of the radishes with their long, green leaves have been cut off (and sometimes used in the scenes) . Although the carving of radishes evolved from the area's tradition of wood carving, the current competition does not attract current woodcarvers as the material is very different.

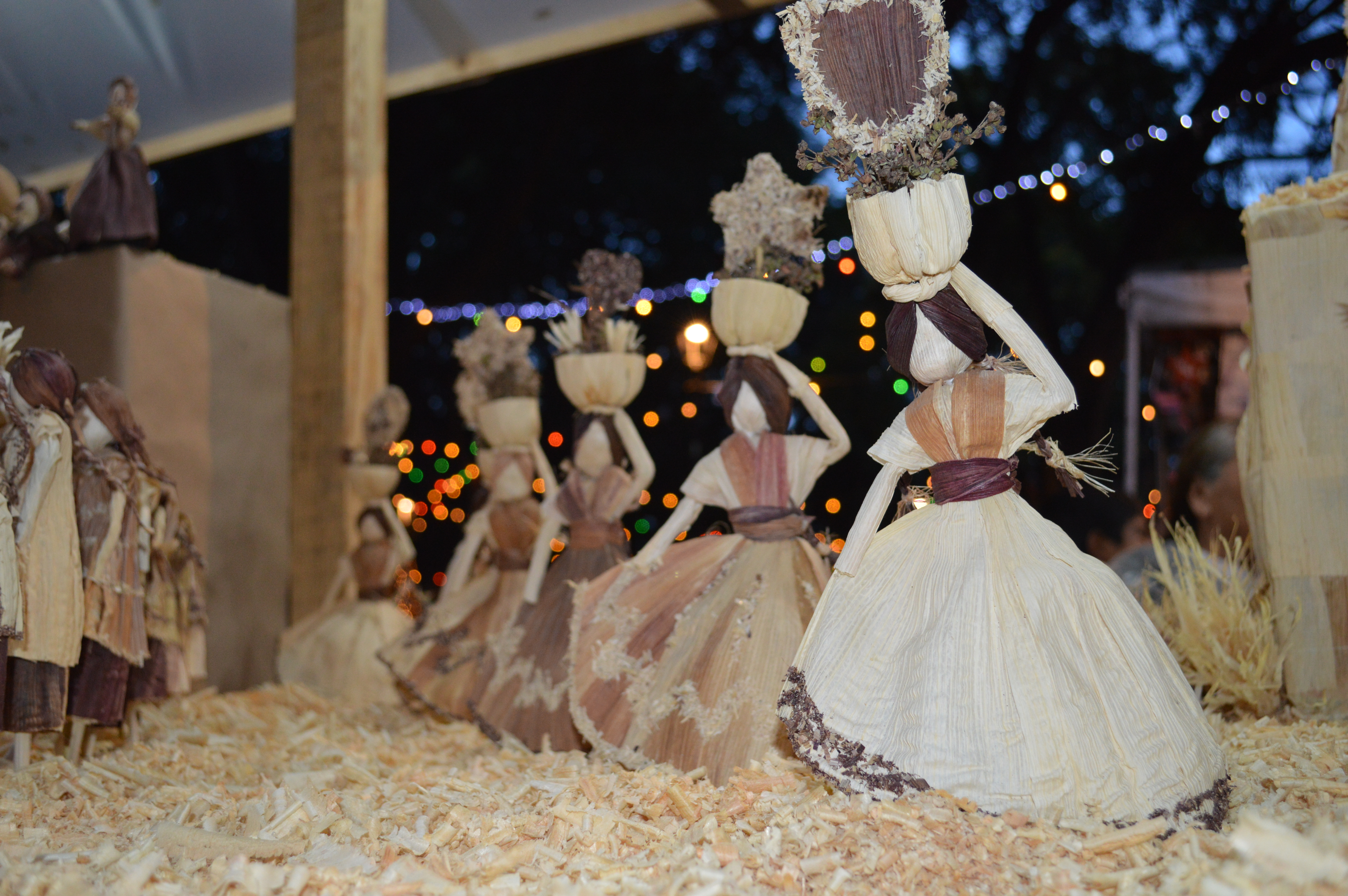
Corn husk figures from Oaxaca y sus regiones

The event attracts over 100 participants from the city of Oaxaca and neighboring communities, especially San Antonino Velazco. In 2014, 94 competed in the adult categories, along with 61 youth and 50 children. Contestants register months in advance and from the 18th to the 23rd they must plan and design their scenes, generally using the natural shapes of the radishes they have been allotted as a guide. The actual carving and assembly of the entries occurs during the day of December 23. There are several categories of participation. For adults, radish sculptures and scenes can be in the traditional or "free" category, which is determined by the theme. Works in the traditional category are for depictions of nativity scenes and those of Oaxacan traditions. Those in the free category generally depict more contemporary themes. However, as the function of the event is to preserve tradition, the grand prize of 15,000 pesos is awarded to the winner of the traditional category. In 2014 the grand prize winner was the entry "Dulces Regionales Oaxaqueños" by the Vasquez Lopez family. There are also prizes for participants competing as novices, and a children's category for those aged from six to seventeen to encourage new generations to continue the tradition. Prizes for the children's categories include bicycles and school supplies. The event has also added categories for scenes made not from radishes but instead from dried corn husks (called totomoxtle) and those made with a dried flower called "flor inmortal" (immortal flower) named such as it dries quickly and keeps most of its color. These entries also have several subcategories and generally have similar themes to those done with radishes.

Since the radishes do not keep after they are cut and quickly wilt, the entire event lasts only for a number of hours from the late afternoon to early evening of December 23, with stands set up the morning before around the main square of the city and taken down the morning after. Visitors are permitted to pass by the stands starting in the late afternoon, with judging and the awarding of prizes taking place at about 9 pm, with the radish sculptures removed shortly after that. The event has become popular, attracting thousands of visitors as well as functionaries that can include the state's governor. Despite the creation of a two-line system (the one behind on a raised platform) for visitors to file by the stands, wait times can be as long as 4–5 hours to see the entries.

== See also ==
- Christmas in Mexico
