= Fabrizio Venturi =

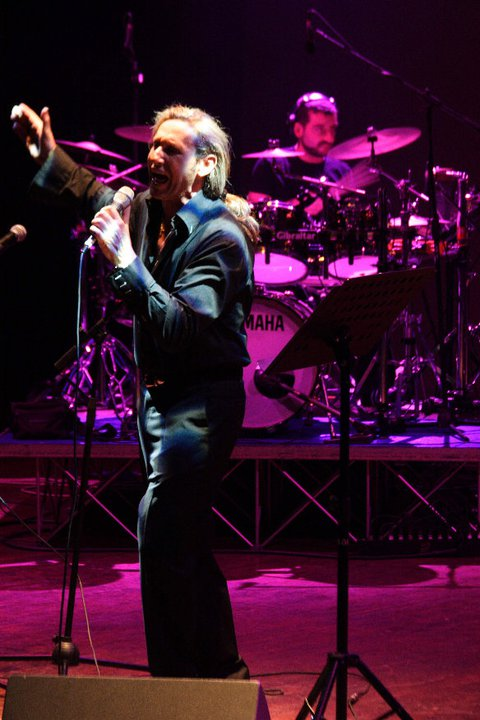

Background information
- Born: September 24, 1969 (age 57); Florence, Italy
- Occupations: Singer, pianist and festival organizer

Fabrizio Venturi (Florence, 24 September, 1969) is an Italian pianist, singer-songwriter, and organizer of the Sanremo Christian Song Festival. Fabrizio Venturi began his musical career at the age of 13 years old, with his first instruments being the guitar and piano. Six years later, in 1988, he graduated in advertising graphics at the State Art Institute of Florence (now the Statal Liceo artistico of Porta Romana) and practiced for several years the profession of graphic designer at the same time, whilst also pursuing his career as a singer. Starting from 1984, he has participated in music competitions, and between 1986 and 1992, he took part in musical events in Italy and abroad, such as in the US, Germany , and Benelux.

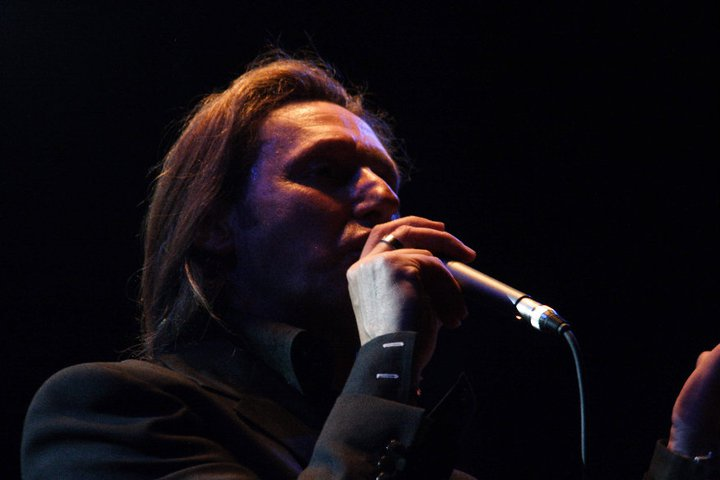
Fabrizio Venturi during a concert

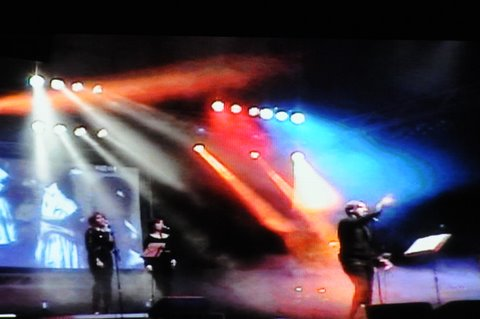
Fabrizio on a stage, performing a song.

In 1992, he developed his own style of arranging his songs. In 1996, he released the single Basta volersi bene ("Just love yourself"), with a video, which, according to his own, unconfirmed claim, was presented at the Cannes Film Festival in the section dedicated to music videos. In 1997, he won positive press reviews at the first Accademia della canzone music competition (the current Area competition ) but did not win the competition. In 2000, he, according to his own claim, participated in the Christmas concert in the Vatican hall Sala Nervi with the presence of Pope John Paul II, as well as the World Youth Day in Rome. Since that experience, his music has been strongly linked to Catholicism. Currently, he is the organizer of a Christian music festival in Sanremo.
