= List of festivals in Costa Rica =

Festivals of Costa Rica
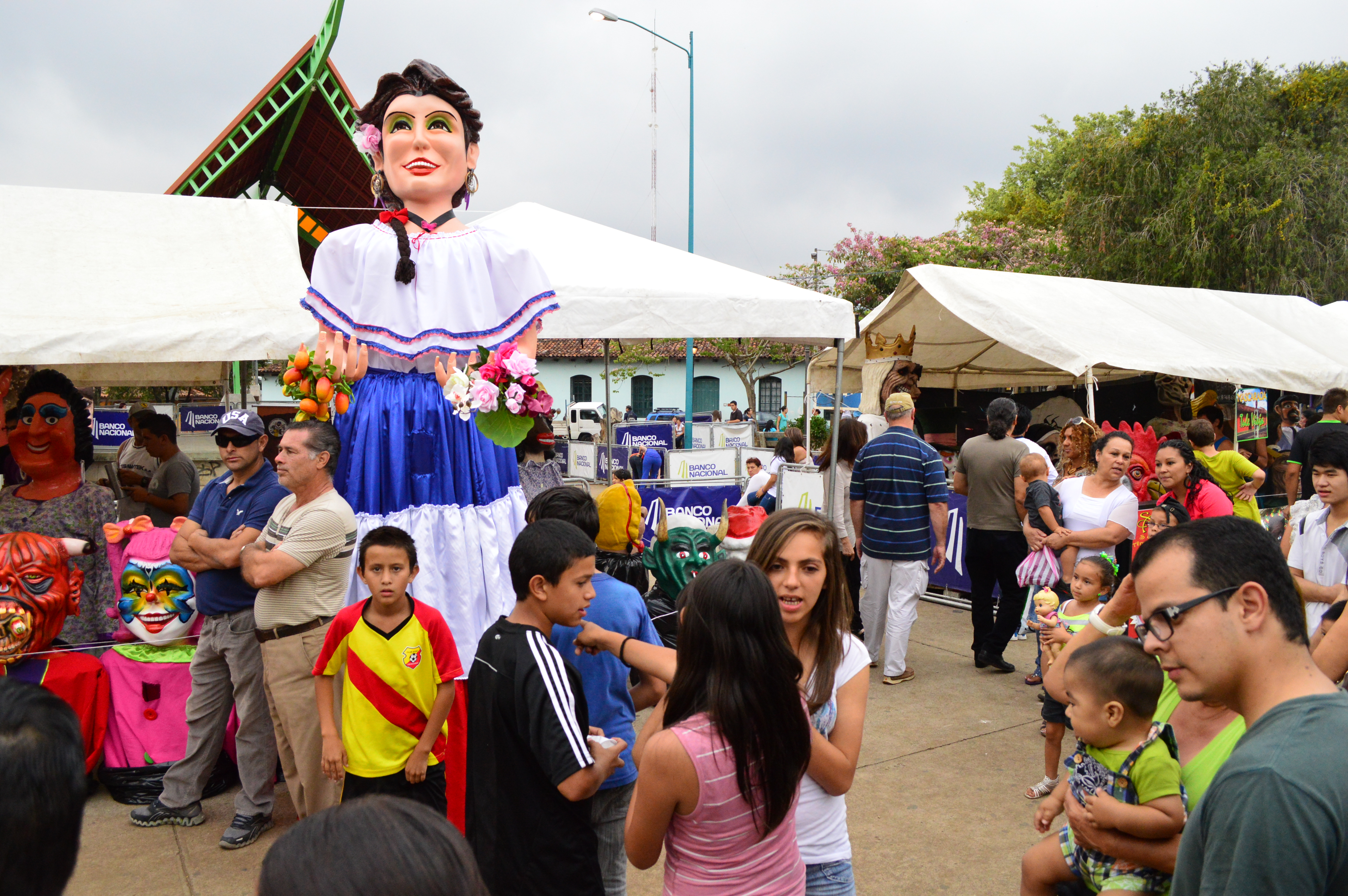

Related topics
- Festivals of North America; festivals of South America; Lists by country (United States; Cuba; Nicaragua; Panama; Puerto Rico); culture of Costa Rica; tourism in Costa Rica; public holidays in Costa Rica

This is a list of festivals celebrated in Costa Rica. This includes regional festivals, commerce festivals, fairs, food festivals, arts festivals, religious festivals, folk festivals, and recurring festivals on holidays.

== January ==
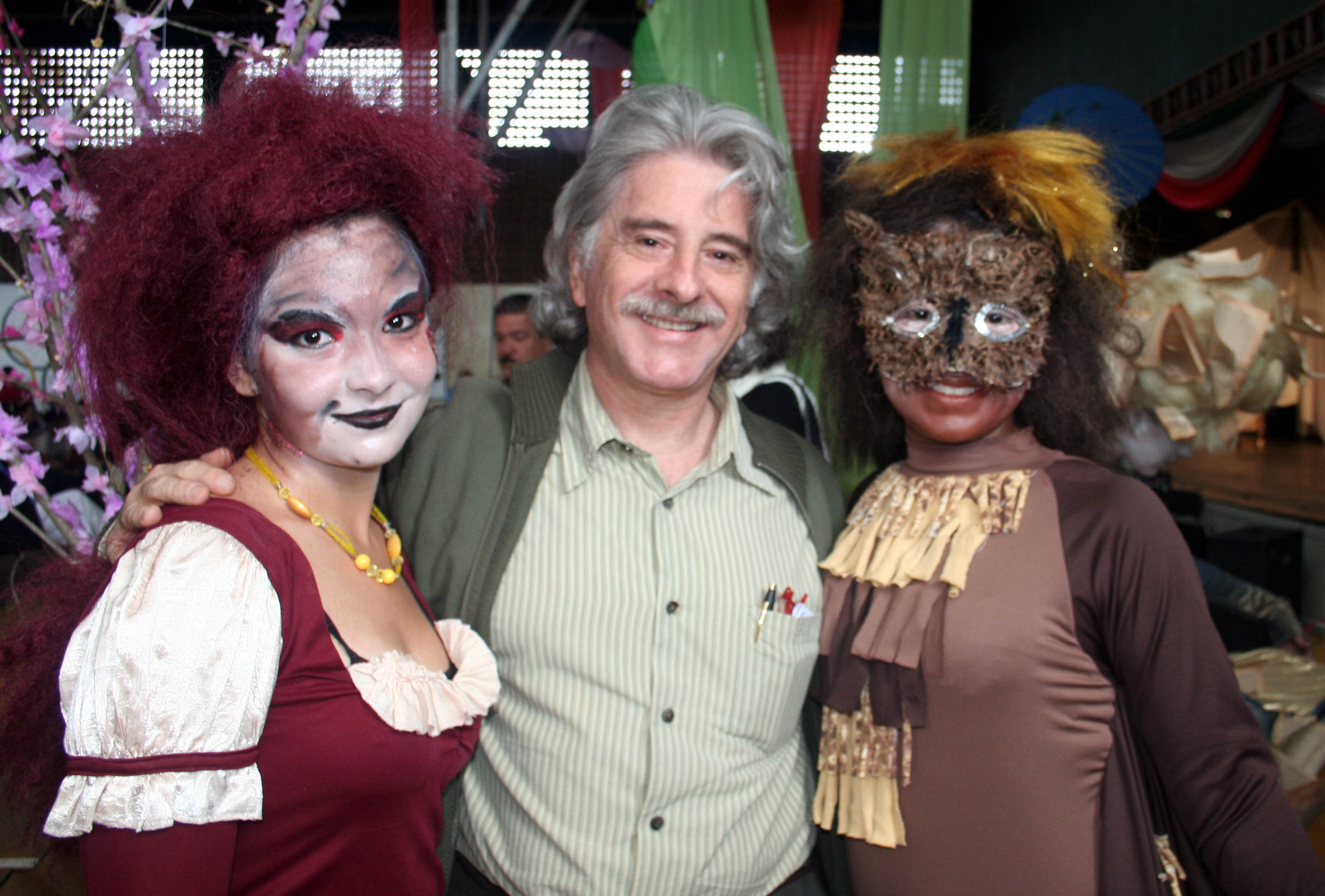
Festival de la Creatividad (2008)

=== Fiestas de Palmares ===
This is celebrated in the first two weeks of January in Palmares de Alajuela. Concerts with music, rodeos and firework displays are held. There is also a fairground and sporting competition.

=== Fiesta Patronal de Santo Cristo ===
This is a religious fiesta held in mid January in Santa Cruz. Rodeos, folk dancing and street festivities are held for two days to honor Santo Cristo de Esquipulas. A parade of ox-carts is also part of the tradition, as is a large feast.

=== Festival de las Kobe ===
This is held in late January at Playas Esterillos, near Jacó. Mule races are held on the beach, with bullfights, music and a crafts fair.

== February ==
=== Expo Pérez Zeledón ===
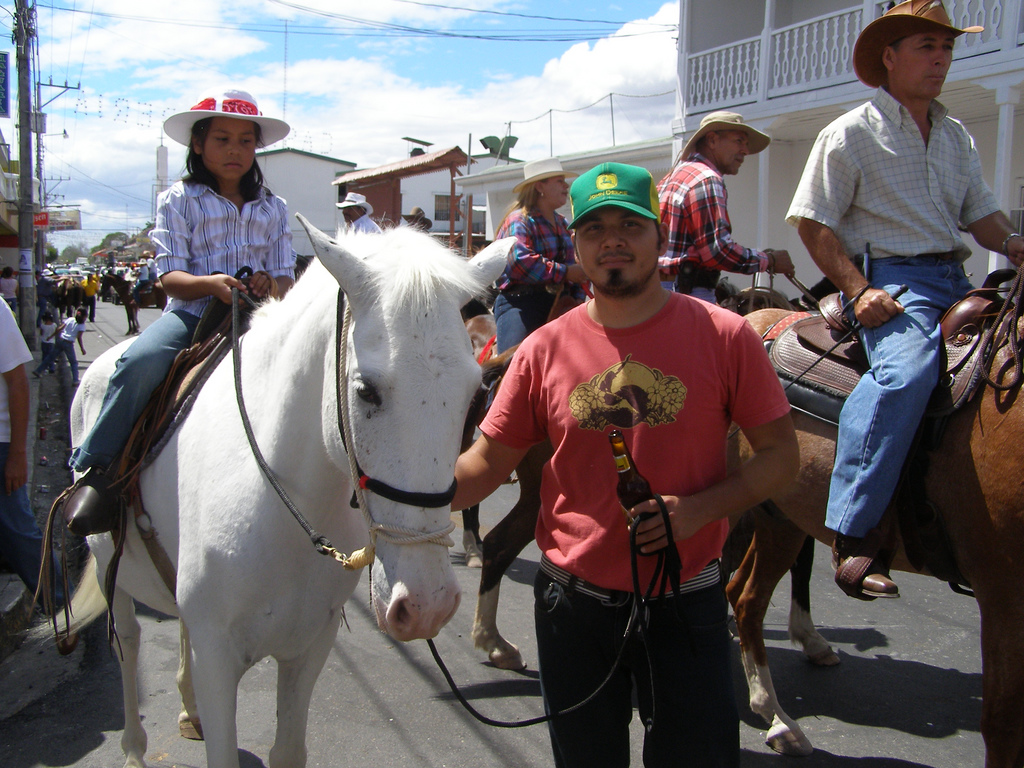
February celebrations in Liberia, Costa Rica

This is held in early February. Cattle and horse displays, rodeos, orchid and agricultural displays and beauty contests are held

== March ==
=== El Día del Boyero ===
This takes places the second Sunday of March. El Día del Boyero means Oxcart Driver's Day. This celebration's main festivity of the parade is the painted and decorated oxcarts. Also, the priest comes to bless all of the crops and animals that are in the parade. The carts are beautifully decorated by very skilled artist. The designs on these oxcarts are mostly patterns of stars, flowers, and the sun with a variation of colors. Over one hundred oxcarts are decorated for this festival many more ox's are pulling these carts. A boyero, or oxcart driver, guides the oxen and hopes that they will win the competition.

=== International Festival of the Arts ===
This is held on the second Sunday in San José when the theatres are jam packed with people watching live theatre, music and dance performances.

== April ==
=== Día de Juan Santamaría ===
This is held on April 11 in Alajuela with marching bands and a beauty pageant to celebrate Juan Santamaría, a national hero who died fighting William Walker in the 1856 war.

=== Semana Universitaria ===
Commonly named Semana U, the event is held in the last week of April in San José at the Ciudad Universitaria Rodrigo Facio, main campus of the University of Costa Rica with open air arts shows, sporting events, and concerts.

== May ==
=== Fiesta Cívica ===
This is held in early May in Cañas with cowboy traditions such as bullfights and horse displays (topes) and street fairs.

=== Corpus Christi ===
This is held on May 29 in Pacayas and Cartago with religious parades and church services.

== June ==
=== Compañía de Lírica Nacional ===
Festival Juvenil de Piano - Costa Rica Piano Festival

== December ==
=== Fiesta de los Negritos ===
This is a Boruca festival held on December 8. The indigenous Boruca peoples celebrate traditions with traditional dress, dancing, and music with flutes and drums.

=== Fiesta de la Yegüita ===
This is held on December 12 by the Nicoya. A Chorotega legend is recalled and villagers carry an image of La Virgen de Guadalupe in procession. The festival is a mixture of native Indian and Roman Catholicism.

=== Las Posadas ===
This is held on December 15 as part of the Christmas season when carolers visit houses and receive refreshments.

=== Tope Nacional de Caballos ===
This is held on Boxing Day, December 26, in San José, where the most talented horsemen in Costa Rica perform a display along the Paseo Colon with more than 3,000 horses.

=== Festival de la Luz ===
This is held on the second Saturday of December in San José with a Christmas tree parade at night and fireworks.

=== Carnaval Nacional ===
This is held on December 27 in San José when people wear costumes and dance in the streets in accompaniment to live music. A procession of decorated floats is also held.

=== Fiesta de Zapote ===
This is held in the suburb of Zapote in late December for the fairground, fireworks, and rodeo performances

=== Fiesta de los Diablitos ===
This is held from December 31 to January 2 over the New Year by the Boruca when the men dress as devils and run through Boruca villages to re-enact battles with the Spanish. It is simply a reenactment of the Spanish invasion.

== See also ==
- Culture of Costa Rica
- Tourism in Costa Rica
- Public holidays in Costa Rica
