= Mushroom festival =

Culinary event involving mushrooms

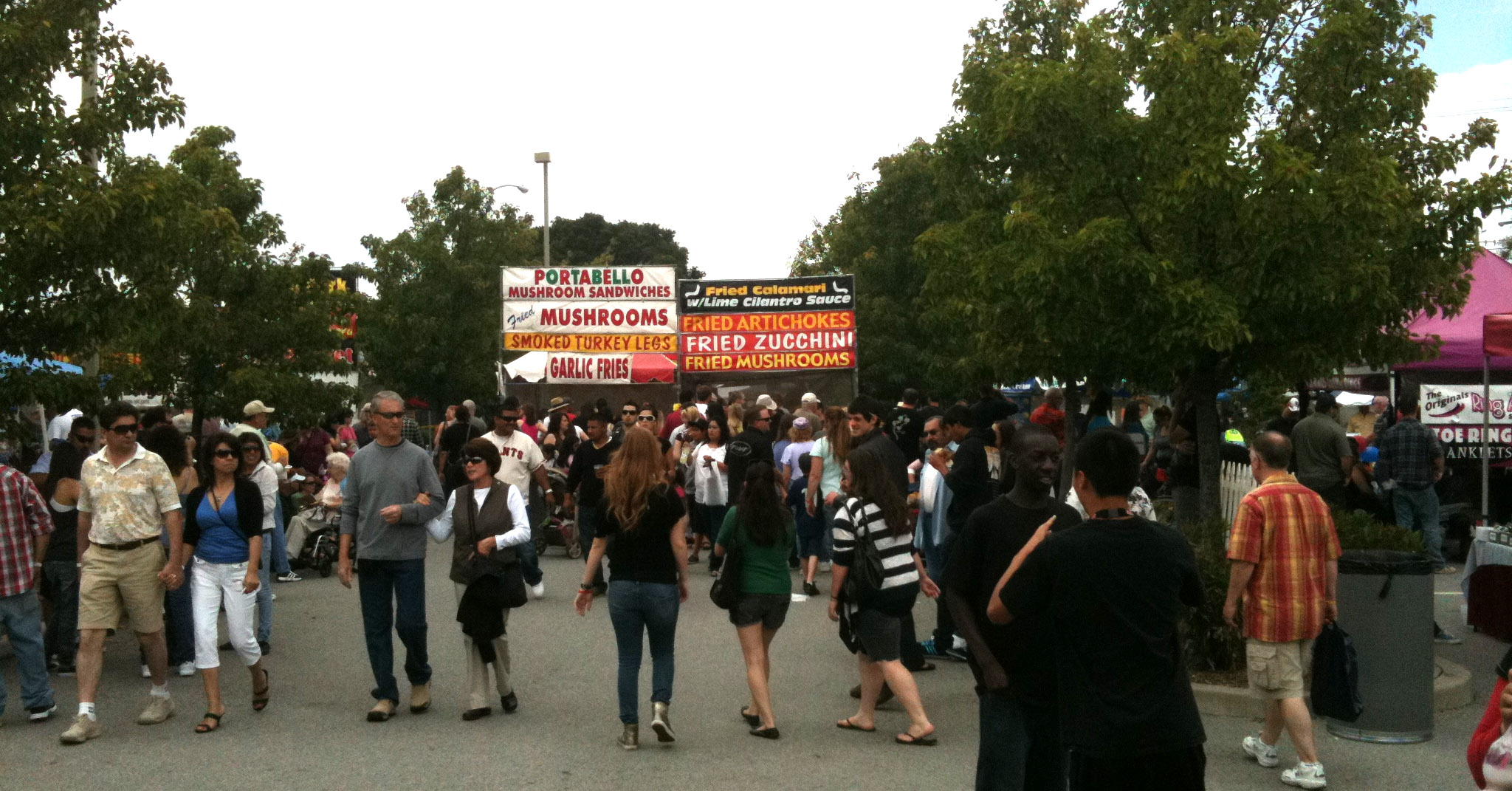
The Mushroom Mardi Gras Festival in Morgan Hill, California

A mushroom festival is a food festival that features mushrooms.

These involve guided foraging walks, training workshops, cooking demos, food stalls, eating competitions, mushroom-themed merchandise, film screening and more such events.

There are numerous mushroom festivals held annually across the globe:

- Kennett Square, Pennsylvania
- Telluride Mushroom Festival in Telluride, Colorado
- Mushroom Festival at Mount Pisgah Arboretum in Eugene, Oregon
- Morel Mushroom Festival held in Harrison, Michigan, Mesick, Michigan, and Boyne City, Michigan
- Fantastic Forage Mushroom Festival held in Laconia, New Hampshire
- Mushroom Mardi Gras Festival held in Morgan Hill, California
- Santa Cruz Mountain Mushroom Festival in Santa Cruz, California
- Pacific Northwest Mushroom Festival in Lacey, Washington
- Memphis Mushroom Festival in Memphis, Tennessee
- Mexico´s Magnificent Mushroom Festival, San Mateo Rio Hondo, Oaxaca
- Miscaros Mushroom Festival in Alcaide, Portugal
- Matsutake Mushroom Festival in Genekha, Bhutan
- Morabool Mushroom Festival in Victoria, Australia
- Kootenay Mushroom Festival in Kaslo, British Columbia, Canada
- Sicamous Mushroom Festival in Sicamous, British Columbia, Canada

== See also ==
- Mushroom hunting
- Oyster festival
- Taste Festival
- Gilroy Garlic Festival
