= Mexico City International Film Festival =

Mexico City International Film Festival, or FICC (Festival Internacional de Cine en la Ciudad de México) for its initials in Spanish, was an annual film festival that began in February 2011.

It quickly become one of the most important film festivals in Latin America. It was hosted by Cinemark, one of the three dominant movie theater chains in Mexico. It lasted two weeks and programmed sections on documentary features, fiction, worldwide premieres, retrospectives, and global tendencies in cinema. The jury was composed of important figures of the film industry worldwide.

In the 1st edition of 2011 it programmed documentary retrospectives on MUNAL, a Cuban film retrospective.

== See also ==
- Mexico International Short Film Festival
- Film festivals in North and Central America
