= Cine Pobre Film Festival =

Self-funded filmmaking genre with no boundaries

Cine Pobre (lit., in Spanish, poor cinema) is a self-funded filmmaking genre without a set of stylistic criteria nor format boundaries, involving many geographically separated creators with at least two things in common: a strong desire to tell their story and to do so with their own resources. The term cine pobre was coined by Humberto Solás.

== Multiple International Events ==
There are numerous Cine Pobre inspired venues in several countries around the world, notably in Mexico, Spain, Panama, and Cuba. As the former manifest of the renamed Cuban Event stated, 'Low-Budget Cinema' does not mean cinema devoid of ideas or artistic quality. It refers to a type of cinema of restricted economic possibilities, done in less developed countries or in those around them.

While Panama's Cine Pobre Panalandia is an institutionally sponsored event by Fundación Centro de Imagen y Sonido, Cuba's event has dropped Cine Pobre from its name and relies on the key support of the Cuban Institute for Movie Art and Industry (ICAIC), the Ministry of Culture of Cuba, the Provincial Government of Holguín Province and the City of Gibara. Mexico's Cine Pobre Film Festival is the only independent, film-maker managed and self-funded venue.
