= Tourism in North America =

Tourism in North America may refer to:

- Economy of Antigua and Barbuda#Tourism
- Economy of Aruba#Tourism
- Tourism in the Bahamas
- Economy of Barbados#Tourism
- Tourism in Belize
- Economy of Bermuda#Tourism
- Bonaire#Tourism
- Economy of the British Virgin Islands#Tourism
- Tourism in Canada
- Cayman Islands#Tourism
- Tourism in Costa Rica
- Tourism in Cuba
- Economy of Curaçao#Tourism
- Tourism in Dominica
- Tourism in the Dominican Republic
- Tourism in El Salvador
- Tourism in Greenland
- Grenada#Tourism
- Guadeloupe#Tourism
- Tourism in Guatemala
- Tourism in Haiti
- Tourism in Honduras
- Economy of Jamaica#Tourism
- Martinique#Tourism
- Tourism in Mexico
- Tourism in Nicaragua
- Tourism in Panama
- Tourism in Puerto Rico
- Saba (island)#Tourism
- Saint_Barthélemy#Tourism
- Economy of Saint Kitts and Nevis#Tourism
- Tourism in Saint Lucia
- Economy of Saint Martin (island)#Tourism
- Saint Vincent and the Grenadines#Tourism
- Economy of Trinidad and Tobago#Tourism
- Tourism in the Turks and Caicos Islands
- Tourism in the United States
- Economy of the United States Virgin Islands#Tourism
