= Sanremo Christian Song Festival =

Italian music festival

Sanremo Christian Song Festival "Festival della Canzone Cristiana Sanremo"
- The logo of the festival
- Genre: Christian music
- Frequency: Annually
- Locations: Sanremo, Liguria
- Country: Italy
- Inaugurated: 3 February 2022
- Founder: Fabrizio Venturi
- Most recent: 13 February 2025
- Website: https://www.sanremofestivaldellacanzonecristiana.it/

The Sanremo Christian Song Festival (Italian: Festival della Canzone Cristiana Sanremo) is an Italian music festival and song contest held annually in the city of Sanremo, Liguria.

The festival was created as to give a spotlight to christian music in Italy and to spread the word of Jesus Christ and Christianity through the use of music and songs.

== Patronages ==
It has the patronage of the Italian Chamber of Deputies, the Italian Senate of the Republic, the Liguria region, the province of Imperia and the diocese of Sanremo and Ventimiglia. The official media of the festival are Vatican Radio, Vatican News, joined by Radio Speranza in 2025.

Following 2026, the festival announced a partnership with "Media Partner" and Bella, Così, Ciao Donna, In Famiglia and Di Tutto Italian magazines.

== History ==
The creator of the festival, Fabrizio Venturi, first thought of creating the festival in 2019. However, due to the COVID-19 pandemic, the project was delayed and only brought to fruition in 2021, doing its first edition on 3 February 2022. In its first edition, the "Diolovuole Band" were welcomed as special guests.

Throughout the years it was proposed by various individuals as a way as to select an hypothetical Vatican candidate for the Eurovision Song Contest.

The 2024 edition saw christian musician Noel Robinson as a special guest.

The festival gained increasing traction after its 2025 edition thanks to the help of Christian online groups, specifically ones on the social media platform Facebook. The 2025 edition was dedicated to Pope Francis and the 2025 Jubilee. It was also announced that in this edition the winner would receive an authentic trophy made by Michele Affidato, the same goldsmith who makes the trophies for the Sanremo Music Festival, this would continue in the other editions after it.

The 2026 edition brought in numerous changes. Massimo Galfano, who previously had experiences as a talent scout for Area Sanremo, Sanremo Giovani, The Voice Senior, stated he had found new talents as candidates for the next edition. This specific edition was dedicated to those "who operate peace". Marco Celauro from Agrigento won the 2026 edition.

== Editions ==
This is a list of all the editions of the festival, as well as the respective victorious author and song of each edition.

Editions of the Sanremo Christian Song Festival
Year	Song	Artist(s)	References
2022	"Vale la pena"	Fra Vinicius	
2023	"Ti verrò a cercare"	Francesca Samarati	
2024	"Un lampo nei suoi occhi"	Giuseppe Marchese	
2025	"Una strada in mezzo al cielo"	Piero Chiappano	
2026	"Il tuo amore"	Marco Celauro	
