= Belize International Film Festival =

- Location: Belize City, Belize
- Founded: July 2003
- Hosted by: Film and Media Arts Unit- NICH
- Language: English
- Website: https://www.belizefilmfestival.com/

The Belize International Film Festival is an international film festival held annually in Belize City, Belize since 2003 (In 2015, it was hosted on the tropical peninsula, Placencia). It focuses on Central American and Caribbean films, as well as international films from around the world. A recurring theme in the Festival is the highlighting of relevant contemporary issues, such as poverty, abuse, and poaching. A distinct award category called "Best Environmental Film" was created to further acknowledge and solidify its commitment to environmental awareness. There are different categories of film presented at the festival: feature narratives, short films, feature documentaries, short documentaries, and a special music video category. An international jury is invited to every Festival to judge the films presented.

In 2005 a presentation was given on Nicaraguan cinema. In 2012, for the first time in its history, a Belizean feature film in the Belizean Creole language (2012: Kurse a di Xtabai) was presented as the opening night movie.

== See also ==
- List of film festivals in North and Central America
- List of film festivals in South America
