= List of Sauerkraut Days celebrations =

The following is a list of towns or cities holding celebrations known as "Sauerkraut Days":

- Ackley, Iowa has held an annual Sauerkraut Days celebration since 1902.
- Blairstown, Iowa holds an annual Sauerkraut Days celebration.
- Henderson, Minnesota holds an annual Sauerkraut Days celebration at the end of June.
- Lisbon, Iowa holds an annual Sauerkraut Days festival.
- Wishek, North Dakota holds an annual Sauerkraut Day.
- Providence, Utah has an annual Sauerkraut Days festival in the Swiss tradition.
- Frankfort, Illinois holds a "Frankfort Fall Festival" which was originally known as Sauerkraut Days.
- Forreston, Illinois holds an annual "Sauerkraut Day".
