= Mushroom Mardi Gras Festival =

Festival in Morgan Hill, California

- Logo as of 2024

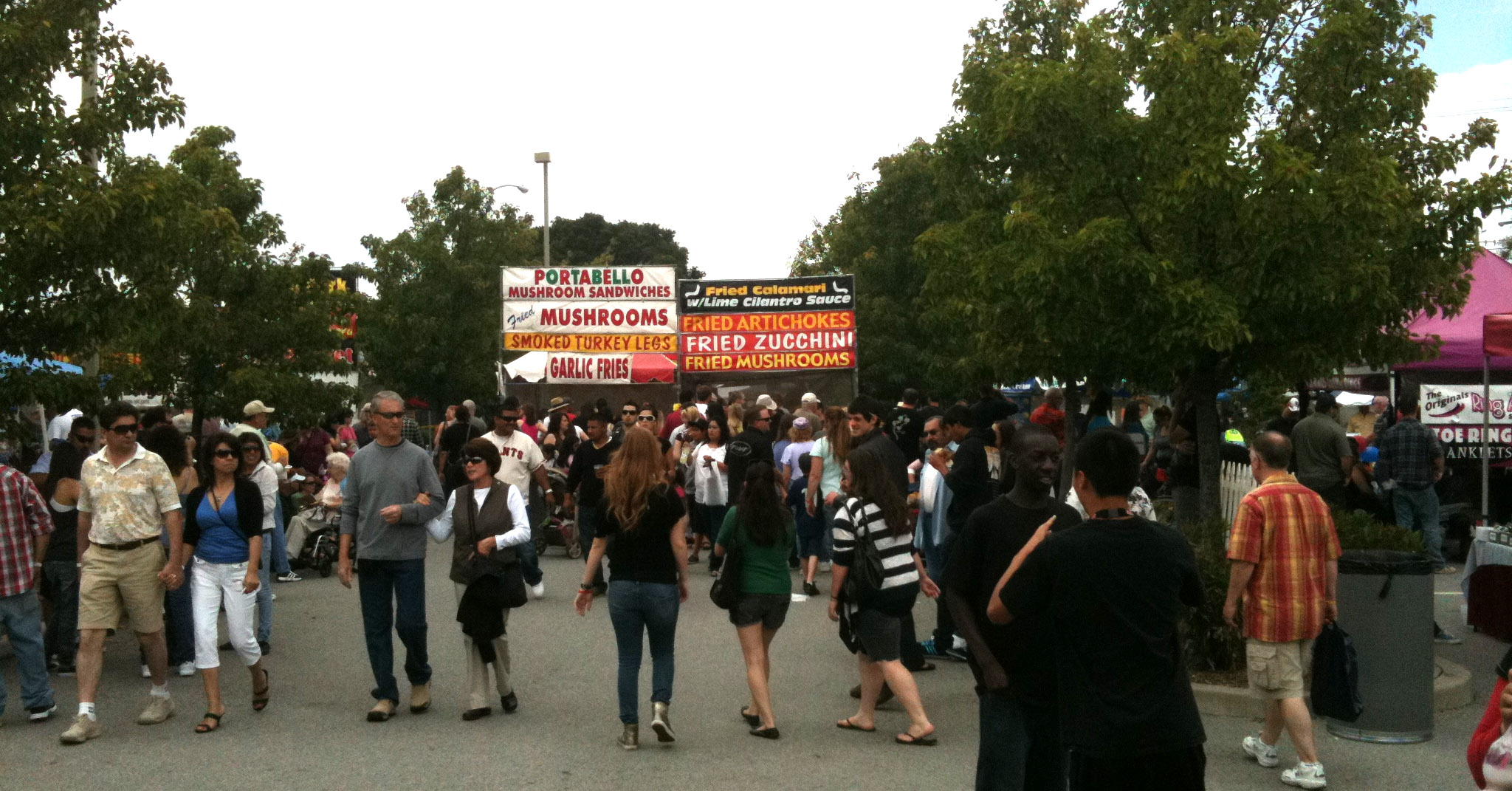
- People attending the festival in 2011
- Status: Active
- Genre: Mushroom festival
- Begins: Memorial Day weekend
- Ends: One day after
- Frequency: Annually
- Venue: Community and Cultural Center
- Location: Downtown Morgan Hill (Note: Since 2005, it has been held at Morgan Hill's downtown area.)
- Coordinates: 37°7′35″N 121°38′59″W
- Country: United States
- Years active: 46
- Inaugurated: October 18, 1980
- Founder: Bradley Ross Spencer
- Most recent: May 24, 2026
- Major events: Mushroom dishes
- Organizer: Morgan Hill Mushroom Mardi Gras, Inc.
- Filing status: 501(c)(3)
- Sponsors: Local mushroom farms
- Website: morganhillmushroomfestival.org

The Mushroom Mardi Gras Festival (rebranded as Morgan Hill Mushroom Festival for 2024) is an annual festival held in the downtown area of Morgan Hill, California. It is hosted by the nonprofit organization Morgan Hill Mushroom Mardi Gras, Inc. The festival was established in 1980 by Brad Spencer, and several sponsors supply mushrooms to create mushroom-themed dishes.

== History ==
Founder and fire chief Bradley Ross Spencer (July 6, 1942 – July 2, 2015) first conceptualized the festival when he wanted to raise money for his local fire department, the Morgan Hill Fire Department, after it was affected by Proposition 13. On October 18, 1980, the first festival was held, attracting 30,000 visitors.

In 2014, 80,000 people attended the Mushroom Mardi Gras Festival, setting a new record. Due to the COVID-19 pandemic, the festival was cancelled in 2020 and 2021. In 2023, it was postponed after numerous safety concerns were raised regarding the Gilroy Garlic Festival shooting. The festival raises scholarship money for high schoolers within the Morgan Hill Unified School District.

=== 2024 rebranding ===
In 2024, the event was rebranded as the Morgan Hill Mushroom Festival. Unlike previous festivals, a twenty dollar admission was implemented to pay for costs and scholarship funds.

== Activities ==
Customers may visit booths preparing dishes made from mushrooms. Other activities include arts-and-crafts, museums, live music, and scholarship award ceremonies. Wine tasting was added in 2016. A Mushroom Expo in the rose garden of the Community and Cultural Center showcases the use of mushrooms.

The festival is usually hosted in May.
