= St. Barth Film Festival =

Caribbean film festival

The St. Barth Film Festival, also known as the St. Barts Festival of Caribbean Cinema, is a film festival held annually at the end of April in Saint Barthélemy in the Caribbean. It was established in 1996, and hosts Caribbean films for five days.

Elite Traveller wrote of the festival: "Now an established event on the island’s cultural calendar, the festival has put St. Barths on the map as a meeting place for regional filmmakers to come together to screen and discuss their work. In addition to the 35mm films screened every evening on the beach, the festival also presents an annual round-table discussion on Caribbean cinema, offering a glimpse into the unique arts and culture scene of the Caribbean basin."
