= List of dogwood festivals =

Several U.S. cities and towns hold dogwood festivals. These are usually annual events coinciding with the blooming of dogwood trees in the spring:

- The Atlanta Dogwood Festival is an arts-and-crafts fair held annually at Piedmont Park in Atlanta, Georgia.
- The Galena Dogwood Festival is an annual festival held in Galena, Maryland. Since 1984, it has grown into Galena's most well known event. This event is free to the community, starting with a parade through Main Street and ending at the local Elementary School. The event continues into the community park, where there are a plethora of vendors, entertainment, food & beer, and much more. The event is held annually the second Saturday each May at the community park. https://townofgalena.com/dogwood
- The Vestavia Hills Dogwood Festival is a multifaceted month-long event in Vestavia Hills, Alabama
- The Dogwood Festival of Charlottesville, Virginia has been held since 1958.
- The Fayetteville Dogwood Festival in Fayetteville, North Carolina is a three-day event held annually since 1982
- Siloam Springs, Arkansas holds an annual Dogwood Festival in April
- Winchester, Tennessee, has held a Dogwood Festival annually since 2005.
- The Dogwood Arts Festival is a yearly arts festival in Knoxville, Tennessee, that was started in 1960.
- The Dogwood Festival held in Quincy, Illinois annually in May.
- The "Dogwood Festival of the Lewis-Clark Valley" is a month-long festival celebrated annually in Lewiston, Idaho
- The "Lake of the Ozarks Dogwood Festival" began in 1950 in Camdenton, Missouri.
- The Dogwood-Azalia Festival in Charleston, Missouri has been held every April since 1968.
- A Dogwood Festival has been held annually since 1962 in Perry County, Indiana
- An annual Dogwood Festival in Farmville, North Carolina was started in 1987
- The annual Dogwood Festival in Woodville, Texas was started in 1940.
- A Dogwood Festival is held annually in Vinton, Virginia.
- A Dogwood Festival takes place in May at Phoenixville, Pennsylvania.
- A Dogwood Festival is held annually in April Mebane, North Carolina.
- A Dogwood Festival is held annually in May in Mullens, West Virginia.
- A Dogwood Festival, dating back to 1936, is held annually in early May in Fairfield, CT.
- Dogwood Day is celebrated every May 21 in Milwaukie, Oregon, "The Dogwood City of the West."
