= Guelaguetza =

Annual indigenous cultural event in Oaxaca, Mexico

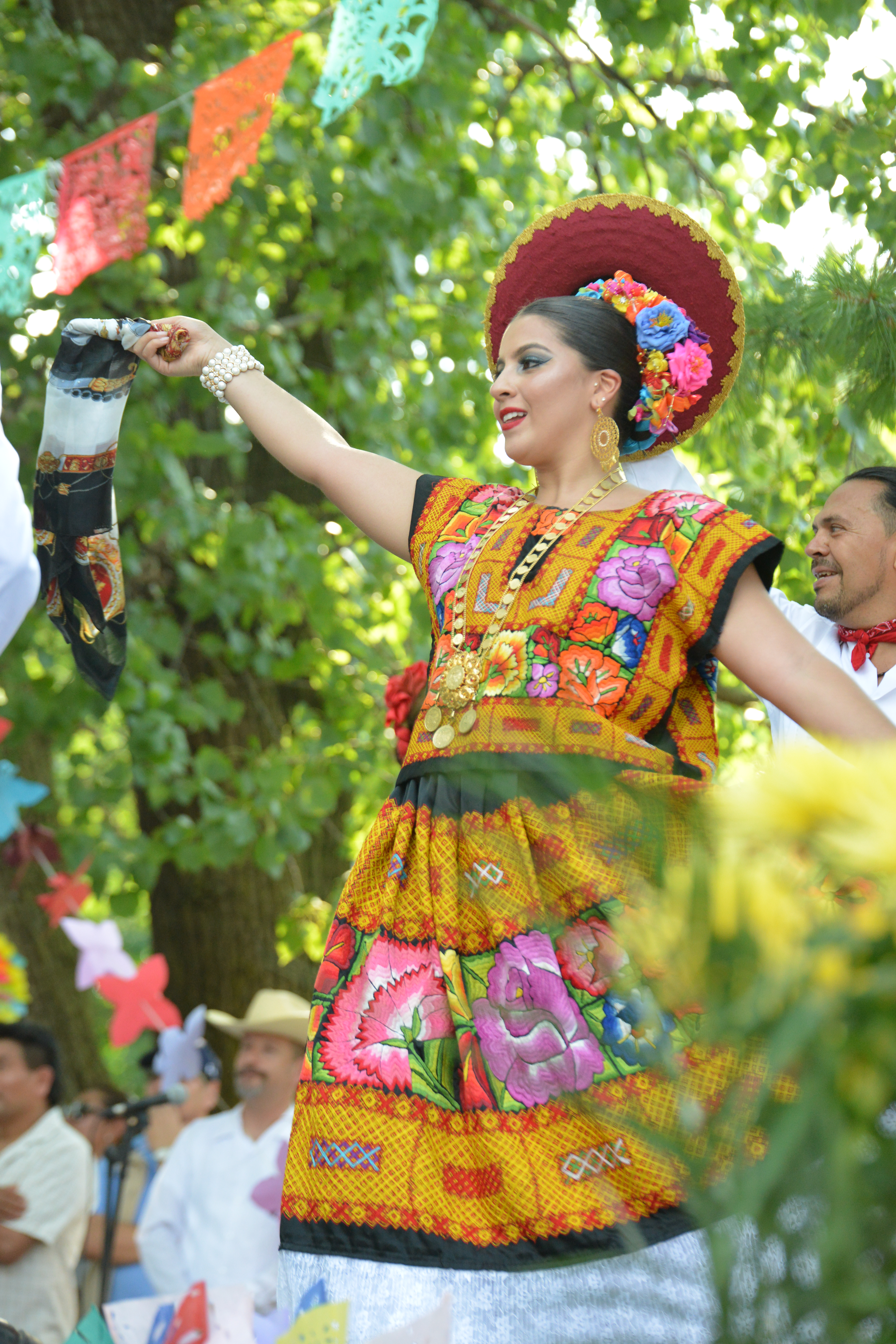
Woman dancing folk dance at the 2019 Guelaguetza Festival.

The Guelaguetza (/ˌɡɛləˈɡɛtsə/; Spanish: [ɡelaˈɣetsa]), also known as Los lunes del cerro ('Mondays on the Hill'), is an annual indigenous cultural event in Mexico that takes place in the city of Oaxaca, capital of the state of Oaxaca, and nearby villages. The celebration features traditional costumed dancing by gender-separated groups. It includes native food, and statewide artisanal crafts, such as pre-Hispanic style textiles. Each costume, or traje, and dance usually has a local indigenous historical and cultural meaning. While the celebration has attracted an increasing number of tourists, it is primarily one of deep cultural importance for the indigenous peoples of the state and is important for the survival of these cultures.

== Background ==
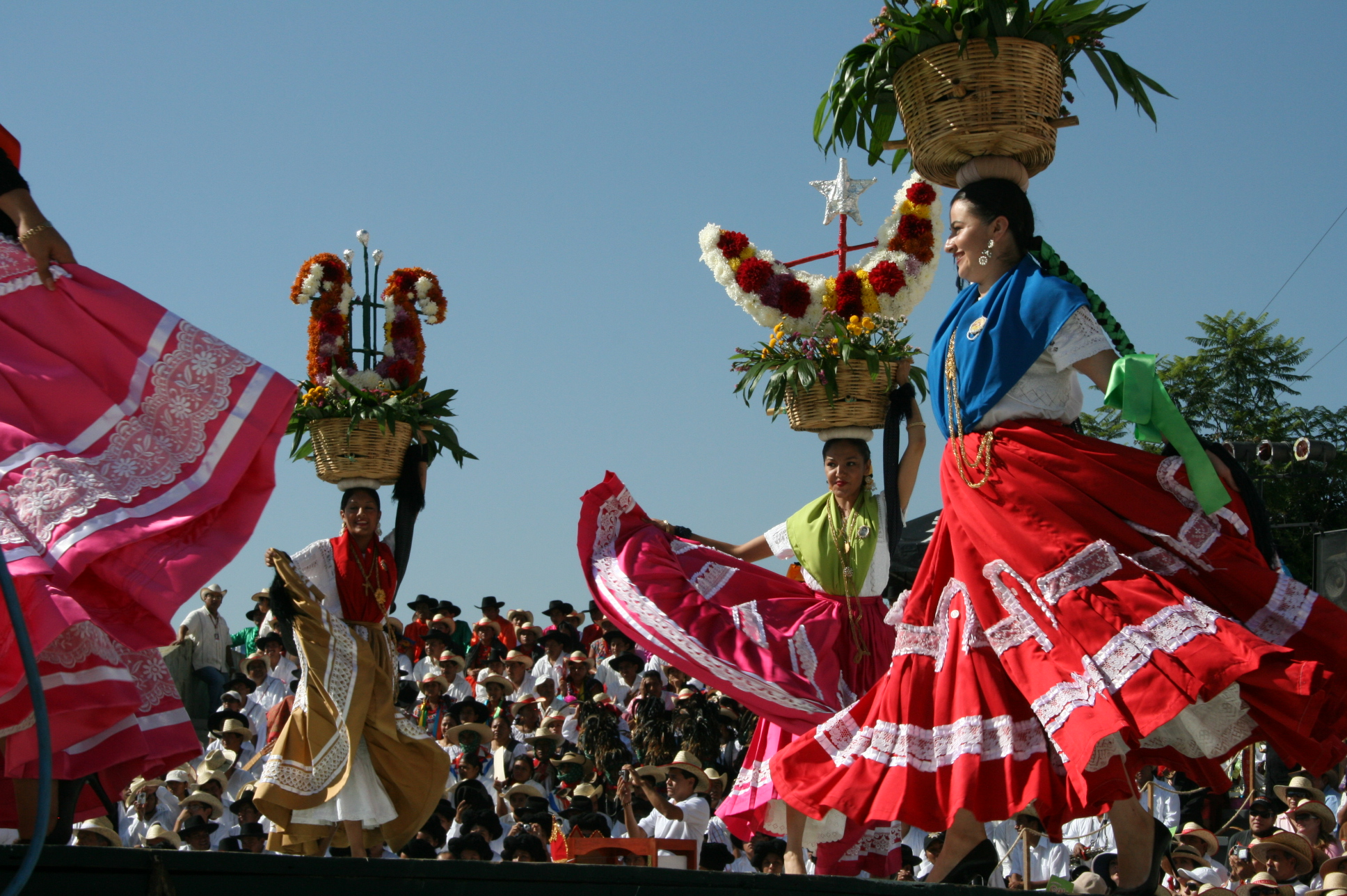
Chinas Oaxaqueñas at the Guelaguetza 2008.

Oaxaca has a large native indigenous population, well over 30% of the state, compared to 10% for Mexico as a whole (going by 2020 INEGI ethnic report). Indigenous culture in Oaxaca remains strong. More than 300,000 people are monolingual in one of a wide variety of native indigenous languages, and many others are bilingual, with Spanish as their second language, or follow a predominantly indigenous lifestyle. Unlike Yucatán, where the indigenous culture consists of closely related groups of the same culture (Mayan), the indigenous people in Oaxaca are from many different cultures.

The Zapotec and Mixtec are the two largest ethnic groups in terms of population and area, but there are numerous other indigenous ethnicities, each with their own unique traditions. They speak distinct, mutually unintelligible languages. The Guelaguetza celebration was a tradition that long preceded the arrival of the Spanish; it is a defining characteristic of Oaxacan regional culture.

Its origins and traditions developed as earth-based, religious celebrations related to the worship of corn (maize) and the corn god. The word Guelaguetza comes from the Zapotec language and is usually interpreted as the "reciprocal exchanges of gifts and services." This is in keeping with the importance in indigenous cultures of sharing, reciprocity, and extended community. Like many indigenous traditions in Mexico, the festival adapted to and absorbed Christian traditions in the centuries of cultural interchange after Spanish colonization.

== History ==
The Guelaguetza is also known as a celebration honoring Our Lady of Mount Carmel (Virgen del Carmen), which emphasizes Marianism, combined with the surviving beliefs. In the early part of the 20th century, a severe earthquake in the 1920s destroyed most of the city. Afterward, leaders reorganized the festival as a statewide cultural event to help rebuild the morale of the peoples of Oaxaca, naming it "La Guelaguetza de la Raza". The event began to take on a more modern form, as an opportunity for each people or region to showcase their unique dance. It also began to become more of a performance than a ritual festival.

In the 1970s, the city built a stadium dedicated to the Guelaguetza on a prominent place on Fortin Hill. National and international tourism have increased since the ancient city of Oaxaca and Monte Albán was designated in 1987 as a UNESCO world heritage city.

In November 1994, a modern, limited access highway was completed to the city. Before the highway, transportation was so slow that it was virtually impossible to journey there for a weekend at the Guelaguetza from other areas, such as Mexico City. The rugged, often remote, mountainous high-altitude terrain discouraged casual visitors.

In 2010 the city completed a new structure for the festival, also built as an open-air amphitheater built into the Cerro del Fortín, overlooking center city. It includes more seating, as well as areas for bands and performance stages, and can support modern lighting and sound.

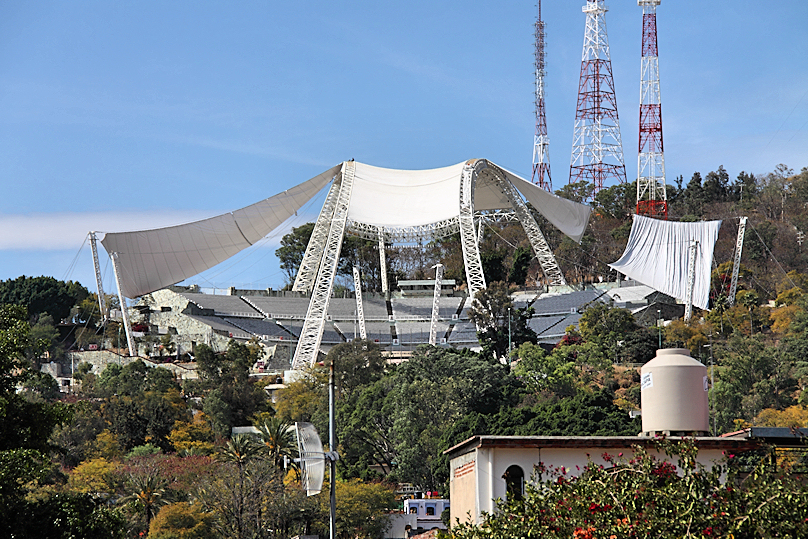
The new Guelaguetza auditorium, completed in 2010.

In contemporary Oaxaca, indigenous communities from the state gather at the Guelaguetza to present their native cultures, mainly in the form of music, costumes, dances, and food. It is the most famous indigenous gathering of its kind in Mexico. The Guelaguetza celebration includes many related side events, including a performance of "Princess Donají", an epic based on indigenous tradition, which is performed the day before the Guelaguetza begins.

== Dates when Celebrated ==
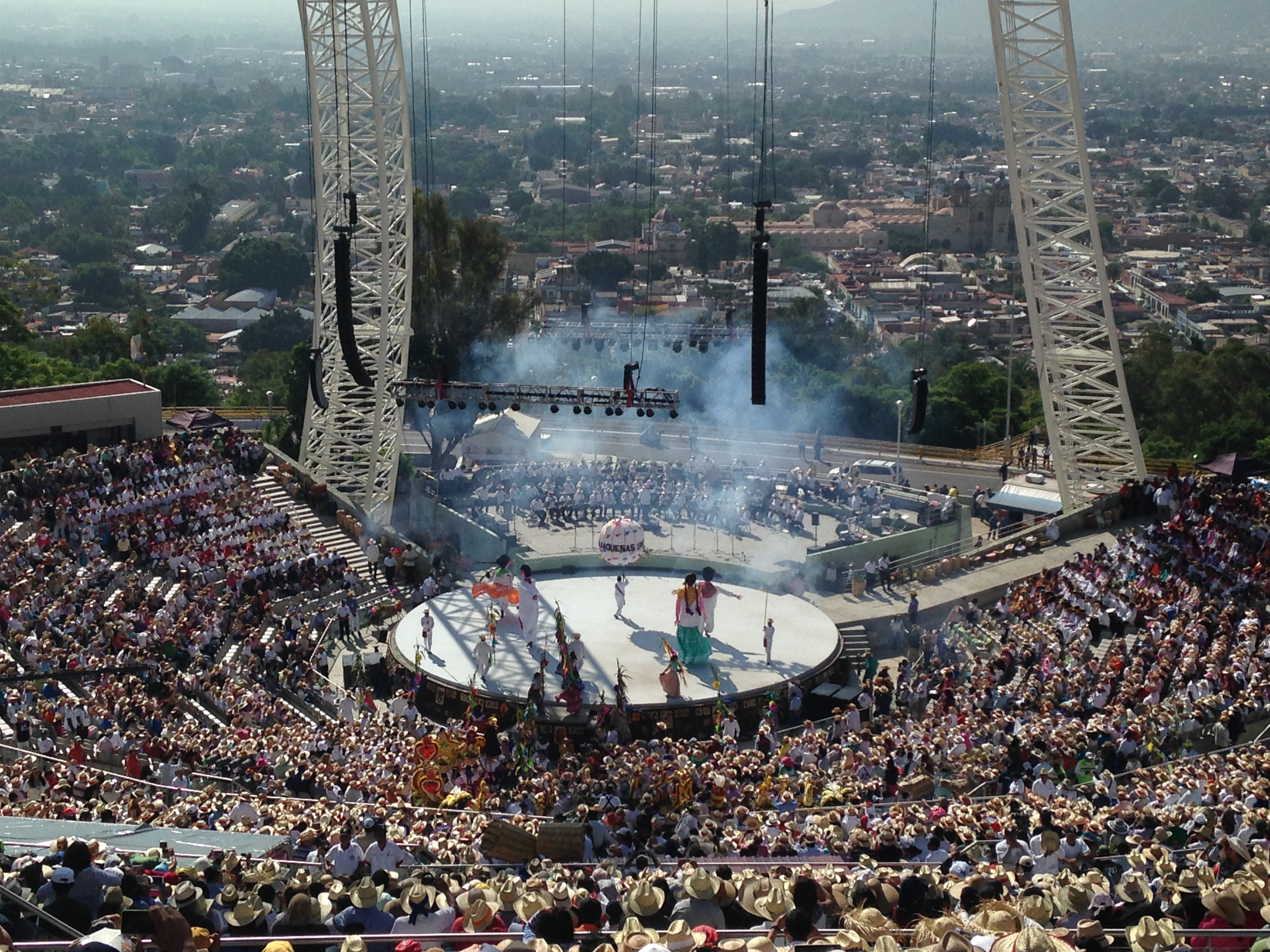
Guelaguetza Celebrations 27 July 2015.

Since 1969, the Guelaguetza has been celebrated on the two Mondays immediately following July 16, except when the first Monday falls on July 18, the day on which Benito Juárez died in 1872. A Zapotec, he became a lawyer and politician, and was the first indigenous president of Mexico, serving from 1858 to 1872. In those years, the celebrations are postponed for one week, falling on July 25 and August 1 (as occurred in 2011). Concurrent events associated with the festival, such as concerts and plays, are all held during the month of July.

In 2020 the festival was canceled because of the COVID-19 pandemic in Mexico, except for virtual events.

== Controversy ==
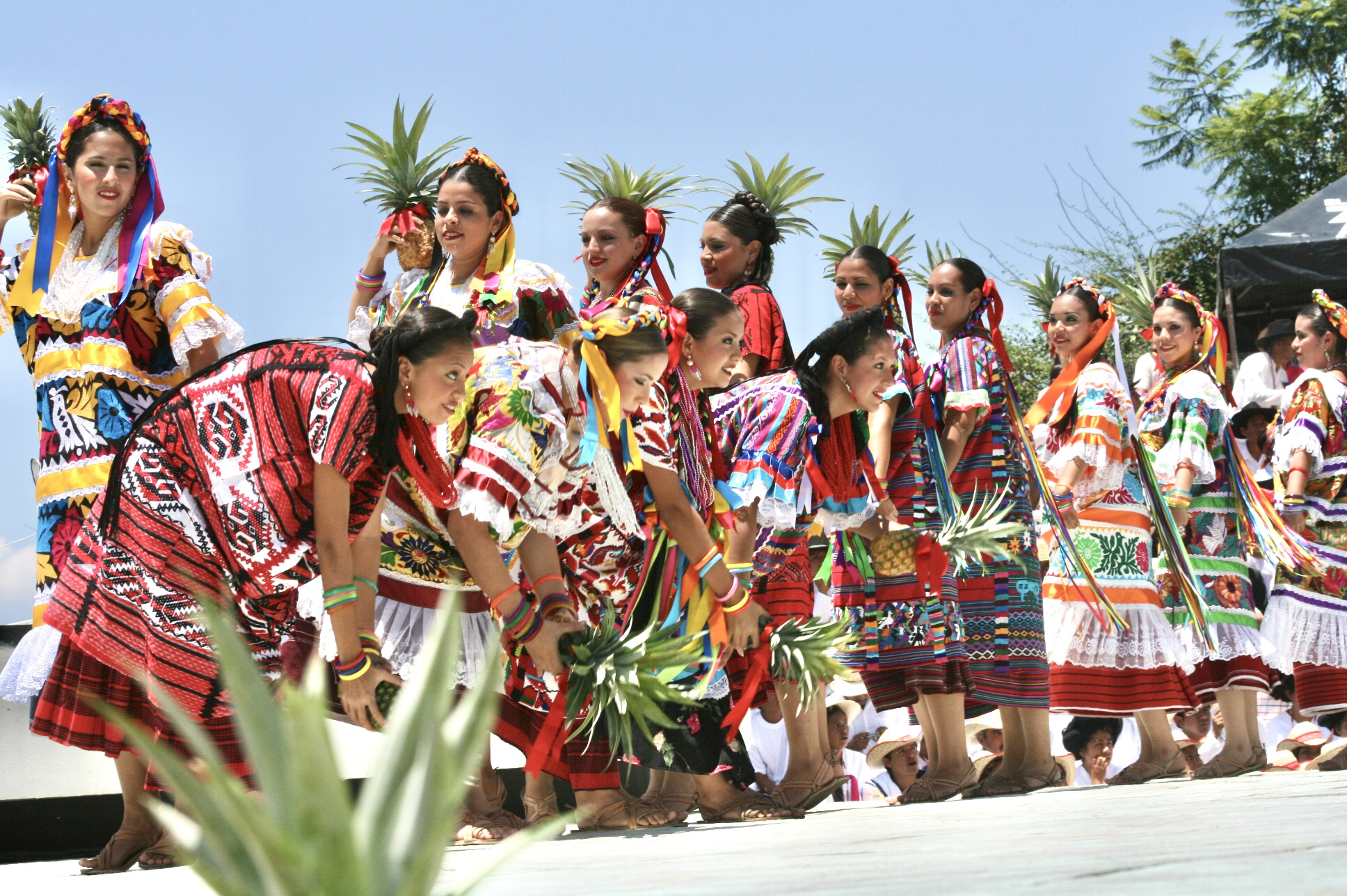
Women dancing the folk dance, "Flor de piña", in the Guelaguetza of 2008, one of the most characteristic dances associated with the Guelaguetza.

As the festival became a bigger tourist attraction, some indigenous leaders objected to the ancient traditions being used for commercial purposes. Some people in Oaxaca have supported a Populist Guelaguetza, or a return to the celebrations as they believe they were practiced, for the peoples themselves, before European colonialism and the current system.

In 2005 the regional government planned to conduct two performances a day of dance groups for each of the two Mondays. Many traditionalists believed this was disrespectful to indigenous culture, and an attempt to appropriate it by powerful economic forces and political interests, in order to accommodate more monied, ticket-purchasing, national and international tourists. Grassroots opposition formed, and the Popular Assembly of the Peoples of Oaxaca (APPO) (in Spanish, the Asamblea Popular del Pueblo de Oaxaca) organized out of groups that were protesting.

The Partido Revolucionario Institutional (PRI) - led state government and its leader tried to suppress the protests with armed confrontation, which resulted in deaths of three reporters.

In 2006, the government-sponsored Guelaguetza was not held at the Fortín hill as planned. Instead, the APPO organized a free, shared, "Popular Guelaguetza", trying to return it to the people.

The following year, the 2007 official Guelguetza celebration was boycotted by the APPO. But their attempts to hold a Popular Guelaguetza were thwarted by government police repression and state-sponsored military violence throughout the city. Due to some changes made in the makeup of the state government and the PRI's longstanding one-party monopoly on power in the state, subsequent Guelaguetza festivals have had a lesser degree of civil unrest, although numerous controversial issues still remain.

== In the U.S. ==
Oaxacan immigrants to the US have celebrated Guelaguetza there. In the U.S. the immigrants typically hold the Guelaguetza celebrations on Sundays, in keeping with standard work schedules, and usually in the summer months, ranging from late June to early August. Usually they have only one day of celebrations, but may have a party the day before, similar to the calenda, a parade in Oaxaca.

The Guelaguetzas in the U.S. consist of traditional dances performed by ethnic groups. Organizers usually provide for stands where companies or individuals can sell typical goods and food of Oaxaca, sometimes imported from Oaxaca for authenticity. Musical bands are brought from Oaxaca to accompany the dancers. Many of the Guelaguetzas are sponsored in part by TV stations, including Telemundo, local newspapers, community organizations, and companies. The celebrations have often received coverage from major newspapers, such as the LA Times.

One of the earliest Guelaguetzas in the US was held in Los Angeles, California, where there has been a large influx of Oaxacan immigration. The Organización Regional de Oaxaca (ORO) sponsored it and helped organize it. As with the Populist Guelaguetza, entry to the Guelaguetza is free. In 2012, the site of the Guelaguetza was moved from an area dominated by Zapotec people to one on the Eastside, in order to reach a wider audience. This Guelaguetza is also supported by different companies as well. It has the support of the restaurant Guelaguetza. Many different smaller companies that attend to get public recognition.

In Santa Cruz, California, the county government recognized the Guelaguetza as an official tradition. The organization Senderos: Creating Pathways helped establish it. The Guelaguetza in Santa Cruz takes place on the third Sunday each May, earlier than most others, and has been a festival for around 14 years so far. The Guelaguetza uses a regional group of dancers who have also been appearing at smaller community events. Their musical performances had been performed by a band from San Jose, and then, for a time before the community decided to hire a native band straight from Oaxaca. However, they are beginning to train musicians from Santa Cruz in order to increase community involvement.

Additionally, the Guelaguetza is held in San Jose, California. Lazos Oaxaqueños leads the festival, which includes more modern aspects such as mezcal tasting. An entrance fee is charged to raise money for the festival and community. This particular Guelaguetza received the support from Senderos when it first began. The groups Lazos Oaxaquenos and Senderos often rely on each others to produce the different Guelaguetzas. The San Jose festival first used a local band, but they have also hired a native band to come from Oaxaca to perform with dancers.

A majority of Guelaguetzas have been held on the West Coast because of its centers of population of immigrants from Oaxaca. There have also been such festivals on the East Coast. The consulate of Mexico in New York advertises Guelaguetzas that are held in New Brunswick, Brooklyn, and Poughkeepsie.

=== Social implications in the U.S. ===
Other Hispanic organizations have worked to provide support for their communities in the US. Many have sought to help people from Oaxaca retain their culture after immigrating to the U.S. They also provide activities and support to the children of these communities. The group ORO does not limit their support to indigenous Oaxacans; it provides a "scholarship fund that has been awarded to various students to pursue a higher education". The group Senderos also gives scholarships to high school seniors to continue their education, and provides academic tutoring and skill classes to both the youth and adults. Lazos Oaxaquenos focuses on building a Oaxaca community in Northern California, helping make people aware of different services that are available to them. Specifically, they focus on communication between the local government, consulates, media (newspapers, TV, etc.) and the people.
