= Cayman Islands International Film Festival =

Film festival held in the Cayman Islands

The Cayman Islands International Film Festival, also called CayFilm, is held annually in the Cayman Islands. The festival opened in June 2015, with an introductory event in 2014 being attended by Terrence Howard and Jon Chu.

In the first year approximately 600 films were submitted to the festival from more than 50 countries. Of these, about 200 were selected to be shown; among them were some 30 locally made films. The opening event was a showing of the film "Serena". The prizes were given by Alexa Vega and Carlos Pena. The festival included workshops with Loren Carpenter, Brian Cox, James V. Hart, Paul Schrader and Wes Studi. Reno Wilson attended.

In its second year, July 1–4, 2016, Cayfilm presented a 'Star Wars' theme with special guest appearances from cast and crew. This included one of the original producers, Robert Watts, Jeremy Bulloch (Boba Fett), model-maker and special effects master Lorne Peterson and sound designer Ben Burtt.

Cayfilm 2016 also saw the 10 year reunion of 'Haven', the 2006 thriller from Frank E. Flowers. Cast members Zoe Saldaña, Anthony Mackie and Victor Rasuk attended the festival, hosting a panel prior to a never-before-seen director’s cut of the movie.

2016's Lifetime Achievement award was presented to Producer Gary Lucchesi for his role in more than 60 films, including “Million Dollar Baby,” the “Underworld” franchise, “The Lincoln Lawyer,” “Runaway Bride,” and “Arlington Road”.

Cayfilm 2017 will be held from June 30 to July 3. CayFilm is a member the Caribbean Association of Film Festivals.
