= List of festivals in Florida =

Festivals of Florida
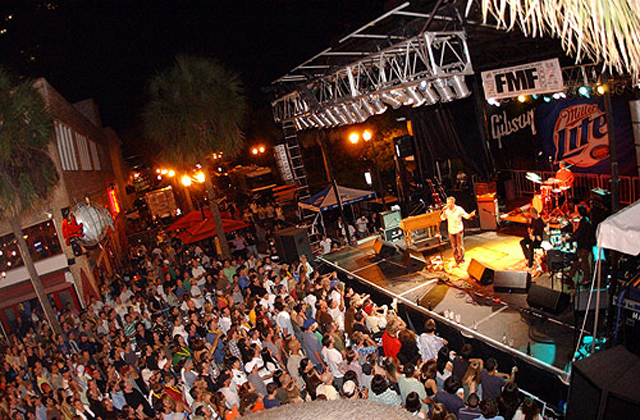

Related topics
- Festivals of the United States; lists of festivals by state or region; Georgia; Louisiana; Michigan; New Jersey; Pennsylvania; Virginia); culture of Florida; tourism in Florida

The following is an incomplete list of festivals in Florida.

== Festivals in Florida ==
=== Arts, cultural, and other ===
- Anime Festival Orlando
- Anime South
- Biketoberfest
- Billy Bowlegs Pirate Festival
- Calle Ocho Festival
- Chalo Nitka
- Coconut Grove Art Festival
- Daytona Beach Bike Week
- De Soto Heritage Festival
- Epcot International Flower & Garden Festival
- FAN:dom Con
- Fantasy Fest
- Festival Miami
- Floral City Heritage Days
- Florida Animation Festival
- Florida Azalea Festival
- Florida State Fair
- Florida Strawberry Festival
- Florida Swampfest
- Gasparilla Pirate Festival
- Glory at the Gardens
- Great Gulfcoast Arts Festival
- Guavaween
- Jacksonville Pride
- Key West Literary Seminar
- King Mango Strut
- MegaCon
- Metrocon
- Miami Book Fair International
- National Horse Show
- Night of Joy
- Orlando International Fringe Theater Festival
- Orlando Oktoberfest
- Pensacola Comic Convention
- Ringling International Arts Festival
- Sant'Yago Knight Parade
- Sarasota Chalk Festival
- South Florida Fair
- Southern Shakespeare Festival
- Springtime Tallahassee
- Winter Equestrian Festival
- World of Nations Celebration

=== Music festivals ===
- 9 Mile Music Festival
- AURA Music and Arts Festival
- Cornerstone Florida
- Electric Daisy Carnival
- The Fest
- Florida Folk Festival
- Florida Music Festival
- The Florida SpringFest
- Harvest of Hope Fest
- Hotel Carolina
- Jacksonville Jazz Festival
- La Musica
- Lakeside Jazz Festival
- Langerado
- Miami Nice Jazz Festival
- Miami Pop Festival (December 1968)
- Miami Pop Festival (May 1968)
- Okeechobee Music & Arts Festival
- Orange Drive Miami Beach Music Festival
- Planetfest
- Rock the Universe
- Springing the Blues
- SunFest
- Suwannee Hulaween
- Ultra Music Festival
- Urban Beach Week
- Wanee Music Festival
- Winter Music Conference

=== Film festivals ===
- American Black Film Festival
- Borscht Film Festival
- Florida Film Festival
- Gasparilla Film Festival
- India International Film Festival of Tampa Bay
- Israel Film Festival
- Jacksonville Film Festival
- Love Your Shorts Film Festival
- Miami International Film Festival
- Miami Short Film Festival
- Orlando Film Festival
- Palm Beach International Film Festival
- Sarasota Film Festival
- Sicilian Film Festival
- Tampa Bay Jewish Film Festival
- Tampa International Gay and Lesbian Film Festival

=== Food festivals ===
- Cuban Sandwich Festivals:
  - Fort Myers
  - Kissimmee
  - Ybor City, Tampa
  - Hernando County
- Taste of Latino Festivals:
  - Fort Myers
  - Springhill (Hernando County)
  - Jacksonville
  - Kissimmee
  - Ybor City, Tampa

ID	Festival	Location	County	Category
1	Giant Shiitake Mushroom Festival	Interlachen	Putnam	Second weekend in January, mushroom growing and mushroom eating contest
1	Miami Fine Wine & Spirits Festival	Coconut Grove	Miami-Dade	Wine, food, chocolate, and spirits
1	Northeast Florida Veg Fest	Jacksonville	Duval	Vegetables
1	Fairchild's Annual International Chocolate Festival	Coral Gables	Miami-Dade	Chocolate
1	Grovetoberfest	Coconut Grove	Miami-Dade	Beer
1	Brew on the Bay	Key Largo	Monroe	Beer
1	Coconut Grove Seafood Festival	Coconut Grove	Miami-Dade	Seafood
1	Sunshine State Steak Cook-Off	Ave Maria	Collier	Steak
1	The Festival of Chocolate - Tampa, FL	Tampa	Hillsborough	Chocolate
1	99.9 Kiss Country Regional Chili Cookoff	Pembroke Pines	Broward	Chili
1	Goodland Mullet Festival	Marco Island	Collier	Seafood, mullet
1	Naples Winter Wine Festival	Naples	Collier	Wine
1	Buckhead Ridge Catfish Festival	Buckhead Ridge	Glades	Seafood, catfish
1	Central Florida BBQ Festival	Sebring	Highlands	
1	Fellsmere Frog Leg Festival	Fellsmere	Indian River	Wild game
1	Taste of Pine Island	Pine Island	Lee	Various
1	Florida Keys Seafood Festival	Key West	Monroe	Seafood
1	Great Southern Gumbo Cook-off	Sandestin	Okaloosa	Gumbo
1	Sunshine Regional Chili Cook-Off	Kissimmee	Osceola	Chili
1	Kumquat Festival	Dade City	Pasco	Kumquat
1	Fine Wine & Food Festival	Oldsmar	Pinellas	
1	Jim's Chili Cookoff	St. Petersburg	Pinellas	Chili
1	Lakeland Pig Festival	Lakeland	Polk	
2	Panama City Mardi Gras Festival	Panama City	Bay	Various
2	Grant Seafood Festival	Grant	Brevard	Seafood
2	Titusville Sunrise Rotary Club Chili Cookoff	Titusville	Brevard	
2	Taste of the Beach	Lauderdale-By-The-Sea	Broward	
2	Everglades Seafood Festival	Everglades	Collier	Seafood
2	'Do It At The Line' Super Chili Bowl Cookoff	Pensacola	Escambia	Chili
2	Sour Orange Festival	Lakeport	Glades	Orange
2	Grillin & Chillin on Main Wauchula	Wauchula	Hardee	BBQ
2	Swamp Cabbage Festival	La Belle	Hendry	Swamp cabbage
2	Plant City Arts Council Chili Cookoff	Plant City	Hillsborough	Chili
2	Taste of Chocolate Festival	Plant City	Hillsborough	Chocolate
2	Einstein on Wine	Tampa	Hillsborough	Wine
2	Flan Fest	Tampa	Hillsborough	Flan
2	Lakeridge Winefest	Clermont	Lake	Wine
2	Cortez Commercial Fishing Festival	Cortez	Manatee	
2	Food Network South Beach Wine and Food Festival	Miami	Miami-Dade	
2	Chili in the Village Regional Cookoff	Pinecrest	Miami-Dade	Chili
2	Florida Keys Regional Cookoff	Key Largo	Monroe	Various
2	Firefight at Spanish Springs	The Villages	Lake, Sumter	
2	Delray Beach Garlic Fest	Delray Beach	Palm Beach	Garlic
2	"Smoke on the Water" BBQ	Winter Haven	Polk	BBQ
2	San Sebastian Winefest	St. Augustine	St. Johns	Wine
2	Florida Fiddler Crab Festival	Steinhatchee	Taylor	Seafood, gumbo, BBQ
3	Aliquity Chili Fest	Brandon	Hillsborough	Various, beer
3	Desoto Seafood Festival	Bradenton	Manatee	Seafood
3	The Big Squeeze	Palm Bay	Brevard	Orange
3	A Sip of Wine... A Taste of Heaven	Pembroke Pines	Broward	Wine
3	Placida Rotary Seafood Festival	Placida	Charlotte	Seafood
3	Floral City Strawberry Festival	Floral City	Citrus	Strawberries
3	Naples Country Jam Chili Cookoff	Naples	Collier	Chili
3	Hog Wild and Pig Crazy Barbecue Cook-off	Lake City	Columbia	BBQ, pork
3	Backyard BBQ Blast	Jacksonville	Duval	BBQ
3	Great Atlantic Seafood Festival	Jacksonville Beach	Duval	Seafood
3	Beulah Sausage Festival	Pensacola	Escambia	Sausage
3	Gulf Coast Regional Chili Cookoff	Eastpoint	Franklin	Chili
3	Florida Strawberry Festival	Plant City	Hillsborough	Strawberry
3	Denning's Lounge Chili Cookoff	Tampa	Hillsborough	Chili
3	Florida Brewers Guild BeerFest	Tampa	Hillsborough	Beer
3	Steve Otto Chili Cook-off	Tampa	Hillsborough	Chili
3	Astor Chamber Of Commerce Chili Cook-off	Astor	Lake	Chili
3	Pig on the Pond	Clermont	Lake	Pork
3	Estero High Key Club Chili Cookoff	Estero	Lee	Chili
3	Fort Myers Beach Shrimp Festival	Fort Myers Beach	Lee	Seafood, shrimp
3	Cactus Jack's Chili Cookoff	Salt Springs	Marion	Chili
3	Coral Gables Wine & Food Festival	Coral Gables	Miami-Dade	Wine
3	Miami Wine and Food Festival	Miami	Miami-Dade	Wine
3	Marathon Seafood Festival	Marathon	Monroe	Seafood
3	Speckled Perch Festival	Okeechobee	Okeechobee	Seafood, fish
3	Top of the Lake BBQ Affair	Okeechobee	Okeechobee	BBQ
3	Boca Bacchanal Winefest	Boca Raton	Palm Beach	Wine
3	Cajun Cafe on the Bayou Crawfish Festival	Pinellas Park	Pinellas	
3	Chili Blaze	Pinellas Park	Pinellas	Chili
3	Safety Harbor Seafood Festival (formerly Harbor Sounds Seafood & Music Festival)	Safety Harbor	Pinellas	Seafood
3	Cajun Zydeco Crawfish Festival	St. Petersburg	Pinellas	
3	Bluegrass & BBQ Festival	Auburndale	Polk	BBQ
3	Englewood Beach / Burr Smidt Memorial Chili Cookoff	Englewood	Sarasota	Chili
3	Florida Sunshine Pod Cookoff	Englewood	Sarasota	
3	St. Augustine Lions Seafood Festival	St. Augustine	St. Johns	Seafood
4	National Oyster Festival	Orange Beach	Escambia	Seafood
4	Festival of Chocolate at UCF Arena	Orlando	Orange	Chocolate
4	Bradford County Strawberry Festival	Starke	Bradford	Strawberry
4	New Times Beerfest	Fort Lauderdale	Broward	Beer
4	Pompano Beach Seafood Festival	Pompano Beach	Broward	Seafood
4	'Make it Mild or Make it Wild' Chili Cook-off	Jacksonville	Duval	Chili
4	A Taste of the Coast An Artful Affair	Port Saint Joe	Gulf	Various
4	Sugar Festival	Clewiston	Hendry	Sugar
4	Spring Jubilee Chili Cook-off	Riverview	Hillsborough	Chili
4	Bern's Winefest	Tampa	Hillsborough	Wine
4	Spring Fish Fry	Leesburg	Lake	Seafood, fish
4	Celebrate Bonita District Chili Cookoff	Bonita Springs	Lee	Chili
4	Taste of the Islands	Sanibel	Lee	Various
4	Florida Wine Festival	Tallahassee	Leon	Wine
4	Taste of Key West	Key West	Monroe	Various
4	Boggy Bayou Mullet Festival	Niceville	Okaloosa	Seafood, mullet
4	Sandestin Wine Festival	Sandestin	Okaloosa	Wine
4	Rajuncajun Crawfish Festival	Orlando	Orange	Seafood, crawfish
4	Great American Pie Festival	Orlando	Osceola	Pie
4	Cajun Blues Crawfish Festival	Palm Beach	Palm Beach	Seafood, crawfish
4	Sweet Corn Fiesta	West Palm Beach	Palm Beach	Corn
4	St. Johns River Catfish Festival	Crescent City	Putnam	Seafood, catfish
4	Florida Winefest & Auction	Sarasota	Sarasota	Wine
4	A Taste of St. Augustine	St. Augustine	St. Johns	Various
4	An Evening with EPIC Chefs	St. Augustine	St. Johns	Various
4	Rhythm and Ribs Festival	St. Augustine	St. Johns	BBQ ribs
4	Shrimp Fest	Ponce Inlet	Volusia	Seafood, shrimp
4	Taste of New Tampa	Tampa	Hillsborough	Various
5	Ragin Cajun Crawfish Festival, Memorial Day weekend	Orange Beach	Escambia	Crawfish
5	Ragin Cajun Crawfish Festival, Memorial Day weekend	Pompano Beach	Broward	Crawfish
5	BBQ & Blues Festival	Pensacola	Escambia	BBQ
5	Windsor Zucchini Festival	Gainesville	Alachua	Zucchini
5	Newberry Watermelon Festival	Newberry	Alachua	Watermelon
5	Las Olas Wine and Food Festival	Fort Lauderdale	Broward	Wine
5	Taste of Collier	Naples	Collier	Various
5	Taste of Fort Myers Beach Family Festival	Fort Myers Beach	Lee	Seafood
5	Arcadia Watermelon Festival	Arcadia	DeSoto	Watermelon
5	World of Nations Celebration	Jacksonville	Duval	Various
5	25th Annual Pensacola Crawfish Fiestival	Downtown Pensacola	Escambia	Seafood, crawfish
5	Tupelo Honey Festival	Wewahitchka	Gulf	Honey
5	Ruskin Tomato Festival	Ruskin	Hillsborough	Tomato
5	BBQfest	Tampa	Hillsborough	BBQ
5	Indian River County Firefighters' Chili Cookoff	Vero Beach	Indian River	Chili
5	Taste of Mount Dora	Mount Dora	Lake	Various
5	Biltmore International Food & Wine Weekend	Coral Gables	Miami-Dade	Various
5	Isle of Eight Flags Shrimp Festival	Fernandina Beach	Nassau	Seafood, shrimp
5	Zellwood Sweet Corn Festival	Zellwood	Orange	Corn
5	Smoke ‘n Blues BBQ	St Cloud	Osceola	BBQ
5	Cotee River Seafood Festival and Boat Show	New Port Richey	Pasco	Seafood
5	Palatka Blue Crab Festival	Palatka	Putnam	Seafood, blue crab
5	Daytona Beach Bayou Boil	Daytona Beach	Volusia	Cajun
5	DeLand Wild Game Feast	DeLand	Volusia	Wild game
5	Panacea Blue Crab Festival	Panacea	Wakulla	Seafood, crab
6	Bikini Parade - BEER & BBQ Festival, July 4 weekend	Pensacola	Escambia	BBQ, beer
6	A World of Dreams Epicurean Feast	Jacksonville	Duval	Various
6	Food Fight	Jacksonville	Duval	Various
6	Jefferson County Watermelon Festival	Monticello	Jefferson	Fruit, watermelon
6	Chiefland Watermelon Festival	Chiefland	Levy	Fruit, watermelon
6	Florida Keys Tropical Fruit Fiesta	Marathon	Monroe	Fruit
6	Northeast Florida Blueberry Festival	Callahan	Nassau	Fruit, blueberry
6	Taste of Boynton	Boynton Beach	Palm Beach	Various
6	Taste of Pinellas	St. Petersburg	Pinellas	Various
6	Bostwick Blueberry Festival	Bostwick	Putnam	Fruit, blueberry
6	Wellborn Blueberry Festival	Wellborn	Suwannee	Fruit, blueberry
6	Shores Wine and Food Festival	Daytona Beach	Volusia	
6	Panhandle Watermelon Festival	Chipley	Washington	Fruit, watermelon
7	Folio Weekly Beer & Music Festival	Jacksonville	Duval	Beer
7	Mangomania Tropical Fruit Fair	Pine Island	Lee	Fruit
7	Clamerica Celebration	Cedar Key	Levy	Seafood, clam
7	International Mango Festival	Coral Gables	Miami-Dade	Fruit, mango
7	Key West Food and Wine Festival	Key West	Monroe	Various
7	Gavel & Grapes Festival	Tarpon Springs	Pinellas	Fruit, grape
8	Gulf County Scallop Festival	Port Saint Joe	Gulf	Seafood, scallop
8	WaZoo	Tampa	Hillsborough	Various
8	San Sebastian Harvest Festival & Grape Stomp	St. Augustine	St. Johns	Fruit, grape
9	Fall Seafood and Pirate Fest	Panama City	Bay	Seafood
9	Q-Fest BBQ & Music Festival	Grant	Brevard	BBQ
9	Taste of Weston	Fort Lauderdale	Broward	Various
9	Hollywood Beach Clambake	Hollywood	Broward	Seafood, clam
9	Florida Barbecue Association Funcook	Crystal River	Citrus	BBQ
9	Emerald Coast Brew Fest & Beach Party	Pensacola	Escambia	Beer
9	Pensacola Seafood Festival	Downtown Pensacola	Escambia	Seafood
9	Seafood & Mini Wine Fest	Sandestin	Okaloosa	Seafood
9	Florida Cracker Oyster Festival	Orlando	Orange	Seafood, oyster
9	Taste of Clearwater	Clearwater	Pinellas	Various
9	'I Like It Hot!' Festival & Barbecue	Largo	Pinellas	BBQ
9	Sun-N-Fun RV Resort Chili Cookoff	Sarasota	Sarasota	Chili
10	Oyster & Beer Festival	Pensacola	Escambia	Seafood
10	Sarasota Pumpkin Festival	Sarasota	Sarasota	Various
10	New Smyrna Beach Uncorked	New Smyrna Beach	Volusia	Various
10	Indian Summer Seafood Festival	Panama City Beach	Bay	Seafood
10	Hospice Chili Cookoff	Wilton Manors	Broward	Chili
10	Southeast Chili Cookoff	Homosassa	Citrus	Chili
10	Waterfront Chili Cookoff	Homosassa	Citrus	Chili
10	Caring Chefs	Jacksonville	Duval	Various
10	Hernando County BBQ & Rodeo Festival	Brooksville	Hernando	BBQ
10	Hernando Beach Seafood Festival	Hernando Beach	Hernando	Seafood
10	Taste at Bay Street	Tampa	Hillsborough	Various
10	Minneola Fall Fest BBQ Contest	Minneola	Lake	BBQ
10	Cedar Key Seafood Festival	Cedar Key, 3rd weekend in October	Levy	Seafood
10	Central Florida Harvest and Peanut Festival	Williston	Levy	Peanut
10	Hunsader Farms Pumpkin Festival	Bradenton	Manatee	Pumpkin
10	Mighty Mullet Maritime Festival	Panacea	Wakulla	Mullet, Seafood
10	St. Marks Stone Crab Festival	St. Marks	Wakulla	Stone Crab, Seafood
10	Stone Crab, Seafood, and Wine Festival	Longboat Key	Manatee	Seafood, stone crab
10	Belleview Chili Cook-off	Belleview	Marion	Chili
10	Marion County Chili Cook-Off	Ocala	Marion	Chili
10	Chocolate Festival	Coral Gables	Miami-Dade	Chocolate
10	Stone Crab Fest	Summerland Key	Monroe	Seafood, stone crab
10	Destin Seafood Festival	Destin	Okaloosa	Seafood
10	Epcot International Food & Wine Festival	Orlando	Orange	Various
10	Frenchy's Stone Crab Festival	Clearwater Beach	Pinellas	Seafood, stone crab
10	John's Pass Seafood Festival	Madeira Beach	Pinellas	Seafood
10	Taste of Plant City	Plant City	Pinellas	Various
10	Leepa-Rattner Museum of Art Stone Crab Fest	Tarpon Springs	Pinellas	Seafood, stone crab
10	Mulberry Fine Swine At The Pit	Mulberry	Polk	BBQ Pork
10	Gabbert Farm Peanut Festival	Jay	Santa Rosa	Peanut
10	Great Bowls of Fire Chili Cookoff	DeLand	Volusia	Chili
11	The Festival of Chocolate - Palm Beach County Convention Center	West Palm Beach	Palm Beach	Chocolate
11	First Coast Ham Jam	Green Cove Springs	Clay	Pork
11	Nosh Fest - S. Florida's Jewish Food Festival	Cooper City	Broward	Jewish foods
11	Florida Seafood Festival	Apalachicola	Franklin	Seafood
11	Plant City Pig Jam	Plant City	Hillsborough	Pork
11	Ruskin Seafood Festival	Ruskin	Hillsborough	Seafood
11	Zoofari	Tampa	Hillsborough	Various
11	Sebastian Clambake Lagoon Festival	Sebastian	Indian River	Seafood, clam
11	Leesburg Chili Cook-Off	Leesburg	Lake	Chili
11	Fort Myers Taste of the Town	Fort Myers	Lee	Various
11	Greek Food Festival	Tallahassee	Leon	
11	Tallahassee Wine and Food Festival	Tallahassee	Leon	
11	Taste of Manatee	Bradenton	Manatee	
11	Jerk Fest Jerk Festival	Sunrise	Broward	Meat, Caribbean jerk seasoning
11	Jensen Beach Pineapple Festival	Jensen Beach	Martin	Fruit, pineapple
11	Orlando Beer Festival	Orlando	Orange	Beer
11	Palm Beach County Firefighters/Paramedics M.D.A. Chili Cookoff	Lake Worth	Palm Beach	Chili
11	Hudson Seafest	Hudson	Pasco	Seafood
11	Land o' Lakes Flapjack Festival	Land o' Lakes	Pasco	Pancake
11	Chiliblast	Clearwater	Pinellas	Chili
11	Dunedin Wines the Blues	Dunedin	Pinellas	Wine
11	Taste of Gulfport	Gulfport	Pinellas	
11	Safety Harbor Wine Festival	Safety Harbor	Pinellas	Wine
11	Ribfest	St. Petersburg	Pinellas	BBQ ribs
12	Beefcember Fest	Starke	Bradford	Beef
12	Death By Chocolate	Largo	Pinellas	Chocolate
12	Cheesecake Challenge	St. Augustine	St. Johns	Cheesecake
13	Treasure Coast Seafood Festival	Port St. Lucie	St. Lucie	Seafood
14	Annual Chili Cook-Off to Benefit the Boys and Girls Clubs of St. Lucie County	Fort Pierce at the Havert L. Fenn Center	St. Lucie	Chili
16	Crawfish Festival	Downtown Orlando	Orange County	Seafood
16	Taste of Little Italy	Port St. Lucie & Jupiter	St. Lucie & Palm Beach	Italian
16	Great American Burgerfest	St. Augustine	St. Johns	Hamburgers

== See also ==
- List of festivals in the United States
