= Silvano Monasterios =

- Born: Silvano Antonio Monasterios Delgado; October 30, 1964 (age 61); Caracas, Venezuela
- Genres: Jazz; Latin; Third stream
- Occupations: Musician; Composer; Orchestrator
- Instrument: Piano
- Years active: 1982–present
- Labels: Dogleg Music; Forever Music; Savant Records

Silvano Monasterios (born October 30, 1964) is a Venezuelan jazz musician, pianist, composer and orchestrator.

== Early life ==
Born in Caracas, Monasterios has been considered as one of the major jazz artists to emerge from Venezuela. He grew up surrounded by jazz music and developed his piano playing and harmony skills by exploring music on his own.

Known for his lyrical style of playing, Monasterios was particularly influenced by the work of Chick Corea, Herbie Hancock, Keith Jarrett and McCoy Tyner. He received formal musical training at the José Angel Lamas School of Music and began his professional career at the age of 18, combining this knowledge and these influences by performing and recording with some of the most prominent Venezuelan artists of the time.

== Career ==
In 1989, Monasterios traveled to Miami, Florida to participate in the Miami Jazz Festival, where he earned an award for Best Instrumental Soloist performance, which granted him a scholarship from Miami Dade College. He then moved to the United States in 1990 to attend college, and later received other recognition from the University of Colorado in 1991, earning Outstanding Soloist award honors.

Entering 1997, Monasterios released his first album, Roads Not Taken, to expand his own sound world with a selection of eight original compositions, which featured upright bassist Marc Johnson and multi-instrumentalist Ira Sullivan among other invitees. After that, he received a music scholarship from the University of Miami, from which he earned a Bachelor of Music degree in 1995. Never stationary or stale, he next returned to the University of Miami in 2002 and obtained a master's degree in Jazz Piano and Pedagogy.

In between, Monasterios still performing and recording with a significant number of jazz musicians, like Randy Brecker, Donald Byrd, Larry Coryell, Paquito D’Rivera, Allan Harris, Terumasa Hino, Freddie Hubbard, Dave Liebman, Othello Molineaux, Nathen Page, Claudio Roditi, Arturo Sandoval, Néstor Torres, Dave Valentin and Jeff 'Tain' Watts, as well as for performers including Dee Dee Bridgewater, Shakira and David Lee Roth. As a result, Down Beat magazine honors followed in 2005 with the Best Jazz Instrumental Soloist award for the 28th Annual Student Music Awards. Additionally, he also won in the category of Original Song, Outstanding Performance for his composition, Ávila. It prompted the release of his second album, Fostered, in 2006, where all eight tracks were written by himself, including the aforementioned Ávila, while leading a quintet of young musicians.

In 2007, Monasterios produced the album Jazz Impressions 1, recorded live at the NSU Art Museum Fort Lauderdale in Florida, which is an inspired, piano-led set of straight-ahead jazz co-led by Monasterios, bassist Mark Egan and drummer Paul Wertico, whose repertoire included more original songs.

Thereafter, Monasterios collaborated with percussionist Sammy Figueroa in The Magician, released in 2007 and submitted for nomination to the 50th Annual Grammy Awards as Best Latin Jazz Album, in which Monasterios provided performances, orchestrations, production, and two compositions including the title track. Subsequently, the Miami New Times newspaper named Monasterios as Best Jazz Musician in their Best of Miami issue of June 11, 2009.

In 2011 Monasterios formed a new quintet and completed a recording of his exploration in the form of eight original tunes, entitled Unconditional. This collection shows craftsmanship and fine improvisations, with an emphasis on composition and attention to detail. Besides, Monasterios offers an assortment of Venezuelan percussion instruments and rhythms, in a firm understanding of his roots without deviating from the jazz mainstream and the urban music landscape.

Currently, Monasterios continues performing in different cities of the United States, and regularly conducts clinics, master classes and workshops at colleges, universities and arts centers around the World, including the prestigious National Network of Youth and Children's Orchestras of Venezuela, also known as El Sistema.
