= List of killings by law enforcement officers in the United States, April 2010 =

This is a list of people reported killed by non-military law enforcement officers in the United States in April 2010, whether in the line of duty or not, and regardless of reason or method. The listing documents the occurrence of a death, making no implications regarding wrongdoing or justification on the part of the person killed or officer involved. Killings are arranged by date of the incident that caused death. Different death dates, if known, are noted in the description. The table below lists 32 people.

== April 2010 ==
Date	Name (Age) of Deceased	State (city)	Description
2010-04-30	Adam Eiman Wehinger (34)	Oregon (Medford)	Wehinger barricaded himself in a residence and was in possession of a firearm. There were reports of gunshots prior to the police arriving, and he allegedly fired additional shots inside the residence after police arrived. He was shot by officers when he opened the front door and brandished his weapon at them. Wehinger had earlier made statements to the effect that he wanted officers to kill him.
2010-04-28	Dominique Smith (20)	Texas (San Antonio)	Just after 3 a.m. officers followed Smith after learning the 1986 Cadillac he was driving had been reported stolen. Smith stopped at an intersection and the officers pulled up behind him and turned on their lights. The officers told Smith to show his hands, which were in the front pockets of a sweatshirt. Instead, Smith reached back into the car. When he stood up, he again wouldn't show his hands. Smith moved aggressively toward the officers and when he refused to stop, both officers fired.
2010-04-26	Donald Hoffman (27)	New Jersey (Hammonton)	Hoffman was fatally shot by Detective Keith Carmack and Detective Michael Kelly members of the Atlantic County Prosecutor's Office Emergency Response Team after he pointed a handgun at an officer and refused to obey repeated commands to drop the weapon.
2010-04-26	Johnny Harris (48)	Wisconsin (Oak Creek / Caledonia)	Harris had just led Oak Creek officers on a chase into Caledonia and crashed into a vacant building. He then used the vehicle to hit one of the officers multiple times in an attempt to run him over. Another officer shot Harris.
2010-04-26	Bradford Sarten (55)	California (San Diego)	Sarten, who family members said suffered from paranoid schizophrenia, reportedly grabbed a knife and got into a confrontation with police. His family had called the police to "evaluate the man's mental health". When they arrived he was armed with a knife. When ordered to put down the knife, he refused and instead told officers they would have to kill him. He then approached the officers, one of whom fired his gun, fatally wounding Sarten.
2010-04-26	James Chaffin (30)	Nevada (Nye)	Police responded to a 911 call from a woman who claimed Chaffin shot at her. She fled to a local casino with Chaffin following in another vehicle. Just as cruisers arrived in the casino parking lot and officers exited their vehicle, Chaffin fired multiple shots at one of the officers, killing the officer. Another officer, reacting to the incident, shot and killed Chaffin.
2010-04-25	Lejoy Grissom (27)	California (Culver City)	Officers responded to a report of an armed robbery at a store. According to witnesses, the robber brandished a chrome handgun and fled with merchandise from the store. A Culver City police officer saw a car driving unusually and noticed that the passenger, Grissom, matched the description given of the suspected robber, officials said. The officer pulled the car over. While getting Grissom to exit the car, the officer fired his weapon, fatally wounding Grissom. Sheriff's Lt. Dave Dolson told the Associated Press: Grissom "steps out of the car and at some point, despite commands to keep his hands up, he drops his hands to his waistband area. He made some furtive moves, and so one of the officers thought he was going for a gun and so shot him." "We have some independent witnesses who have corroborated the officers' version of events," Dolson said. Authorities said a chrome handgun was recovered at the scene.
2010-04-24	Izael Jackson (18)	Illinois (Chicago)	Chicago Police say they shot Izael Jackson after he jumped out of a vehicle and opened fire on officers following a traffic stop Saturday night.
2010-04-24	Arnold Alfonso (40)	Florida (Lehigh Acres)	
2010-04-23	Gary Costa (37)	California (Pittsburg)	Costa was fatally wounded by police after charging at officers with a knife following a pursuit in which he was driving a stolen car. He was a suspect in the murder of his girlfriend and setting her apartment on fire.
2010-04-23	Reuben Hollis (29)	Georgia (Fulton County)	After an officer pulled a vehicle over one of three people inside the vehicle got out with a weapon and was shot by the officer. A weapon was recovered from the deceased suspect, and two other people inside the vehicle were arrested. The suspects were believed to have been involved an overnight carjacking.
2010-04-22	Julio Garcia (46)	California (Cudahy)	Julio Garcia, a 46-year-old Latino, was shot and killed by a Maywood police officer April 22, according to authorities. The incident took place shortly before 9:30 a.m. and Garcia was pronounced dead at the scene minutes later. No officers were injured in the incident, authorities said. The shooting is under investigation by the Los Angeles County Sheriff's Department.
2010-04-19	Clevonta Reynolds (18)	Texas (Arlington)	Reynolds was shot during a melee among teenagers. An officer identified himself as such, then approached the teens and told Reynolds to take his hands out of his pockets, but Reynolds refused. A gun was found in Reynolds' pocket.
2010-04-19	Gene Mason Bagley (59)	Georgia (Lawrenceville)	Shot after lunging at police with knife in hand. Police were responding to report of man damaging a vehicle with a knife. When police arrived Bagley refused to drop knife.
2010-04-16	David Elcock (28)	New Jersey (Patterson)	Police officers and a negotiation team gathered outside of the home of David Elcock. They spent four hours trying to coerce Elcock into surrendering. At approximately 7:00 p.m., Elcock fled and refused warnings from police to drop his weapon. He fired at the police officers, who returned fire, killing Elcock.
2010-04-16	Tyler Spann (20)	Florida (Venice)	
2010-04-15	Timothy Scott Hanson (55)	Minnesota (Woodbury)	Officers arrived about 11:30 p.m. Gunfire erupted. Police Chief Lee Vague said Friday that Hanson fired first. He was shot and killed.
2010-04-14	Joseph Patrick Gannon, III (48)	Alaska (Anchorage)	Gannon was making threats at police officers and his elderly mother during a standoff. He then came out of her apartment holding an air pistol made to look like a real handgun. His actions were perceived as an immediate deadly threat and three officers fatally shot him. The Office of Special Prosecutions said the use of deadly force was justified.
2010-04-14	Zak Edward Robert Reeves (35)	Colorado (Denver)	Officers responding to a 9-1-1 call from Reeves' wife, encountered him on his porch with a 12" meat cleaver and a 13" knife. Reeves charged officers, and was hit with a "sponge" bullet from a less than lethal weapon. Reeves continued to advance on officers. A Denver PD officer then fired one shot at Reeves. Reeves died less than an hour later.
2010-04-11	Eddie Silcox (48)	Florida (Floral City)	
2010-04-11	Larry Bowling (64)	Florida (Cocoa)	
2010-04-09	Russell Doza (49)	Oklahoma (Tulsa)	Doza was shot at the clubhouse of a motorcycle club while officers were attempting to serve a drug warrant.
2010-04-09	Brian Harris (39)	Louisiana (New Orleans)	The officers began speaking with Harris, who had barricaded himself in a bedroom. Officers also said that he was armed with a knife. The whole exchange between Harris and police took just 10 minutes. It ended with officers tasing Harris (who pulled the taser prongs out of his body both times), then opening fire.
2010-04-09	Bernard King (47)	Florida (Winter Park)	
2010-04-09	Richard Montero (44)	Florida (West Palm Beach)	
2010-04-06	Nathan Howard (40)	Arizona (Scottsdale)	Officers responded to a call from a woman in an apartment complex. The woman who called said her husband, Nathan Howard, 41, was out of control, breaking things and suicidal said a police spokesman. As an officer approached the front door to the residence he was confronted by Howard who was holding two knives. Howard ignored verbal commands to drop the knives and charged at the officer, who then fired his service pistol and wounded the suspect. Howard stopped his attack and was handcuffed. Howard remained conscious and combative as more officers arrived. He was taken to a medical center where he was pronounced dead about three hours later.
2010-04-04	Armando Gallegos (29)	Colorado (Walsenburgh)	According to a Walsenburg Police Department Press Release, around 9:30 p.m. two officers arrived at 45 Stacy drive. One officer went to the front of the home, the other to the back. The officer-involved in shooting says he saw Armando Gallegos, 29, about to kill his girlfriend. He then opened fire to, "protect the woman from a deadly attack."
2010-04-03	Willie Miller (25)	Illinois (Chicago)	Officers gave chase northbound on Christiana and into the west alley. They say that is where Miller turned and pointed his weapon at pursuing officers. Police said at this point, one of the officers fired and fatally wounded Miller. Miller's mother and sister, who was also at the party, dispute this version of events and said he did not have a gun.
2010-04-02	Ronald Hale (33)	Georgia (Atlanta)	Shot after pulling out a gun. Police were approaching Hale for questioning regarding a report of domestic violence.
2010-04-01	Michael Romero (32)	New York (Brooklyn)	Romero leaned into the window of an undercover officer's vehicle, aiming a pistol at the driver's head. A second officer exited the passenger side of the car, ran around the car and fatally shot Romero.
2010-04-01	Reshird Lyles (28)	Illinois (Chicago)	Police said plainclothes officers were patrolling around Pine Avenue and Huron Street due to "an ongoing gang conflict" in the neighborhood when they heard gunshots. Officers saw several people running away, one of them with a gun in his hand, police said. The officers ordered him to stop, but he ran through a gangway and into an alley, police said. An officer approached the man and ordered him to drop the gun. The man pointed the gun at the officer and the officer shot him, police said. The department said a gun was recovered at the scene.
2010-01-01	Timothy Baum (54)	Florida (Bonita Springs)	

== See also ==
- Death in custody § United States
- Henry A. Wallace Police Crime Public Database
- List of cases of police brutality
- List of countries with annual rates and counts for killings by law enforcement officers
- List of law enforcement officers killed in the line of duty in the United States
- List of law enforcement officers convicted for an on-duty killing in the United States
- List of police reforms related to the George Floyd protests
- List of unarmed African Americans killed by law enforcement officers in the United States
- Lists of killings by law enforcement officers
- Police brutality in the United States
- Police misconduct § United States
- Police riot § United States
- Police use of deadly force in the United States
