= Oyster festival =

Food festival centered on the oyster

An oyster festival is a food festival centered on the oyster. There are a number of oyster festivals worldwide, including the following:

== Australia ==
- The Brisbane Water Oyster Festival — Woy Woy, New South Wales
- Narooma, New South Wales — Narooma, New South Wales. The Narooma Oyster Festival showcases the renowned Sydney Rock Oysters grown in the region as well as other local produce. The multi-award winning event (Regional Tourism Awards) includes entertainment for young and old, oyster tasting, cooking demonstrations, shucking competitions, bars and music. The 2014 event, notably, attracted an influx of tourists from China and abroad, traveling to taste some of the world's finest Sydney Rock Oysters. The festival is organized by a sub committee of the Narooma Chamber of Commerce and dedicated local volunteers.
- Ceduna, South Australia — Ceduna, South Australia

== Canada ==
- The Tyne Valley Oyster Festival, an annual festival in Tyne Valley, Prince Edward Island, featuring the Canadian Oyster Shucking Championship, the PEI Oyster Grading Championship, Miss Oyster Pearl Pageant, Best Decorated Oyster Box, Best Dressed Oyster Fisher, Oyster Suppers and More...
- Festival des Huitres in Maisonette, New Brunswick

== Chile ==
- Fiesta de la Ostra de Cardonal, in Pelluhue (Maule Region)

== Croatia ==
- The Oyster Festival (Croatian: Fešta od kamenica), held every March in Ston, located at the south of isthmus of the Pelješac peninsula in southern part of Croatia, also known for production of high-quality wines and sea salt.

== France ==
- La fête de l’huître, a July festival that takes place at Riec-sur-Belon, in the region of Brittany.
- Oyster festivals around Arcachon Bay: every year each municipality of the bay celebrate Arcachon oyster in its own way in the course of the summer.

== Ireland ==
- Galway International Oyster Festival, is deemed the oldest international oyster festival in the world and takes place on the last weekend of September each year. Galway, on the west coast of Ireland is the only place in Ireland when you can get native flat Galway Oysters in natural wild oyster beds. The festival was created to celebrate the start of the native oyster season as they are only available when there is an 'r' in the month. The Galway International Oyster & Seafood Festival is held over 3 days with marquee events, live music, seafood trails, oyster hot spots, masquerade winners party and the highly competitive World Oyster Opening Championship.
- Ballylongford International Oyster Festival in Ballylongford, County Kerry, Ireland.
- Clarenbridge Oyster Festival in Clarenbridge. Galway, Ireland

== Singapore ==
- The World Oyster Festival, an annual, month-long event hosted by Greenwood Fish Market in Singapore. During which, more than 20 types of oysters are imported from across the globe for patrons to enjoy at their restaurants. Usually celebrated throughout the month of July, the event has been held since 2012.

== South Africa ==
- The Knysna Oyster Festival, an annual winter festival held in Knysna, South Africa

== Spain ==
The north coast of Spain is home to numerous festivals whose main theme is the oyster.

- Festival Somos la Ostra, in Castropol (Asturias)
- Festa da Ostra de A Lanzada-Noalla, in Sanxenxo (Galicia)
- Festa da Ostra de Arcade, in Soutomaior (Galicia)
- Festa de l'Ostra de L'Ampolla (Catalonia)

== United Kingdom ==
=== England ===
- The London Oyster Championships - held at Bentley's Oyster Bar & Grill in London, is home to the English Oyster Open, with the winner progressing onto the Oyster Opening World Championship at the Galway International Oyster Festival, as well as an England's Best Dressed contest.
- Oyster Feast is an annual event in Colchester, Essex, England, held since the 14th century. The modern feast has been held since 1845.
- Whitstable Oyster Festival, a July Oyster Festival taking place in Whitstable, Kent, England.
- Falmouth Oyster Festival held at Falmouth, Cornwall, England in October.

=== Northern Ireland ===
- Hillsborough Oyster Festival in Hillsborough, County Down, Northern Ireland.

=== Scotland ===
- Stranraer Oyster Festival held in September in Stranraer, Dumfries & Galloway, Scotland celebrating Loch Ryan native oysters.

== United States ==
- Amite Oyster Festival annual festival in Amite, Louisiana
- Arcata Bay Oyster Festival — annually celebrated in June on the plaza in Arcata, California
- Berks County Celtic Oyster Festival — Mohnton, Pennsylvania
- "Chesapeake Bay Maritime Museum". "OysterFest".celebration in St. Michaels, Maryland falls the first Saturday in November and offers food, entertainment, vendors, educational opportunities, boat rides, hands-on oyster tonging all on the beautiful Miles River.
- Chincoteague Oyster Festival — Chincoteague, Virginia
- Florida Seafood Festival — Apalachicola, Florida
- Lowcountry Oyster Festival — Charleston, South Carolina
- Milford Oyster Festival — an annual food and entertainment festival in Milford, Connecticut, since 1975.
- Norwalk Oyster Festival — an annual food and entertainment festival in Norwalk, Connecticut, since 1978.
- North Carolina Oyster Festival — Ocean Isle, NC
- Ostraval — Williamstown, Massachusetts, The annual April 30 farewell to oysters for the summer.
- OysterFest — in Shelton, Washington
- The Oyster Festival — Oyster Bay, New York "TheOysterFestival".
- The Oyster Whelm — Northern Berkshire County, Massachusetts, since 2017.
- San Francisco Oyster Fest — San Francisco, California
- San Diego OysterFest, San Diego California
- St. Mary's County Oyster Festival and U.S. National Oyster Shucking Contest — Leonardtown, Maryland"St. Mary's County Maryland Oyster Festival, U.S. National Oyster Shucking Contest and National Oyster Cookoff Contest".
- Oysterfest — Fulton, Texas
- Ocean State Oyster Festival — Providence, Rhode Island
- Red Bank Guinness Oyster Festival, New Jersey, held every September
- Urbanna Oyster Festival — Urbanna, Virginia, since 1957
- Wellfleet OysterFest — https://www.wellfleetoa.org/wellfleet-oysterfest an annual festival in Wellfleet, Massachusetts (Cape Cod)
- Taste of Wrightsville Beach — Wrightsville Beach, North Carolina
- Bluefield, West Virginia Shriner Patrol Annual Oyster Dinner every October since 1975.
- Hilton Head Oyster Festival — Hilton Head, South Carolina
- Old Goshenhoppen Reformed Church Oyster Festival — Upper Salford, PA, held every September since 1877
