= Fellsmere Frog Leg Festival =

Coordinates: 27.766°N 80.602°W

The Fellsmere Frog Leg Festival is a city fundraiser serving frog legs and alligator tail held annually in Fellsmere, Florida in the third week of January. The first festival, proposed by Fran Adams, and other local residents, was planned in 1990 in order to increase the funds of Fellsmere's recreation department. Since that time, festival attendance has grown tremendously and the city of Fellsmere continues to benefit from it.

In 2006, the festival took place from January 19 to 22; in 2007 it took place January 18 to 21; in 2008, it was held from January 17 to 20. In 2020 and 2021, strict measures were in place, such as wearing masks and social distancing to combat the COVID-19 pandemic. The festival was held January 19–22 in 2023. For the 2024 festival (January 18–21), 3,000 pounds (1,400 kg) of frogs legs from Louisiana and 2,500 pounds (1,100 kg) of alligator from South Florida were procured.

== See also ==
- List of festivals in Florida
