= Milford Oyster Festival =

Cultural festival in Milford, Connecticut

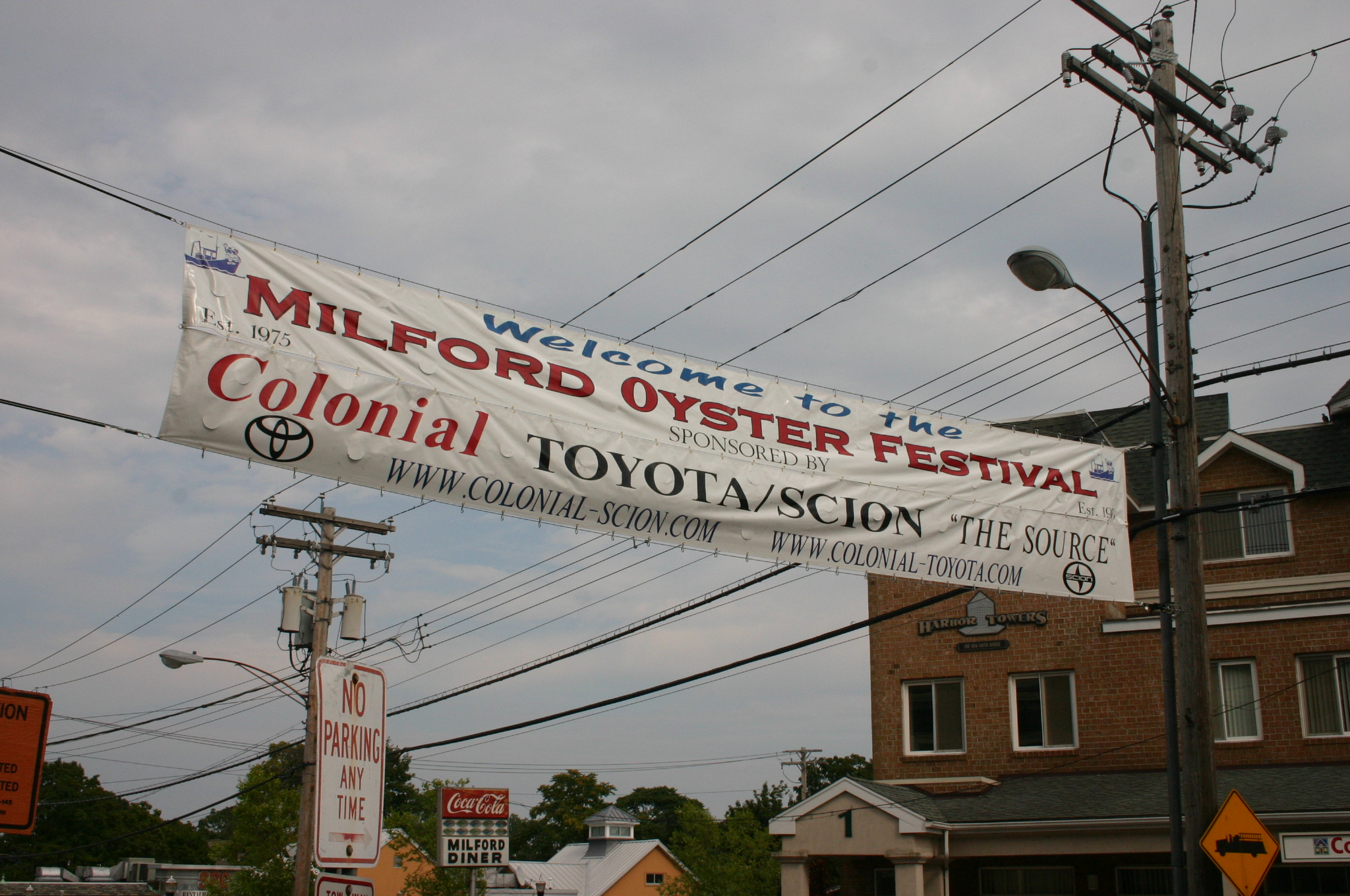
- 2006 Milford Oyster Festival Banner
- Genre: cultural festival
- Date: Third Saturday in August
- Begins: 10:00 A.M. EDT (UTC-4)
- Ends: 6:00 P.M. EDT
- Frequency: Annual
- Locations: Milford, Connecticut, USA
- Coordinates: 41.222161175268°N 73.053467568824°W
- Years active: 51
- Inaugurated: Saturday, 23 August 1975
- Most recent: Saturday, August 15, 2026
- Participants: 50,000–60,000 annual approx.
- Website: http://www.milfordoysterfestival.org/
- Next – Saturday, August 21, 2027

Milford Oyster Festival, sometimes shortened to "Oysterfest," is an annual cultural festival held on the third Saturday of August throughout the city of Milford, Connecticut. As a major tourist attraction, billed as the largest one-day festival in the New England region and listed among the top 10 annual events in Connecticut, the Oyster Festival draws over 50,000 attendees each year. It is planned by the non-profit organization Annual Milford Oyster Festival, inc. (AMOF), largely run by volunteers.

The festival hosts a wide variety of activities for all ages, including arts, crafts, music, sports, amusement rides, food, and oyster shucking.

== History ==
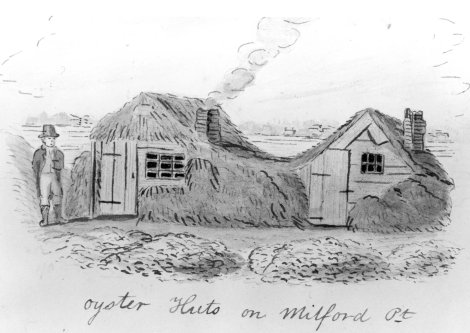
Oyster Huts on Milford Point a sketch by John Warner Barber for his Historical Collections of Connecticut (1836).

The first Milford Oyster Festival was held on the Milford Green and Fowler Field on 23 August 1975. Major founders of the oysterfest include Diano Nytko, first chairperson of the Milford Chamber of Commerce, and Robert N. Cooke, for whom the Bob Cooke Skin Cancer Foundation was named.

Since then the oyster festival has become firmly established as an annual Milford tradition, held rain or shine. In the past, the oysterfest was held over two days, but that proved to be too much a burden on the organizers.

While initially established as an oyster festival, the presence of actual oysters gradually faded after some time and were absent for many years outside of the festival's name. In 2005, oysters returned to the festival, provided by the East Coast Shellfish Growers Association. They have been there ever since.

Starting in 2009, Milford began requiring that the non-profit AMOF reimburse the city, which spends $30,000–50,000 to host the festival each year. As a result of this decision, AMOF could no longer allow other local non-profits to sell beer at the event, as it is a major source of income for many of the non-profits. This led Alderman Ben Blake to express concern that the festival may "lose its local flavor" as "nonprofit groups [are driven] out of the Oyster Festival food court."

In 2019 and resuming in 2021, all oysters in the festival are harvested from Milford waters, provided by Briarpatch Enterprises, Inc.

The 2020 festival was canceled due to the COVID-19 pandemic. The festival will be held as usual in 2021. Although no festival was held in the previous year, which would have been the 46th, the festival committee decided to refer to the 2021 festival the 47th Annual Milford Oyster Festival "to recognize the year that didn't occur."

In 2025, due to rising costs and a lack of volunteers the organizers of the Oyster Festival decided to turn the event into a evening only event on Fowler Field.

== Musical acts ==
Every festival also includes a headliner band.

=== Headliner by year ===
- 2024 — Little Feat, Living Colour, Lead Singers of Classic Rock - Jason Scheff and Tommy DeCarlo
- 2023 — Lou Gramm
- 2022 — Scott Stapp
- 2021 - Southside Johnny & the Asbury Jukes
- 2020 – NONE
- 2019 — Badfish, The Cringe, Extreme
- 2018 — Eddie Money, John Cafferty and the Beaver Brown Band
- 2017 — Blackberry Smoke
- 2016 — Blue Öyster Cult
- 2015 — Gin Blossoms
- 2014 — Bret Michaels
- 2013 — Blues Traveler
- 2012 — Kansas
- 2011 — The Marshall Tucker Band
- 2010 — Soul Asylum
- 2009 — John Cafferty & The Beaver Brown Band
- 2008 — Foghat
- 2007 — The Smithereens
- 2006 — The Spin Doctors
- 2005 — Southside Johnny & the Asbury Jukes
- 2004 — Blue Öyster Cult
- 2003 — Marshall Tucker Band
- 2002 — Voices of Classic Rock (Spencer Davis, Dave Jenkins, Larry Hoppen, Joe Lynn Turner, Ronnie Hammond, and Dennis Frederiksen)
- 2001 — Mark Farner (Grand Funk Railroad), with opening act Cubistic Jack
- 2000 — Joan Jett and the Blackhearts
- 1999 — Starship
- 1996 — Arlo Guthrie

== Fundraising ==
Many local and regional businesses, non-profits, and governmental groups have sponsored the event, including NBC Universal, TD Bank, and Whole Foods Market.

Money raised by AMOF during the festival has been donated for charitable purposes. In 2010, the major fundraiser of the festival was for Gulf coast fishing communities, whose oyster industries were struggling after being shut down by the BP's Deepwater Horizon oil spill.

== Notable participants ==
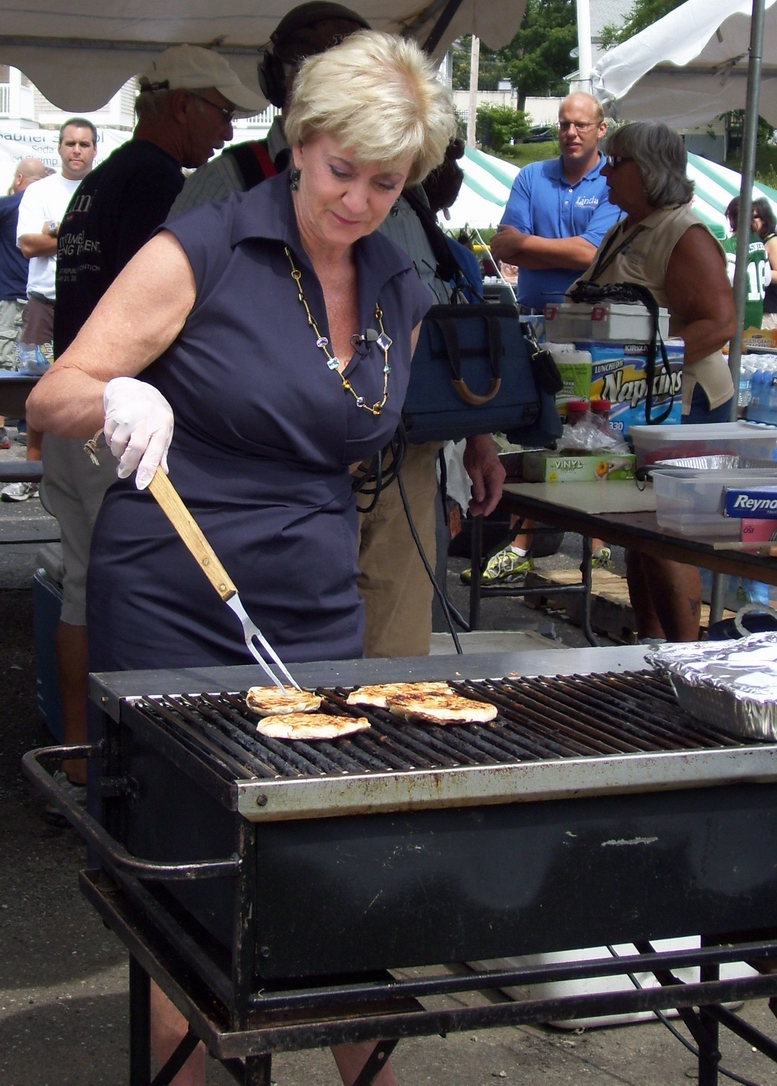
Linda McMahon takes a moment to grill some chicken with local Republican activists while on the campaign trail at the 2010 festival.

- Jodi Rell, the 72nd governor of Connecticut, attended the 2008 festival.
- Linda McMahon, a Republican politician, plunged a firefighter in a dunk tank in the "dunk your favorite firefighter" festival activity during her 2010 campaign for a seat in the US Senate for Connecticut.
- John A. Smith, a world-traveling sailor and writer, wrote, "It's kind of sad to hear that none of the oysters at the recent 'Oyster Festival' were from local waters and that most of the oyster boats are now in museums," in his book of travels Little Fish Big Pond while talking about Milford as his home town. (Note: In 2019 & resuming in 2021, all oysters at festival are from Milford waters.)

== Surrounding events ==
On the Friday evening before the oysterfest, there is a surrounding event called "Oyster Eve," which includes activities such as dancing, dining, and a 90-minute cruise on an 80-foot-long (24 m) schooner around the Long Island Sound. Around 1,500 people came to downtown Milford for Oyster Eve in 2010.

In 2010, the Daniel Street nightclub began hosting what they dubbed the "Inaugural Oyster Festival After Party" on the evening after the main events close. This year completes 16 years. There was no 2020 after party.

== See also ==
- Norwalk Oyster Festival
- Oyster festival
