= Norwalk Oyster Festival =

Coordinates: 41.0954°N 73.4155°W

Logo for the Oyster Festival

The Norwalk Oyster Festival is an annual fair in the city of Norwalk, Connecticut, United States, held on the first weekend after Labor Day in Veterans Park, near Long Island Sound.

Funds raised by the festival help the Norwalk Seaport Association maintain the Sheffield Island Lighthouse as well as develop science education classes. The festival is also used as a fundraiser by more than 20 other local non-profit organizations.

The festival has been run by the Norwalk Seaport Association, a non profit organization, since its inception in 1978. Average annual attendance exceeds 90,000. Each year, the Oyster Festival contributes over $5 million to the local economy.

It features various food, vendors, and entertainment, and celebrates the history of the oyster industry based in Norwalk. In the past, featured performers have included the Village People, Kansas, Charlie Daniels Band, Joe Walsh, Willie Nelson, Blood, Sweat & Tears, Tito Puente, Cheap Trick, Little Feat, The Monkees, Judy Collins, Up with People, and Little Richard.

== History ==
The 29th annual Oyster Festival took place Friday, September 8 to Sunday, September 10, 2006. Bo Bice, Dion, and Asia were featured performers.

The 30th annual festival took place September 7 to September 9, 2007 with the Village People heading up the entertainment, the band's third appearance. Jay and the Americans were also booked for the event.

The 31st annual festival took place September 5 to September 7, 2008. The festival was called off on Saturday the 6th to accommodate the rain from Hurricane Hanna. Los Lonely Boys performed Friday evening and Kathy Sledge performed Sunday evening.

The 43rd annual event is deferred to 2021 since there was no event in 2020 caused by COVID-19 pandemic.

The 45th annual festival took place on September 8 to September 10, 2023. It was hosted by the Norwalk Seaport Association and presented by First County Bank. Gary LeVox performed on September 9, 2023.

== Incidents and accidents ==
On September 8, 2013, 17 children and one adult were injured in an amusement ride accident in when a swing ride suffered a mechanical failure. Several injured were transported to Norwalk, Stamford and Bridgeport hospitals. None of the injuries were life-threatening.

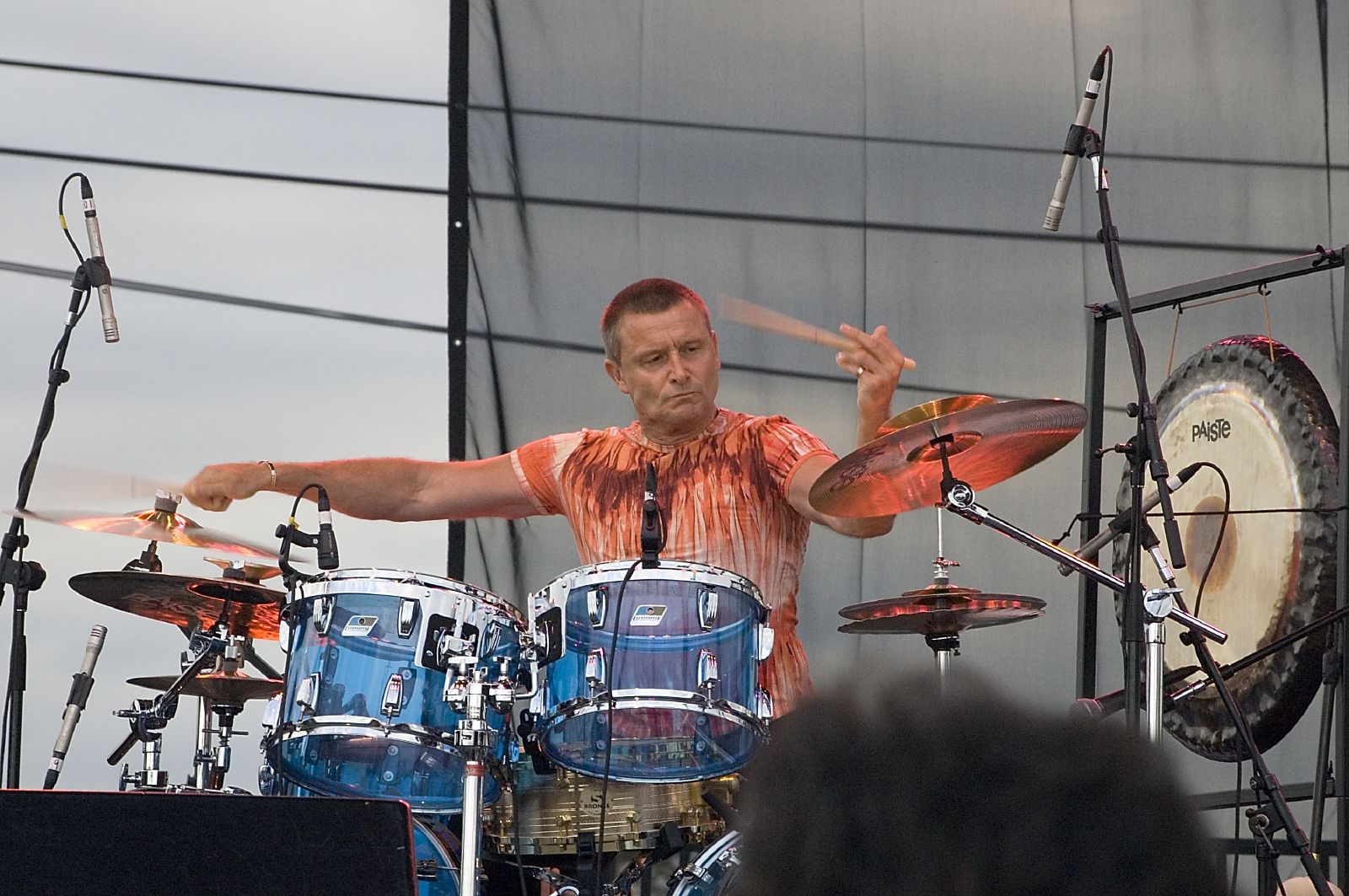
Carl Palmer of Asia at the 29th Norwalk Oyster Festival on September 10, 2006

== See also ==
- Oyster festival
- Milford Oyster Festival
