= Florida Strawberry Festival =

Annual festival in Plant City, Florida

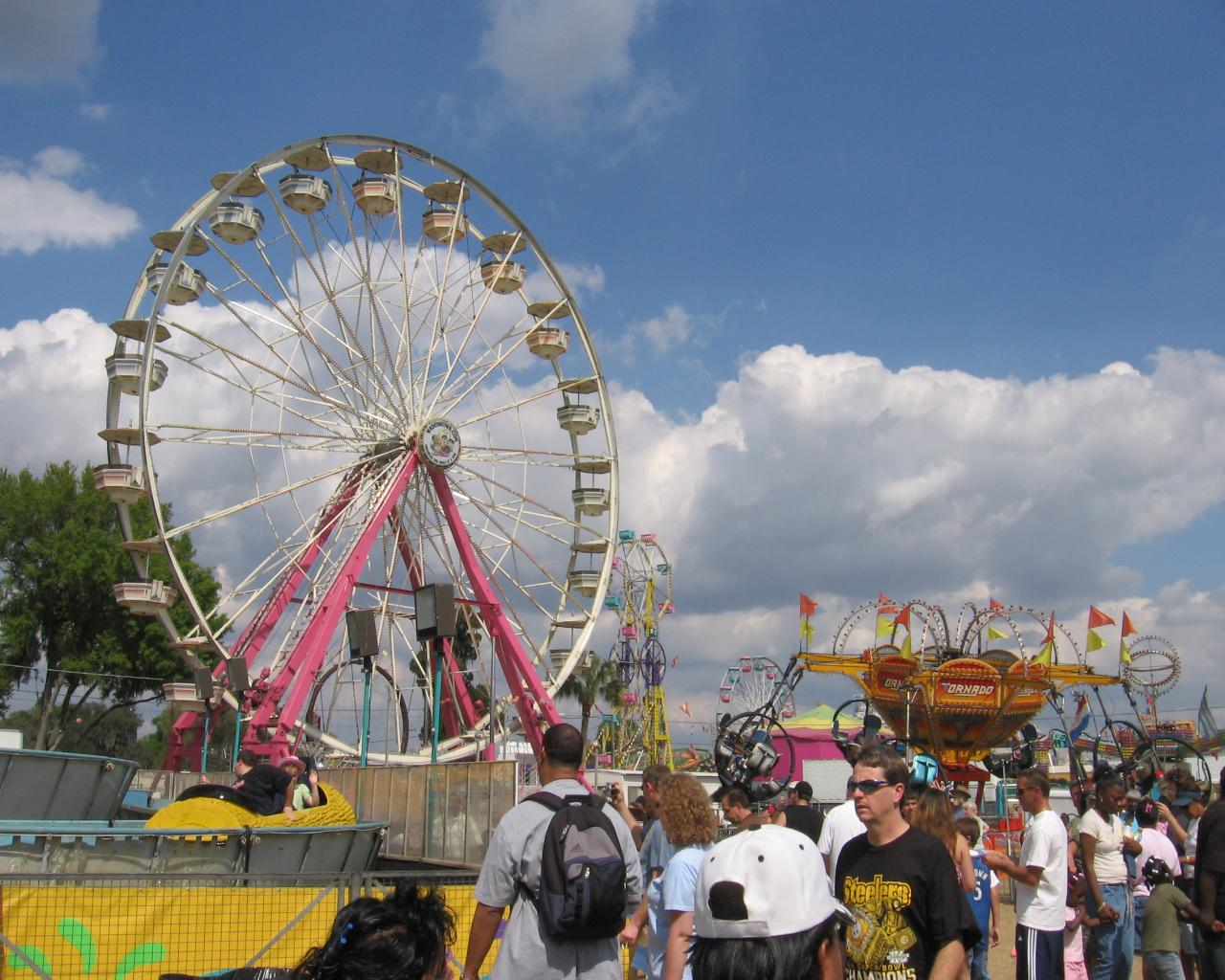
- Festival fairgrounds
- Status: Active
- Genre: Festival
- Frequency: Annual
- Location: Plant City, Florida
- Country: United States
- Inaugurated: 1930
- Website: flstrawberryfestival.com

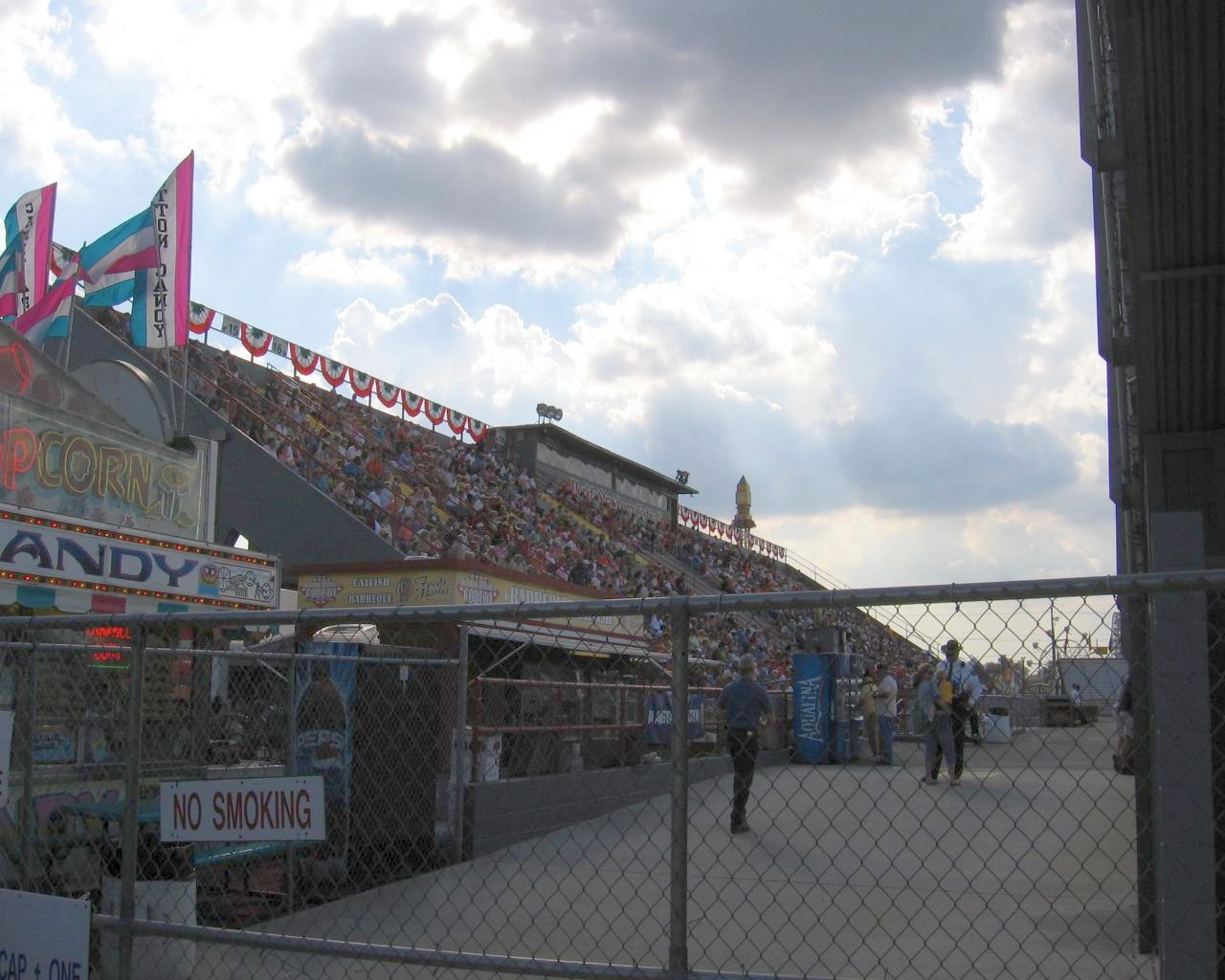
Festival stadium for music performances

The Florida Strawberry Festival is an annual event taking place in Plant City, Florida. The festival lasts 11 days and generates attendance of about half a million patrons from across central Florida and other areas. The festival ranks among the Top 40 Fairs in North America.

The festival is a venue for flea market-style craft and item sales, various free entertainment acts and events, a carnival midway, as well as musical concert performances.

== History ==
The idea of the strawberry festival was conceived of by the Plant City Lions Club in 1930, after several attempts made by locals to promote the local strawberry crop. The first Florida Strawberry Festival was held in the same year. The festival occurred annually for 11 years until World War II halted operations from 1941 to 1947. The American Legion, Post #26, helped get the festival reactivated in 1948.

== See also ==
- Florida food festivals
- List of strawberry topics
