= Floral City Heritage Hall Museum =

Museum in Floral City, Florida, United States

Coordinates: 28.74984°N 82.29497°W

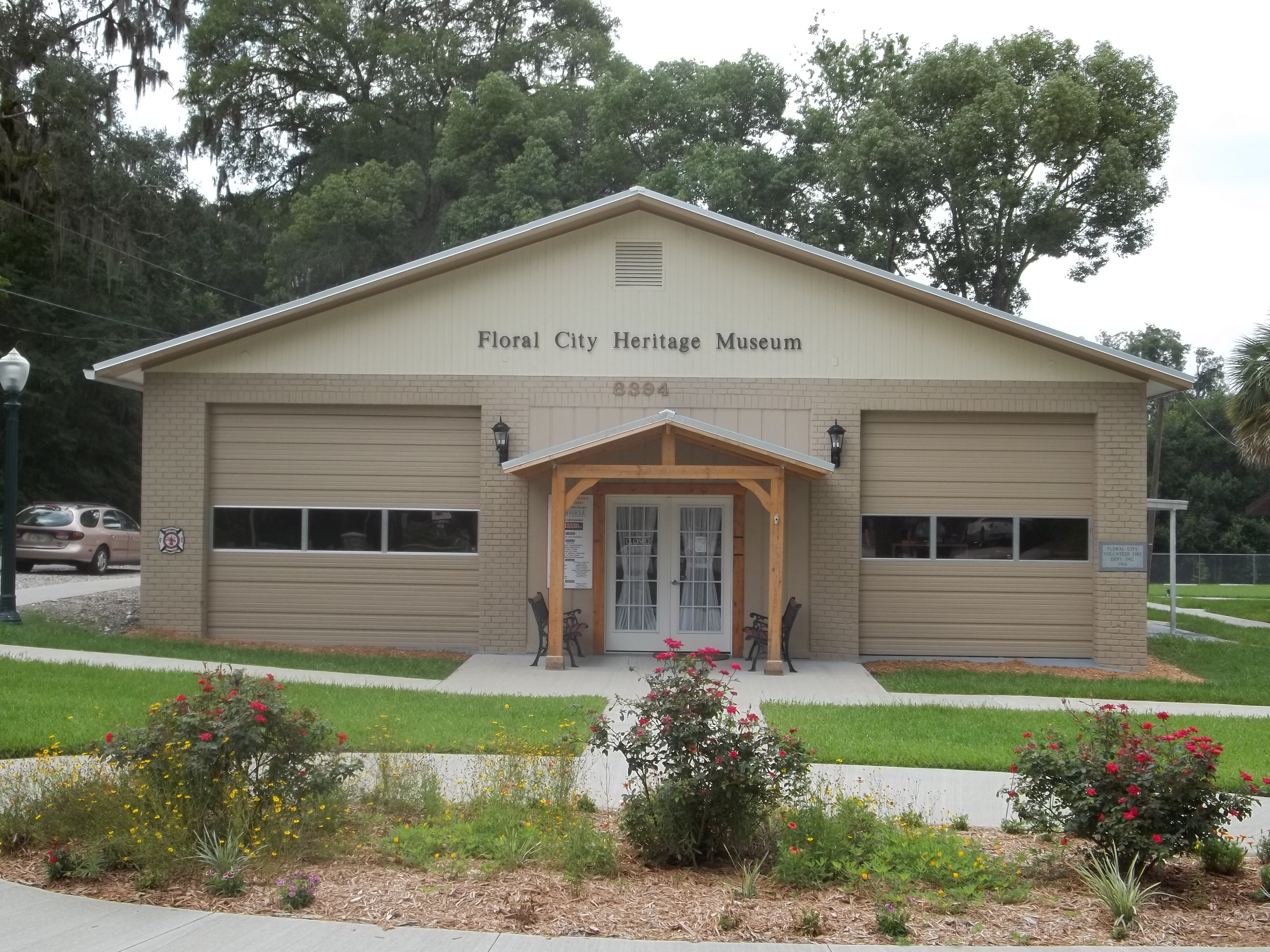
Floral City Heritage Museum

Floral City Heritage Hall Museum is a museum in Floral City, Florida, United States.

The museum is located in a Fire Station building in downtown Floral City. The fire station closed in January 2000 and the museum opened on December 4, 2009, for Floral City Heritage Days as the Heritage Museum & Country Store. It includes two galleries, a library, media center, and store. Offices, storage and a kitchen were under construction in 2014. In 2014, its website stated the museum is open Friday and Saturday from 10:00 a.m. to 2:00 p.m. as well as for special events. The museum is located next to the Community Building and Library on Orange Avenue, one block east of U.S. Highway 41. It is operated by the Floral City Heritage Council.

== Gallery ==
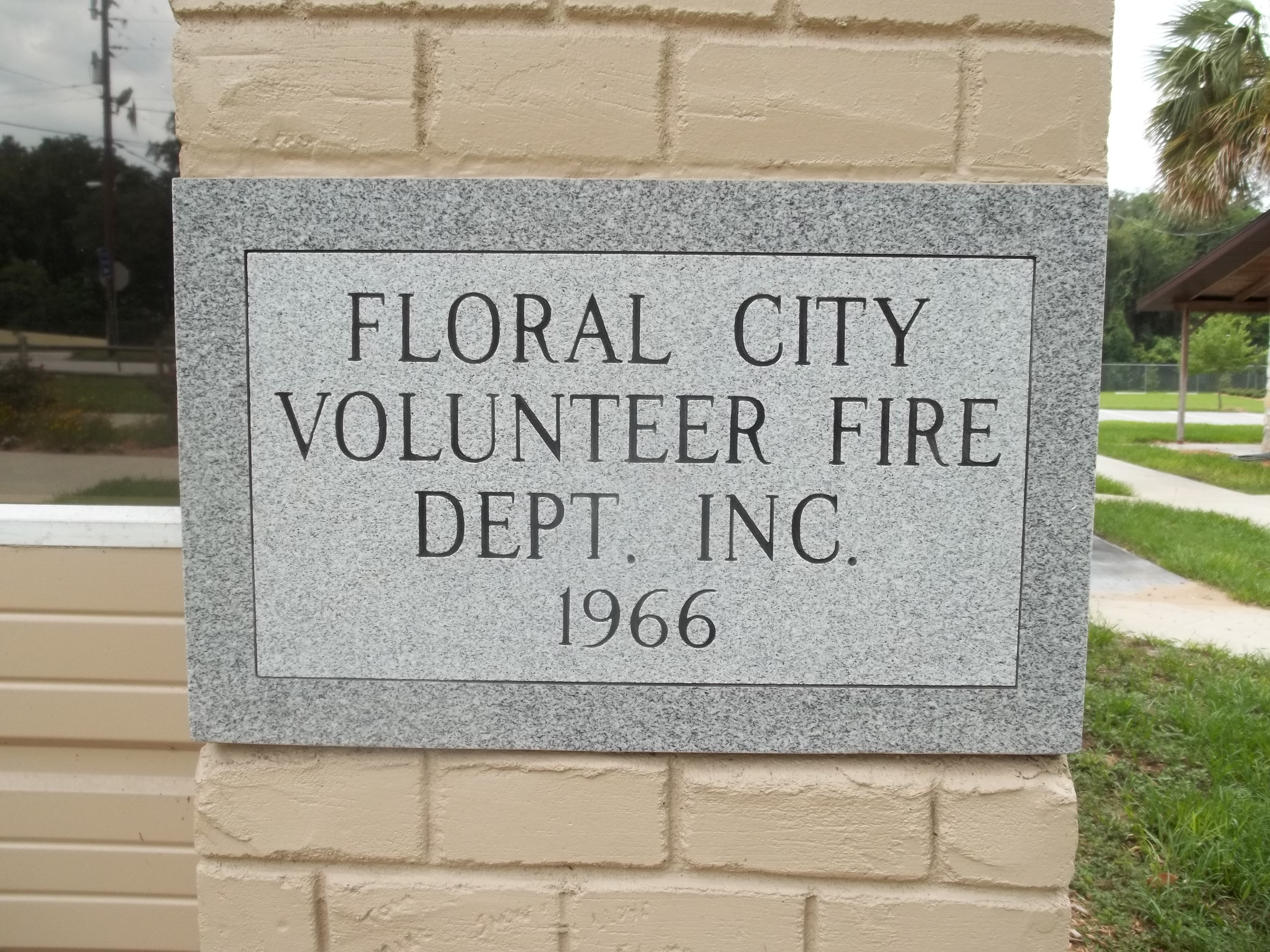
Floral City Heritage Museum cornerstone

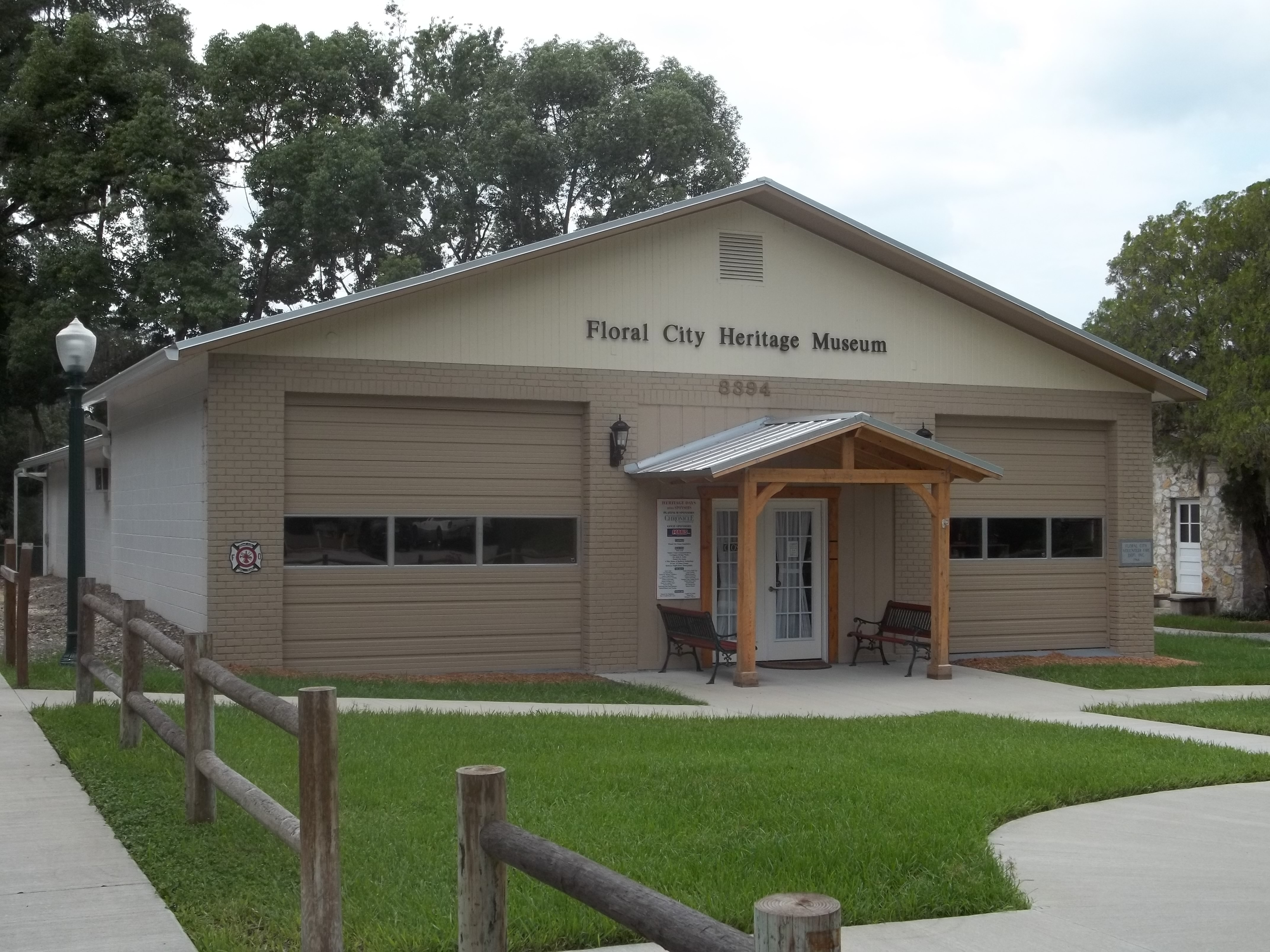
View of the Floral City Heritage Museum

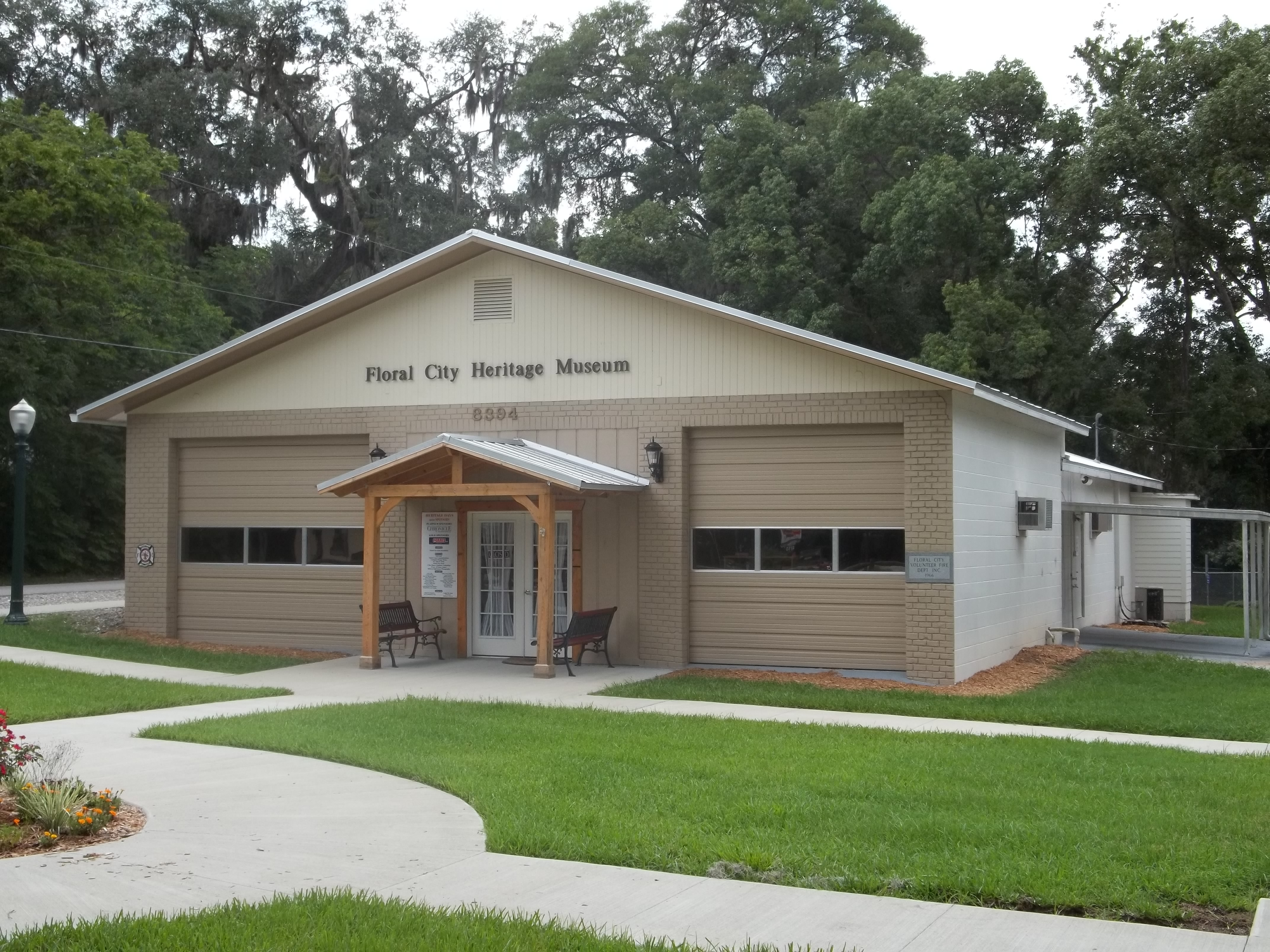
Another view of the Floral City Heritage Museum
