= Boggy Bayou Mullet Festival =

Annual seafood and arts festival in Niceville, Florida, USA (1977–2019)

Coordinates: 30.535232°N 86.492320°W

The Boggy Bayou Mullet Festival was an annual seafood and arts festival held in Niceville, Florida, United States, on the third Friday in October from 1977 to 2019. The main attractions were music, food (especially fried mullet), rides and a wide variety of arts and crafts.

This festival was named after the mullet, a fish found in abundance in the local waters. While it is a common misconception, the mullet haircut is not the origin of the festival's name.

The festival was founded by Walter Francis Spence Jr. in 1976. The first Mullet Festival took place on September 24, 1977, and soon lasted three days, starting the third Friday in October, and ended Sunday after dark. Alcohol is not served on Sunday. In recent years, the festival has typically had attendance over 40,000 for the weekend.

Chantal, Hollywood entertainment reporter for ABC's Good Morning America, broadcast from the festival on Friday, October 20, 1989. During the broadcast, festival founder, Francis Spence, and local James Campbell demonstrated how to catch and fry mullet.

In 2009, a third annual Boggy Bayou Mullet Festival T-shirt made by Tailgate Clothing Company appeared in Season 2 of the HBO series, True Blood (Episode 3 - "Scratches"). A representative from the show said that she found the shirt on a Web site she used to outfit some of the characters. A Mullet Festival T-shirt had also appeared on the CBS comedy How I Met Your Mother (Season 4, Episode 1), according to Niceville City Manager Lannie Corbin.

2019 was the 43rd and final. The next year, the COVID-19 pandemic, along with declining revenues and attendance in recent years, caused their doom.

== Entertainment History ==
2018 - Montgomery Gentry, Tracy Byrd, Tyler Farr, The Chee-Weez, Doctor Zarr's Amazing Funk Monster, Sweet Tea Trio, The Mulligans, Parker Willingham & Friends, Dan Eubanks, Roger Strickland

2017 - Tanya Tucker, Frankie Ballard, Chris Janson, The Molly Ringwalds, Troy Laz, Pelican212, Dan Eubanks, The Mulligans, Roger Strickland

2016 - Justin Moore, Joe Diffie, Chase Bryant, Confederate Railroad, Farewell Angelina, Brassfield Aly, Troy Laz Band, The Springs, Dan Eubanks, NWFSC Soundsations, Tommy Morse Band

2015 - Joe Nichols, Lonestar, Gloriana, Love and Theft, Dailey & Vincent, Mingo Fishtrap, Waylon Thibodeaux, Vince Vance & the Valiants, Big Water

2014 - Martina McBride, Dustin Lynch, Neal McCoy, Red Roots, Crystal Yates, Hunter Phelps, Mustang Sally, Blackjack Billy, Big Water

2013 - Vince Gill, Justin Moore, Thompson Square, The Swon Brothers, Blackjack Billy, The Isaacs, Ben Portsmouth Ultimate Elvis Tribute, Parker Willingham, Dr. Zarr's Amazing Funk Monster, Tayo Reed Explosion, Big Water, NWFSC Soundsations

2012 - Kellie Pickler, Jake Owen, Colt Ford, Florida Georgia Line, Due West, The Molly Ringwalds, Compozitionz, Brandon Bennett

2011 - Trace Adkins, Jake Owen, Brantley Gilbert, Sleepy Man Banjo Boys, Dr. Zarr's Amazing Funk Monster, The Alabama Blues Brothers, Big Swing and the Ballroom Blasters

2010 - Josh Turner, Joe Nichols, Brantley Gilbert, Jerrod Niemann, Ronnie McDowell, Damon Smith, Dr. Zarr's Amazing Funk Monster, The Tip Tops, The BluesCrabs, Bo Porter, Barry Fish Band

2009 - Billy Ray Cyrus, Blake Shelton, Chuck Wicks, Dr. Zarr's Amazing Funk Monster, Mustang Sally

2008 - Jason Aldean, Sara Evans, Rodney Atkins, Sweetwater Jade, Jeff Fiorello

2007 - Kenny Rogers, Blake Shelton, Gary Allan, Keith Anderson, The Grascals, The BluesCrabs

2006 - Travis Tritt, Lonestar, Blake Shelton, Trent Willmon, The Grascals, The Alley Cats

2005 - The Charlie Daniels Band, Terri Clark, Hot Apple Pie, Rockapella, The Fish Tank Band, Dread Clampitt

2004 - David Lee Murphy, Restless Heart, Craig Morgan, Little Texas, Isis, The Alley Cats, Chandler Mason

2003 - The Charlie Daniels Band, Dierks Bentley, Montgomery Gentry, The Alley Cats, Air Force Jazz Ensemble

2002 - Ricky Skaggs, Trick Pony, Emerson Drive, Daron Norwood, Mountain Heart, Little Big Town

2001 - Diamond Rio, Little River Band, Trick Pony, Isis, Sons of the Desert, The Clarke Family, The Alley Cats

2000 - Rick Springfield, Rascal Flatts, Tracy Lawrence, Eric Heatherly

1999 - Lonestar, Aaron Tippin, Sherrie Austin

1998 - Dixie Chicks, Rhett Akins, Ricochet, Exile

1997 - Neal McCoy, Exile

1996 - Lonestar, Ty Herndon, Mark Wills

1995 - Ty England, Ken Mellons

1994 - Daron Norwood

1993 - Mark Wills, Daron Norwood

1992 - Billy Ray Cyrus, Daron Norwood

1991 - The Temptations

1990 - The Drifters, The Platters

1989 - New Grass Revival

1988 - New Grass Revival, The Tams

== See also ==
- List of Florida food festivals
