= Fandom Con =

Annual multigenre convention held in Florida, U.S

Coordinates: 30°23′51″N 86°35′42″W

FANdom Con
- FANdom Con logo
- Status: Defunct
- Genre: Multigenre
- Venue: Emerald Coast Convention Center
- Location: Fort Walton Beach, Florida
- Country: United States
- Inaugurated: 2010
- Most recent: 2016
- Attendance: 1,400 in 2015
- Organizer: FANdom Conventions, Inc.

FANdom Con was an annual three-day multigenre convention held during November at the Emerald Coast Convention Center in Fort Walton Beach, Florida.

== Programming ==
The convention typically offered card game tournaments, concerts, cosplay contest, masquerade ball, panels, rave, vendors, videogame tournaments, and workshops. FANdom Con during the 2015 convention held a blood drive.

== History ==
FANdom Con was organized due to the lack of an anime convention in the Pensacola, Florida area. University of West Florida students decided to form a student organization, named Con-Quest, whose primary purpose would be to organize the convention. FANdom Con would be multigenre and cover anime, science fiction, and video games. It was estimated that 200-300 people would attend, but the convention instead attracted 752. The first event had a budget of $300 and UWF students entered for free.

FANdom Con moved to the Emerald Coast Convention Center in Fort Walton Beach, Florida starting in 2014 due to growth. Due to low attendance and a website credit card issue, the convention ended 2016 $15,000 below its budget. Due to several issues, the convention suspended operations in 2017.

=== Event history ===
Dates	Location	Atten.	Guests
October 23–24, 2010	University of West Florida Commons; Pensacola, Florida	750	Gina Biggs, Jennie Breeden, Ashley Clark, Carly Dorsey, Melfina, DJ Ryudo, Kevin Wolf, and Charity Youngblood.
November 12–13, 2011	University of West Florida Commons; Cannon Greens and Conference Center; Pensacola, Florida	1,183	Kenneth Davis, Delusions of Grandeur Theatre, Freya Dergunri, Sephi Hakubi, Melfina, DJ Ryudo, Eric Stuart, and Brian Woods.
October 27–28, 2012	University of West Florida Commons; Pensacola, Florida	1,400	Jennie Breeden, Ken Davis, Quinton Flynn, Tiffany Grant, Todd Haberkorn, Sephi Hakubi, Melfina, Steven Rath, DJ Ryudo, Mike Smith, Eric Stuart, Trixie J. Valentine, and Brian Woods.
October 18–20, 2013	University of West Florida Commons; Pensacola, Florida	1,800	Ken Davis, Karry English, Chris Fowler, Chuck Huber, Isaac Marion, The Offer, James R. Powell, Steven Rath, John Read, Julian Reid, DJ Ryudo, Mike Smith, Eric Stuart, Eric Vale, and Jerrad Vunovich.
November 7–9, 2014	Emerald Coast Convention Center; Fort Walton Beach, Florida	1,496	Andrea Albin, Athel, Robert Axelrod, Philo Barnhart, Bea Billany, Jessica Bright, Mario Bueno, Tony Burkett, Cobheran, Ken Davis, DJ Dere, Eric Dupre, Karry English, Arjay Floy, Todd Gosser, The Gov'na, Thomas Green, Jessica Grundy, Haiden Hazard, Chuck Huber, Alice Infinity, Kapalaka, Scott McNeil, Charles D. Moisant, NiGHTmaren, The Offer, Travis Patterson, Mark Rossmore, DJ Ryudo, Giles Shepard, Joanna Shirley, Mike Smith, Cletus Vandamme, and Liz Vickery.
November 6–8, 2015	Emerald Coast Convention Center; Fort Walton Beach, Florida	1,400	Eric Andrako, Betsy Averette, Philo Barnhar, Bruce Carr, DJ Dere, Eric Dupre, Eitanya, Arjay Floyd, Tiffany Grant, Josh Grelle, Haiden Hazard, Kiefer Hoelscher, Mike McFarland, Charles D. Moisant, Travis Patterson, DJ Ryudo, Tara Sands, Sarah Shortcake, Liz Vickery, and Dalton Wright.
November 11–13, 2016	Emerald Coast Convention Center; Fort Walton Beach, Florida		Philo Barnhart, Bea Billany, Bill Blair, Bruce Carr, Cam Clarke, Eric Dupre, Karry English, Arjay Floyd, Thomas Green, Kyle Hebert, Kiefer "ThatMontecore" Hoelscher, Kristen Hughey, Marin Miller, Charles D. Moisant, Travis Patterson, Scott Peavy, Julian Reid, DJ Ryudo, Steve Scott, Eric Stuart, and Dalton Wright.
