= Sicilian Film Festival =

The Sicilian Film Festival is a showcase of Sicilian directors and movies created in Miami in 2006 by Emanuele Viscuso. This American display of the Sicilian cinematography underlines the Sicilian cinema, literature and also its links with the international Cinema.

The SFF is the first organization that brought the existence and the importance of Sicilian cinema to the world stage by considering that Sicily is second in Italy after Rome in producing movies, that some of the best Italian directors are Sicilian (Giuseppe Tornatore won an Academy Award for Cinema Paradiso), that an incredible number of Hollywood stars are also Sicilian (consider Frank Sinatra, Vincente Minnelli, Martin Scorsese, Frank Capra, Susan Sarandon, Cyndi Lauper, Sylvester Stallone, Joseph Barbera), and that an impressive number of directors from all over the world have chosen Sicily as a site for shooting their movies. Given the enormous number of Sicilians and Sicilian descendants throughout the world tired of the unjust association of their name with the Mafia and in search of a new cultural identity as an alternative to the inaccurate stereotypes, its founder Viscuso appears to have developed the right formula for involving millions of people into a converging project and a merging association. This formula includes an international background granted by the fact that the SFF is held in the United States of America rather than in Sicily, as well as the fact that other local editions of SFF will be held in other cities in the USA and in the world. At the same time the close relationship with the mother-island is established by this same "Ambassador of Culture" with the creation of another extremely successful event in Sicily, the FIMO International Festival of Organ Music in the Historical Princedom of Castelbuono at its first edition in 2008.

The Sicilian Film Festival has fast become America's window on Sicilian cinematography and culture.

The city of Miami Beach, where the festival is located, made in 2007 the official proclamation of a Sicilian Film Festival Day in recognition of the cultural impact in the city.
