= Floral City Heritage Days =

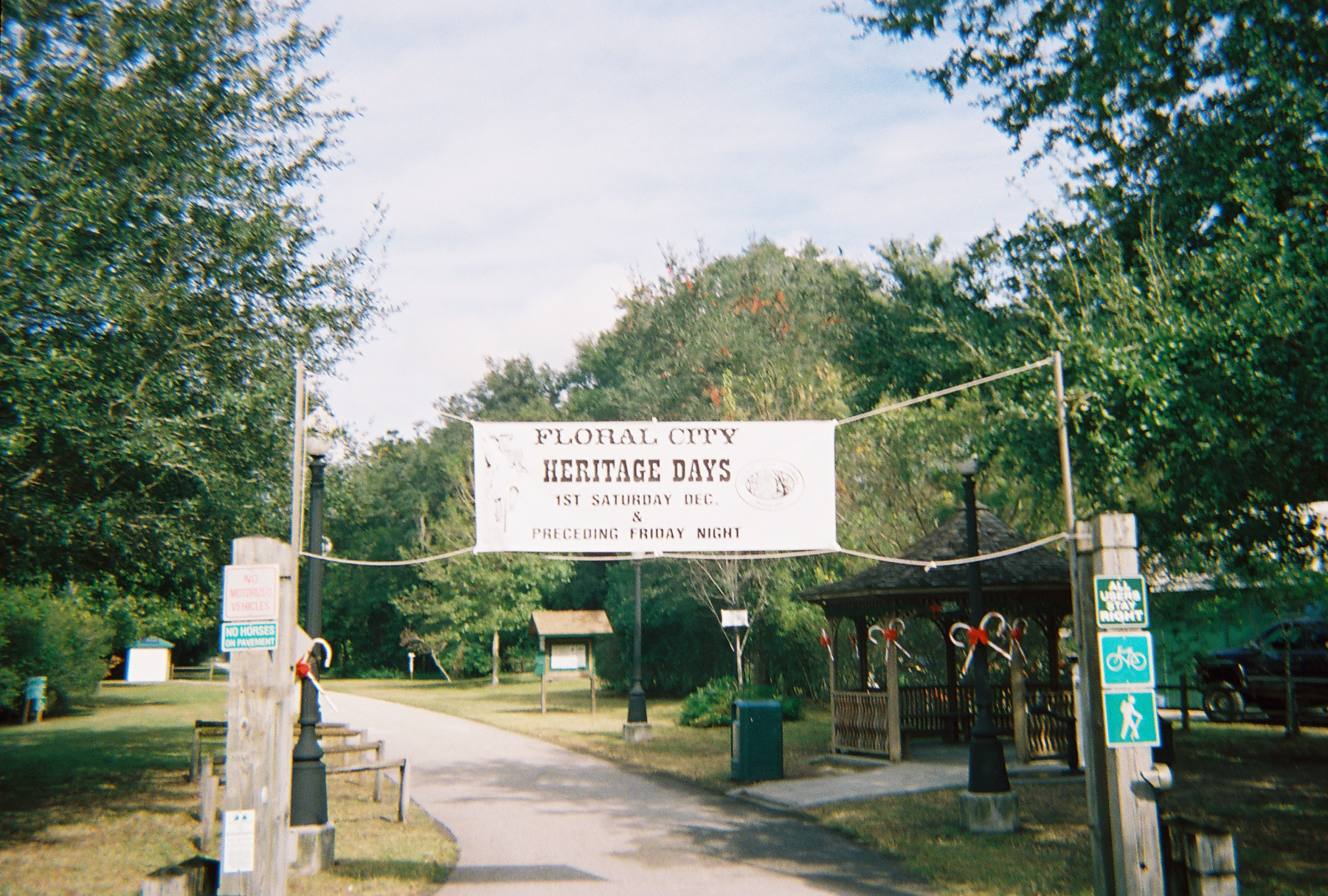
Floral City Heritage Days banner

Floral City Heritage Days is an annual celebration in Floral City, Florida, which was established in 1993. It takes place on the first weekend of December and celebrates the area's history. It includes phosphate mining, tours of historic homes, a fish fry, horse-drawn-carriage rides, luminarias, and caroling. It is hosted by the Floral City Heritage Council.

The event was not held in 2020.

== See also ==
- Floral City Heritage Museum
