= Florida Seafood Festival =

Annual two-day public event held in Apalachicola, Florida

Coordinates: 29.7237°N 84.9827°W

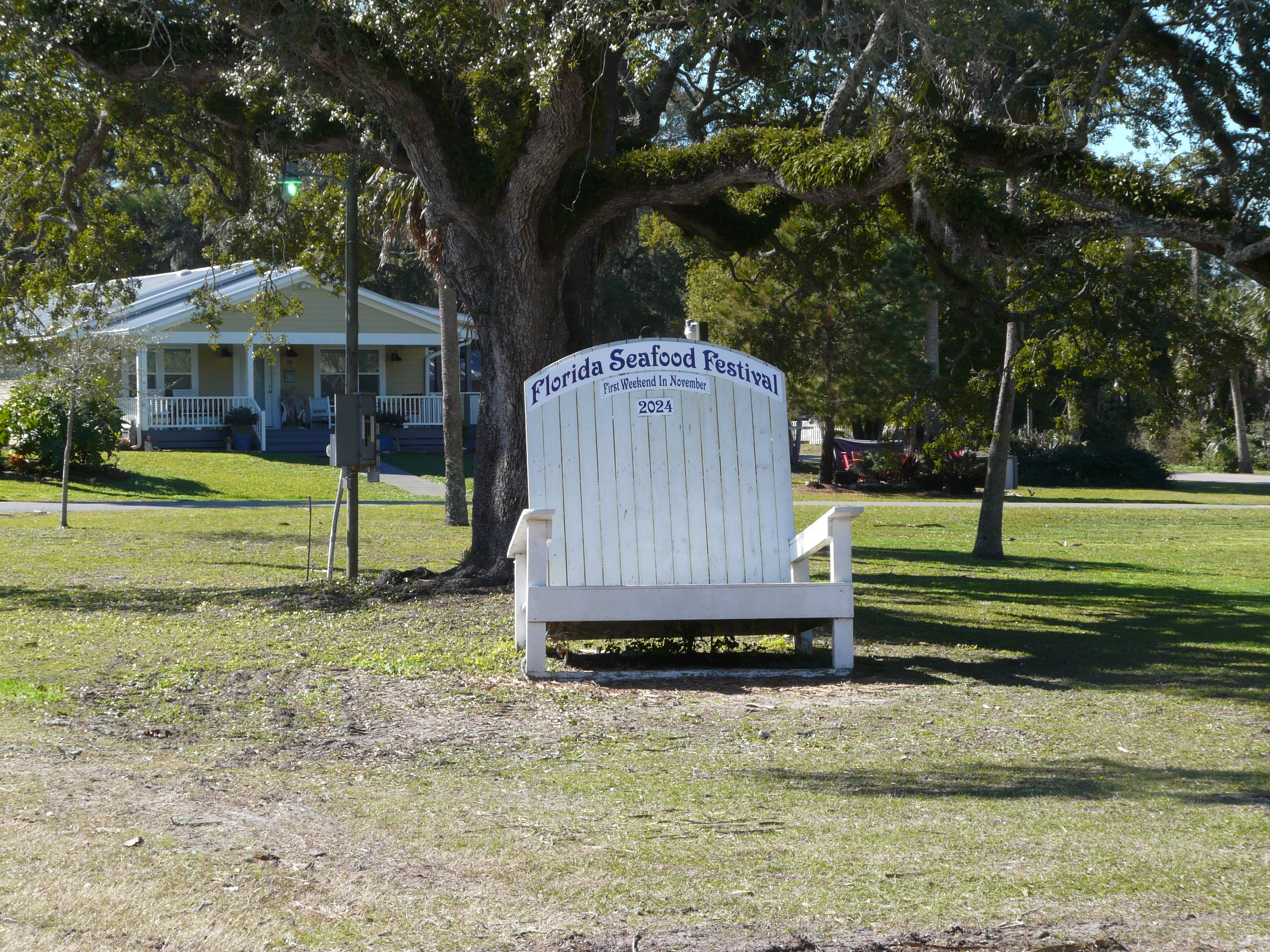
Chair advertising the festival

The Florida Seafood Festival is an annual two-day public event held in Apalachicola, Florida on the first weekend of November. The event is held in Battery Park, and around 25,000 people attend the festival every year. It is the oldest seafood festival in the state.

== History ==
In 1963, eight members of the Apalachicola Chamber of Commerce gathered to figure out a way to draw more visitors to the town. The idea of a seafood event was brought up, drawing inspiration from a seafood festival, "Harbor Days" which had been held in Apalachichola in 1915. The Florida Seafood Festival was established in 1964.

The 2010 Florida Seafood Festival Oyster Shucking Champion Mike Martin won the 2010 National Oyster Shucking Championship. In 2012 an estimated 30,000 people attended the event. The festival celebrated its 50th anniversary in 2013.

There was no Florida Seafood Festival in 2020 due to the COVID-19 pandemic. The event returned in 2021.

In 2022, Hurricane Ian caused the carnival ride provider to cancel.

== Description ==
Each year the festival features a parade (which has been held on the same route since its 1964 inception), carnival, blue crab races, oyster eating and shucking contests. The festival also offers a 5 kilometres (3.107 mi) road race, a country music concert, arts and craft booths, and plenty of fresh local seafood. The local seafood is prepared by local non-profit groups.

On the Friday night of the festival, the King Restyo Ball is held to crown the king and queen of the festival.

== See also ==
- Florida food festivals
