= Williston, Florida =

- City
- City of Williston
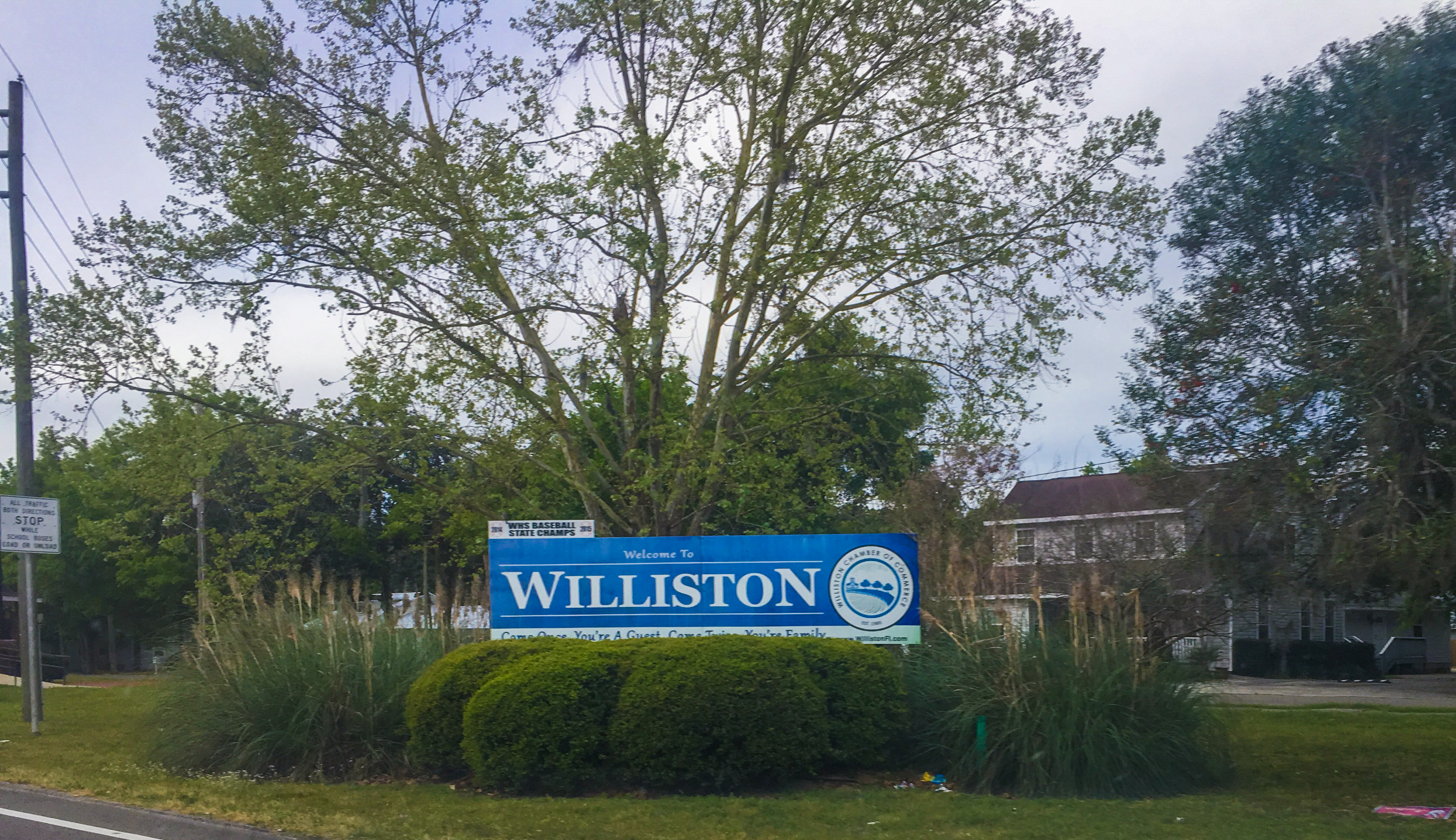
- Welcome sign for Williston, Florida, March 2019

- Seal
- Motto(s): "Gateway to the Nature Coast" "In God We Trust"
- Location in Levy County and the state of Florida
- Coordinates: 29°22′15″N 82°27′30″W
- Country: United States
- State: Florida
- County: Levy
- Settled: 1853
- Incorporated (town): 1897
- Reincorporated (city): June 2, 1929

Government
  - Type: Council-Manager
  - Mayor: Charles Goodman
  - Council President: Darfeness Hinds
  - Council Members: Michael Cox, Shanna Church, Meredith Martin, and Council Vice President Debra F. Jones
  - City Clerk: Latricia Wright
  - City Attorney: S. Scott Walker

Area
  - Total: 6.85 sq mi (17.73 km^{2})
  - Land: 6.83 sq mi (17.68 km^{2})
  - Water: 0.019 sq mi (0.05 km^{2})
- Elevation: 72 ft (22 m)

Population (2020)
  - Total: 2,976
  - Density: 435.9/sq mi (168.32/km^{2})
- Time zone: UTC-5 (Eastern (EST))
  - Summer (DST): UTC-4 (EDT)
- ZIP code: 32696
- Area code: 352
- FIPS code: 12-77825
- GNIS feature ID: 2405752
- Website: www.willistonfl.org

Williston is a city in Levy County, Florida, United States. It is part of the Nature Coast. As of the 2020 census, it had a population of 2,976, up from 2,768 at the 2010 census. It is part of the Gainesville, Florida Metropolitan Statistical Area.

== History ==
Williston was established in 1853 by J.M. Willis, who named it after himself. It was officially incorporated as the "Town of Williston" in 1897, but was reincorporated as the City of Williston on June 2, 1929.

On May 7, 2016, the first known fatal accident involving a self-driving vehicle occurred at the intersection of U.S. 27 and Northeast 140th Court in Williston. A 2015 Tesla Model S driven by 40 year old Joshua D. Brown of Canton, Ohio struck the side of a tractor-trailer turning left in front of Brown when the car's autonomous features failed to distinguish the white side of the truck against a bright sky. Brown was pronounced dead by Levy County Fire Rescue at the scene.

== Geography ==
Williston is located in the mid-central part of eastern Levy County.

=== Climate ===
The climate in the area is characterized by hot, humid summers and generally mild to cool winters. According to the Köppen Climate Classification system, Williston has a humid subtropical climate zone, abbreviated "Cfa" on climate maps.

== Demographics ==
Historical population
Census	Pop.	Note	%±
1900	184		—
1910	371		101.6%
1920	823		121.8%
1930	940		14.2%
1940	890		−5.3%
1950	1,323		48.7%
1960	1,582		19.6%
1970	1,939		22.6%
1980	2,240		15.5%
1990	2,179		−2.7%
2000	2,297		5.4%
2010	2,768		20.5%
2020	2,976		7.5%
U.S. Decennial Census

=== Racial and ethnic composition ===
Williston racial composition (Hispanics excluded from racial categories) (NH = Non-Hispanic)
Race	Pop 2010	Pop 2020	% 2010	% 2020
White (NH)	1,729	1,754	62.46%	58.94%
Black or African American (NH)	637	616	23.01%	20.70%
Native American or Alaska Native (NH)	3	0	0.11%	0.00%
Asian (NH)	44	62	1.59%	2.08%
Pacific Islander or Native Hawaiian (NH)	0	1	0.00%	0.03%
Some other race (NH)	7	8	0.25%	0.27%
Two or more races/Multiracial (NH)	35	104	1.26%	3.49%
Hispanic or Latino (any race)	313	431	11.31%	14.48%
Total	2,768	2,976		

=== 2020 census ===
As of the 2020 census, Williston had a population of 2,976. The median age was 39.6 years. 24.7% of residents were under the age of 18 and 23.3% of residents were 65 years of age or older. For every 100 females there were 85.4 males, and for every 100 females age 18 and over there were 79.7 males age 18 and over.

As of 2020, 0.0% of residents lived in urban areas, while 100.0% lived in rural areas.

In 2020, there were 1,151 households in Williston, of which 35.0% had children under the age of 18 living in them. Of all households, 40.7% were married-couple households, 16.3% were households with a male householder and no spouse or partner present, and 36.9% were households with a female householder and no spouse or partner present. About 27.2% of all households were made up of individuals and 15.5% had someone living alone who was 65 years of age or older.

In 2020, there were 1,230 housing units, of which 6.4% were vacant. The homeowner vacancy rate was 1.5% and the rental vacancy rate was 1.9%.

The 2020 American Community Survey estimated that 590 families resided in the city.

=== 2010 census ===
As of the 2010 United States census, there were 2,768 people, 1,184 households, and 763 families residing in the city.

=== 2000 census ===
As of the census of 2000, there were 2,297 people, 836 households, and 580 families residing in the city. The population density was 379.0 inhabitants per square mile (146.3/km^{2}). There were 915 housing units at an average density of 151.0 per square mile (58.3/km^{2}). The racial makeup of the city was 73.44% White, 22.81% African American, 0.78% Native American, 0.74% Asian, 0.44% Pacific Islander, 1.09% from other races, and 1.09% from two or more races. Hispanic or Latino of any race were 3.57% of the population.

In 2000, there were 836 households, out of which 31.8% had children under the age of 18 living with them, 42.9% were married couples living together, 22.0% had a female householder with no husband present, and 30.6% were non-families. 25.6% of all households were made up of individuals, and 12.7% had someone living alone who was 65 years of age or older. The average household size was 2.56 and the average family size was 3.03.

In 2000, in the city the population was spread out, with 26.2% under the age of 18, 8.6% from 18 to 24, 25.2% from 25 to 44, 20.3% from 45 to 64, and 19.8% who were 65 years of age or older. The median age was 38 years. For every 100 females, there were 86.1 males. For every 100 females age 18 and over, there were 76.9 males. In 2000, the median income for a household in the city was $25,795, and the median income for a family was $26,918. Males had a median income of $22,331 versus $20,634 for females. The per capita income for the city was $15,628. About 22.4% of families and 22.6% of the population were below the poverty line, including 28.1% of those under age 18 and 22.5% of those age 65 or over.

== Arts and culture ==
Williston hosts the Central Florida Harvest and Peanut Festival every October.

== Sports ==
=== Devil's Den and Blue Grotto ===
Williston is home to Devil's Den and Blue Grotto, popular diving spots and part of the extensive underground spring system present in the area.

=== Kentucky Derby ===
Williston is the birthplace of Foolish Pleasure, winner of the 1975 Kentucky Derby.

== Infrastructure ==
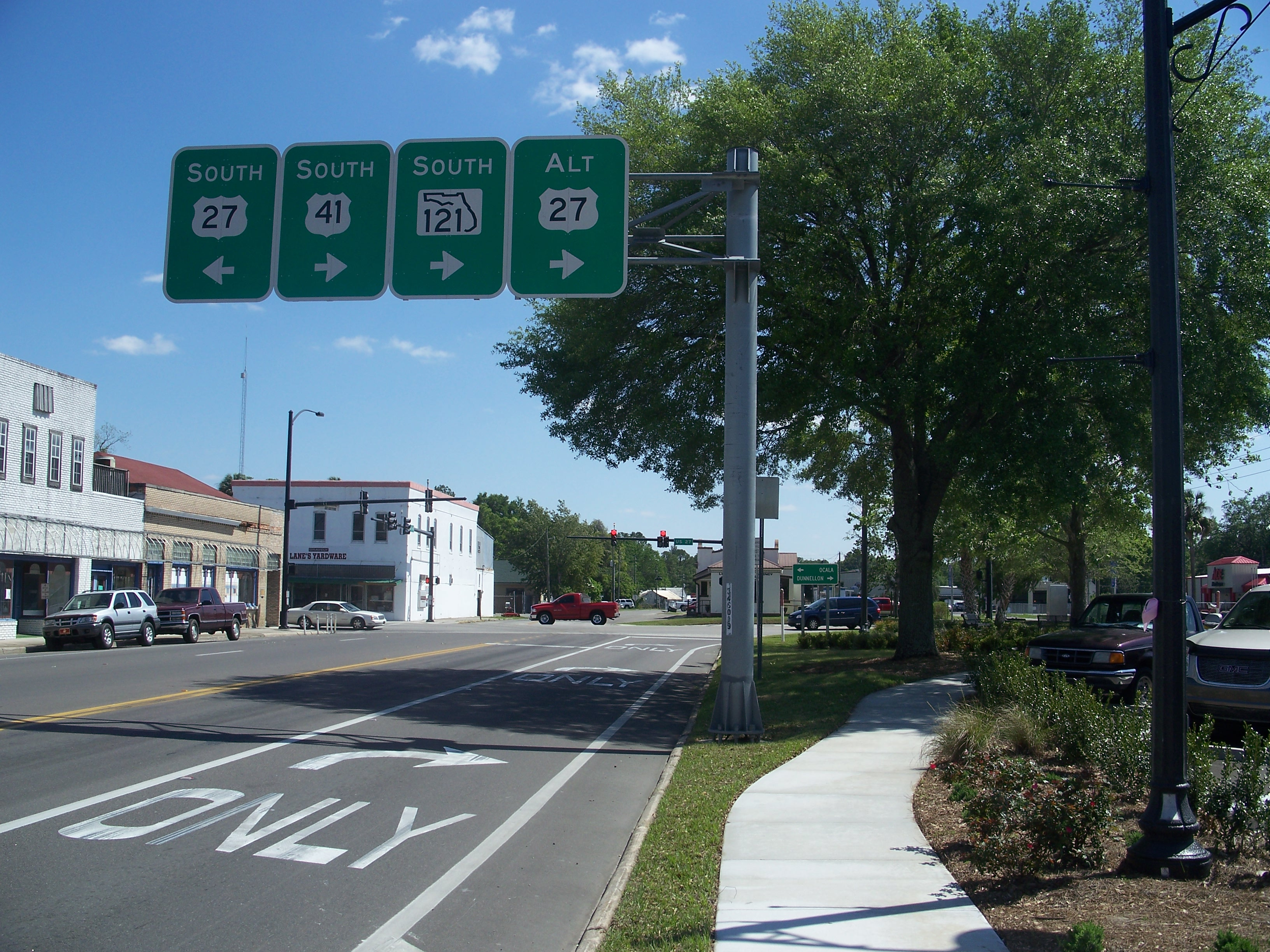
Before southbound US 27-41 and SR 121 splits in Williston, April 2009

=== Major roads ===
- US 27
- US 27 Alt.
- US 41
- SR 121

=== Railroads ===
Passenger rail service was available at the Williston Atlantic Coast Line Railroad Depot as well as the Seaboard Air Line Railroad depot. Since 2004, the depot is only served by Amtrak's Thruway Motorcoach service to Jacksonville and Lakeland.

Florida Northern Railroad's West Coast Subdivision provides freight rail service through Williston.

=== Aviation ===
The area includes Williston Municipal Airport (X60), a city-owned, public-use airport located two nautical miles (4 km) southwest of the central business district of Williston.

== Education ==
The School Board of Levy County operates these public schools:

- Williston High School (6–12)
- Williston Elementary School (3–5)
- Joyce Bullock Elementary School (PK–2)

=== Library ===
Levy County provides Williston with a local library branch. The Williston Public Library is located in the former, historic Perkins State Bank; one of Florida's oldest banks.
