= AURA Music and Arts Festival =

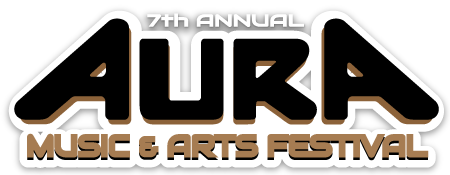
- Genre: Jam band, Funk, EDM, Rock, Jazz, Livetronica, Classic Rock, Tribute Bands
- Dates: March 3rd - 5th, 2016
- Locations: Spirit of the Suwannee Music Park, Live Oak, FL
- Years active: 2010 - Present
- Founders: Daryl Wolff
- Attendance: 5000+ (2015)
- Website: http://www.auramusicfestival.com

AURA Music and Arts Festival is an annual three-day, music-driven festival, featuring jam, funk, rock, jazz, and livetronica performances, as well as musical workshops, activities, and other programs. Produced by AURA Music Group, LLC, AURA Music and Arts Festival has produced six festivals since 2010. The festival now takes place at the Spirit of the Suwannee Music Park in Live Oak, FL.

== History ==
AURA Music and Arts Festival was established in 2010 by Florida-based AURA Music Group, LLC. This business was started by Daryl Wolff (Executive Producer), Carlos "CJ" Rodrigues (Operations), Craig Heneveld (Operations) and Bianca Garza (Vending Coordinator). Wolff, Rodrigues and Heneveld had a history of producing shows in Florida together before coming together to form the first annual festival. In 2011, Cameron Troy Ferguson (Operations Director) came on board the already existing team. Currently, AURA Music Group, LLC is owned and managed by Wolff and Ferguson.

AURA started in January 2010 in Brooksville, FL at the Sertoma Youth Ranch. With a small expected attendance, the staff was overly surprised when almost 1000 patrons showed up for the inaugural event. It quickly became apparent that the venue could not hold the growth of the show, so Wolff started a search for larger properties, and stumbled upon the Forever Florida property in St. Cloud, FL. With over 4000 acres, the property was happy to welcome the festival and its growth (Wolff found the property using Google Earth).

The festival was produced for its 2nd and 3rd years in St. Cloud, but in 4th year was moved to its current home, the Spirit of the Suwannee Music Park.

== Location History ==
- AURA 2010: Sertoma Youth Ranch, Brooksville, FL
- AURA 2011: Forever Florida, St. Cloud, FL
- AURA 2012: Forever Florida, St. Cloud, FL
- AURA 2013: Spirit of the Suwannee Music Park, Live Oak, FL
- AURA 2014: Spirit of the Suwannee Music Park, Live Oak, FL
- AURA 2015: Spirit of the Suwannee Music Park, Live Oak, FL
- AURA 2016: Spirit of the Suwannee Music Park, Live Oak, FL

== Past Lineups ==
- AURA 2010: Brother Bean, The Malah, Papadosio, Soular System, Greenhouse Lounge, Cope, Aquaphonics, Diocious, Lingo, Before Trees, Emily Carroll, Bill Talley, DJ Craig Heneveld, DJ Lexxx, Aquarium, Labyrinth, Min//Max
- AURA 2011: Papadosio, The Heavy Pets, Zoogma, The Malah, Green Hit, Cope, The Burnin Smyrnans, Greenhouse Lounge, Crazy Fingers, Gravity A, Sci Fi, Cypress, Aquaphonics, EP3, The Resolvers, Freq, Damn Right!, Diocious, FUSIK, Lingo, SOSOS, Shak Nasti, Noise Org, Third Nature, Under The Porch, Savi Fernandez Band, Saltwater Grass, Honey Henny Lime, Chroma, New Gravity, Robot Ears, Legacy, Lather Up!, Fat Mannequin, The Rooze, Nick Noyes, KLOB, DJ Craig Heneveld, Aquarium, Labyrinth, Tom Foolery, DJ Lexxx, DJ Travis Lindsey, NALA, Arturo, Steve Graham, Min//Max, MEEEKO, T8rtot, Arturo Alexander, Andy Mara, Butch Johnson, D Roller, DJ Terence, DJ Scott, Rolls Royce, Pillform, C3 of EP3, African Lung Fish, Sean Fee
- AURA 2012: Papadosio, Brothers Past, The Heavy Pets, Zoogma, Dr Fameus, Biodiesel, Kung Fu, The Malah, Dopapod, Cope, DJ Craig Heneveld, Damn Right!, The Werks, Brother Bean, Aquaphonics, Ultraviolet Hippopotamus, Former Champions, Bang Bang!, The Mantras, Flt Rsk, FUSIK, Sonic Spank, El Groundscoro, Ketchy Shuby, J2K, Newton Crosby, Saltwater Grass, Nick Noyes, EP3, The Resolvers, Third Nature, Sounduo, The Fritz, Green Sunshine, Artofficial, Elephantgun, The Short Straw Pickers, SOSOS, Marc Paper Scissor, The Funky Nuggets, Psychedelphia, Spontaneous Underground, The Merry Franksterz
- AURA 2013: Papadosio, Conspirator, Perpetual Groove, Break Science, RAQ, The Heavy Pets, Dopapod, Kung Fu, Nigel Hall, The Lee Boys, Greenhouse Lounge, Dr Fameus, Jeff Bujak, Arpetrio, Sir Charles, Yo Mama's Big Fat Booty Band, UDNTPRTY, Stokeswood, Consider The Source, Former Champions, Brock Butler, Earthcry, Lingo, Newton Crosby, The Main Squeeze, The McLovins, DJ Tony D, Monozygotik, My Boy Elroy, Vlad The Inhaler, DJ Scotty Solomon, Dubble James, Beat Thief Inc., Michael Garfield
- AURA 2014: Lotus, Papadosio, Conspirator, Zoogma, The Werks, The Revivalists, Particle, The Heavy Pets, Future Rock, Marco Benevento, Mike Dillon Band, Kung Fu, Dopapod, Superhuman Happiness, Cope, Earphunk, Juno What?!, Twiddle, Jimkata, Stokeswood, Start Making Sense, The Resolvers, Lucky Costello, Catfish Alliance, Lather Up!, Pigeons Playing Ping Pong, Fat Mannequin, Displace, Spontaneous Underground, Polyester Pimpstrap
- AURA 2015: The Disco Biscuits, moe., Papadosio, Break Science (Live Band), The Motet, Kung Fu, Dopapod, The Heavy Pets, RAQ, Jimkata, Consider The Source, TAUK, The Main Squeeze, American Babies, The Mike Dillon Band, Pigeons Playing Ping Pong, The Mantras, The Fritz, McLovins, Ghost Owl, Turbo Suit, Brother Bean, FUSIK, Ketchy Shuby, Uproot Hootenanny, Funkin Grateful, Lather Up! Fat Mannequin, Stinky Pockets, Lucky Costello, JUKE, Vlad The Inhaler, Weazildust, ZwangBang w/ DJ Chewie, Beat Thief Inc., Bedside, Bells & Robes, DJ Craig Heneveld, DJ Scotty Solomon, Felix Fusik, JayJoHeRo, Matthew Connor, Tony D, The Shady Horns
- Aura 2016: The Disco Biscuits, Thievery Corporation, Snarky Puppy, ALO, theNEWDEAL, The Werks, The Heavy Pets Tribute to the 80's, Turkuaz, Particle, The Main Squeeze, Tom Hamilton's American Babies, Mike Dillion Band, Pink Talking Fish, Bright Light Social Hour, Aqueous, Backup Planet, Bedside, Ben Sparaco Band, Broccoli Samurai, CBDB, Crazy Fingers, Dank, Displace, Fat Mannequin, The Fritz, Fusik, Garrin Benfield, Greenhouse Lounge, Holly Bowling, Jimkata, Lather Up! Lucky Costello, Nunchuck, Pigeons Playing Ping Pong, The Resolvers, Roar!, Third Nature

== Tribute Sets & Collaborations ==
- In 2013, Kung Fu collaborated with soul singer Nigel Hall to present a tribute set of Stevie Wonder's music.
- In 2014, Stokeswood collaborated with multiple guests to present a tribute set of Hall & Oates music.
- In 2015, The Main Squeeze collaborated with Ryan Zoidis and Eric Bloom of Lettuce to present a tribute set of Michael Jackson's music.
