= Central Florida Harvest and Peanut Festival =

Central Florida Peanut Festival is a cultural and historical event in Florida celebrating the peanut. Established in 1989, it's held annually in October in Williston, Florida. 2020 was to be in its 32nd year, but the COVID-19 pandemic caused it to be deferred to 2021.
