= Orange Drive Miami Beach Music Festival =

Orange Drive Miami Beach Music Festival is a three-day outdoor music festival that occurs on New Year's weekend in South Beach, on Ocean Drive between 5th-14th streets. A state of the art amphitheater is constructed on the beach. Revelers party on the sand and under the stars in average temperatures of 70 degrees during that time period. Orange Drive is positioned to be the biggest and coolest New Year's celebration on the planet!

This festival is on hiatus in 2020.

== Creation ==
Orange Drive Miami Beach Music Festival was developed in 2010 by Union Square Agency in cooperation with the Orange Bowl Committee and the City of Miami Beach. Originally known as the Orange Drive South Beach Festival, the three-day festival kicked off with City of Miami Beach Vice Mayor Michael Gongora renaming Ocean Drive, Orange Drive on December 30, 2010. Orange Drive 2010-2011 was attended by thousands of people from well over 36 countries. The 2011-2012 festival is expected to be bigger and better with more A-list talent, media components and sponsored activations.

== 2011-2012 ==
The Orange Drive Miami Beach Music Festival 2011-2012 will be held December 30, 31, January 1. The amphitheater will hold up to 30,000 party goers each night.

The talent for the 2011-2012 includes high-profile artists such as Grammy-winner Cee Lo Green, Jason Derulo, Cobra Starship, Gym Class Heroes, 3-time Grammy-winner Ne-Yo, Pete Wentz (former member of American band Fall Out Boy) and his band The Black Cards, Grammy-award winner Jermaine Dupri, DJ Samantha Ronson, DJ Irie and 4-time Grammy-award winners Boyz II Men.

In addition to an increase in A-List performers in 2011-2012, Orange Drive Miami Beach Music Festival will host its first national TV show, "Jam On the Sand". The New Year's Eve show will be hosted by Daymond John, founder of FUBU and star of Shark Tank, and will focus on the entertainment, artists, festivities as well as the "Orange Ball Drop" that is set to become a tradition to celebrate the New Year.

2011-2012 festival passes for Orange Drive Miami Beach Music Festival have officially gone up for sale on Ticketmaster.com. General admission 3-day passes are priced at $145 while VIP 3-day passes are priced at $195.

== 2010-2011 ==
The inaugural Orange Drive Miami Beach Music Festival took place on December 31, 2010 to January 2, 2011. Some of the talent from the 2010-2011 included Leona Lewis, Natasha Bedingfield, DJ Irie, DJ Nino, DJ Vertigo, Adam Carolla, Cuban-American singer Albita, legendary salsa king Gilberto Santa Rosa and salsa duo Hansel y Raul.
