= Floral City, Florida =

Census-designated place in Florida, US

Floral City
- Census-designated place
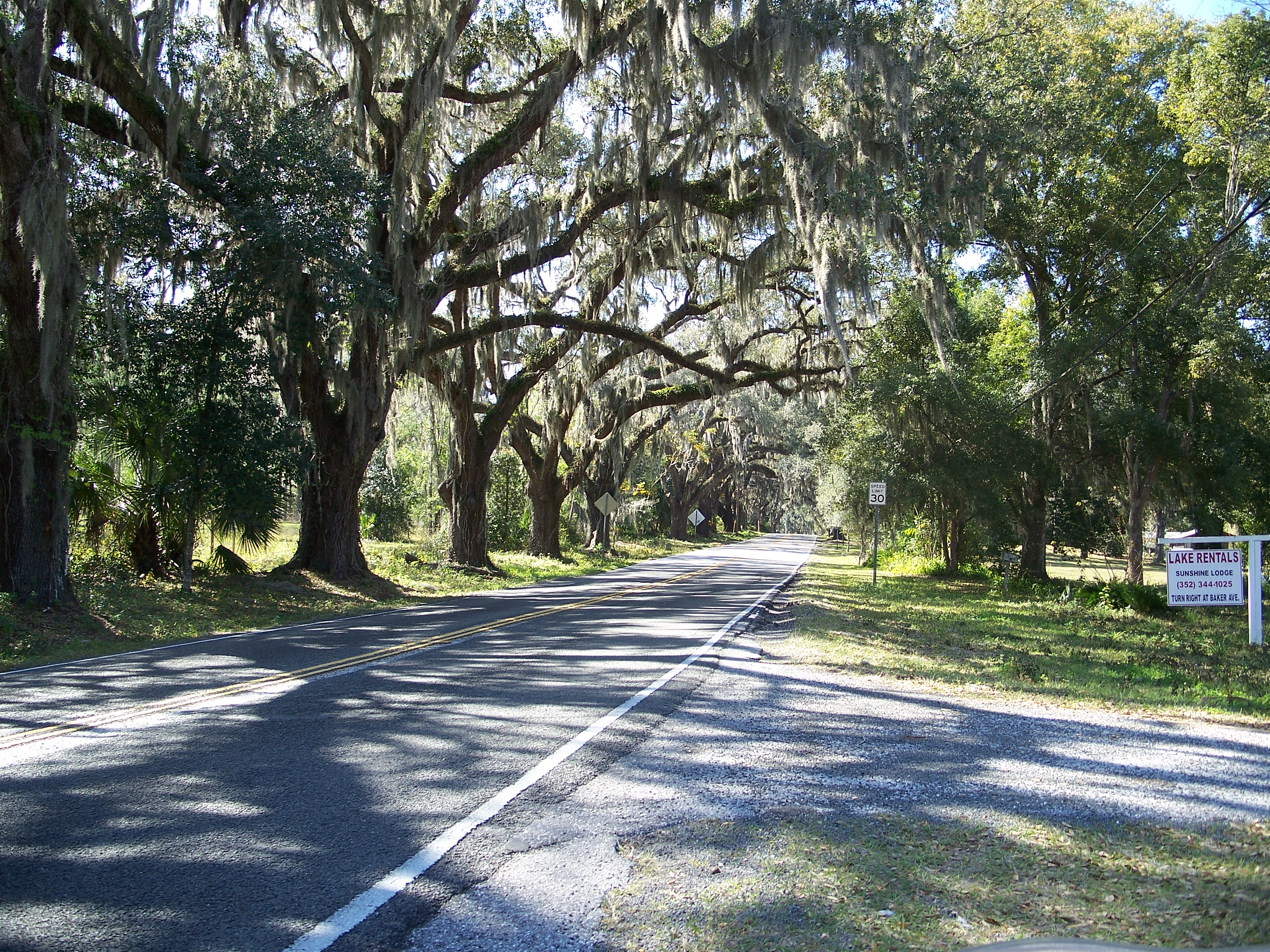
- Picturesque East Orange Avenue in Floral City was once part of SR 48.

- Location in Citrus County and the state of Florida
- Coordinates: 28°44′15″N 82°17′58″W
- Country: United States
- State: Florida
- County: Citrus

Area
  - Total: 25.01 sq mi (64.77 km^{2})
  - Land: 23.31 sq mi (60.38 km^{2})
  - Water: 1.69 sq mi (4.39 km^{2})
- Elevation: 59 ft (18 m)

Population (2020)
  - Total: 5,261
  - Density: 225.7/sq mi (87.13/km^{2})
- Time zone: UTC-5 (Eastern (EST))
  - Summer (DST): UTC-4 (EDT)
- ZIP code: 34436
- Area code: 352
- FIPS code: 12-22775
- GNIS feature ID: 2402488
- Website: www.city-data.com/picfilesv/picv13773.php

Floral City is a census-designated place (CDP) in Citrus County, Florida, United States. The population was 5,261 at the 2020 census, up from 5,217 at the 2010 census. It is part of the Homosassa Springs, Florida Metropolitan Statistical Area. The community is home to the Floral City Heritage Hall Museum and hosts the Floral City Heritage Days the first weekend in December. The area has a history of phosphate mining and includes historic homes.

== Geography ==
Floral City is located in southeastern Citrus County. It is bordered to the south by Hernando County. U.S. Route 41 runs through the community, leading north 6 miles (10 km) to Inverness, the Citrus County seat, and south 15 miles (24 km) to Brooksville.

According to the United States Census Bureau, the CDP has a total area of 24.9 square miles (64.5 km^{2}), of which 23.3 square miles (60.4 km^{2}) is land and 1.6 square miles (4.1 km^{2}), or 6.37%, is water. Floral City is located at the south end of Tsala Apopka Lake, a chain of lakes and wetlands that are part of the Withlacoochee River basin. The town is located at the 23 mile marker (middle) of the Withlacoochee State Trail, a linear state park that follows an old railroad line. It is currently the longest paved trail in Florida at 46 miles (74 km).

== History ==
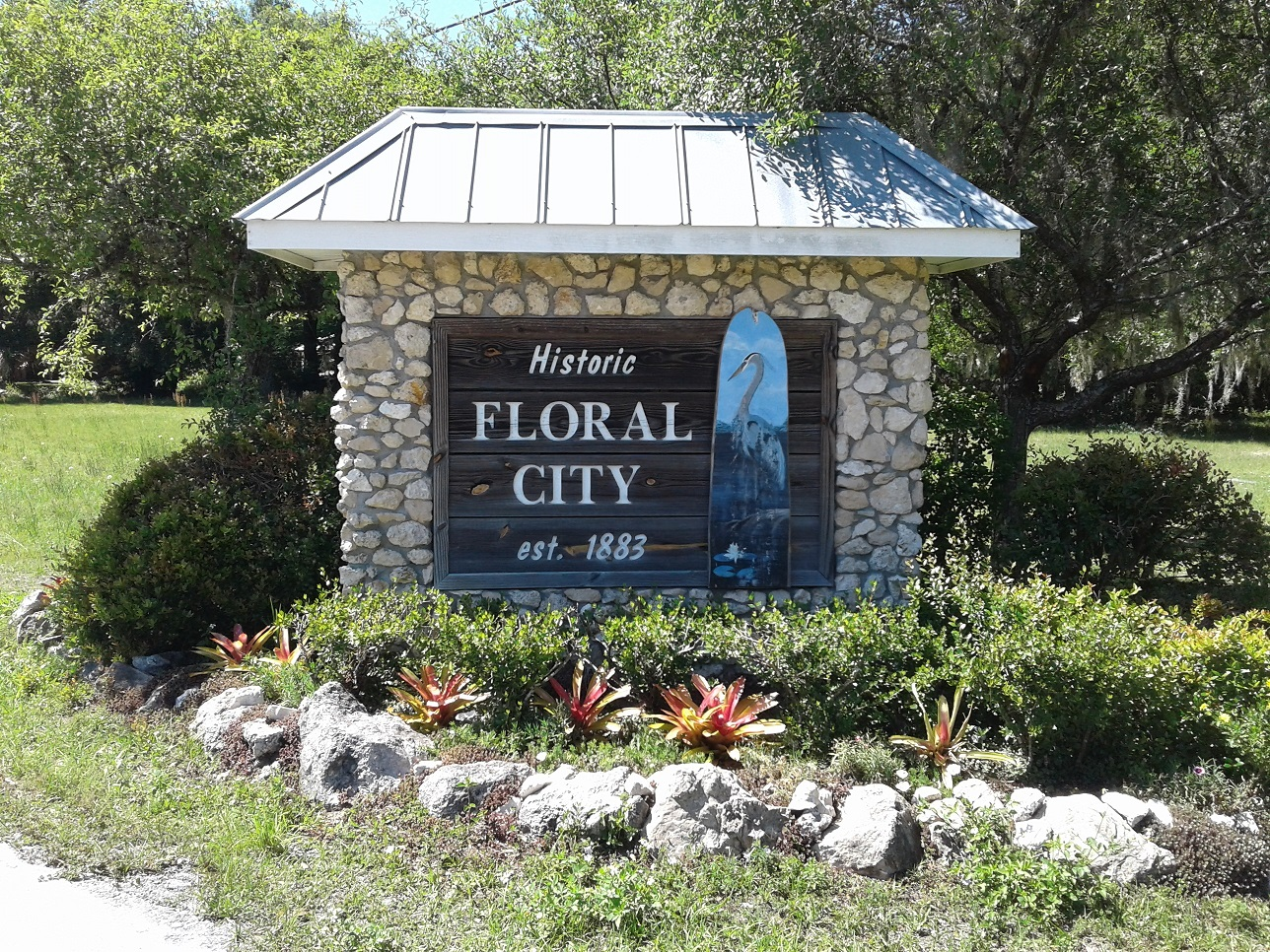
Rock wall in Floral City, Florida

Floral City was laid out and surveyed in 1883 by the surveyor W.H. Havron and then-Senator Austin S. Mann. The land was owned by James Baker, son-in-law of ex-Confederate soldier John Paul Formy-Duval, an early area settler and landowner. The village was at one time larger than Miami, due to the phosphate mining industry located in Citrus County. Around the time of World War I, the mining industry shut down in Floral City. After the war, mining was moved south to the Bartow area east of Tampa.

The community is said to be a slice of "Old Florida" that remains relatively intact. The town was named Floral City for its abundance of wild flowers, which are still plentiful today.

== Demographics ==
Historical population
Census	Pop.	Note	%±
1990	2,609		—
2000	4,989		91.2%
2010	5,217		4.6%
2020	5,261		0.8%
U.S. Decennial Census

=== 2020 census ===
As of the 2020 census, Floral City had a population of 5,261. The median age was 58.0 years. 13.6% of residents were under the age of 18 and 36.5% of residents were 65 years of age or older. For every 100 females there were 92.6 males, and for every 100 females age 18 and over there were 93.0 males age 18 and over.

0.0% of residents lived in urban areas, while 100.0% lived in rural areas.

There were 2,446 households in Floral City, of which 15.8% had children under the age of 18 living in them. Of all households, 50.2% were married-couple households, 17.6% were households with a male householder and no spouse or partner present, and 25.4% were households with a female householder and no spouse or partner present. About 31.1% of all households were made up of individuals and 19.2% had someone living alone who was 65 years of age or older.

There were 2,912 housing units, of which 16.0% were vacant. The homeowner vacancy rate was 2.1% and the rental vacancy rate was 7.9%.

Racial composition as of the 2020 census
Race	Number	Percent
White	4,783	90.9%
Black or African American	56	1.1%
American Indian and Alaska Native	14	0.3%
Asian	19	0.4%
Native Hawaiian and Other Pacific Islander	5	0.1%
Some other race	52	1.0%
Two or more races	332	6.3%
Hispanic or Latino (of any race)	266	5.1%

=== 2000 census ===
As of the census of 2000, there were 4,989 people, 2,180 households, and 1,473 families residing in the CDP. The population density was 213.9 inhabitants per square mile (82.6/km^{2}). There were 2,664 housing units at an average density of 114.2 per square mile (44.1/km^{2}). The racial makeup of the CDP was 96% White, 1.6% African American, 0.36% Native American, 0.14% Asian, 0.04% Pacific Islander, 0.38% from other races, and 1.14% from two or more races. Hispanic or Latino of any race were 2.6% of the population.

There were 2,180 households, out of which 20.4% had children under the age of 18 living with them, 56.7% were married couples living together, 7.1% had a female householder with no husband present, and 32.4% were non-families. 27.8% of all households were made up of individuals, and 16.7% had someone living alone who was 65 years of age or older. The average household size was 2.25 and the average family size was 2.69.

In the CDP, the population was spread out, with 20.3% under the age of 18, 4.5% from 18 to 24, 20.5% from 25 to 44, 25.4% from 45 to 64, and 29.2% who were 65 years of age or older. The median age was 49 years. For every 100 females, there were 92.3 males. For every 100 females age 18 and over, there were 91.6 males.

The median income for a household in the CDP was $28,180, and the median income for a family was $33,404. Males had a median income of $26,972 versus $22,348 for females. The per capita income for the CDP was $14,793. About 10.7% of families and 15.1% of the population were below the poverty line, including 22.6% of those under age 18 and 7.5% of those age 65 or over.

== Education ==
The CDP is served by Citrus County Schools. Zoned schools include Floral City Elementary School, Inverness Middle School, and Citrus High School.

The Floral City Library of Citrus Libraries is in Floral City.
