= Miami Nice Jazz Festival =

Jazz festival in Miami, Florida

Coordinates: 25°46′31″N 80°12′32″W

The Miami Nice Jazz Festival is a jazz festival in Miami, Florida. It is a continuation of the festival which started in 1948 in Nice, France, which took place in the Opéra de Nice. This venue was one of the early theaters to broadcast over the radio. The Nice Jazz festival received its popularity from musicians such as Louis Armstrong.

The festival was next held 23 years later in 1971 with Ella Fitzgerald, Helen Humes, Pharoah Sanders, T-Bone Walker, Stéphane Grappelli, Django Reinhardt, Herbie Hancock, Oscar Peterson, Roy Eldridge, John Lewis, Al Grey, Percy Heath, Connie Key, Dizzy Gillespie, NHØP, Daniel Humair, Sonny Stitt, Cannonball Adderley, the Modern Jazz Quartet, Charlie Mingus, Max Roach, and Miles Davis. Since 1971, it has been an annual event.

In 1986, Miami and Nice came together as sister cities.[citation needed] Because of this relation, in the summer of 2011 Philippe Pautesta-Herder had the idea to export this musical event to Miami.

Since the reincarnated festival in 1971, it has been a recurring event each year. Since 2011, the festival has been run by Christian Estrosi, the mayor of Nice. More than 30,000 visitors attended in 2011.
