= List of festivals in Louisiana =

Festivals of Louisiana
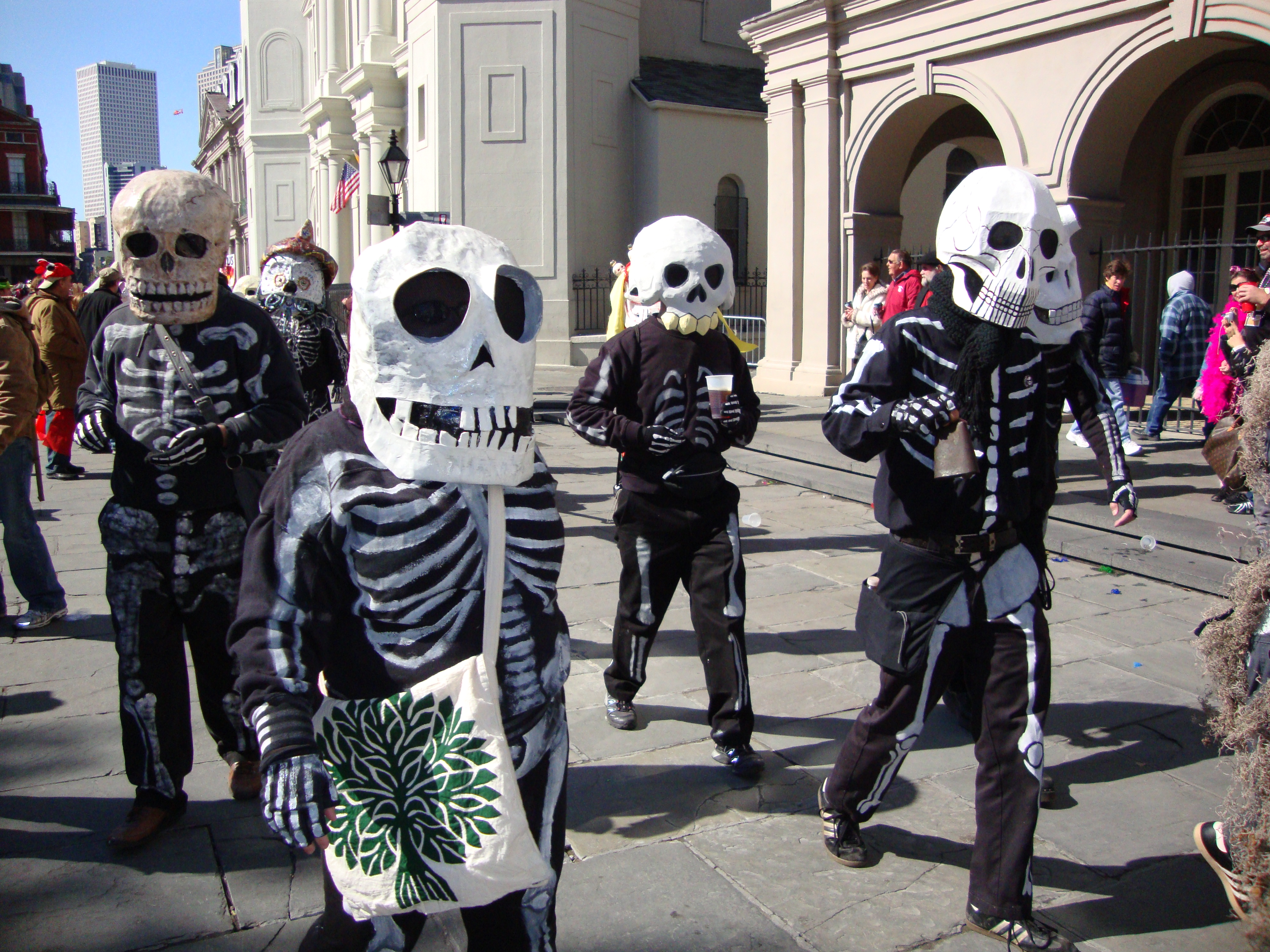

Unique types
- Louisiana Mardi Gras; New Orleans Mardi Gras

Related topics
- Festivals of the United States; lists of festivals by state or region (American Samoa; Florida; Guam; Georgia; Hawaii; Michigan; New Jersey; Pennsylvania; Puerto Rico; United States Virgin Islands; Virginia); culture of Louisiana; tourism in Louisiana

This is a list of festivals in Louisiana, grouped by theme. This is also a list of Louisiana's cultural events.

== Festivals by type ==
=== Arts and crafts festivals ===
- Hot air balloon festival championship - Baton Rouge
- Red River Revel - Shreveport
- Shakespeare Festival - New Orleans
- Tennessee Williams/New Orleans Literary Festival - New Orleans
- Wooden Boat Festival - Madison Ville - Baton Rouge

=== Film and media festivals ===
- Red Stick International Animation Festival - Baton Rouge

=== Food, harvest and wild game festivals ===
- La Fête du Monde (Lockport Food Festival)
- La Fete Des Vieux Temps - Raceland
- Alligator Festival - Luling
- Andouille Festival - LaPlace
- Breaux Bridge Crawfish Festival - Breaux Bridge
- Catfish Festival - Des Allemands
- The Cochon de Lait - Mansura
- Oyster Festival - Amite
- International Rice Festival - Crowley
- Louisiana Fur and Wildlife Festival - Cameron
- Louisiana Peach Festival - Ruston
- Strawberry Festival - Pontchatoula
- Washington Parish Watermelon Festival - Franklinton
- Yambilee Festival - Opelousas
- Boudin Festival - Scott
- Sugar Cane Festival - New Iberia
- Frog Festival - Rayne
- Jambalaya Festival - Gonzales

=== Heritage and folk festivals ===
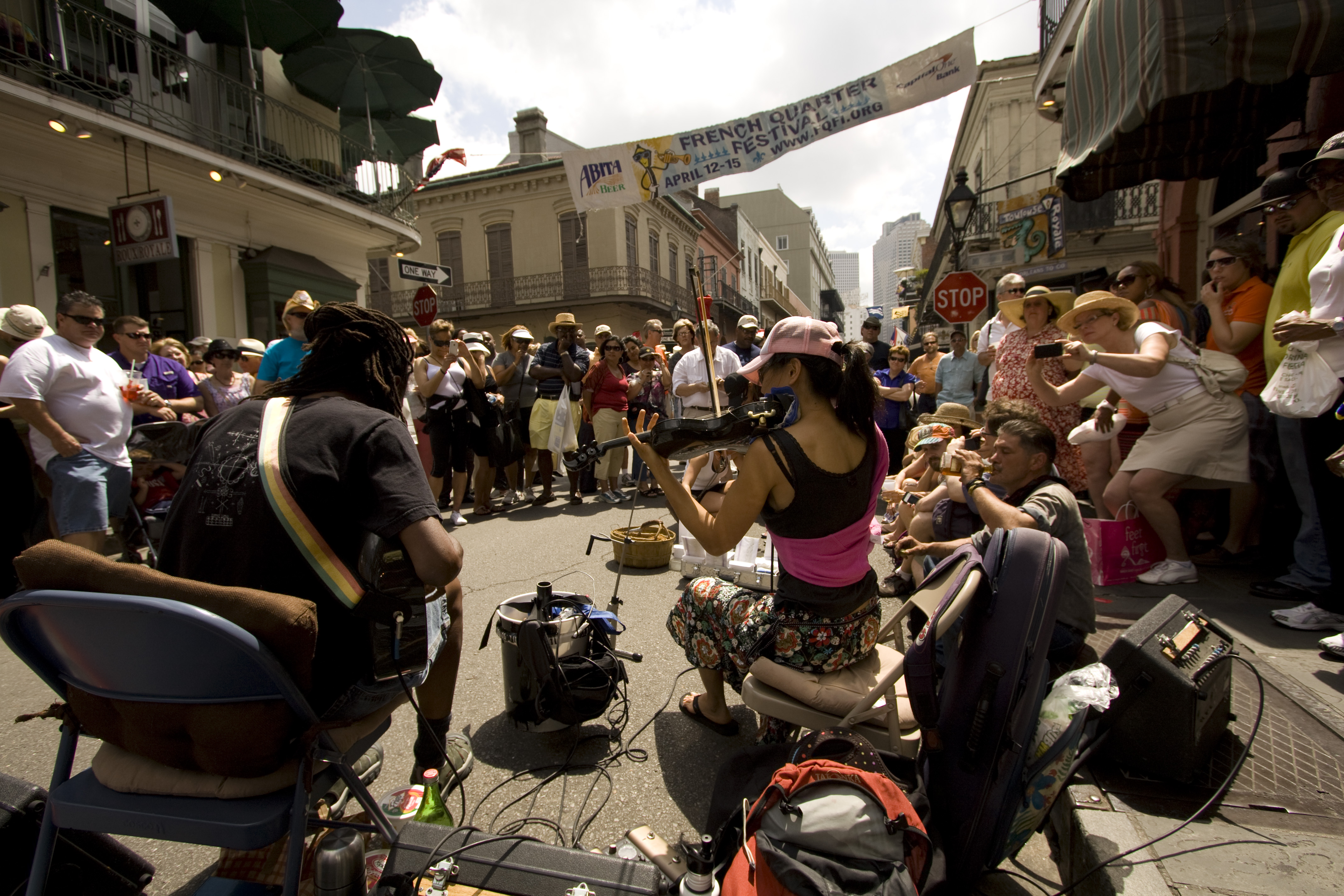
- French Quarter Street performers
  *Festivals Acadiens - Lafayette
- Italian Festival - Tickfaw
- Louisiana Renaissance Festival - Hammond
- Contraband Days - Lake Charles
- Adai Caddo Powwow - Robeline, Louisiana

=== Holiday festivals ===
- Courir de Mardi Gras - Acadiana
- Día de Muertos - New Orleans
- Festival of the Bonfires - Reserve, Garyville, Gramercy, and Lutcher Louisiana
- Fèt Gede New Orleans
- Holiday Trail of Lights - North Louisiana
- Natchitoches Christmas Festival - Natchitoches
- New Orleans Mardi Gras - New Orleans

=== Garden and botanical festivals ===
- Pollination Celebration - Tangipahoa Parish
- Herb and Garden Festival - Sunset
- Louisiana Forest Festival - Winnfield
- Daylily Festival - Abbeville

=== Music festivals ===
- Baton Rouge Blues Festival - Baton Rouge
- Bayou Country Superfest - New Orleans
- DeltaFest - Monroe
- Essence Music Festival - New Orleans
- Festival International - Lafayette
- French Quarter Festival - New Orleans
- Highland Jazz & Blues Festival - Shreveport, New Orleans
- New Orleans Burlesque Festival - New Orleans
- New Orleans Jazz & Heritage Festival - New Orleans
- Strawberry Jam'n Toast To The Arts Festival - Ponchatoula
- Voodoo Experience - New Orleans

== Gallery ==
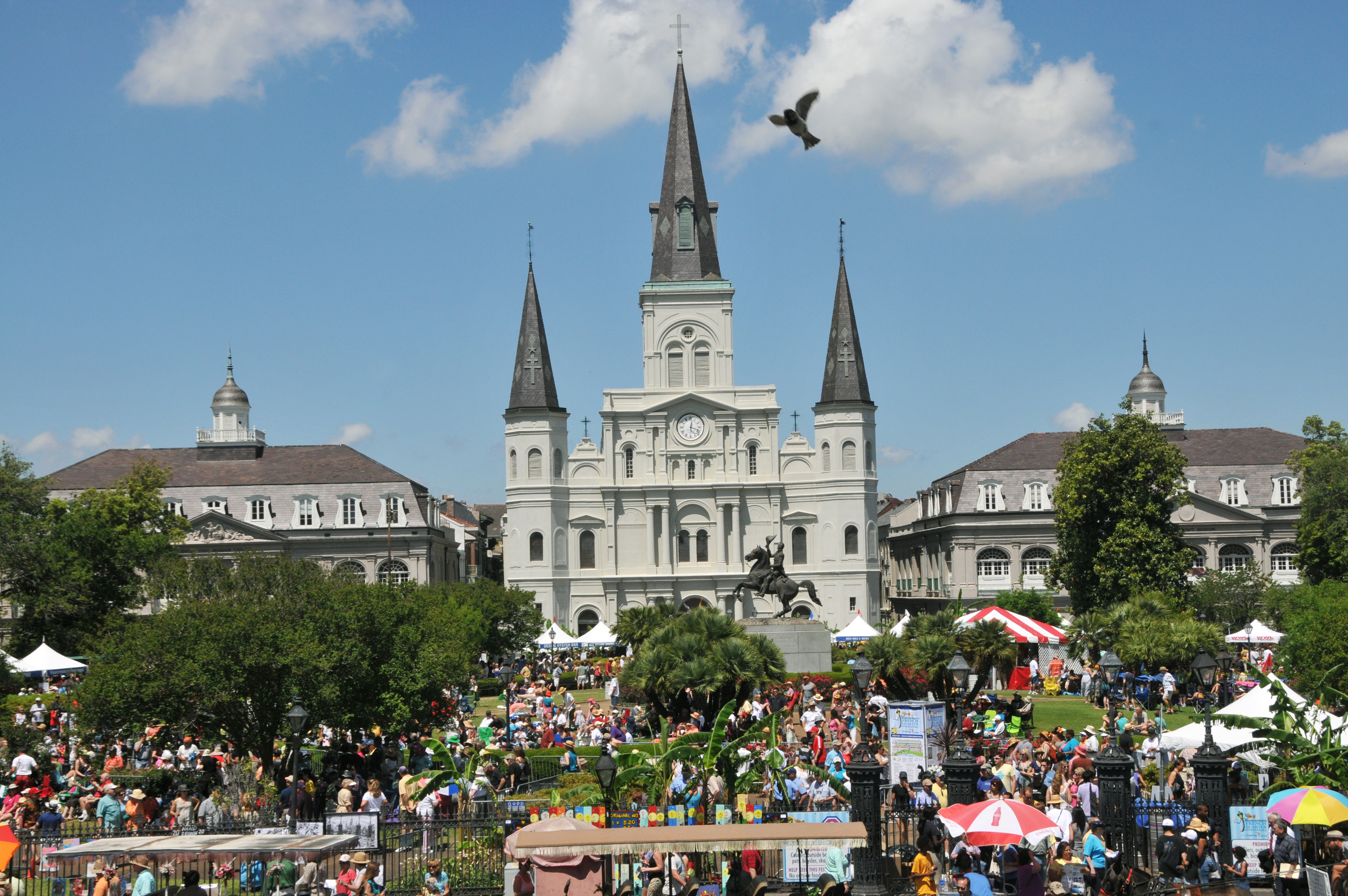
Jackson Square in the French Quarter Fest

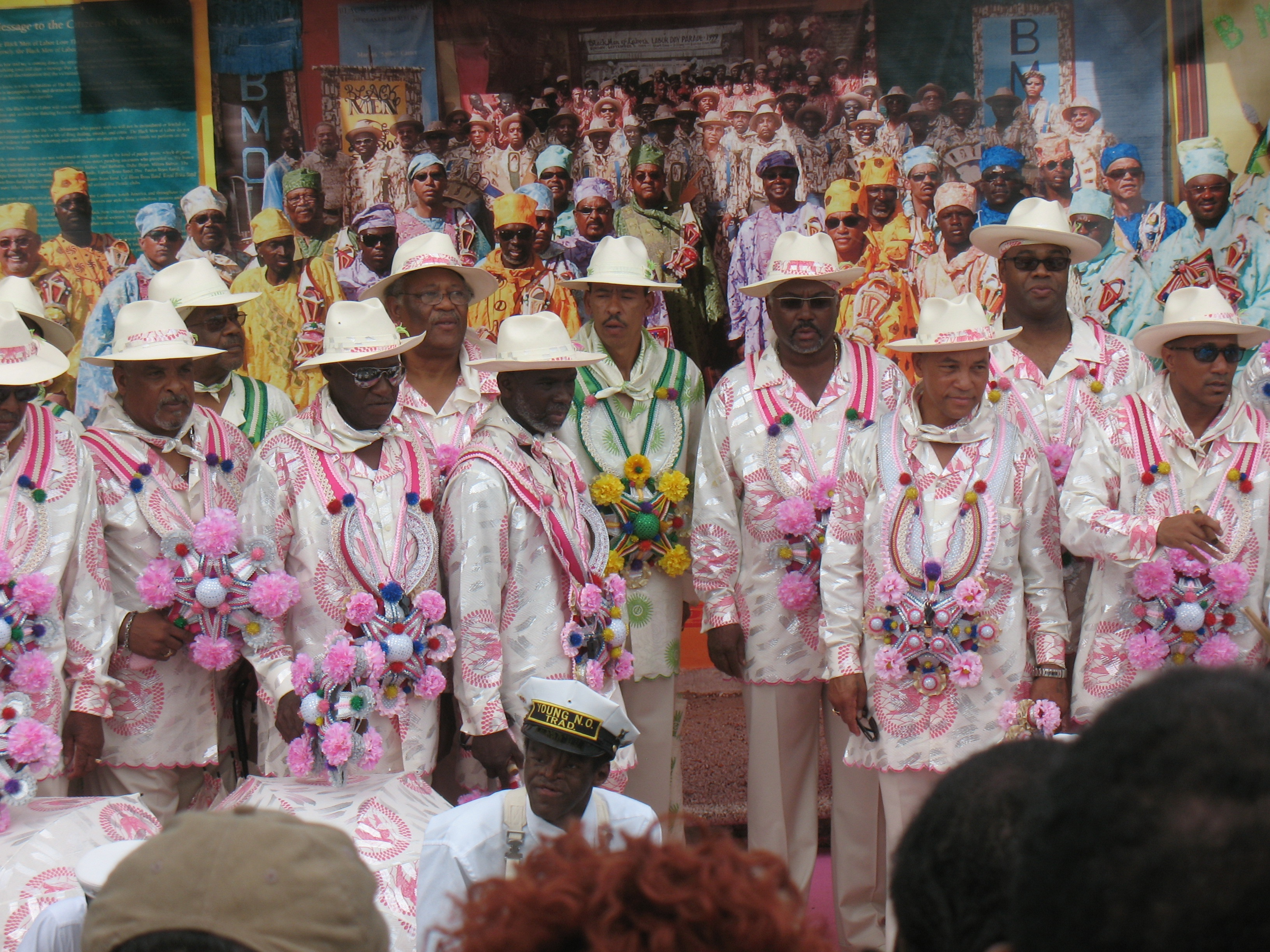
Black Men of Labor Parade 2009

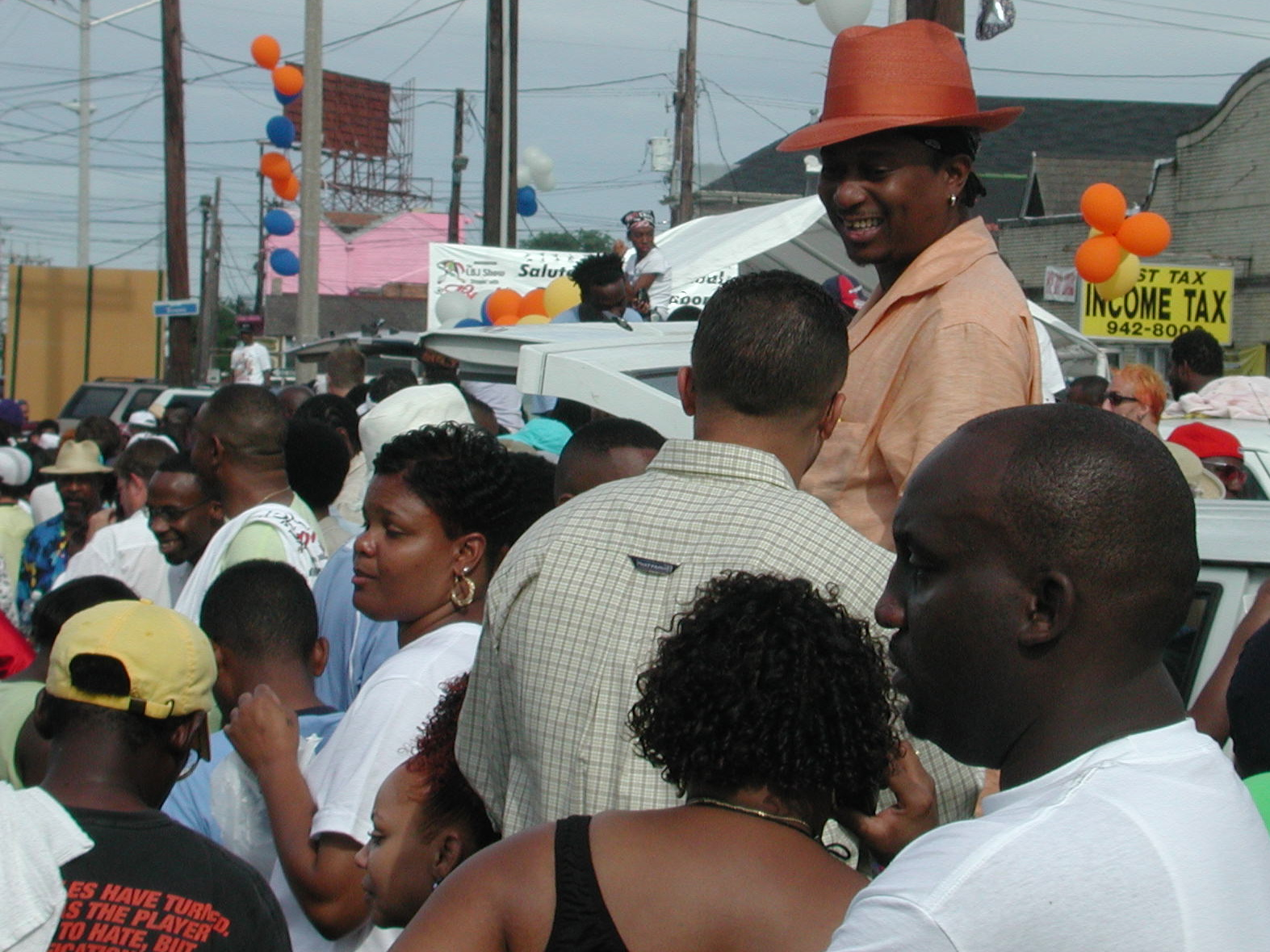
2002 parade attendees

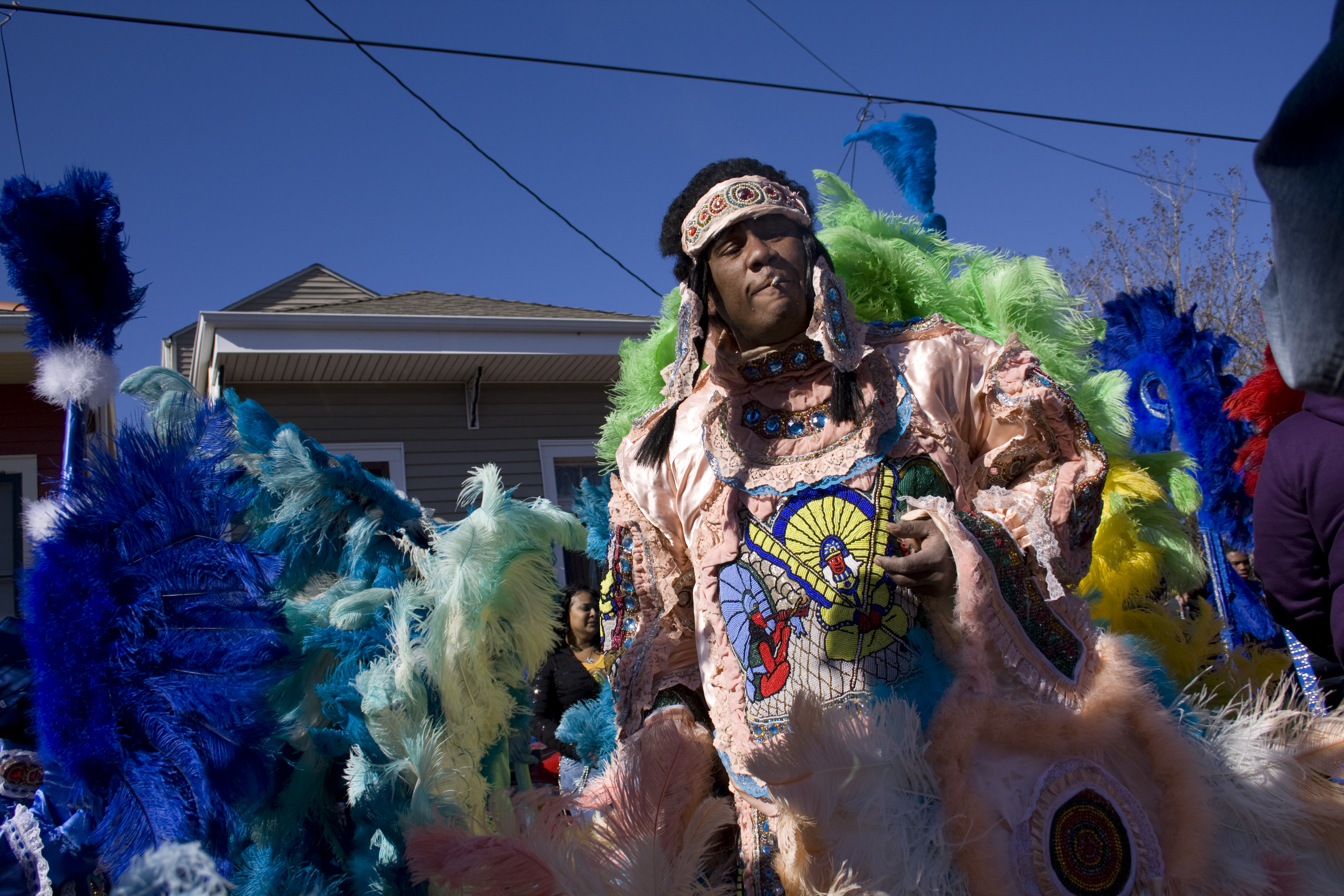
Fat Tuesday Mardi Gras participant

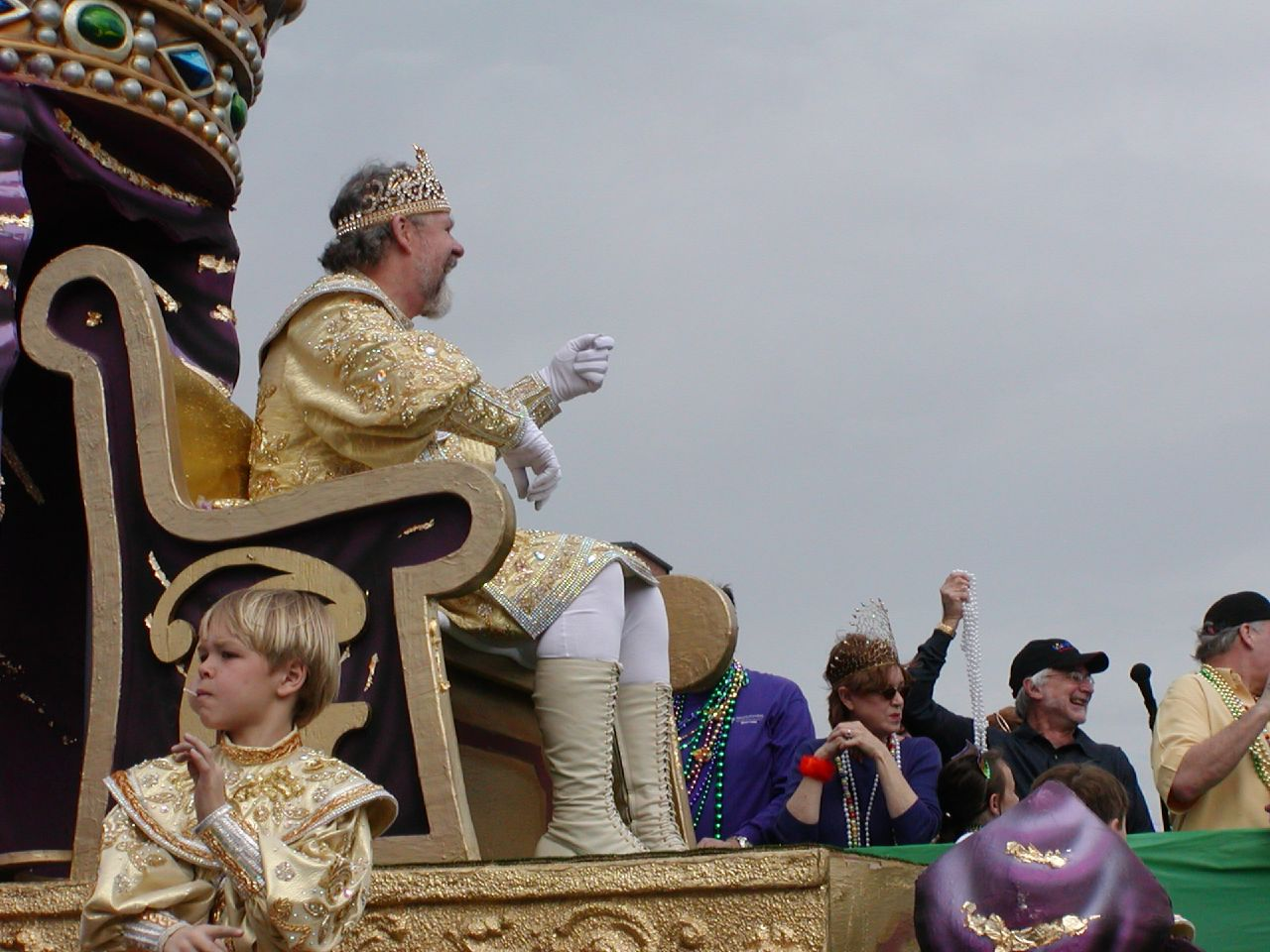
Lafayette Mardi Gras King

== See also ==
- List of festivals in the United States
- Acadian World Congress - occasionally held in Louisiana
