= City of Light =

"(The) City of Light(s)" may refer to:

- Paris, France, the city most commonly referred to as the "City of Light"

== Other cities ==
- Anchorage, Alaska, United States
- Aurora, Illinois, United States
- Baghdad, Iraq, known as the City of Light before the Mongol invasions
- Baltimore, Maryland, United States
- Be'er Sheva, Israel, named by British General Edmund Allenby the "Crown Jewel of the Negev", and the "Desert City of Light"
- Birmingham, Alabama, United States, also known as "The City Of Light", as you approach the city from the mountains it glistens like stars
- Buffalo, New York, United States, as host of the Pan-American Exposition. In 1901, Buffalo was perhaps the most extensively lighted city of its time
- Curepipe, Mauritius, also called "La Ville-Lumière"
- Eindhoven, Netherlands, because of the match industry and the Philips light bulb manufacturing company. The city also has various light-artworks and an annual large light festival called GLOW.
- Elbląg, Poland
- Gwangju, South Korea, literally "Light Province"
- Jyväskylä, Central Finland, Finland
- Johannesburg, South Africa
- Karachi, Sindh, Pakistan, known in the 1960s/1970s as “City of Lights” for its vibrant nightlife
- Las Vegas Valley, United States, as viewed from space, is the brightest city on earth
- Los Angeles, California, called the "City of Light" due to its night scene and the "Bright Lights of Hollywood"
- Lucerne, Switzerland, called "Leuchtenstadt" in German from Latin "Lucerna"
- Lyon, France, also called "La Ville Des Lumières"
- Manresa, Spain
- Medina, known officially as al-Madīnah l-Munawwarah ("The Enlightened City" or “The Radiant City”) or also just as "City of Light"
- Miami, Florida
- Milford, Pennsylvania
- Natchitoches, Louisiana, known for its Natchitoches Christmas Festival
- New Bedford, Massachusetts, America's whaling capital during much of the 19th century, its whale oil lit lamps around the world and lubricated the wheels of the Industrial Revolution. On the 1847 City Seal, its motto is "Lucem Diffundo" (I Spread Light)
- Ohrid, North Macedonia. In antiquity the city was known under the ancient name Lychnidos. probably meaning "City of Light"
- Perth, Western Australia, became known worldwide as the "City of Light" when city's residents lit their house lights and streetlights as American astronaut John Glenn passed overhead while orbiting the Earth on Friendship 7 in 1962. The city repeated the act as Glenn passed overhead on the Space Shuttle in 1998.
- Tehran, Iran
- Tamworth, New South Wales, Australia. Australia's first city with electric street lighting (10 November 1888). The city is known as the "First City of Lights".
- Quanzhou, known as "City of Light" by the work of the Jewish merchant Jacob of Ancona
- Varanasi, Uttar Pradesh, India, also known as Kashi, "The Luminous One"
- Venice, Italy
- Wheeling, West Virginia, home of the annual Oglebay Light Show
- Wolverhampton, United Kingdom 'Out of Darkness Cometh Light' – United Kingdom '"City of Light"'

== Music ==
- Symphony No. 22 (Hovhaness) or City of Light, a 1970 composition by the American composer Alan Hovhaness commissioned for the centenary of Birmingham, Alabama
- City of Light, from 1987 motion picture The Brave Little Toaster
- City of Light (album), a 1997 album by Bill Laswell
- In the City of Lights, a 1999 live album by Sarah Vaughan
- "City of Light", a song by Theatre of Tragedy from Musique (2000)
- City of Light, a 2000 album by Kingdom Heirs
- "The City of Lights" (2005), a song by Future Pilot A.K.A., Grant McLennan and Robert Forster
- The City of Light (Hilltop Hoods video), a 2007 hip-hop video album by Hilltop Hoods
- City of Lights, album by Kareem Salama (2011)
- City of Light, a 2011 light opera by Michael McFaden based on the music of Arthur Sullivan and set in 1907 Lily Dale, New York
- "City of Lights", a song by Runrig from Searchlight (1989)

== Other uses ==
- City of Light, a fictitious island and state of mind in television series The 100
- Banaras: City of Light, a book on the city Banaras by Diana Eck
- City of Light, a 1999 novel by Lauren Belfer, set during the 1901 Pan-American Exposition in Buffalo, New York
- The City of Light, a 1924 novel by Mieczysław Smolarski
- City of Light, an American Thoroughbred racehorse
- The City of Light, a book purportedly made by a scholarly Jewish merchant called "Jacob d'Ancona"
