= Sobriquet =

Assumed or given nickname

A sobriquet (/ˈsoʊ.brɪ.ˌkeɪ, ˌsoʊ.brɪ.ˈkeɪ/ SOH-brih-kay, -KAY also pronounced SOH-brih-ket, -KET) is a descriptive nickname, sometimes assumed, but often given by another. A sobriquet is distinct from a pseudonym in that it is typically a familiar name used in place of a real name without the need for explanation; it may even become more familiar than the original name.

An example is Mohandas Gandhi, who is better known as Mahatma Gandhi (mahatma means 'great soul' in Sanskrit). The existence of sobriquets can evince key historical details and dynamics.

The term sobriquet is equally applicable as a name for a person, group of people, historical event, or place. Well-known places often have sobriquets, such as New York City, often called the "Big Apple", or Rome, the "Eternal City", or Vienna, the "Golden Apple" or Paris the "City of Light".

== Etymology ==
The modern French and English spelling is sobriquet. Two earlier variants are soubriquet and sotbriquet. The first variant, "soubriquet", dates from the 15th century and is rarely used now, in English or French.

The early 14th-century word soubzsbriquez meant a 'little blow under the chin' in French, also described as a chuck under the chin; this was derived from soubs, mod. sous (Latin: sub), 'under'.

== Usage ==
Sobriquets are "a form of identification that goes beyond a traditional name and offers insight into a person’s character, appearance, profession, or any other distinguishing feature". They are used in politics, music, literature and for royalty, celebrities, and athletes.

Candidates for public office and political figures may be described with sobriquets, while living or posthumously. For example, president of the United States Abraham Lincoln was called "Honest Abe". Martin Van Buren was often known as "Old Kinderhook" due to his birth city, which helped popularize the phrase "O.K." An affectionate contemporary sobriquet for Ulysses S. Grant was the "American Sphinx" as a man of deeds rather than for verbal self-promotion.

Early uses of sobriquets in writing and literature include the Dead Sea Scrolls and in Tang and Song (Southern Sung) dynasty poetry. Contemporary usage is common in the English and French languages.

== Examples ==
- The Big Apple – New York, New York, US
- The Big Smoke – London or Toronto
- The Big Yin – Billy Connolly, Glaswegian comedian commonly referred to as "The Big Yin", meaning "The Big One" in Scots
- Columbia – The United States or the Americas, poetic name
- Dixie, Dixieland (from the Mason–Dixon line) – the eleven Southern states that seceded and fought against the U.S. in the American Civil War
- The Emerald Isle - Ireland, in reference to its lush vegetation and cultural association with the colour green
- Emiye Menelik - Emperor Menelik II of Ethiopia, who was popularly and affectionately recognized for his kindness (emiye means 'mother' in Amharic)
- The Fourth Estate – the press
- Gautam Buddha – Siddhartha Gautama, derived from the word budh, which means 'enlightened'.
- Graveyard of empires – Afghanistan, for being the site of military defeats by major world powers, notably by the British Empire in the Anglo-Afghan Wars, the Soviet Union in the Soviet-Afghan War, and the United States in the War in Afghanistan
- John Bull – the UK in general, or specifically its government (originally an attack against the Whigs, their foreign policy, and their financiers who were profiting from wars with other nations).
- The King (of rock and roll) – Elvis Presley, famous vocalist and musician
- The Land Down Under – Australia and New Zealand, because of their location in the Southern Hemisphere, "down under" the equator and most other countries on a map.
- The Land of the Rising Sun – Japan
- The Lion City – Singapore, the city-state, also known as Little Red Dot, The Garden City
- The Little Apple – Manhattan, Kansas, US
- The Lucky Country - Australia, in reference to the book of the same name
- Man's best friend – dogs, derived from the origins of dogs, it indicates the relationship that has developed between the two species as they have each evolved to form a symbiotic relationship that is unique among human relationships to domestic animals.
- The Mile High City – Denver, Colorado, US
- The Mini Apple – Minneapolis, Minnesota, US
- Motor City – Detroit, Michigan, US
- Papa Doc – François Duvalier, 34th president of Haiti
- Pearl of the Orient – the Philippines, referring to its location in the Southeast Asia (or the East, with "Orient" meaning "East")
- The Sage of Chelsea – Thomas Carlyle, Scots philosopher
- Scotty from marketing – Scott Morrison, referring to his former marketing career
- The Sun King – Louis XIV, King of France
- Uncle Joe – Joseph Stalin
- Uncle Sam – the U.S. in general or specifically its government, likely from the initials "U.S."
- The War to End All Wars – World War I; used ironically since World War II
- The Windy City – Chicago, Illinois, US

== See also ==
- Elegant variation
- Moniker
- Epithet

== Sources ==
- This article incorporates text from a publication now in the public domain: Chisholm, Hugh, ed. (1911). "Sobriquet". Encyclopædia Britannica (11th ed.). Cambridge University Press.
