= Wehle =

Wehle is a surname. Notable people with the surname include:

- Kim Wehle, law professor and legal analyst
- Peter Wehle (1914–1986), Austrian actor, writer, composer, and cabaret performer
- Philip C. Wehle (1906–1978), American major general
- Susan Wehle (1953–2009), American cantor
