= Jane Meade Welch =

American journalist and historian (1854–1931)

Jane Mead Welch
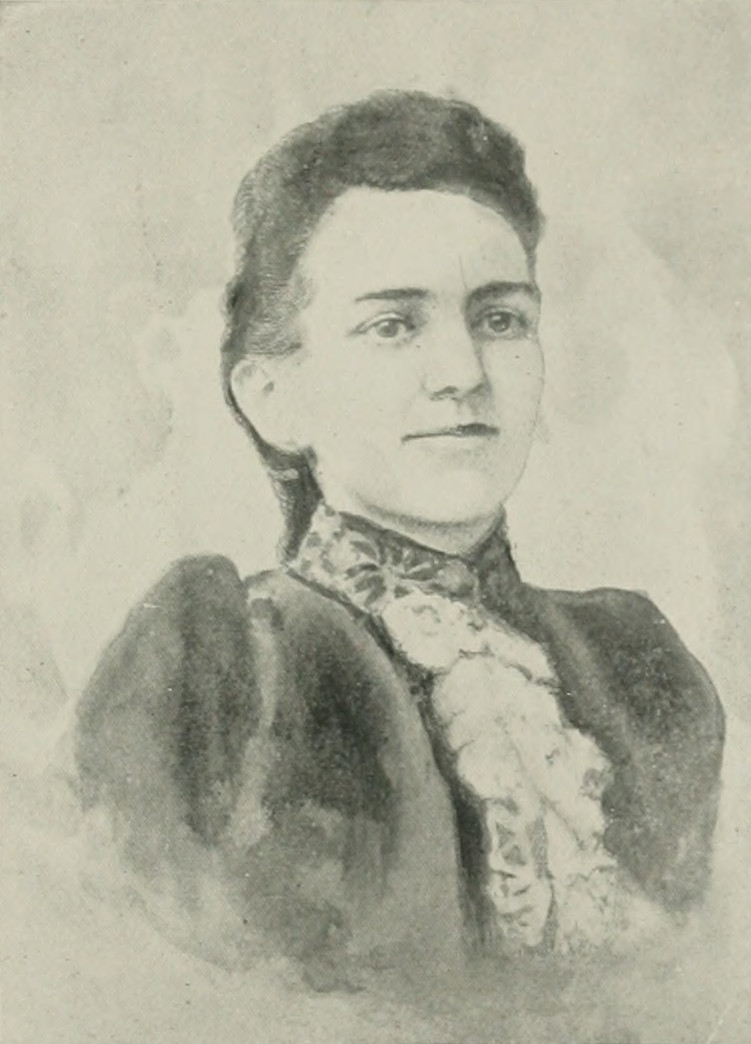
- Photo in A Woman of the Century
- Born: Jane Mead Welch; March 11, 1854; Buffalo, New York, U.S.
- Died: September 30, 1931 (aged 77)
- Resting place: Forest Lawn Cemetery
- Education: Buffalo Female Academy, Elmira College
- Occupations: Journalist; historian
- Writing career
- Subject: American history

Jane Meade Welch (March 11, 1854 – September 30, 1931) was an American journalist and historian who lectured and wrote on American history. She was the first woman in Buffalo, New York to become a professional journalist, the first American woman to lecture at Cambridge University, and the first American woman whose work was accepted by the British Association. Welch was a pioneer among American women in developing an extensive group of American history lecture courses.

== Early life and education ==
Jane Meade Welch, daughter of Thomas Cary Welch and Maria Allen Meade Welch, was born in Buffalo, New York on March 11, 1854. Of New England ancestry, she was descended from John Alden, Priscilla Alden, and Samuel Seabury.

Welch graduated from Buffalo Female Academy (now Buffalo Seminary) at the age of 16. At Elmira College, she was the best historian of her class, often rising at four o'clock in the morning to study David Hume and Thomas Babington Macaulay. Her studies were interrupted in her sophomore year by an almost fatal illness.

== Career ==
=== Journalist ===
Welch was an invalid for two years before she regained her health and became a practical journalist, beginning as a music critic. For a year, she served as a general writer on the Buffalo Express. She next joined the staff of the Buffalo Courier (now Buffalo Courier), writing anonymously. During the 10 years she served at the Courier, Welch worked in a variety of areas, from writing advertisements to pieces on a political leader. She served as society editor and occasional contributor of editorial articles, as well as preparing and conducting a woman's work column. Welch was the first woman in Buffalo to make a career of journalism.

=== Historian ===
While working as a journalist, Welch instituted history classes at her home in Buffalo inviting her female friends. The success of these classes induced Welch to devote herself full-time to history. She became a regular lecturer on American history at the Buffalo Seminary, St. Margaret's school, Buffalo; Mrs. Sylvanus Reed's school, New York; The Misses Masters School, Dobbs Ferry, New York; and Ogontz school, Pennsylvania (now Penn State Abington), Cornell University, and the Chautauqua Assembly. In February 1891, she gave a series of six lectures in the Berkeley Lyceum Theater in New York City, on the advice of her friend and former townswoman, Frances Folsom Cleveland Preston. With every lecture, Welch's audience grew in numbers; some of the attendees included Preston, Mrs. William Collins Whitney, Anne Wroe Scollay Curtis, Mrs. Edwin Lawrence Godkin, Rev. Dr. Morgan Dix, President Seth Low of Columbia University, Dorman Bridgman Eaton, and the Rev. Dr. Charles Deems.

Welch was the first American woman to lecture at Cambridge University, and whose work was accepted by the British Association. She was a pioneer among American women in talking about American history in the form of extended lecture courses. Her writings on this topic were voluminous and valuable.

== Personal life ==
Welch traveled extensively in the US, as well as in Great Britain, France, Holland, Belgium, Switzerland and Germany. She lived at 514 Delaware Avenue in Buffalo for 30 years.

Jane Meade Welch died in 1931 and was buried at Forest Lawn Cemetery.

== Selected works ==
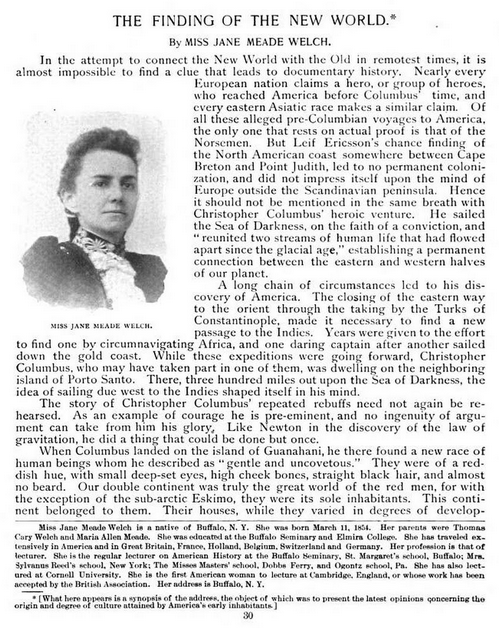
"The Finding of the New World"

- 1885, The city of Buffalo
- 1887, The neighborhood of the international park
- 1894, A finding list

== Lectures ==
- "The Making of the Constitution"
- "The Organization of the Government"
- "The War of 1812"
- "John Quincy Adams and Andrew Jackson"
- "The Territorial Development of the United States"
- "The Marking of Historic Sites on the Niagara Frontier"
- "The Finding of the New World"
