= Stryyewka =

Village in Grodno Region, Belarus

Stryyewka Стрыеўка (Belarusian)
- Village
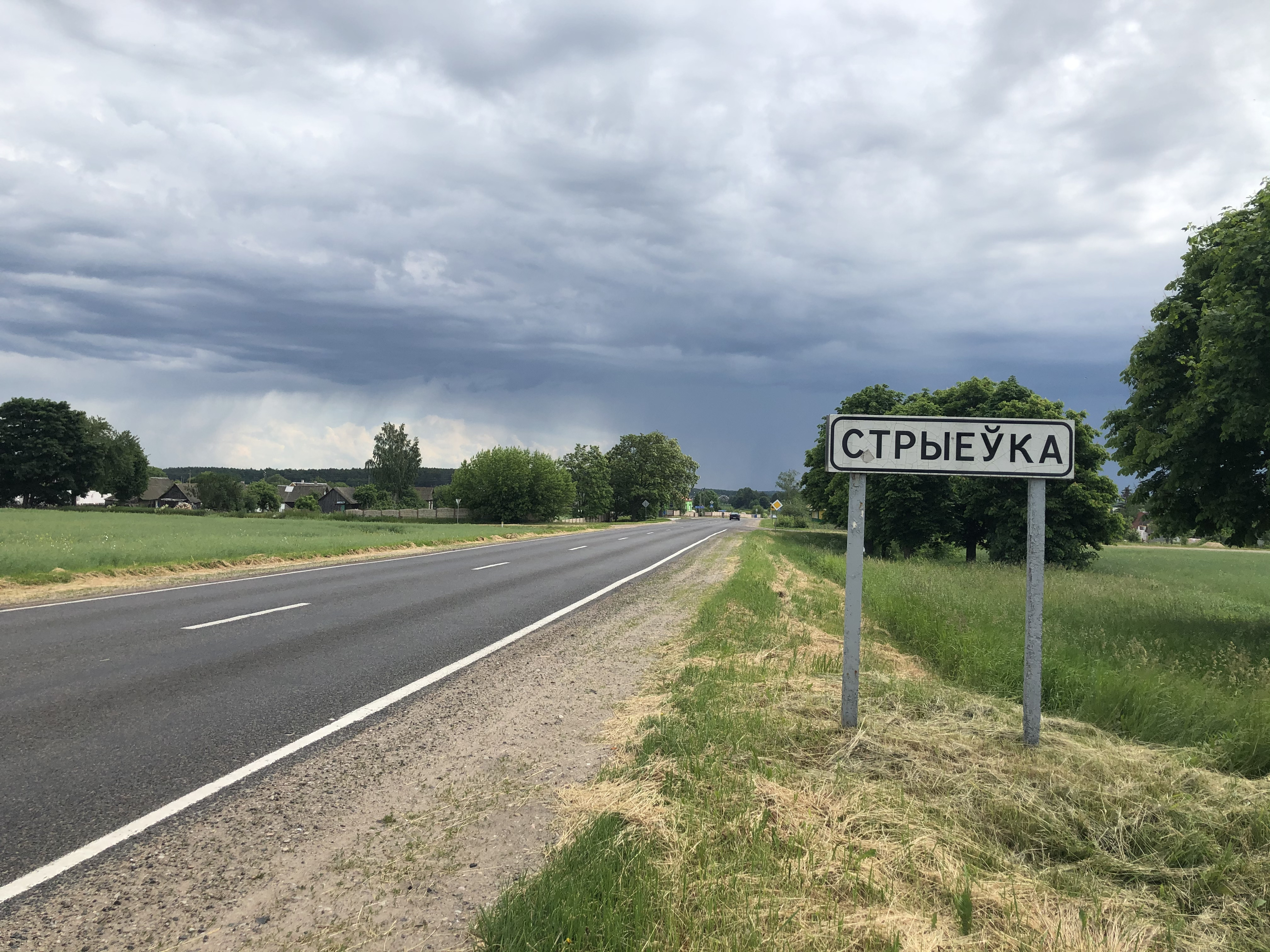

- Location within Belarus
- Coordinates: 53°44′08″N 24°08′21″E
- Country: Belarus
- Region: Grodno Region
- District: Grodno District
- Time zone: UTC+3 (MSK)

Stryyewka (Note: BGN/PCGN romanization of Belarusian.) or Strievka (Belarusian: Стрыеўка, romanized: Stryjeŭka; (Note: Official transliteration.) Russian: Стриевка, romanized: Striyevka; Polish: Stryjówka) is a village in Grodno District, Grodno Region, Belarus.

== History ==
In the interwar period, the village was within Poland, in the Białystok Voivodeship, in Grodno County, in Aziory Commune. After the Soviet invasion of Poland in 1939, the village became part of the BSSR.

=== World War II ===
On September 20, 1943, German military police smashed the VIII Strike Cadre Battalion of the Home Army commanded by Lieutenant Zbigniew Czarnocki pseudonym "Czarny" near the village - 32 partisans died, while 3 survived. As a result of the denunciation of a village resident, the Polish unit was surrounded when stopped for the night. Earlier, it fought skirmishes on the crossing over the Niemen, near Wiercielishki and in the Gluche Bagno wilderness. In Stryjewka an obelisk commemorating the soldiers of the "Czarny" was erected.

Cadet Bohdan Smolarski (born 1924) - son of Mieczysław - a writer (1888-1967), was posthumously awarded the Cross of Valour in 1966 by the then Minister of National Defense, Marshal of Poland Marian Spychalski.

From 1941-1944 it was under German occupation.

=== Belarus ===
After the war the village returned to the BSSR. After 1991 it became part of the Republic of Belarus.

The monument on the grave of the Home Army soldiers was erected in 1992 thanks to the efforts of the World Association of Home Army Soldiers with the support of the Council for the Protection of Struggle and Martyrdom Sites. It is maintained by members of the Society of Polish Artists from Grodno operating at the Union of Poles in Belarus. In July 2022, the monument was destroyed by Belarusian authorities.
