= City of Light (novel) =

1999 novel by Lauren Belfer

City Of Light
- Author: Lauren Belfer
- Cover artist: Honi Werner
- Language: English
- Genre: Realistic Fiction
- Publisher: Island Books
- Publication date: 1999
- Publication place: United States
- Media type: Print (hardback & paperback)
- Pages: 689 (US paperback edition)

City Of Light is a 1999 novel by Lauren Belfer.

== Plot ==
The story is set in the city of Buffalo, New York in 1901, as the planning and construction of the Pan-American Exposition is under way. The protagonist and narrator, Louisa Barrett, is headmistress of the Macaulay School for Girls, inspired by The Buffalo Seminary, and is a very influential woman in a time of male predominance. The first major event in the book is the death of Karl Speyer, an engineering hero that designed the generators for the hydroelectric plant at Niagara Falls. This causes a chain of events that leads Louisa to become involved in the struggle of the city's hierarchy for control of Niagara.

It was revealed in the novel that Louisa Barrett was sexually abused by the former president Grover Cleveland. She couldn't speak up because she feared the same fate as Maria Halpin—who had been sent to an asylum.

Thomas Sinclair realizes that Grace looks a lot like Louisa Barrett - Grace's godmother and real mother. Louisa's enthusiasm for Grace reinforces this idea - she loves Grace because she is her real mom.

Bates as a radical - always cites God, Nature. He seems to think that electricity is only for the rich and prefers primitive gas lamps etc. Has dramatic flair. In the name of God, misapplication of cause. Susannah Riley cried after the speech. She is a big fan of Bates.

Ms. Mary Talbert (mother of Millicent) - a black woman seems to be protesting against the Pan-Am Exposition, because they portray the old plantation as a happy place where black laborers worked to raise family. However, conditions in plantations were inhumane and black were subject to physical and verbal abuse, and many more undesirable actions (treated like animals etc.)

Louisa dreams of starting a life with Franklin Fiske for a brief moment, but later on Grace reveals to her suspicion about her father wanting to court her - tom courting Louisa. Louisa is shocked but would love the possibility. Franklin Fiske is an undercover writer for the World News - his alibi is that he is a photographer (capturing the scenic sites of Niagara). He believes Speyer's death was an act of murder and wants to investigate the issue more. He asks Louisa whether she knows anything that might potentially help him determine the murderer. After the death of the second plant manager Mr. Fitzhugh, Peter Fronzcyk, brother of Maddie Fronzcyk replaces him.

Tom asks Louisa whether she wants to get married - seems like the logical choice - to ask someone he already knew. She quickly shows signs of interest but keeps calm - gradually gets more comfortable with the idea of marriage. She could finally interact with Grace in ways she never could before, such as hugging her etc., more affectionate forms of love. Another death - the chief manager (something like that of the Niagara plant) - Louisa has her suspicions that the two deaths - Karl's and this guys (Fitzhugh) were no accident, but instead a series of murders. She wants to find out the syndicates.

Tom and Louisa develop a deeper relationship, kiss, Louisa lies down on Tom's chest. Tom explains his use of Peter but Frederick Krakauer - J. Pierpont Morgan's man, overheard their conversation. Tom says his dream is to generate so much electricity so that he can give electricity out for free. Morgan and Tom - clash of goals.

Tom found out Franklin Fiske's secret - that he was an undercover writer for the World magazine. Frustrated he confronted Louisa, since she was the only one he told. Apparently, Tom found out through other means. Tom invited Franklin to a grand lunch - He told me a complex tale about the bribery of water inspectors. He corroborated information I've found elsewhere, although he offered non-concrete proof. (398) Franklin then admits he loves Louisa and gives her an invitation for marriage. Louisa, while attracted to Franklin, realizes that her only path was towards Grace, with Tom.

Louisa tries to seek out the help of Grover Cleveland, the father of her child by visiting his house. Grover Cleveland turns out to be so much different from what Louisa pictured him to be at the night at the Iroquois hotel. Louisa asks Cleveland about protecting Grace, through his connections with Francis Lyde Stenson - the chief attorney of Morgan - the one behind threats to Grace. Cleveland concludes that no man would place threats on an innocent girl and is helpless.

Louisa returns home, where she sees Bates and Susannah get sent to jail (for bombing the power plant), receives a letter from Francesca requesting her to go to the hospital/ asylum. There she sees Susannah, who informs Louisa she lied about the male nude paintings and reveals to Louisa that she was the one who killed Karl Speyer and James Fitzhugh, the replacement engineer. She apparently seduced both of them and led them to their watery deaths in the Niagara Falls. She claims to have a full assistant who helped her commit the murders and threatens to reveal the assistant. (who was revealed to be Grace, she stole his father's papers because Susannah said that she would be a heroine)

Dexter Rumsey revealed that he and a couple of other friends - Wilcox, Miss Love, knew Louisa's secret. Mr. Rumsey was the only one who knew for sure since he visited New York when Louisa was supposedly there. Kreuzer left the city under the influence of Rumsey. Tom was also influenced by Rumsey to leave to the west to work on the Arizona river - create a dam.

Grace dies in Goat island because she was twirled and fell to hit her head on a rock. Louisa dreams of what would Grace would have been like, claiming that it lightens her spirit. Franklin Fiske still tries to court Louisa, but Louisa knows she won't get married.

== Characters ==
Louisa Barrett is the 34-year-old headmistress of the Macaulay School For Girls. Although tall, slender and blond, she is considered 'unmarriagable' because of her position in society. A conservative dresser, she socializes easily with the rich and powerful men of Buffalo, especially those on the Macaulay Board Of Trustees, and is not to be considered a 'typical' woman of the time. Her Mother died when she was very young and her Father was a professor of geology at Williams College. It was her goal as well, for a time, to travel to Europe to finish her schooling and become a geologist like her father, but personal ties and her desire to keep a secretive watch over her daughter, Grace, kept her in Buffalo. She is the narrator of the story and provides insight on most of the other characters met in the book. She is also named Grace's Godmother by Margaret. She is a fictional character.

Millicent Talbert is a 13-year-old student at Macaulay. She is the first and only colored student to attend, and therefore is often assumed to be attending on scholarship, but in reality comes from a rich family. Millicent is an orphan who came to Buffalo from Ohio to live with her Aunt and Uncle, who had adopted her. She is mature for her age and is the first to tell Louisa that Grace is acting suicidal. She volunteers at the Fitch Creche, set up by Maria Love as the first daycare center in Buffalo, and is asked to escort Grace home by Mrs. Atkins, Principal of the lower grade school, because of her color. Millicent is a minor character that first appears on page 8 of the paperback copy of City Of Light and is a fictional character.

Tom Sinclair is the manager of the hydroelectric plant on the Niagara River. He is in his mid-forties and is over six feet tall, with pale brown hair, a clean shaven fave, and angular cheekbones. He was married to Margaret Winspear, who died of birth complications a year before the book takes place. He lives in a mansion on the corner of Lincoln Parkway and Forest Avenue with his 9-year-old, adopted daughter Grace. He is an Irish immigrant who worked most of his young life in a glass bottle factory. Born into poverty and raised Catholic, Margaret's parents were opposed to their marriage at first. Tom came to America and was working at a Pennsylvania railroad telegraph office when John J. Albright saw his potential and decided to sponsor him through college at Rensselaer Polytechnic Institute. He married Margaret at Trinity Church in Buffalo after she came into control of her family's fortune and he denounced his Catholicism. He is portrayed as a caring employer, paying for the medical expenses of his employees doing high risk jobs, but Louisa still suspects him of having a role in Karl Speyer's death, after overhearing an argument between the two of them on the night he died at the Sinclair mansion where Tom was heard yelling the phrase "don't threaten me Speyer." He later mysteriously donates one million dollars to the Maculay School as an endowment to Margaret. He first appeared on page 38 of the paperback copy of City Of Light and is a fictional character.

Margaret Sinclair is the wife of Tom Sinclair and adoptive mother to Grace. Louisa's best friend, she had graduated by the time Louisa came to Macaulay as a teacher, but she stayed to pursue a college entrance curriculum, and was tutored by Louisa in Greek and Latin. Margaret was of the Winspear family, one of Buffalo's elite, but her parents had died when she was young, leaving her to live with her grandmother. Her grandmother allowed her to study to fill the years before marriage, but when Margaret was accepted at Vassar, Mrs. Winspear decided to take her on escapade across eastern Europe, visiting Egypt, Ceylon, Singapore, Malaya and India. When they returned, Margaret no longer wanted to attend college, but disregarded her grandmothers wishes all the same in deciding to marry Tom Sinclair. She is the one who was responsible for organizing the breakfast carts, a charity act that offered a free breakfast to any child the opportunity to grab something to eat on the way to school. Maria Love and Ansley Wilcox, Christian charity reformers, were strongly against giving aide to just anyone without evaluating them to see if they deserved it. Since Margaret funded these carts out of her own pocket, Maria Love refused to keep them going after Margaret's death. She is a fictional character.

Grace Sinclair is the adopted, 9-year-old daughter of Margaret and Tom Sinclair. She is really the daughter of Louisa and the former president Grover Cleveland, Louisa was forced to give up the child in order to protect herself from public exposure and because she was unable to care for the child herself. She arranged to go away for a semester to study in New York City and in Europe, which she used as an excuse to hide her pregnancy. During that time, she contacted Margaret, who had so far been unsuccessful in conceiving a child, and proposed an adoption. Margaret accepted once she had been assured that the child came from a good family, which Louisa lied about, creating a fictional situation for Grace's background story. After the birth, Grace was sent with a doctor and a wet nurse to meet up with Dr Pealmutter, the Sinclair family doctor, who would bring the child to Tom and Margaret, while Louisa traveled to Europe. Grace is described as a talented artist and a "fine mimic" and she has a love for play-acting. After her Margaret's death, Grace feels guilty and starts talking about taking her own life. This understandable upsets Louisa, but no one else finds Grace's behavior to be anything out of the ordinary. Grace first appears on page 28 of the paperback copy of City Of Light and is a fictional character.

Karl Speyer is the engineer hero that designed the turbines and generators that are being used at the hydroelectric plant on Niagara. Speyer works on the hydroelectric plant at Niagara, but is with the Westinghouse Electric and Manufacturing Company, He is in Buffalo for a consulting job. He is described as a big man with a dark, thick beard and broad shoulders. He is killed by Susanah Riley, the art teacher at Maculay, who lures him onto the thin ice of the ornamental lake at Delaware Park and lets him drown once he's fallen through. His death sets the stage for the rest of the story to progress. He first appears on page 48 of the paperback copy of City Of Light and is a fictional character.

Peter Fronczyk is the brother of Maddie Fronczyk, a Maculay scholarship student. He is in his early twenties and has blue eyes with brown, curling hair. He is a switchboard trainee at the hydroelectric plant at Niagara. His and Maddie's family lives in Echota ('village of refuge' in Cherokee) which was designed by Stanford White as community for the power station workers. He first appears on page 108 of the paperback copy of City Of Light and is a fictional character.

Francesca Coatsworth is a self-employed architect and is a Maculay graduate who also attended Wellesley at the same time as Louisa. She is in charge of designing the addition to the Maculay school after Louisa receives the million dollar endowment from Tom Sinclair. Her family is one of the oldest and wealthiest in Buffalo and she is carrying on a relationship with Susanah Riley, the Maculay Art Teacher. Maria Love puts her in charge of the infant asylum, where Abigail Rushman's child eventually dies

Susannah Riley is the Maculay art teacher, who also gives private art lessons to Grace Sinclair. She is responsible for killing Karl Speyer, whom she lured onto thin ice and then let drown, and James Fitzhugh, whom she pushed into the Niagara River. She can be considered a radical conservationist, after being seen as a close confidante to Daniel Henry Bates, and is eventually sent to the Buffalo Asylum.

Daniel Henry Bates is a radical conservationist who gives a lecture on the evils of the hydroelectric plant at Lyric Hall one night. He is old and thin, with a white beard and wild hair, and proclaims to have a list of New York State inspectors that are being bribed to overlook how much water is being used by the hydroelectric plant. He first appears on page 322 of the paperback copy of City Of Light and he is a fictional character.
