= Kim Wehle =

American legal academic

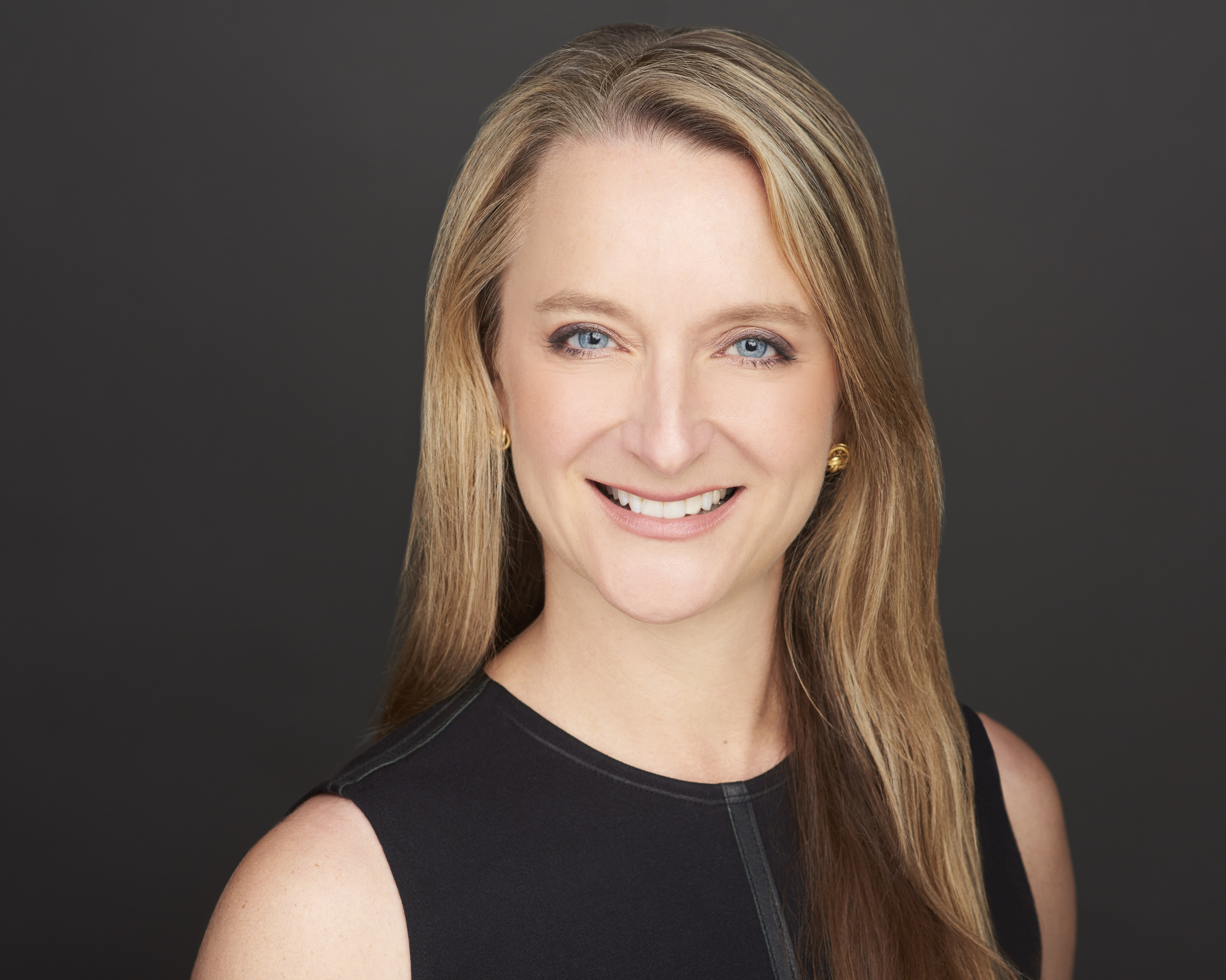
- Education: University of Pennsylvania; Cornell University (BA); University of Michigan (JD)
- Occupations: Professor, lawyer, author, public speaker, legal analyst and news commentator
- Employer: University of Baltimore School of Law
- Website: kimwehle.com

Kimberly Lynn Wehle is a law professor, writer, public speaker, lawyer, and legal contributor for ABC News. She is educated in civil procedure, constitutional law, administrative law, and the separation of powers.

Wehle writes on democracy and the separation of powers, outsourcing government, and the federal administrative state. Wehle has authored four books, including How to Read the Constitution – and Why and What You Need to Know About Voting – and Why, and How to Think Like a Lawyer—and Why: A Common-Sense Guide to Everyday Dilemmas. She is best known for her ability to demystify legal concepts. Her latest book, Pardon Power: How the Pardon System Works—and Why, was published by Woodhall Press on September 2, 2024. John Dean, White House Counsel to President Richard Nixon and a primary figure in the Watergate hearings, wrote the foreword.

== Early life and education ==
Wehle grew up in Buffalo, New York, the second of five children. During her childhood, she attended Catholic elementary schools and a non-sectarian all-girls school where she played lacrosse and explored her talent for the visual arts. Her mother, Betty Jane Wehle, was an amateur artist who started her own Montessori preschool in a Buffalo suburb in the early 1970s; she died in 2006. Her father, Richard E. Wehle, was a management consultant who died in 2015.

Wehle graduated high school from the Buffalo Seminary and went on to attend the University of Pennsylvania for one year before transferring to Cornell University, where she was a member of the Kappa Kappa Gamma sorority as well as the Phi Beta Kappa honor society. As an English major at Cornell, Wehle won a department award for the best honors thesis of her class. The paper was entitled The Vision of Flannery O'Connor. In the summer after her junior year, she attended the Leo Marchutz School of Art in Aix-en-Provence, France. Wehle was offered a full scholarship to remain at the art school, but ultimately turned it down in order to complete her undergraduate degree at Cornell.

After graduating magna cum laude from Cornell, Wehle went on to attend the University of Michigan Law School. There, Wehle was an editor of the Michigan Law Review. She graduated with a J.D. cum laude.

== Career ==
Wehle began her career practicing law as a clerk to a federal judge, Hon. Charles R. Richey, of the U.S. District Court in Washington, D.C., then at the Federal Trade Commission; the Whitewater Investigation, where she worked with Independent Counsel Kenneth Starr and U.S. Supreme Court Justice Brett Kavanaugh; the U.S. Attorney's Office in Washington, D.C.; and then worked in private practice. She has also argued several cases before the United States Court of Appeals for the D.C. Circuit and other appellate courts.

Wehle is a tenured Professor of Law at the University of Baltimore School of Law. She has previously taught at American University Washington College of Law, George Washington University Law School and the University of Oklahoma College of Law. Wehle specializes in the respective powers of the three branches of the federal government.

She was selected to serve as a Fulbright Scholar at Leiden University in the Netherlands in 2025 where she will engage in research on how citizens across six global democracies understand and internalize constitutional norms. She will also serve as the inaugural Fellow at the John Adams Institute in Amsterdam.

Wehle has written four books, and is, as of June 2022, a legal contributor for ABC News. She began her career in legal journalism unexpectedly. In 2017, she came across a news article that referred to the President's pardon power under the Constitution as "absolute." This statement prompted her to write her first op-ed, published in The Baltimore Sun, to underscore that most of the Constitution is not black and white, but grey, and that even the pardon power is subject to checks and balances. From there, she began writing with greater frequency on issues of constitutional and legal significance for various journalistic outlets, including The Hill, The Bulwark, The LA Times, The Atlantic, Politico, Newsweek, and The Guardian.

Based on Kim's written work, she is regularly invited to make media appearances on radio, podcasts, and TV. She has appeared as a guest on BBC, CNN, MSNBC, NPR, Fox News, Al Jazeera, C-SPAN, PBS NewsHour, Peacock TV, NBC, Newsy, the Canadian Broadcasting Corporation, France 24, and on major networks in the Netherlands, Australia, and Ireland. Her current role for ABC News began with the hearings by the House Committee on January 6, 2021 and now spans other breaking legal news. During the first Impeachment trial of Donald J. Trump, she provided in depth legal analysis as a legal contributor for CBS, and appeared on Face the Nation with Margaret Brennan.

Wehle has interviewed leading experts on legal and political news on a show called #SimplePolitics, which is available on YouTube, and writes a newsletter by the same name.

== Works ==
- How to Read the Constitution--and Why, New York, NY : Harper, 2019. ISBN 9780062914361, OCLC 1051078589
- What You Need to Know About Voting--and Why, New York, NY : Harper, 2020. ISBN 9780062974785
- How to Think Like a Lawyer—and Why, New York, NY : Harper, 2022. ISBN 0063067560
- Pardon Power: How the Pardon System Works—and Why, Woodhall Press, 2024. ISBN 1954907508
