= Lauren Belfer =

American writer

- Education: Buffalo Seminary; Swarthmore College; Columbia University
- Occupation: Author
- Writing career
- Genre: Historical Fiction
- Notable works: City of Light; A Fierce Radiance; And After the Fire
- Website: www.laurenbelfer.com

Lauren Belfer is an American author of four novels: City of Light, A Fierce Radiance, And After the Fire and Ashton Hall, which was published in June 2022.

== Personal life ==
Lauren Belfer was born in Rochester, New York and grew up in Buffalo, New York, where she attended the Buffalo Seminary. The school would later serve as the basis for the girls' school depicted in her debut novel, City Of Light, about Buffalo, NY during the Pan-American Exposition.

Belfer majored in Medieval Studies at Swarthmore College (graduated 1975), has an M.F.A. from Columbia University, and worked as a file clerk at an art gallery, a paralegal, an assistant photo editor at a newspaper, a fact checker at magazines, and as a researcher and associate producer at CBS News and on documentary films.

She is married to noted musicologist Michael Marissen and lives in Greenwich Village, New York City. She has one child, Tristan.

== Work ==
Her debut novel, City Of Light, was a New York Times bestseller as well as a number one Book Sense pick, a Barnes & Noble Discover Award nominee, a New York Times Notable Book, a Library Journal Best Book, a Main Selection of the Book-Of-The-Month Club, and a bestseller in Great Britain. It has been translated into seven languages and adapted into a stage play by Anthony Clarvoe.

Her second novel, A Fierce Radiance, is a historical thriller that follows the development of penicillin during World War II in New York City. It was published by HarperCollins in June 2010. This novel was named one of the best novels of 2010 by The Washington Post and it was one of the year's five best mysteries for NPR. The paperback edition was released in March 2011.

Her third novel, And After The Fire, is a powerful and passionate novel inspired by historical events about two women, one European and one American, and the mysterious choral masterpiece by Johann Sebastian Bach that changes both of their lives. It has been compared to A.S. Byatt's Possession and received a starred review from Booklist. USA Today gave And After The Fire a 4-star review, writing that the novel "swells with life’s great themes—love, death, family and faith—and the insistent, dark music of loss.” The New Yorker called And After The Fire "provocative." It was published and released by HarperCollins, on May 3, 2016 and was awarded a National Jewish Book Award in January 2017.

In May 2016, Belfer and Marissen were profiled in The New York Times. In the article, they discuss their working process, Bach, and writing a novel with musical accuracy.

In January 2017, Belfer and Marissen were interviewed by Michael Enright for the CBC radio program "Sunday Edition."

Belfer's fiction has also been published in the Michigan Quarterly Review, Shenandoah, and Henfield Prize Stories. Her nonfiction has appeared in the New York Times Book Review, the Washington Post Book World, the Christian Science Monitor, and elsewhere.

Belfer was interviewed as an author/historian for the PBS documentary on Elbert Hubbard entitled Elbert Hubbard: An American Original.

== Awards ==
- 2016: National Jewish Book Award for And After The Fire
