= DeltaFest =

Annual country music festival

DeltaFest was a two-day country music festival in Monroe, Louisiana. The festival was held annually at Chennault Park during the month of October. The last DeltaFest occurred in the summer of 2013. There are no upcoming events planned as of August 2015.

In 2007, performers included Charlie Daniels and Morris Day.

In 2008, performers included Cowboy Mouth.

The festival was one of the top 20 events in the Southeastern United States for October 2008 as given by the Southeast Tourism Society.
