= Mieczysław Smolarski =

Polish writer and poet

Mieczysław Marian Smolarski (April 6, 1888, Kraków – January 21, 1967, Warsaw) was a Polish writer and poet, whose works included examples of the utopian novel in Polish science fiction, two of which were allegedly plagiarized by Aldous Huxley for his landmark novel Brave New World. He was a close friend of Stefan Żeromski and Karol Irzykowski. His novels and short stories were inspired by the fantastic works of Antoni Lange and Stefan Grabiński. His poems were influenced by the traumatic experiences of both World Wars.

== Biography ==
He was born on April 6, 1888, in Kraków, to Kazimierz Smolarski (a lawyer) and Maria Smolarski (née Ripper).

In 1906, he began studying law at the Jagiellonian University, but after the first half of a year he switched to the Faculty of Philosophy, to study the history of literature, art history, and philosophy, earning a doctorate in 1911. In 1912 he moved for a year to Paris. After returning to Poland in 1914 he became an employee at Czartoryski Museum in Kraków. In 1916–18, he was a middle school teacher in Zakopane.

In 1918 he moved permanently to Warsaw, where he became deputy head of Bureau for the Council of State of the Kingdom of Poland, whose creation was contemplated in the later years of WWI. After the Second Polish Republic was established instead, at the end of the war, he was appointed to a position on the administration of the Sejm (Polish Parliament). In May 1934 he resigned from this job due to a conflict with the new director of the Bureau Władysław Dziadosz. After some time he was employed as an official in the Foreign Ministry, where he worked until the outbreak of World War II.

In 1928, he declared his accession to the Polish Literary Chamber (Council). He was a founding member of the Polish PEN Club. In 1929, he was the founder and chairman of the Polish Fiction Association, active until 1937.

He spent the years of the German occupation in the capital. In the summer of 1940 he was arrested by the Gestapo and was imprisoned in Pawiak for several weeks. During the Warsaw Uprising of 1944 his house was destroyed, like much of the city.

After the war, in 1945 he became the deputy curator in the Nieborów branch of the National Museum of Warsaw. In the years 1946-1951 - when the desolate Warsaw was being rebuilt - he stayed in Łódź, which served as a temporary capital. Then he returned to Warsaw, where among other things he wrote several travel guides.

After the war, he was a member of the Polish Writers' Union and from 1957 the Writers' Club "Krąg".

=== Alleged plagiarism by Huxley ===
His books Miasto światłości (The City of Light, 1924) and Podróż poślubna pana Hamiltona (The Honeymoon Trip of Mr. Hamilton, 1928) were allegedly plagiarized by Aldous Huxley in Brave New World, published in 1932. Since the books were translated to English (as well as to Russian, Spanish, Italian and German) Huxley could have had a chance to read them. The assertions of plagiarism were considered by the PEN Club, but there was no resolution.

== Personal life ==
His wife was Halina Bronikowska-Smolarska (1888–1964) a poet.

His son Bohdan (1924–1943) was a soldier of the anti-Nazi underground Armia Krajowa (Home Army), serving in the "VIII Strike Personnel Battalion" of Lieutenant Zbigniew Czarnocki "Czarny". He was among 24 underground fighters who were betrayed by an inhabitant of the village of Stryjówka and perished nearby in an unequal fight with the German Army and Military Police, on September 20, 1943. The name of 'Podchor. (Ensign) Bohdan Smolarski "Krzysztof" ' appears among the other names of the fallen fighters, on a plaque erected there after the war, affixed to a tall obelisk surrounded by young trees, fenced and well maintained.

== Bibliography ==
- Warneńczyk (1920–1921)
- Archiwariusz Gordon (Archivist Gordon) (1921)
- Miasto światłości (1924)
- Czarcie kręgi (1926)
- Poszukiwacz złota (1927)
- Podróż poślubna pana Hamiltona (1928)
- Lalka Hanny Korda (1929)
- Przygoda jednej nocy (1932)
- Światło nad księgami (1954)
- W złoconych pałacach wielkiego chana (1956)
- Pierścień z Apollonem (1957)
