= Holiday Trail of Lights =

Annual event in Louisiana

The Louisiana Holiday Trail of Lights is eight cities in north Louisiana (Shreveport, Bossier City, Minden, Monroe, West Monroe, Natchitoches and Alexandria, Pineville) that collectively offer festivals, parades, fireworks shows, shopping and dining in each of the cities starting the day after Thanksgiving through the New Year.

One of the most iconic festivals along the Louisiana Holiday Trail of Lights is the Natchitoches Christmas Festival, also called the "Festival of Lights," in Natchitoches. It was started in 1927, making it one of the oldest light festivals in the US. In the largest north Louisiana city on the Trail, Shreveport offer Christmas in Roseland at the American Rose Center, Rockets Over the Red Fireworks, Christmas on Caddo Fireworks, nightly blizzards at the Louisiana Boardwalk Outlets and other events. Minden's big holiday celebration is Fasching. Alexandria/Pineville offers WinterFete and Monroe-West Monroe is known for Antique Alley shopping.

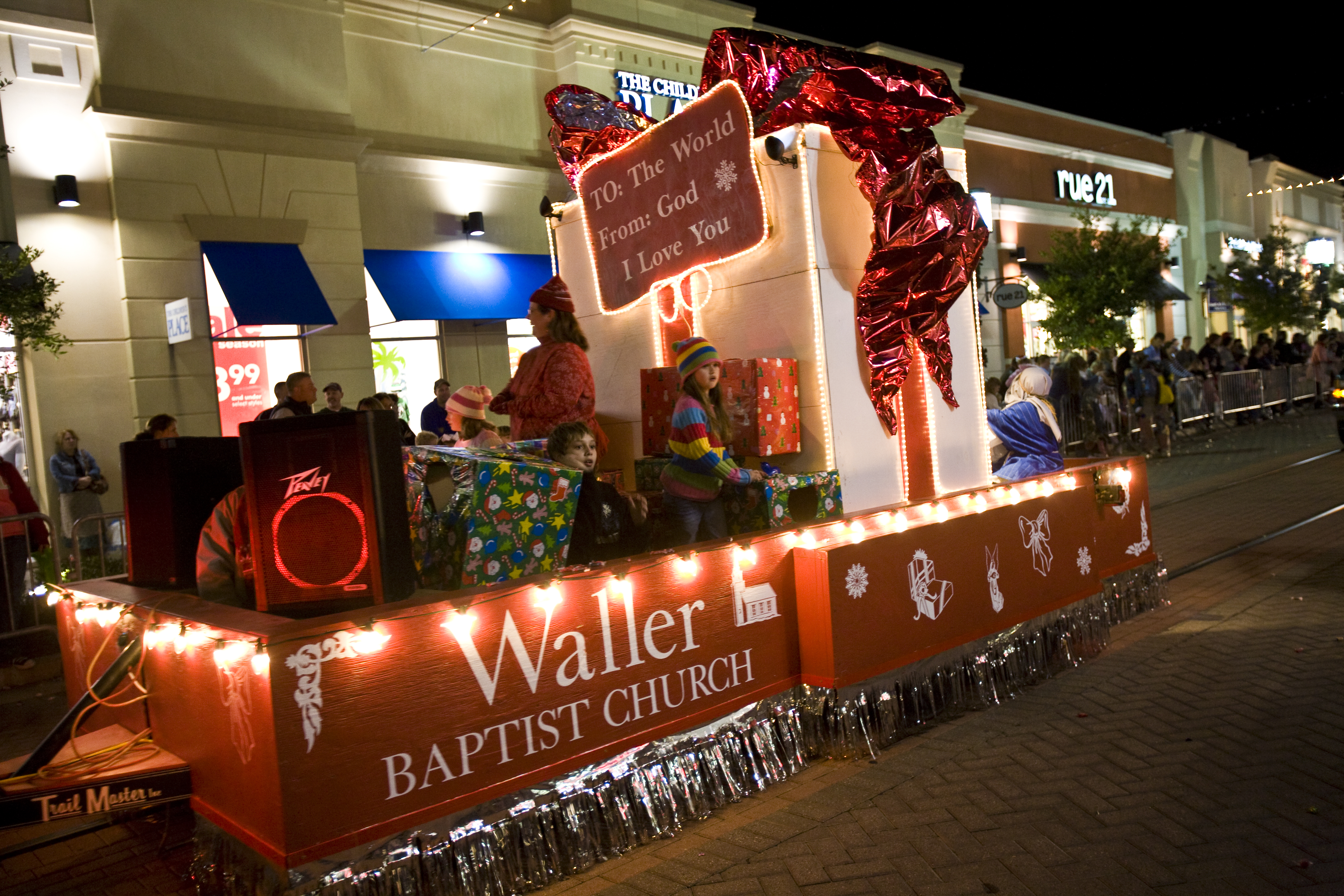
Each year the public is invited to a Christmas parade to celebrate the holidays at the Louisiana Boardwalk Outlets in Bossier City, LA.

All of the cities are within a one-hour drive of each other on Interstates 20 and 49.
