= Yambilee Festival =

Official Louisiana Yambilee Logo

The Yambilee Festival was a festival that was held annually in Opelousas, Louisiana, United States. The Yambilee Festival started on the Wednesday of the last full weekend of October and continued throughout the weekend.

The Yambilee was founded by two friends, native Texan J.W. "Bill" Low and Felix Dezauche, a yam shipper and processor as a way to honor the local sweet potato industry. According to J.W. Low, the raison d'être of the festival was to "assist and encourage the advancement of the material prosperity and progress of the State of Louisiana, Southwest Louisiana and St. Landry Parish by stimulating local and national interest in Louisiana farm produce, particularly Louisiana Sweet potatoes (yams) and to provide colorful programs of entertainment capable of generating nationwide publicity and advertising for Louisiana yams and other farm produce."

The first Louisiana Yambilee celebration, held October 9 and 10, 1946, was organized by the first board of directors whose members included: J.W. Low, J.F. Dezauche, Anthony Chachere, Charles Bourque, Lee Mizzi, J.P. Barnett, Arnold Winsberg, J.M. Landry, A.B. Reed, Allen Dezauche, John Thistlewaite, Alex Watkins and Seth Lewis not to mention Opelousas Chamber of Commerce, city, parish and state officials, local organizations and countless volunteers.

The first Louisiana Yambilee festival queen was Jean Horecky of Church Point. There were two Co-Mr. Yams, Jack Herbert and Alfred Lagrange, both from Opelousas. The festival would crown its first king, R.J. Castille of Sunset, during the second festival.

In 1956, then Senator John F Kennedy rode in the parade with three congress members: Hall Boggs of New Orleans, Edwin E. Willis of St. Martinville and T. Ashton Thompson of Ville Platte. Upon arrival at the airport in Opelousas, Willis presented Kennedy with a Yambilee tie.

In 2012, the Yambilee Festival was discontinued due to both lack of funding and extreme lack of public support.
