= Buffalo Seminary =

Girls' school in Buffalo, New York, US

Coordinates: 42°55′28.041″N 78°52′30.04″W

The Buffalo Seminary
- 205 Bidwell Parkway, Buffalo, NY; US

Information
- Type: private, all-girls
- Established: 1851
- Songs: Alma Mater and Jerusalem
- Head of School: Blair Parker
- Enrollment: 188
- Colors: Red and White
- Mascot: Red-Tailed Hawk
- Website: www.buffaloseminary.org
- Buffalo Seminary
- U.S. National Register of Historic Places
- U.S. Historic district – Contributing property
- Location within New York
- Location: 205 Bidwell Pkwy., Buffalo, New York
- Area: 0.7 acres (0.28 ha)
- Built: 1909
- Architect: George F. Newton; Bley & Lyman; Lyman, D. & Associates
- Architectural style: Late 19th And 20th Century Revivals, Collegiate Gothic
- Part of: Elmwood Historic District–East (ID16000108)
- NRHP reference No.: 11000271
- Added to NRHP: May 11, 2011

Buffalo Seminary (SEM) is an independent, private, college preparatory day and boarding school for girls in Buffalo, New York.

== Accreditations and memberships ==
SEM is an accredited member of the National Association of Independent Schools, the New York State Association of Independent Schools, The Association of Boarding Schools, the Small Boarding School Association, the National Coalition of Girls' Schools, and Online School for Girls. As an independent school, SEM is not confined by the guidelines established by the New York State Board of Regents. SEM is a Committed Steinway Select School.

== History ==
Founded in 1851, SEM is the sixth oldest school for girls in the United States and the second oldest in New York state. The school was originally named The Buffalo Female Academy and has maintained an all-female student body. Its original mission was to provide an exceptional education for young women, to prepare them to engage productively with the world. Originally, it offered education for young girls from kindergarten through sophomore year in college and had boarding. In 1889, the school adopted its current name, Buffalo Seminary.

Graduates of SEM founded the Twentieth Century Club in the late 1800s. one of the oldest private women's clubs in the United States, which is on the National Register of Historic Places.

The school changed its policy in 1899 to teach only grades 9 through 12 after merging with the Elmwood School. In 1908, the school moved from its initial founding address on Johnson Park to the current address on Bidwell Parkway, and was listed on the National Register of Historic Places in 2011. In 2008 SEM reestablished boarding which has expanded into a campus of five renovated historic homes next to the school building. Since adding the residential program, American girls and girls from all over the world have lived and learned at SEM.

== Facilities ==
SEM's school building is located at 205 Bidwell Parkway. It was designed by Boston architect George F. Newton and built in 1908 in the Tudor Revival style. SEM's campus includes five historic homes renovated for faculty and student residences, and Larkin Field where SEM's Red-Tailed Hawks play soccer, lacrosse, and field hockey.

SEM launched a capital campaign "Remarkable Opportunities - Campaign for SEM" in the spring of 2015 which when it closed June 30, 2016, with gift commitments of $9.2 million, surpassing its goal of $8.5 million. One of the campaign's goals was to build the Magavern-Sutton Courtyard to connect the five SEM student and faculty houses with the school building. The private courtyard opened for the 2016-17 school year. It is located in the Elmwood Historic District–East.

== Sports ==
The 14 teams at Buffalo Seminary - Red-Tailed Hawks - are part of the Monsignor Martin High School Athletic Association (MMHSA) for a number of sports, NYSAIS (field hockey), ISSA (sailing), BSRA and US Squash (squash). The students compete with other schools in the MMHSAA as well as other local and regional high schools in various sports. The school offers three seasons of sports in which the girls may participate at the Varsity team level: crew, cross country, basketball, bowling (varsity and junior varsity), fencing, field hockey, golf, lacrosse, indoor track, sailing, swimming, squash, and tennis.

The teams are named the Red-Tailed Hawks for a bird commonly spotted in Western New York, and soaring over the school's field.

== Traditions ==
Each student, faculty and staff member signs an honor code at the beginning of the school year. "I pledge my honor that I have neither given nor received assistance," is written and signed by students on all class tests, papers, examinations, and other work which a faculty member designates as an honor assignment.

Harkness Learning: SEM has six Harkness classrooms used primarily by the English and history departments. These classrooms are centered on a Harkness table - a large, wood, oval table where which students gather around to learn collaboratively. At a Harkness table teachers facilitate and mediate topics and discussion, no student is not seen, and everyone has the duty and opportunity to speak.

Morning Meeting: Every morning the entire school assembles for "morning meeting." While other high schools may begin their day with an assigned homeroom for students, at SEM, all students gather in the chapel first. Morning meeting is led by the president of the School Government Association. Throughout the year, senior class students make formal presentations at morning meeting.

All-Girl Theatre Productions: Girls play all the parts in SEM's two main theatrical productions (fall and spring) and they work as the production, lighting, and costume crews.

Graduation: SEM graduates its seniors at Westminster Presbyterian Church.

== Notable alumnae ==
- Isabella Bannerman, cartoonist
- Lauren Belfer, author
- Elizabeth Coatsworth, poet
- Barbara Culliton, journalist and editor
- Marian de Forest, journalist
- Virginia Horvath, 1975, chancellor of SUNY Fredonia
- Amy Holden Jones, screenwriter and director
- Nicole C. Lee, 1994, lawyer
- Elizabeth Swados, playwright
- Helen Tretbar, author and editor
- Tara Vanderveer, basketball coach
- Nan Watson, artist
- Kimberly L. Wehle, law professor
- Jane Meade Welch, journalist and lecturer

== See also ==
- Female seminary
- Nichols School
- Nardin Academy
- The Park School of Buffalo

== Gallery ==
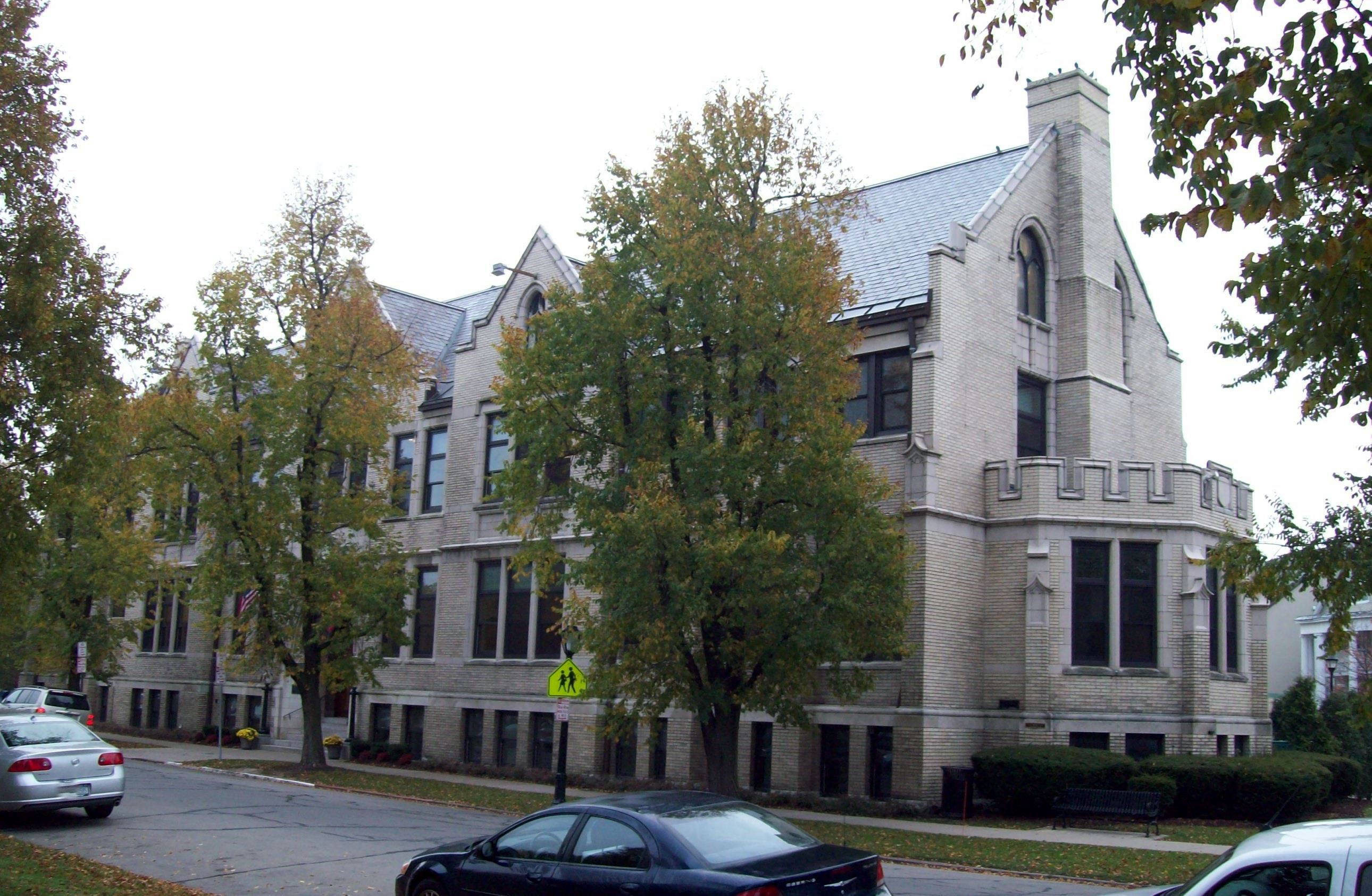
Buffalo Seminary, November 2010

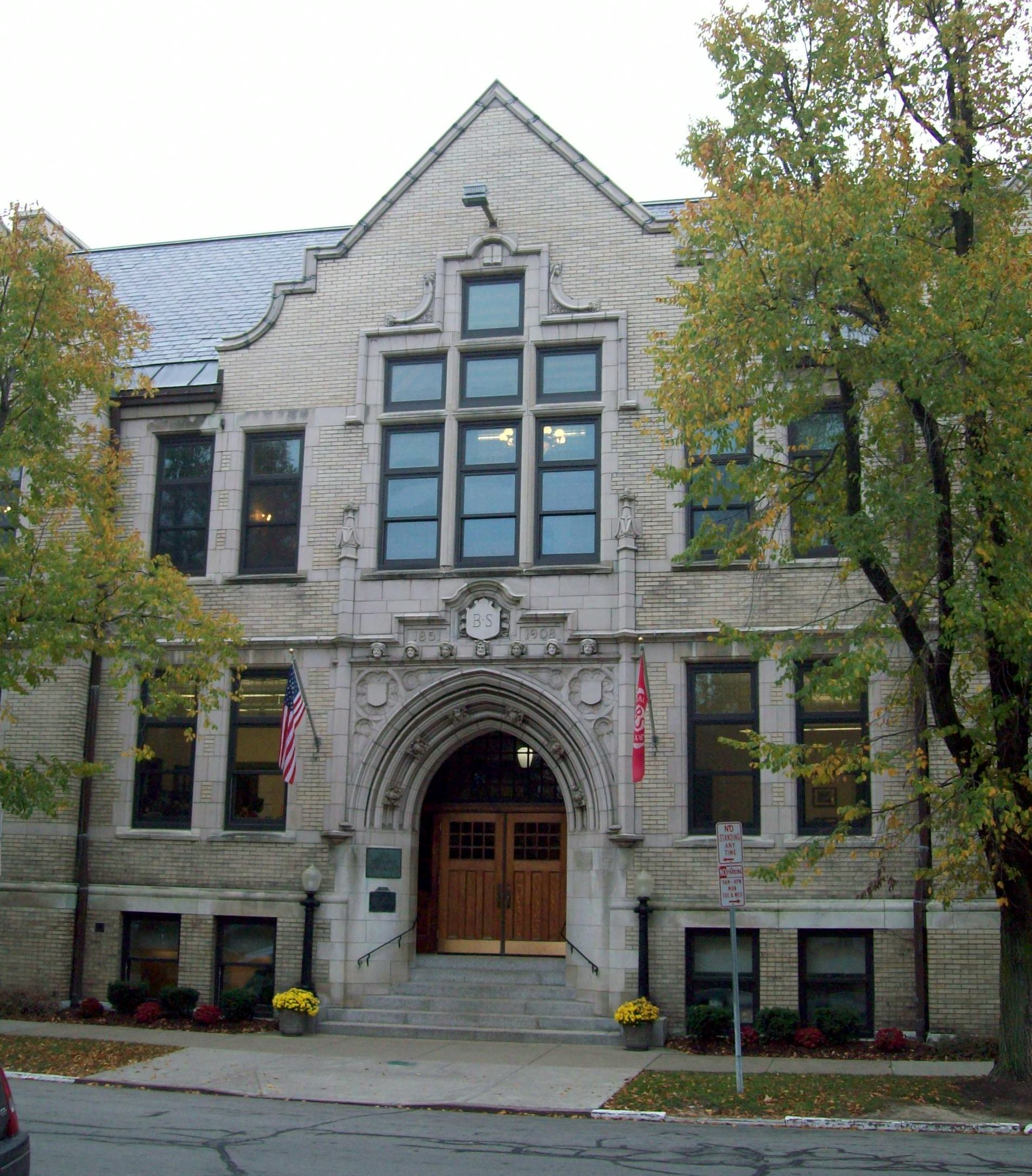
Entry details, November 2010

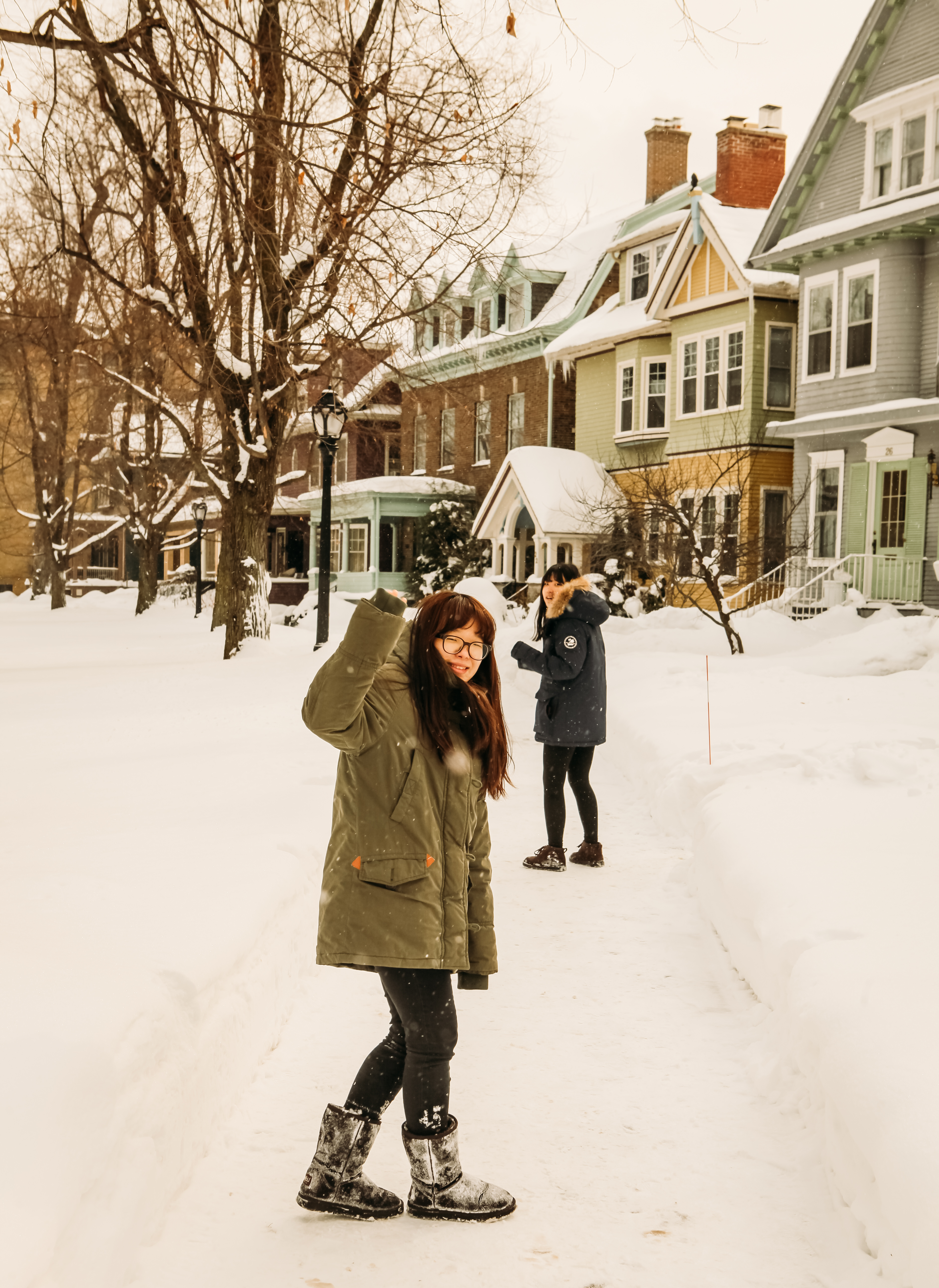
On the path between the student residences and the school

== See also ==
- National Register of Historic Places listings in Buffalo, New York
