= The City of Light (novel) =

1924 novel by Mieczysław Smolarski

Miasto światłości The City of Light
- Author: Mieczysław Smolarski
- Language: Polish
- Genre: Science fiction, dystopian fiction
- Published: 1924 (Święty Wojciech Dom Medialny)
- Publication place: Poland

Miasto światłości (The City of Light) is a novel written in 1924 by Mieczysław Smolarski.

The novel entwines the genres of dystopia and catastrophism. It relays the end of the world by two natural disasters, the first of which destroys all civilisation, whilst the second destroys the whole of planet Earth, instigated by the complicity of its own inhabitants. The dystopic literary work warns against imperialism and barbarism as well as uncontrolled technological advancement. The novel's themes include antimilitarism and pacifism, which were both prevalent in the interwar period World War I following.

Novels similar to and inspired by The City of Light and Smolarski's other literary works, namely Podróż poślubna Pana Hamiltona (The Honeymoon Trip of Mr. Hamilton, 1928), include Aldous Huxley's Brave New World, published in 1932. Smolarski argued Huxley plagiarised his work, but Huxley never addressed these claims. In 1982, claims of plagiarism against Huxley were supported by Polish literary historian Antoni Smuszkiewicz in his book Zaczarowana gra.

== See also ==
- 1924 in literature
- History of Poland (1918–1939)
- Polish speculative fiction
- The Dream (novel)
