= The Northshore Regional Endowment For The Arts =

The Northshore Regional Endowment For The Arts (NREA) is a non-profit organization in Louisiana, USA that offers opportunities in music and art education for local youth, and promotes local artists and musicians through a number of programs. The organization has hosted an annual music and arts festival, the Strawberry Jam'n Toast To The Arts since 2001. In 2008 the endowment started the JamFest Indie Film Festival. It also works with schools to provide music education to local students, and assists local artists and musicians in promotion and marketing.

== History ==
The Endowment was formed in June 2001 by Ted J. Hudspeth, Sr., MD, a family practice physician at Ochsner Clinic Foundation in Hammond, Louisiana. The NREA was formed soon after the first Strawberry Jam'n Toast to the Arts Festival.

== Festivals ==
=== Jam'n toast festival ===
The Strawberry Jam'n Toast To The Arts Festival is a music and art festival held each year by the Northshore Endowment since 2001. Entry to the festival is a small donation and proceeds of the festival go toward funding other programs in the Northshore Regional Endowment for the Arts.

In 2001, working with the Ponchatoula Chamber of Commerce, NREA founder Ted Hudspeth held the first festival, which hosted 40 bands and performers on 6 different stages and 26 artists on the streets of downtown Ponchatoula. The 2010 festival was held in Hammond, Louisiana.

Festival performances include rock, easy listening and gospel groups, as well as dance and drama groups, artist demonstrations and craft booths, and a children's art tent.

=== JamFest independent film festival ===
Founded in 2008, and held annually each September in Hammond, Louisiana, JamFest Indie Film Festival began as a regional film event that sought to inspire local independent filmmakers with limited funds. Now expanding to include national and international independent filmmakers, JamFest seeks to recognize film excellence internationally. All proceeds from the event first go towards filmmaker awards. The remaining funds are directed into the Northshore Regional Endowment for the Arts.

== School programs ==
Working with the Community Music School at Southeastern Louisiana University under the direction of Dr. Thais Perkins, in 2004 the Endowment sponsored a direct teaching project. A music educator went to 3 different parish schools to instruct students on stringed instruments. This included teaching the differences between various musical styles that the stringed instruments can be used in. The lessons were capped off by performances in the schools by string musicians.

The NREA sponsors the enrollment of 5th graders in the Ponchatoula school district in the Recorder Music Program at Ponchatoula Jr. High School. It supplies recorders, CD's and music for the students to take a semester of music with the music educator.

The Endowment provided the seed money for the Kim Howes Zabbia Art Education Endowment, which will be invested in the art education classes in the Ponchatoula School District at the High School and Junior High School levels.

The Northshore Endowment has supported a number of other smaller local projects:

- Purchased computer for the 'talented and gifted' art program and paid for art supplies used in the program that serves 10 public schools in Tangipahoa Parish.
- Sends multiple students with financial needs to the SLU young musician's summer camp each summer.
- Financed SLU Community Music School Grade School Outreach Programs in the region (this program put music teaching programs in Hammond Westside school for 2 years).
- Financed Student with financial need to attend the 'Talented and Gifted Algoma Music Camp' in Canada.
- Provided funding for Ponchatoula Junior High Band for Flip Folders.
- Provided funding for Ponchatoula's Tucker Elementary School to purchase musical instruments and teaching supplies to teach classroom music.

== Other programs and work ==
Between 2008/09 the NREA donated more than $15,000 to Hammond area schools' fine arts programs, including donations of recorders and books to more than 1,270 students.

The Northshore Regional Endowment for the Arts has supported scholarships for the Southeastern Community Music School's summer program, the Southeastern Music Festival. It has also financed recording and production of multiple compilation CD's featuring local musicians. It financed the Songwriter/Song Publishing Educational Workshop for local musicians with a Nashville Songwriter/Publisher.

The NREA funds the Lifetime Achievement Award given to honor local musicians and artists that have done big things with their art. Recipients have included: Hank Jones, Clarence Gatemouth Brown, Irma Thomas, Julia Sims, Carmel Foret, Reginald Sanders, Bill Hemmerling, and Kim Howes Zabbia.

== NREA board ==
Becky Eymard, OT
James Bass
Diana Buras, LPN
Ruth Rolling
Douglas Brown
Mary Hudspeth, RPh
Patty Hubert
Ted J. Hudspeth, MD
