= Alligator Festival =

Coordinates: 29.93654°N 90.37801°W

- Dates: September
- Location: Luling, Louisiana
- Years active: 1979–2004, 2006–2019, 2021–
- Founded: 1979
- Attendance: 20,000-25,000
- Website: www.alligatorfestival.org

The Alligator Festival is an annual event held during the last weekend of September in Luling, Louisiana. It is held at the St. Charles Parish West Bank Bridge Park under the Hale Boggs Bridge.

The Alligator Festival has musical acts that perform at the fair. Vendors sell food and range of items such as toys, candles, clothes and jewelry. The food offerings include items such as jambalaya, pastalaya, fried and grilled alligator, funnel cakes, hamburgers, French fries, hot dogs plus other local, homemade dishes.

The Alligator Festival is sponsored by the Rotary Club of St. Charles Parish and they collect donations to make the festival possible. The money raised is used to help St. Charles Parish give scholarships to St. Charles Parish Public School System students and build freshwater wells in foreign countries.

== History ==
The first Alligator Festival was held in 1979 at the Willowdale Country Club in Luling, Louisiana. The first festival offered only alligator dishes, but a wider variety of food and activities were offered in subsequent years. The festival was cancelled in 2005 due to Hurricane Katrina, and again in 2020 due to the COVID-19 pandemic.
