= Natchitoches Christmas Festival =

Annual event in Natchitoches, Louisiana

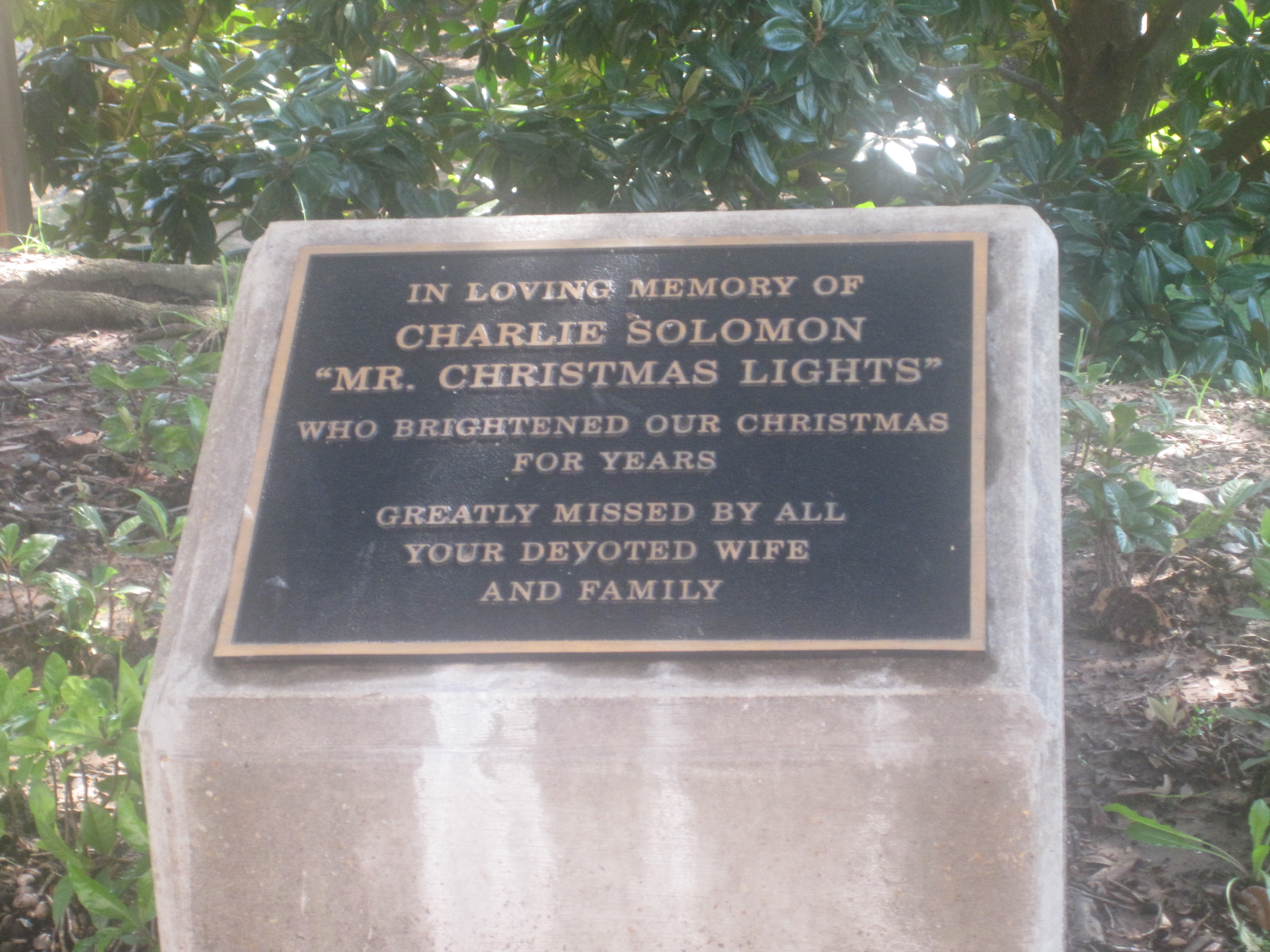
Though many civic leaders have promoted the Christmas Festival, there is a monument on the riverwalk to Charles P. "Charlie" Solomon (1907-1995), called "Mr. Christmas Lights" in Natchitoches, Louisiana

The Natchitoches Christmas Festival (Festival of Lights) is held annually in Natchitoches, Louisiana on the first weekend in December.

== History ==
The Christmas festival is expanded throughout the community each year but is centered on the historic district of Natchitoches. The festival is a major tourist attraction for the area, drawing an estimated 100,000 visitors annually. It can be difficult to find a hotel, pushing many visitors into neighboring cities such as Winnfield and Alexandria. Hotel prices can often jump into the hundreds for those who failed to make reservations. Front street, Jefferson, and Second Street constitute the main route of the Christmas Parade. The festival has been held the first Saturday in December since 1927, except 1941–44.

The official premiere of the festival occurs on the first Saturday of December. Events include an early afternoon parade, an arts & crafts show, food booths along the river front selling Louisiana cuisine, including the famous Natchitoches meat pie, live entertainment, and a spectacular evening fireworks show accompanied with music and a laser show. At the end of the fireworks display (the best in the state of Louisiana), the lights along Cane River are switched on – a display of 300,000+ lights and 100+ riverbank set pieces. The lights continue to brighten the Cane River until after New Year's Day.

Country music singer Frank Foster was the grand marshal for 2013, appearing in the parade and giving a performance on December 7, along with the Northwestern State University Marching Band, several high school marching bands, dance teams from around Louisiana, the winners of local beauty pageants including Miss Merry Christmas and the Christmas Belles, and, of course, Santa Claus. Schools as far away as Beaumont, Texas, have been known to send their marching bands to participate in the parade.

The Natchitoches Christmas Festival has appeared in several films, including Steel Magnolias, set in Natchitoches.

It is also a part of the Holiday Trail of Lights.
