= USS Mayflower =

USS Mayflower has been the name of more than one United States Navy ship:

- USS Mayflower (1866), a screw tug built in 1866, in commission from 1866 to 1872 and from 1874 to 1892
- USS Mayflower (PY-1), a patrol yacht built in 1896, in commissioned from 1898 to 1904 and from 1905 to 1929, later serving in the Navy from 1942 to 1943 as USS Butte
- USS Mayflower (1897), a United States Lighthouse Service lighthouse tender built in 1897 that served in the Navy as the auxiliary cruiser USS Suwannee from April to December 1898 and as the patrol vessel USS Mayflower from 1917 to 1919

== See also ==
- Mayflower (ship)
- USCGC Mayflower
- Mayflower (disambiguation)
