= Mayflower (disambiguation) =

Mayflower was the ship that transported the Pilgrims from Plymouth to the New World in 1620.

Mayflower may also refer to:

== Literature ==
- Mayflower (series), an unfinished book trilogy by Orson Scott Card and Kathryn H. Kidd
- Mayflower: A Story of Courage, Community, and War, a 2006 book by Nathaniel Philbrick

== Places ==
- Mayflower, Arkansas
- Mayflower Village, California
- Mayflower, Missouri
- Mayflower, Virginia

== Plants ==
- Cardamine pratensis, mayflower or cuckoo-flower
- Epigaea repens, mayflower or trailing arbutus
- Maianthemum canadense, Canada mayflower or false lily-of-the-valley
- Delonix regia tree, known as Gulmohar or May-flower tree in India
- Crataegus, hawthorn, quickthorn, thornapple, May-tree, whitethorn, or hawberry
  - Crataegus monogyna, the common hawthorn or may
- Laelia speciosa, Mayflower orchid
- Cattleya trianae, Flor de Mayo ('May flower') or Christmas orchid

== Rail transportation ==
- Mayflower (passenger train), an English train service from Kingswear to London Paddington
- LNER Thompson Class B1 61306 or Mayflower, a preserved steam locomotive
- Mayflower line, a railway line from Manningtree to Harwich in Essex, England
- Mayflower MRT station, a station in Singapore

== Schools ==
- Mayflower School, a school in Ikenne, Ogun State, Nigeria
- Mayflower Secondary School, a school in Ang Mo Kio, Singapore
- Mayflower High School, a school in Billericay, Essex, England
- Mayflower Primary School, Poplar, a school in London, England
- Mayflower School (Juneau, Alaska)
- Mayflower High School (Arkansas)
  - Mayflower School District

== Ships ==
- List of ships named Mayflower

== Other uses ==
- Mayflower: The Pilgrims' Adventure, a 1979 American TV film
- Triumph Mayflower, a British car
- Mayflower Hotel, a hotel in Washington, D.C.
- Mayflower incident, a 2008 grenade attack in Belize
- Mayflower Mall, a mall in Sydney, Nova Scotia, Canada
- Mayflower Pictures, a former British film production company
- Mayflower Productions, a former British-based film production company
- Mayflower Theatre, a theatre in Southampton, England
- Mayflower Transit, an American moving company

== See also ==
- Sydney Biddle Barrows, an American businesswoman and escort agency owner, later known as the Mayflower Madam
- Majblomma ('Mayflower'), a traditional Swedish charity pin
- Mayflower Compact, the first governing document of Plymouth Colony
  - Mayflower Compact signatories
