= USCGC Mayflower =

USCGC Mayflower may refer to more than one United States Coast Guard ship:

- USCGC Mayflower (WAGL-236), a lighthouse tender which served in the United States Lighthouse Service as USLHT Mayflower from 1897 to 1898, from 1898 to 1917, and from 1919 to 1939, and in the U.S. Coast Guard in 1939 and from 1940 to 1945 as USCGC Mayflower; renamed USCGC Hydrangea in 1943
- USCGC Mayflower (WPE-183), a patrol vessel that served in the U.S. Coast Guard from 1943 to 1946

== See also ==
- Mayflower (ship)
- USS Mayflower
