= List of ships named Mayflower =

Mayflower is the name of many ships. Notable ones include:

- Mayflower was the ship that transported the Pilgrims from Plymouth to the New World (America) in 1620
  - Mayflower, a second ship of the same name that made the voyage several times including as part of the Winthrop Fleet in 1630
  - Mayflower II, a replica of the Mayflower that transported the Pilgrims from Plymouth in 1620, built in Devon, England, during 1955–1956
- Mayflower (tugboat), a steam tug of 1861, preserved at Bristol in the United Kingdom
- PS Mayflower (1866), a paddle steamer
- Mayflower (yacht), an 1886 America's Cup yacht
- Mayflower, a man-o-war of the English navy which sank on the Seven Stones Reef in March 1656
- Mayflower, a paddle steamer carrying passengers between New Orleans and St. Louis, in the mid-nineteenth century
- Mayflower (shipwreck), a wooden-hulled scow schooner that sank in 1891. The shipwreck site is on the National Register of Historic Places
- Mayflower (Canadian ship), a flat-bottom steamer that sank on Kamaniskeg Lake in 1912
- HMCS Mayflower, a World War II corvette of the Royal Canadian Navy
- *Mayflower AI sea drone, an autonomous research vessel planned to cross the Atlantic without human assistance in 2021 to retrace the original Mayflower's route
- Mayflower of Liberia, which sailed from New York in 1820 to found Liberia
- USCGC Mayflower, more than one United States Coast Guard ship
- USLHT Mayflower (1897), a lighthouse tender in the United States Lighthouse Service
- USS Mayflower, more than one United States Navy ship

== See also ==
- Harwich Mayflower Heritage Centre, a museum with a full-scale replica of the 1620 Mayflower
- Mayflower (disambiguation)
