= USLHT Arbutus (1933 ship) =

US Lighthouse Tender

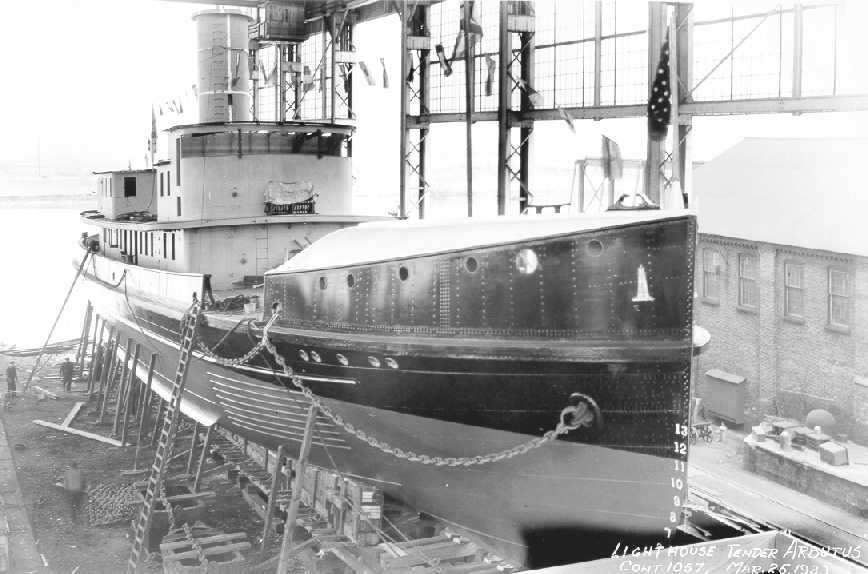
- USLHT Arbutus in 1933 just before her launch

History

United States
- Name: USLHT Arbutus
- Operator: United States Lighthouse Service
- Builder: Pusey and Jones Corporation
- Cost: $239,800
- Launched: 25 March 1933
- Identification: Signal Letters: WWEA
- Fate: Transferred to US Coast Guard

United States
- Name: USCGC Arbutus
- Operator: United States Coast Guard
- Acquired: 1 July 1939
- Decommissioned: 10 January 1967
- Identification: Signal letters: NRWD
- Fate: Sold to Marine Explorations Company

unknown registration
- Name: Arbutus
- Operator: Marine Explorations Co. 1969-1976?; Treasure Salvors 1976?-1983
- Fate: Sank at anchor in 1983

General characteristics as built in 1933
- Displacement: 997 tons fully loaded
- Length: 174 ft 7 in (53.21 m)
- Beam: 33 ft (10 m)
- Draft: 12 ft 3 in (3.73 m)
- Depth of hold: 14 ft 6 in (4.42 m)
- Installed power: 2x 500 horsepower steam engines

USLHT Arbutus was built as a lighthouse tender for the Massachusetts coast. She served in that role from her launch in 1933 until World War II. In 1939, the Lighthouse Service was merged into the United States Coast Guard and the ship became USCGC Arbutus. During the war she was under United States Navy control. She served as an anti-submarine net-tender at Newport, Rhode Island. After the war she was posted to New York and resumed her buoy tender responsibilities. She was decommissioned in 1967 and sold in 1969.

After her government service, Arbutus was used in a number of treasure hunting expeditions in Haiti and Florida, most notably, Mel Fisher's salvage of the Spanish galleon Nuestra Señora de Atocha. In 1983 she sank at anchor while engaged at that site.

== Construction and characteristics ==
In 1931, the Commissioner of Lighthouses requested funding to replace USLHT Azalea, which was then beyond economical repair. Although Arbutus was originally planned to replace USLHT Ilex, she was assigned to replace Azalea. Pusey and Jones Corporation of Wilmington, Delaware was the low bidder and won the contract to build Arbutus for $239,800. Contracts for the ship were signed on 14 July 1932.

Arbutus was launched on 25 March 1933. Her sponsor was Elizabeth Duncan Putnam, daughter of Commissioner of Lighthouses George R. Putnam. Among the guests at the ceremony were Commissioner Putnam, Delaware Governor C. Douglas Buck, and U.S. Secretary of Commerce Daniel C. Roper. A luncheon for the visiting officials was held after the launch at the DuPont Biltmore Hotel in Wilmington.

Arbutus' sea trial took place on 5 June 1933 on the Delaware River. As a result of the successful trial, the ship was accepted by the Lighthouse Service on 6 June 1933.

Her hull was built of mild steel plates, riveted together. The ship was 174 feet 7 inches (53.21 m) long overall, with a beam of 33 feet (10 m), a depth of hold of 14.5 feet (4.4 m), and a draft of 12 feet 3 inches (3.73 m). She displaced 997 tons, fully loaded.

Arbutus was driven by two propellers. Power was provided by two triple-expansion steam engines. Each engine generated 500 horsepower at 150 RPM. The ship was capable of reaching a maximum speed of 11.3 knots. Steam for the engines was produced by two oil-fired boilers which had a working pressure of 200 pounds per square inch. The engines were built by Pusey and Jones.

The ship was equipped with a steel mast and boom that served as a derrick to lift buoys and other loads on and off the ship. A separate steam engine and winch gave the derrick the ability to hoist loads of up to 20 tons.

The covered forecastle on the main deck housed the crew washrooms and toilets, and stowage for deck equipment. Crew quarters were on the lower deck forward, and petty officers' quarters were on the lower deck aft. The steel main deck house held the galley, pantry, crew's mess, and officers' staterooms and dining room. Above the main deck house forward were the pilot house, ship's office, and adjoining captain's cabin, and washroom. The upper deck aft contained the radio room, and a stateroom, washroom, and dining room for the Lighthouse District Superintendent, as well as an extra stateroom.

Lighthouse tenders were named for trees and shrubs. Arbutus is a genus of flowering plants in the heather family. The Arbutus launched in 1933 was the third vessel of that name to serve as a lighthouse tender. The second USLHT Arbutus was launched in 1879.

== U.S. Lighthouse Service (1933–1939) ==
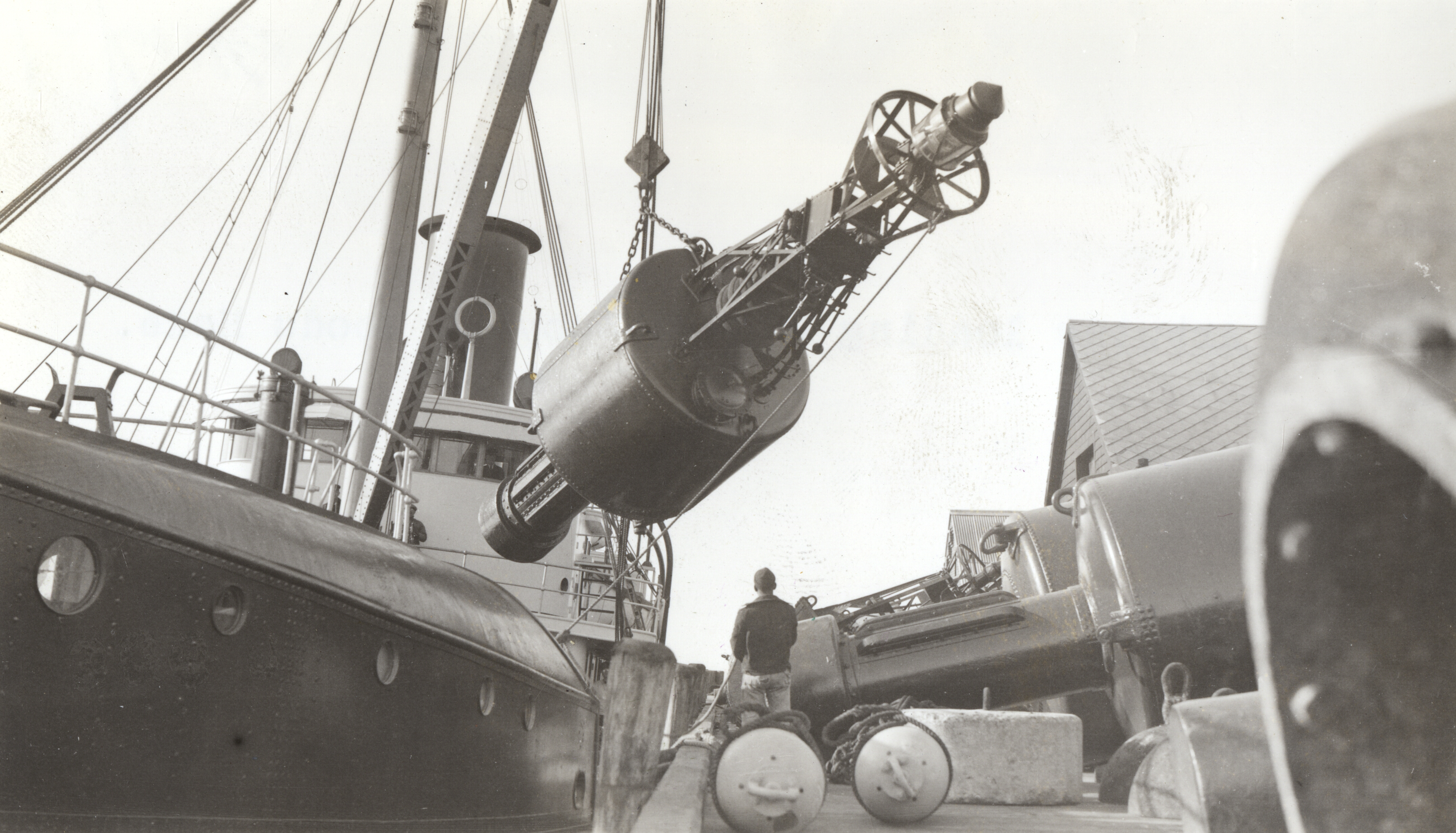
USLHT Arbutus loading buoys at Woods Hole in May 1937

Arbutus was assigned to the 2nd Lighthouse District which encompassed the coast of Massachusetts and Rhode Island. Her home port was New Bedford, Massachusetts. She began her work there in July 1933 delivering supplies to the lighthouse at Bristol, Rhode Island.

Buoys are moved by storms and ice, break loose from their anchors, are hit by passing ships, rust, and worn by the weather. They require periodic maintenance, and this was one of Arbutus's main missions. Her buoy tending chores were complicated by winter sea ice along the New England coast. Ice would damage or sink large iron buoys, so every fall Arbutus would replace threatened nuns, cans, and bell buoys with wooden spar buoys. In the spring she would have to reverse the process and put all the metal buoys back in place. Arbutus also placed temporary buoys around wrecks while preparations were made to remove them.

Many lighthouses and all lightships were supplied by sea, since their remote locations offered no land transportation. Arbutus performed this task through her entire career, delivering mail, food, water, and other supplies.

While some lightships of this era were capable of self-propulsion, many were towed to and from their stations. For example, in 1934 Arbutus towed to port for maintenance Relief Light Vessel No. 49 from its station in Buzzard's Bay. In December 1935 Arbutus towed Boston Light Vessel No. 54 to drydock in Quincy after she was hit and almost sunk by the freighter Seven Seas Spray.

== U.S. Coast Guard (1939–1969) ==
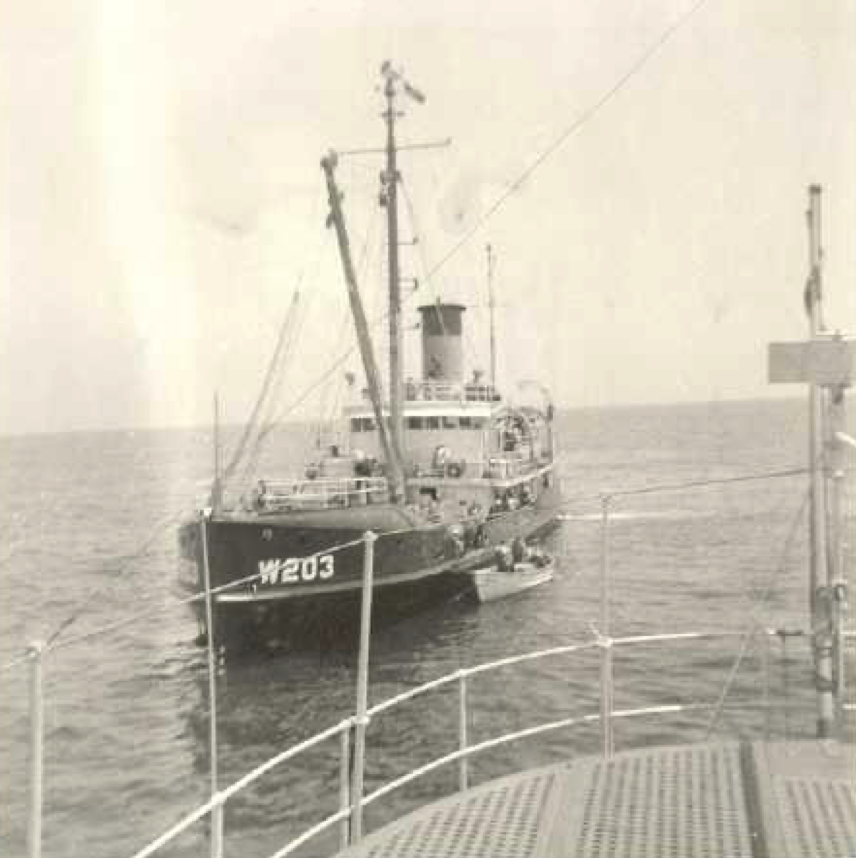
USCGC Arbutus supplying Scotland lightship in 1958

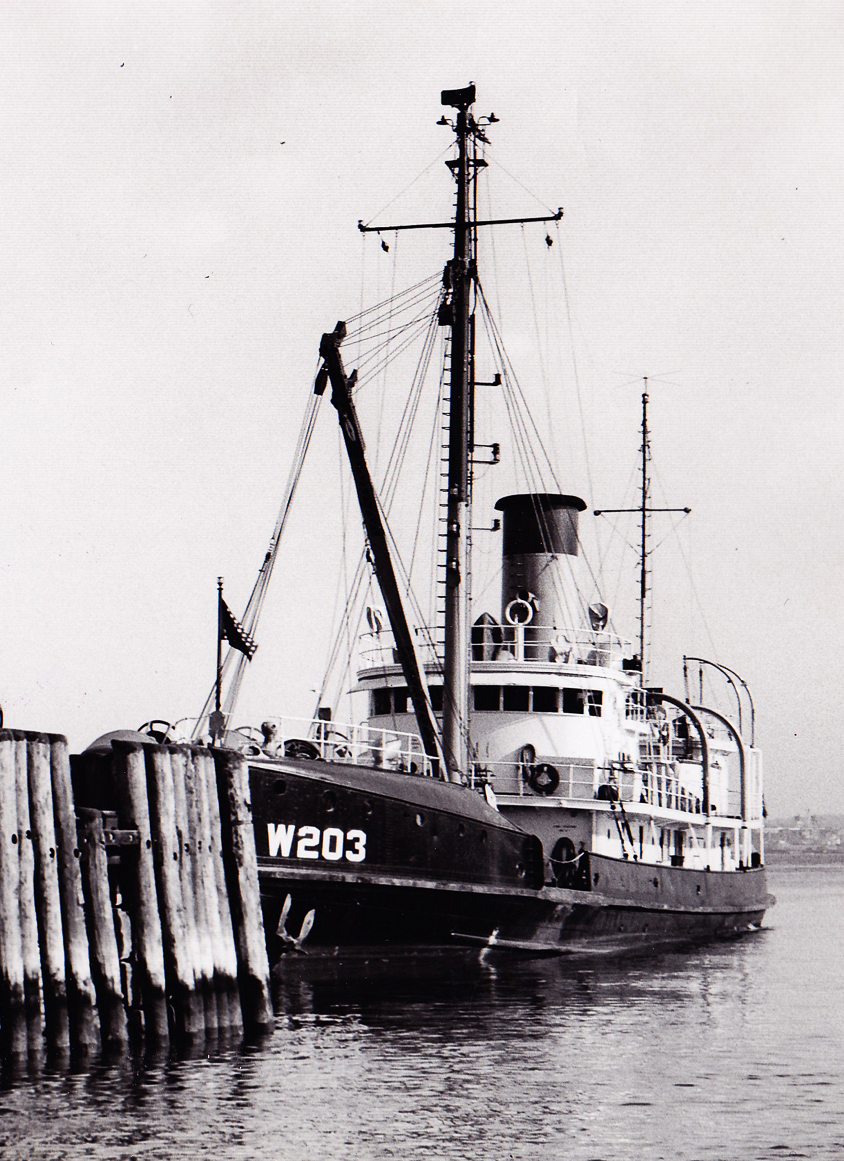
USCGC Arbutus moored at Staten Island, circa 1965

The Lighthouse Service merged into the United States Coast Guard on 1 July 1939. The tender became USCGC Arbutus (WAGL-203). She was assigned to the Boston Coast Guard District which was responsible for the coast of New England from Maine through portions of Rhode Island. Her crew underwent a transition from civilian to military service. Arbutus was based at Woods Hole, Massachusetts.

During World War II Arbutus was fitted with one 3"/23 gun and two 20mm/80 cannons. During the war her complement included 1 officer, 3 warrant officers, and 37 enlisted men. From at least 1 April 1943 to 1 July 1944 she served as part of the Net and Boom Group at Newport, Rhode Island and maintained anti-submarine nets.

After World War II, her homeport was changed to New York, and she was based at the Coast Guard station at Saint George, Staten Island. Arbutus went back to tending buoys, lighthouses, and lightships. As lighthouses were equipped with radio beacons allowing ships to determine their position by radio direction finding, buoy tenders, including Arbutus were given the new task of maintaining the calibration of the beacon transmitters. For example, on 1 August 1961, Arbutus calibrated the beacon at the Little Gull Island light.

On 1 January 1965, as part of the Coast Guard's modernization of its ship classification scheme, Arbutus was reclassified as a coastal buoy tender and given the designation WLM-203.

=== Notable events ===
Public tours of Arbutus were offered at the Staten Island Coast Guard base in 1945, 1947, 1948, and 1954.

A New York Police Department helicopter developed engine trouble on 25 February 1960 over New York Harbor. It was equipped with pontoons, so it settled onto the water. The two police officers aboard were rescued by Arbutus, which then hoisted the helicopter onto her deck.

On 8 February 1965 Eastern Airlines flight 663, a Douglas DC-7B aircraft, crashed near Jones Beach State Park shortly after taking off from John F. Kennedy International Airport. Arbutus arrived on the scene in the early afternoon of 9 February. She had two divers and sonar equipment aboard in order to locate the wreck which was in 75 feet (23 m) of water.

On 15 July 1966 she ran aground in Long Island Sound, but was refloated without damage.

=== Decommissioning and sale ===
Arbutus was decommissioned on 10 January 1967. Based on Coast Guard studies of buoy tender utilization, she was not replaced. She was sold on 28 April 1969.

== Marine Exploration Company, Inc. (1969–1976?) ==
Marine Exploration Company, Inc. of Miami purchased Arbutus with the intention of using her as a salvage platform for recovering treasure from wrecks on the north coast of Haiti. It appears that she was used in this manner in 1971. Her history thereafter becomes uncertain. At some point her engines were removed. By 1976 she was controlled by Treasure Salvors, Inc., another Florida-based treasure hunting company.

== Treasure Salvors, Inc. (1976?—1983) ==
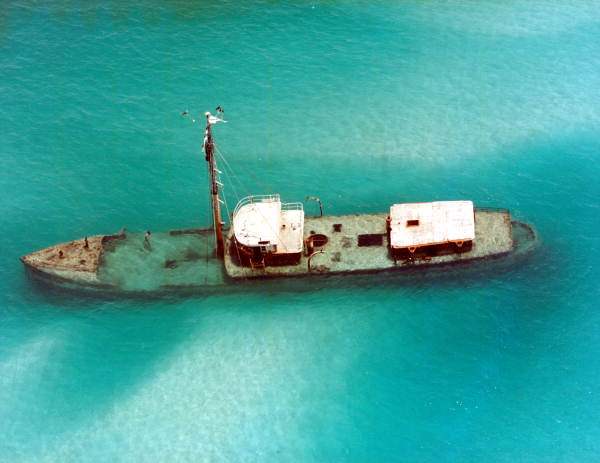
Arbutus shown where she sank in 1983

While contemporaneous press accounts reported that Arbutus was purchased by Treasure Salvors, Inc., Mel Fisher's financing of his salvage operations was notoriously complex and involved multiple corporations. It is uncertain which legal entity owned the ship and where she was registered. In any case, in 1976, Arbutus was towed to the site of the wreck of the Spanish galleon Nuestra Señora de Atocha. She was used as a work barge providing a machine shop, living quarters, and supplies for the team salvaging the wreck and as a "sentry ship" to maintain a claim to the site and to watch for poachers.

On 6 November 1977, two U.S. Marine Corps A-4 Skyhawks on a training mission mistook Arbutus for a target vessel and fired rockets at her. The rockets missed, and no harm was done to the ship.

The ship was at anchor west of Marquesas Keys in an area known as the Quicksands when she sank in 1983. She is still there, and is now a popular spot for snorkeling and fishing.

== Cultural use ==
The back cover of Jimmy Buffet's album "Songs You Know By Heart" is a photo of Buffet on the pilot house of the sunken Arbutus.
