= USLHT Azalea =

US Lighthouse Tender

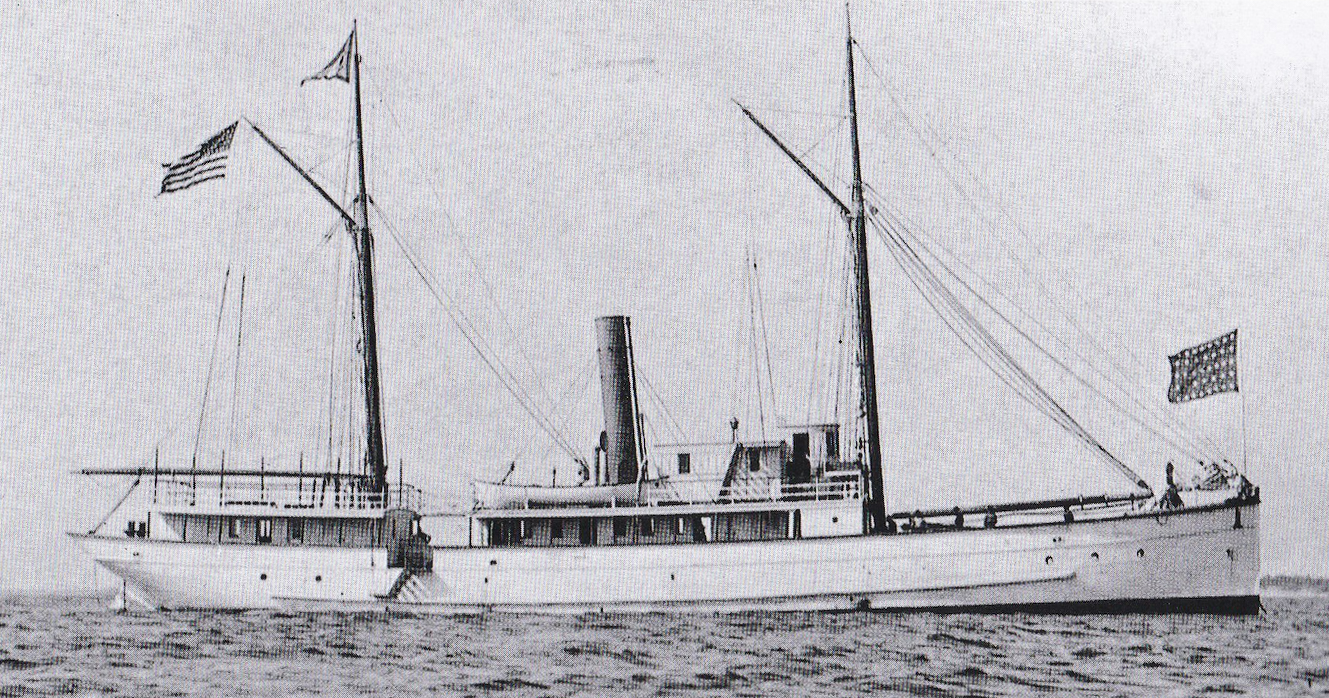
- USLHT Azalea in 1891

History

United States
- Name: USLHT Azalea
- Operator: United States Lighthouse Service
- Builder: Jonson Foundry & Machine Company
- Cost: $79,792.40
- Launched: 29 November 1890
- Identification: Signal Letters: GVNQ; Radio Call Sign: NUX
- Fate: Transferred to US Navy

United States
- Name: USS Azalea
- Operator: U.S. Navy
- Commissioned: 9 May 1917
- Fate: Transferred to U.S. Lighthouse Service

United States
- Name: USLHT Azalea
- Operator: United States Lighthouse Service
- Acquired: 1 July 1919
- Fate: Sold to Wilson Line

United States
- Name: Christiana
- Operator: Wilson Line
- Acquired: 1933
- Identification: Official Number 232860
- Fate: Sold to Bahamas Trading Company

Honduras
- Name: Christiana
- Operator: Bahamas Trading Company
- Acquired: 1940
- Fate: Sold to US Navy

United States
- Name: USS Christiana (IX-80); YAG-32 beginning November 1943
- Operator: United States Navy
- Acquired: August 1942
- Commissioned: 9 November 1942
- Decommissioned: 28 July 1945
- Identification: Radio Call Sign: NWJT
- Fate: Sold to Banana Supply Co.

Honduras
- Name: Christiana
- Operator: Banana Supply Co. 1946-1956; ? 1956-1963; United Metals and Steel Corp. 1963-1965
- Fate: Scrapped in 1965

General characteristics as built in 1891
- Displacement: 330 tons light; 516 tons fully loaded
- Length: 154 ft (47 m)
- Beam: 25 ft (7.6 m)
- Draft: 8 ft (2.4 m)
- Depth of hold: 12 ft 3 in (3.73 m)
- Installed power: 400 hp (300 kW)
- Complement: 5 officers, 19 crew (1915)

USLHT Azalea was built as a lighthouse tender and performed in that role on the Massachusetts coast from 1891 to 1917 and again from 1919 to 1933. During World War I, she served in the United States Navy as USS Azalea. Between the wars she was a commercial freighter in Chesapeake Bay, and later between Florida and The Bahamas. During World War II, she was reacquired by the U.S. Navy and served as USS Christiana, a seaplane tender which supported advanced bases in The Bahamas. Declared surplus in 1946, she was sold to Banana Supply Company, and spent a decade transporting bananas from the Caribbean to Miami. After 1956 her history is uncertain until she became a half-sunk derelict and was scrapped in Miami in 1965.

== Construction and characteristics ==
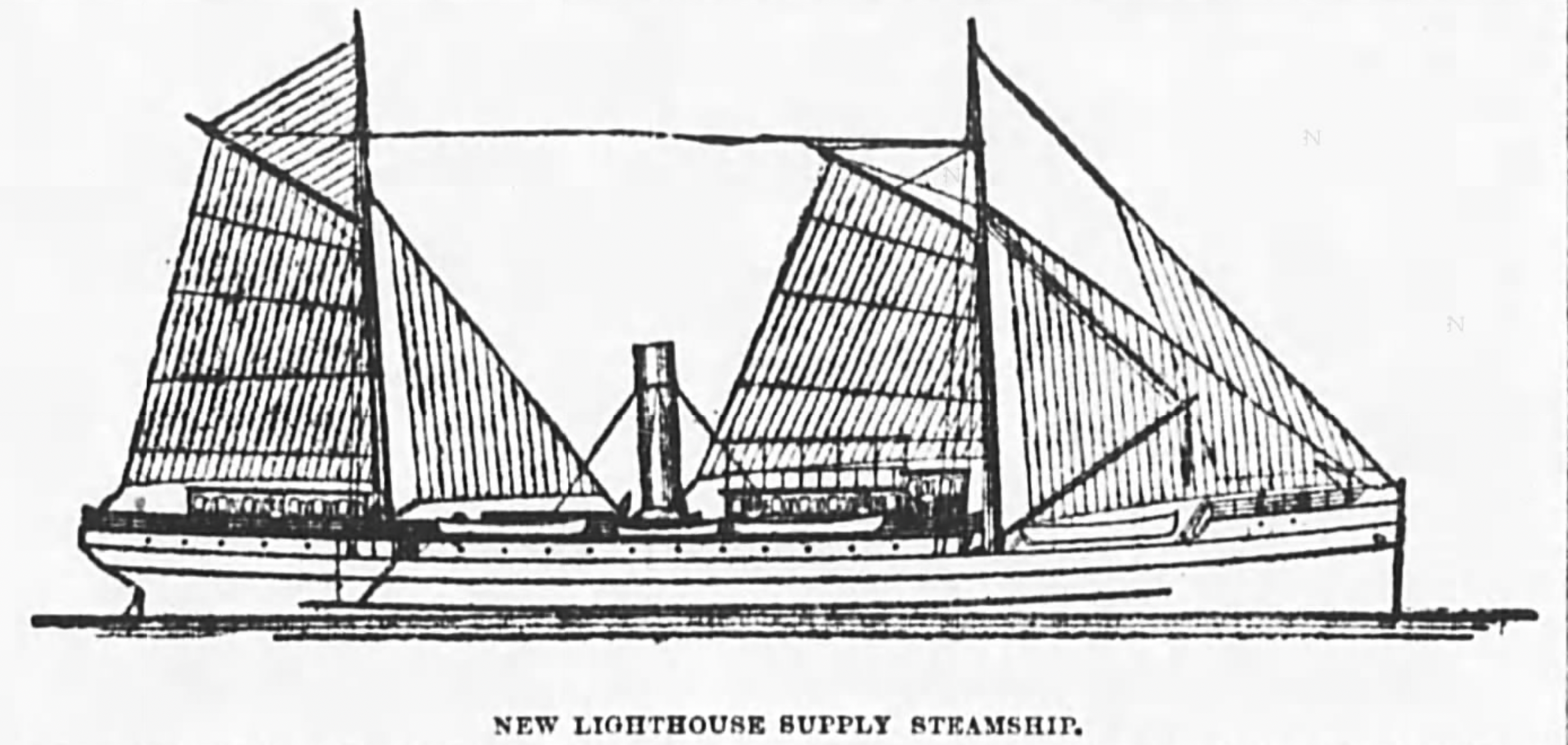
USLHT Azalea, showing her sail plan as designed in 1890

In its 1888 Annual Report to the Secretary of the Treasury, the Lighthouse Board requested $80,000 for a new tender for the 2nd Lighthouse District. The urgency of this request was driven by the need to replace USLHT Putnam which was 31 years old and disabled by holes blown in her boiler. Congress approved the authorization on 2 March 1889. The contract to build Azalea was approved on 28 February 1890 and the first frame was put in place on 24 May 1890. Her contract price was $77,125. Her actual cost was $79,792.40.

Azalea was designed by naval architect Walfred Sylvan. She was built by the Johnson Foundry and Machine Company at its shipyard at the foot of 118th street on the Harlem River on Manhattan, New York City. The ship was launched on 29 November 1890. She was christened by Miss Dorothy Alexander, the 4-year old granddaughter of Commander George W. Coffin, Naval Secretary of the Lighthouse Board. The ship was delivered late and the Lighthouse Board exacted $1,500 of contract penalties.

Azalea's sea trial took place on 10 June 1891 in Long Island Sound. She achieved a speed of 11.75 knots. With 103 pounds of steam pressure her engine turned the propeller at a rate of 105 revolutions per minute, developing 446 horsepower. As a result of the successful trial, the ship was formally accepted by the Lighthouse Board on 18 June 1891. She was moored at the lighthouse depot on Staten Island where she took on supplies and provisions before sailing to her home port of Woods Hole, Massachusetts on 23 June 1891.

Her hull was built of mild steel plates, riveted together. The ship was 154 feet (47 m) long overall (145 feet (44 m) between perpendiculars), with a beam of 25 feet (7.6 m), and a depth of hold of 12 feet 3 inches (3.73 m). She was engineered to draw 8 feet (2.4 m) on an even keel with 20 tons of cargo aboard. She was equipped with ballast tanks to trim her stern down to keep her propeller submerged when she was towing in heavy seas. She displaced 330 tons when light, and 516 tons fully loaded.

Azalea was driven by a single cast-iron propeller 8 feet (2.4 m) in diameter. Power was provided by a single vertical compound steam engine. The bores of its two cylinders were 19 inches (48 cm) and 36 inches (91 cm) and the stroke of the pistons was 28 inches (71 cm). Steam for the engine was produced by a single coal-fired boiler.

The ship had two masts and was rigged to sail as a schooner. She had a long foredeck which was equipped with a derrick that used a separate steam engine to lift buoys and other loads on and off the ship.

In 1902, the ship was wired for electric light. Azalea was equipped with a radio by at least 1919.

Her complement in 1915 was 5 officers and 19 crew.

== U.S. Lighthouse Service (1891–1917) ==
Azalea reached Little Harbor in Woods Hole, her new home port, for the first time on 25 June 1891. At this time the Lighthouse Service was controlled by the U.S. Lighthouse Board, a bureau of the U.S. Department of the Treasury. In this quasi-military organization, each Lighthouse District had an Inspector, typically a U.S. Navy officer, and an Engineer, typically an officer of the Army Corps of Engineers. While the Inspector was responsible for the maintenance and placement of buoys and lightships, as well as the supply of lighthouses and lightships, the Engineer was responsible for the construction and maintenance of lighthouses and related civil engineering projects. Azalea was assigned to the District Inspector of the 2nd Lighthouse District.

In 1903, the Lighthouse Board was transferred to the newly created U.S. Department of Commerce and Labor. Since the Lighthouse Board still had operational control of the Lighthouse Service, little changed in Azalea's operations. In 1910, Congress abolished the Lighthouse Board and replaced it with an all-civilian bureau of the U.S. Department of Commerce and Labor. Azalea became part of this new organization. This change did impact the ship's work in that the District Inspector and Engineer were replaced by a single District Supervisor, and military personnel were replaced by civilians.

Buoys are moved by storms and ice, break loose from their anchors, are hit by passing ships, rust, and worn by the weather. They require periodic maintenance, and this was one of Azalea's main missions. In 1895, for example, she changed or replaced 230 buoys, and painted 75. Azalea's buoy tending chores were complicated by winter sea ice along the New England coast. Ice would damage or sink large iron buoys, so every fall Azalea would replace threatened nuns, cans, and bell buoys with wooden spar buoys. In the spring, she would have to reverse the process and put all the metal buoys back in place. Azalea also placed temporary buoys around wrecks while preparations were made to remove them.

Many lighthouses and all lightships were supplied from the sea since they were inaccessible from land. Azalea supplied these facilities with coal, wood, lamp oil, food, water and other materials. In 1895, her deliveries to lighthouses and lightships included 453 tons of coal. Azalea also was responsible for rotating the lighthouse keepers and lightship crews from inaccessible facilities. Transferring supplies and men in small boats on the open ocean from lighthouse tenders to lightships was risky. Boats were swamped by high seas. Beginning in 1907, the Lighthouse Service began rotating lightships ashore for provisioning, reducing Azalea's supply responsibilities.

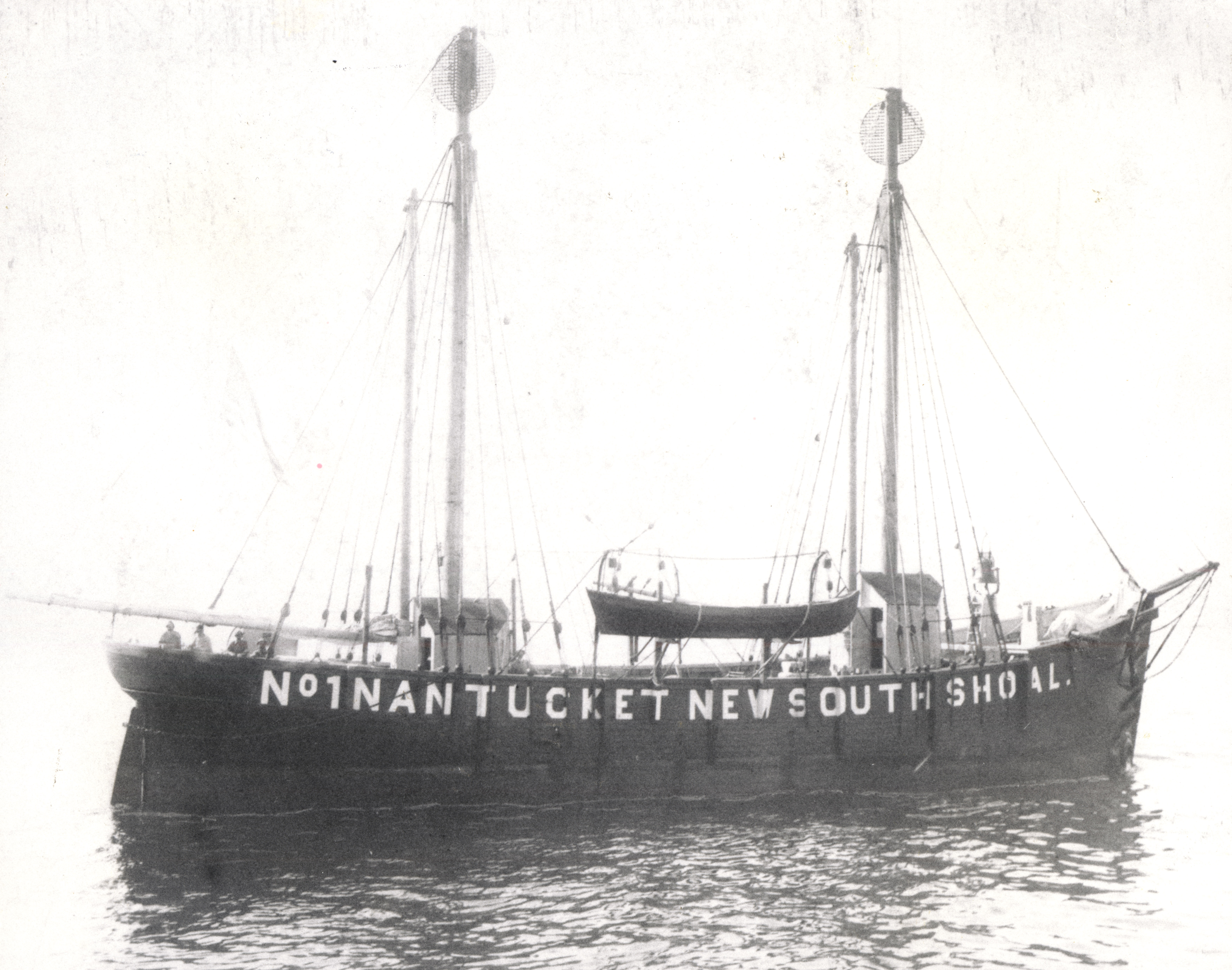
Light Vessel No. 1 which Azalea towed to South Carolina in 1892

While some lightships of this era were capable of self-propulsion, either by sail or propeller, many were towed to and from their stations. This applied to short trips, as when Azalea towed the Cross Rip Lightship, Light Vessel No. 5, to New Bedford for routine maintenance in April 1893, and to long trips, as when Azalea towed Light Vessel No. 1, which served as the Nantucket Shoals lightship, to Charleston, South Carolina for redeployment in the fall of 1892. Azalea also restored lightships that had been moved from their assigned stations by storms. For example, the Pollock Rip lightship, Light Vessel No. 47, dragged its anchor a mile during a gale in November 1895. She was replaced in the correct location by Azalea.

=== Notable events ===
Azalea was part of the naval review on the Hudson River during the dedication of Grant's Tomb in New York City on 27 April 1897. Taking advantage of her trip to New York, she picked up a load of buoys and chain from the general lighthouse depot on Staten Island before returning to Woods Hole.

On the night of 2 October 1899, Azalea collided with the schooner William H. Davenport near Old Saybrook, Connecticut. The tender's bow was damaged in the event, but she was able to make port in New Bedford. The ship was hauled out on the marine railway at the Lockwood Manufacturing Company in East Boston for repairs on 26 October 1899. The cost of the repairs was $4,261. Litigation between the United States and the managing owner of William H. Davenport related to this collision was fought all the way to the United States Supreme Court in 1902. On 31 March 1920, Congress appropriated $2,759.20 to pay for damages to William H. Davenport resulting from the collision.

=== Rescues ===
For much of her time on the Massachusetts coast, Azalea was one of the few government vessels which had the ability to brave boisterous weather to rescue ships in distress. Her regular work towing lightships meant that she had both the equipment and trained crew to tow vessels in distress safely to port. Her rescues included:

The schooner William Slater was attempting to make port in Hyannis, Massachusetts during a gale in September 1898. She was disabled, lost two anchors, and was adrift when she was taken in tow by Azalea. The ship was brought to port, saving her and her crew.

In November 1901, the schooner Guardian was wrecked on Pollock Rip. Azalea was able to rescue the crew and land them safely in Hyannis.

The schooner Sally E. Ludlam was partially dismasted in March 1902. She managed to reach Nantucket, but lost her port anchor. Azalea took her in tow to Vineyard Haven. In a similar incident in October 1907, the schooner Chester B. Lawrence was disabled by the loss of spars and sails. Azalea towed her to Hyannis.

In a storm on 10 December 1905, Light Vessel 58 sprang a leak. The steam engine-powered bilge pumps were engaged, but it became quickly apparent that they would not be able to keep pace with the flooding. By happenstance, the ship was one of first selected for testing a Marconi radio, and had three radio operators aboard. The captain sent a wireless distress message which was received by the Naval Torpedo Station at Newport, Rhode Island. The message read, "Nantucket Shoals Lightship in distress. Send help from anywhere." Azalea was dispatched to the flooding ship's aid from New Bedford. By the time she reached the lightship, water had extinguished her boiler fires and the crew was bailing by hand. Azalea towed her for 18 miles back toward port until the lightship began to founder. Despite high seas, all 12 men of the lightship's crew were transferred to Azalea before she sank. The dramatic rescue came to the attention of Admiral Dewey, who was president of the General Board of the Navy at the time. This brought about a pay increase for Captain Charles I. Gibbs of Azalea. The radio signal which brought Azalea to the rescue was the first distress message ever sent by wireless by an American ship.

Azalea rescued the three-man crew of the schooner Mary Farrow in June 1910 after they abandoned the sinking ship.

On 29 December 1911, the schooner Rescue dragged her anchor in a storm off Hyannis and went aground. Leaking and immobile, she raised distress flags. Azalea was able to tow her off the mud flats and brought her into port.

In 1916 Azalea towed the disabled tug Sadie Ross, and the barge she was towing safely to port.

== U.S. Navy (1917–1919) ==
On 11 April 1917 President Wilson issued Executive Order 2588 transferring a number of lighthouse tenders to support the American military effort in World War I. Azalea was transferred from the administrative control of the Commerce Department to the War Department and she came under the jurisdiction of the U.S. Navy.

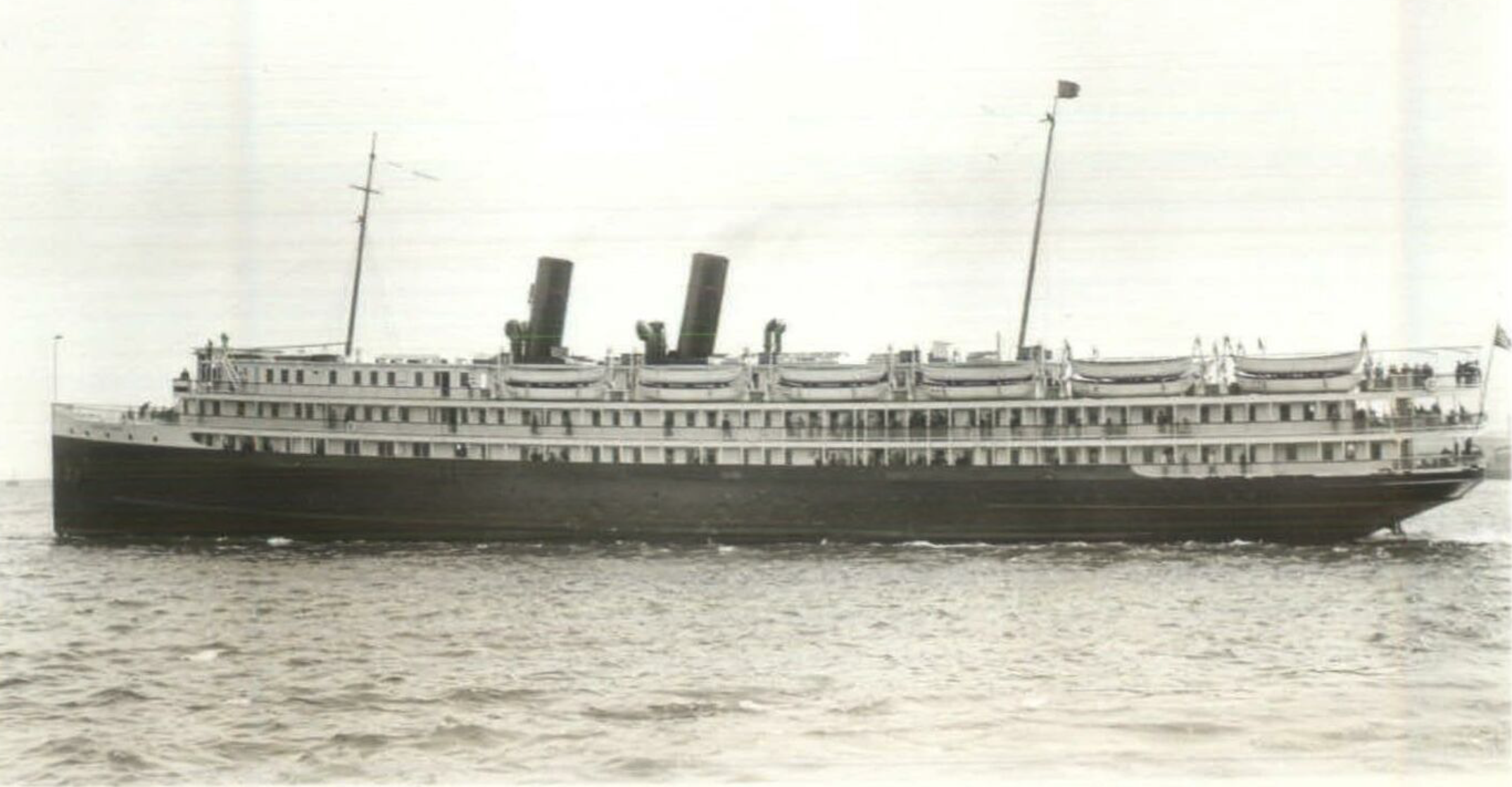
Northland, whose passengers Azalea disembarked in 1919

The Navy commissioned her on 9 May 1917 and she became USS Azalea, the second naval ship of that name. She was assigned to the 1st Naval District and remained at her post on the Massachusetts coast. While the U.S. Navy's history of her service reports that she tended anti-submarine nets, most of her work reported in the newspapers of the day were the same activities she engaged in with the Lighthouse Service. She repositioned lightships, tended buoys, and assisted vessels in distress. The most dramatic event of her wartime service came when the passenger steamer Northland, en route from New York to Boston ran aground in a fog near New Bedford on 21 June 1919. Azalea was one of two ships which safely disembarked the Northland's 350 passengers and took them to shore.

The war ended on 11 November 1918, and the Navy returned Azalea to the Lighthouse Service, under the jurisdiction of the Commerce Department, on 1 July 1919.

== U.S. Lighthouse Service (1919–1933) ==
Once again identified as USLHT Azalea, the ship returned to duty in the Second Lighthouse District. She resumed her familiar duties off the Massachusetts coast tending buoys, looking after the lightships, and assisting vessels in distress.

=== Notable events ===
Azalea collided with the schooner Lavinia M. Snow off Pollock Rip Shoal near Monomoy Island, on 8 July 1921 in a heavy fog. Azalea returned to New Bedford with the schooner's anchor embedded in her hull as a souvenir of the event. She lost her smokestack, searchlight, and derrick mast as the schooner swept past.

On 26 March 1929, Azalea and the U.S. Coast Guard patrol boat 133, towed the 5,663 ton freighter Eastern Glade off Half-Moon Shoal in Nantucket Sound.

=== Rescues ===
In March 1923, Relief Light Vessel No. 90 went aground on Nashawena Island. Azalea was dispatched to the scene. In the midst of a storm, the lightship rolled to starboard and flooded. The crew abandoned ship and were taken to safety aboard Azalea.

=== Obsolescence and sale ===
In 1931, the Commissioner of Lighthouses requested funding to replace Azalea, which was then beyond economical repair. Contracts for the replacement ship were signed in July 1932. The newly launched USLHT Arbutus reached the 2nd Lighthouse District in mid-1933 and replaced Azalea. The 43-year old Azalea was moored first at the Chelsea Lighthouse Depot and then at the Edgemoor Lighthouse Depot to await her fate. Sealed bids were taken on 17 November 1933. On 9 December 1933 Azalea was sold to Frank R. Jones of Wilmington, Delaware for $2,069. Jones ran a tug and barge company in Wilmington.

== Wilson Line (1933–1940) ==
Frank R. Jones sold the vessel to the Wilson Line very shortly after acquiring her. Azalea was reconditioned and put into service as a freighter and towboat between Philadelphia and Wilmington. She was renamed Christiana, likely for the Christiana River which flowed by the Wilson Line's docks in Wilmington.

The career of a small coastal steamship was not particularly newsworthy in the 1930s. The only public reporting that survives is when Christiana rescued two boys from a leaky rowboat on the Delaware River on 10 November 1936. Her Federal registration shows that she was owned by the Wilson Line and continued to be propelled by a steam engine through mid-1939.

== Bahamas Trading Company (1940–1942) ==
Sometime between mid-1939 and the end of 1940, Christiana was sold to the Bahamas Trading Company. Her new owners changed her registration to Honduras. One source reports that Bahamas Trading Company converted Christiana from steam to Diesel propulsion in 1941.

The Bahamas Trading Company's ship Arawak burned to the waterline and sank in September 1941. Within the week, Christiana was assigned to take her place on the company's freight route between Jacksonville, Florida and The Bahamas.

== U.S. Navy (1942–1946) ==
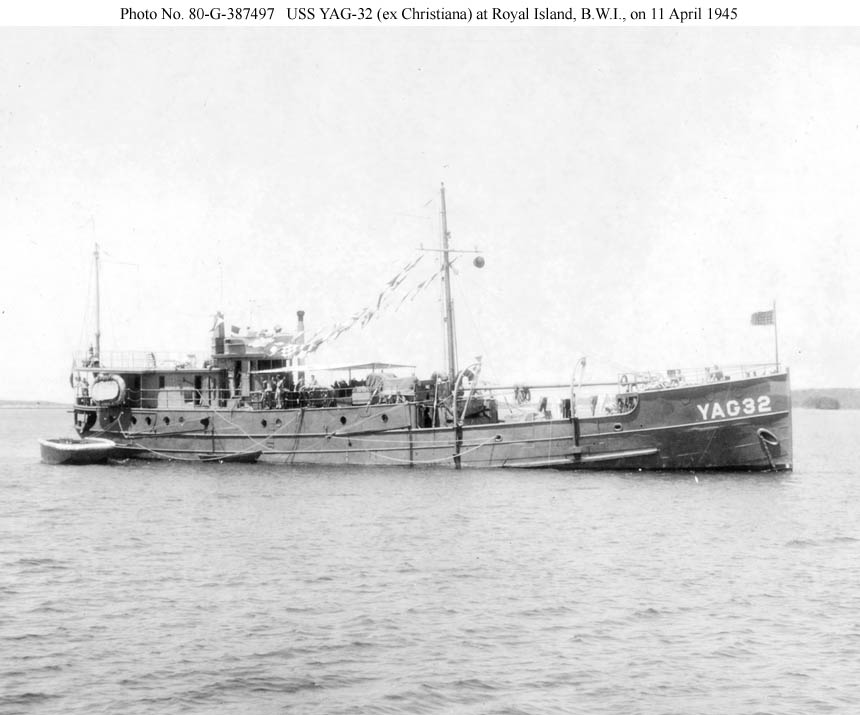
YAG-32 serving as a seaplane tender at Royal Island in 1945

The U.S. Navy reacquired the ship in August 1942. It retained her name and commissioned her USS Christiana on 9 November 1942. Originally identified as IX-80, an "unclassified vessel", her name was cancelled and she was reclassified as YAG-32, a "yard auxiliary, general," vessel on 20 November 1943.

Christiana was considered a "mobile base" for seaplanes and patrol boats by the Gulf Sea Frontier and was employed by both the 7th and 8th Naval Districts. To fill that role she was modified to achieve an at-sea endurance of 40 days, and an on-station endurance of 30 days. She was fitted with fuel tanks that held 30,000 gallons, and quarters and mess facilities for 10 officers and 60 men. Since her normal complement was 5 officers and 45 men, she could feed and house visiting flyers. Her radio equipment included one transceiver, two transmitters, and two receivers. She was armed with a 6-pounder gun, and two .50 caliber machine guns.

From 15 to 21 December 1942 Christiana was on the marine railway at Naval Operating Base Key West for repairs and modifications. Work on the ship was completed on 21 January 1943 and she remained in port until 10 Feb 1943. Christiana departed Key West on 27 February 1943 for temporary duty as a base for anti-submarine operations at Timbalier Island, Louisiana. During this deployment she made port in New Orleans for provisions on 29–30 March 1943.

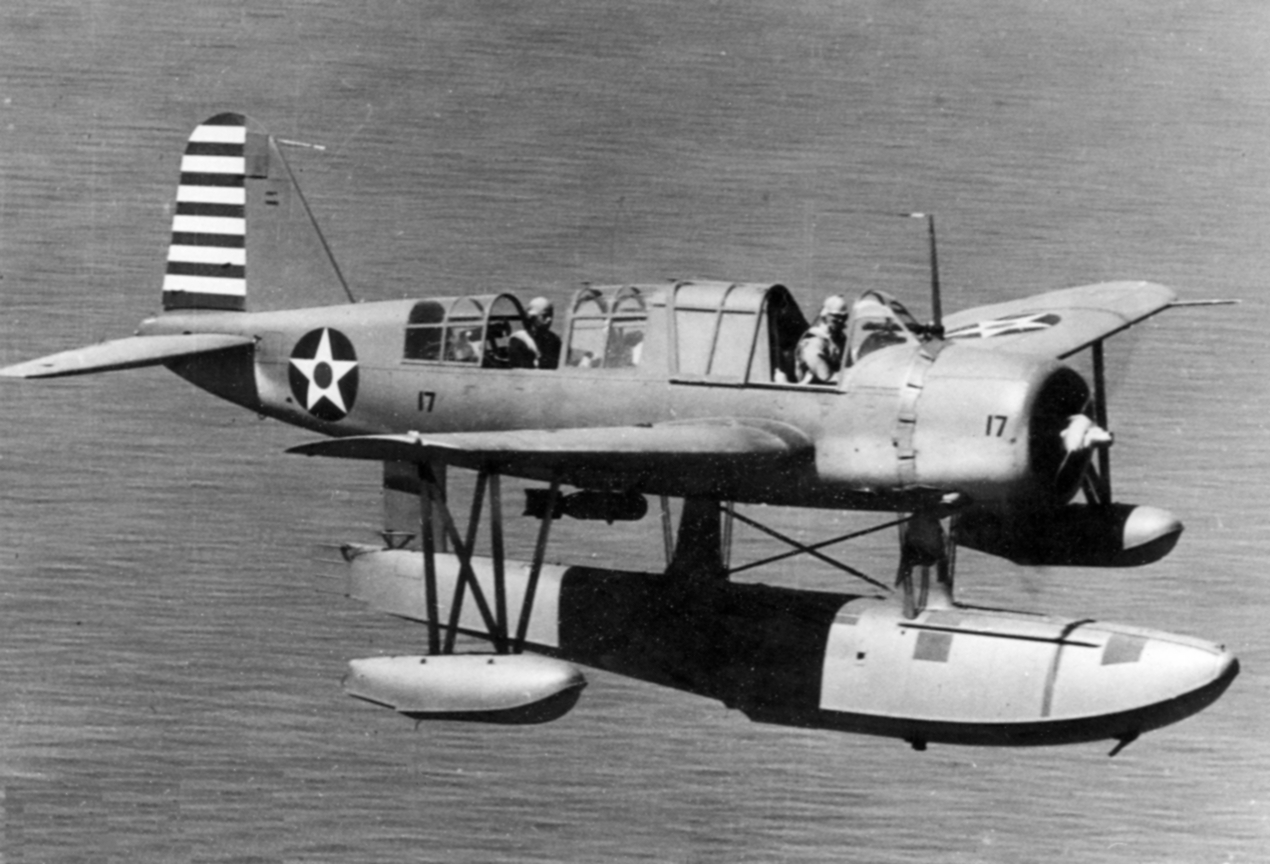
Kingfisher seaplane of the type Christiana supported in The Bahamas for Scouting Squadron 39

During World War II, the U.S. Navy maintained regular airborne patrols over the Atlantic coast of Florida focused on detecting U-boats, assisting vessels in distress, and search and rescue operations. Some of these patrols were flown by seaplanes. These had the advantage of being able to land at places where there was no permanent runway. The Navy created a series of advanced bases in The Bahamas to extend the range of its maritime patrols further from the United States mainland. These were located at Nassau, Walker Cay, north of Grand Bahama Island, Royal Island, just west of Eleuthera Island, and Pelican Harbor on Great Abaco Island. Christiana served at all these bases. On 24 May 1943 she sailed from Miami to Pelican Harbor to begin this work.

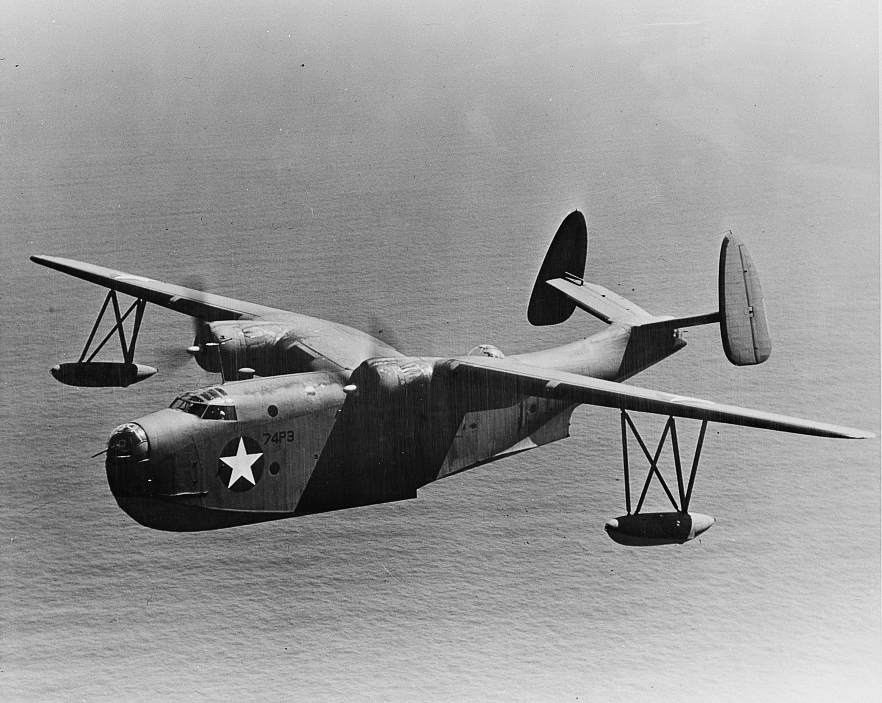
Mariner seaplane of the type Christiana supported for Patrol Bombing Squadron 208

There were four squadrons which were Christiana's primary customers in The Bahamas. Scouting Squadron 39, which was based at Naval Air Station Banana River, flew OS2U Kingfisher seaplanes. The seaplane base at Walker Cay, which Christiana served was considered the advanced base of this squadron. Patrol Bombing Squadron 208, which was based at Key West, flew PBM-3C Mariner seaplanes. It used Christiana at Pelican Harbor as its advanced base from its assignment to Key West until November 1943. Patrol Squadron 213, flew PBM-3 aircraft from Key West and used Christiana as a tender at Nassau in January 1944, and at Royal Island in April and May 1944. Patrol Squadron 201, flying PBM-3S Mariners based in Key West, used Christiana, then YAG-32, as a seaplane tender at Royal Island from September 1944 through February 1945,

In November 1943, the Pelican Harbor advanced base was abandoned due to its exposure to storm damage. After the surrender of Germany eliminated the U-boat threat, the advance base at Royal Island was closed on 25 May 1945 and YAG-32 sailed for Miami to be decommissioned.

YAG-32 was decommissioned at Miami on 28 July 1945. In February 1946 she was moored in Miami at the Merrill Stevens Drydock & Repair Company shipyard. There she was transferred from the Navy to the U.S. Maritime Commission, which was responsible for disposing of surplus ships, on 25 February 1946.

== Banana Supply Company (1946–1956?) ==
YAG-32 was purchased from the U.S. Maritime Commission by Samuel E. Thatcher, president of Banana Supply Company of Miami, Florida. He reinstated her name, Christiana, and her Honduran registry. She was used to transport bananas from Central America to Miami. She sailed in ballast from Miami, with no cargo, to ports in the Dominican Republic, Colombia, and Cuba, and returned with bananas. Her capacity was about 6,000 stems. Her first voyage for her new owner was in February 1947 and her last was in June 1956. It is not clear what became of the ship after her last sailing for Banana Supply Company.

== Obscurity and scrapping (1956?–1965) ==
United Metal and Steel Corporation, a scrap metal dealer in Miami, acquired Christiana in a bankruptcy proceeding in approximately 1963. It had no use for the vessel. She was moored in the Miami River at roughly 3601 SW River Drive at the company's dock. She sank at her moorings and became an eyesore and hazard to navigation as various authorities struggled with how to remove her. On 1 March 1965, the county commission agreed to the removal and scrapping of the ship by James Reilly.
