= Mayflower High School (Arkansas) =

Location
- 10 Lesley King Drive; Mayflower, Arkansas 72106; United States
- Coordinates: 34°57′25″N 92°26′37″W

Information
- School type: Public comprehensive
- Status: Open
- School district: Mayflower School District
- CEEB code: 041595
- NCES School ID: 050954000698
- Teaching staff: 29.84 (on FTE basis)
- Grades: 9–12
- Enrollment: 345 (2023–2024)
- Student to teacher ratio: 11.56
- Education system: ADE Smart Core curriculum
- Classes offered: Regular, Advanced Placement (AP)
- Colors: Purple and gold
- Athletics conference: 3A Region 2
- Mascot: Eagle
- Team name: Mayflower Eagles
- Accreditation: ADE
- Feeder to: Mayflower Middle School
- Affiliation: Arkansas Activities Association
- Website: mhs.mayflower.school

Mayflower High School is a comprehensive public high school for more than 300 students in grades 9 through 12 located in Mayflower, Arkansas, United States. Mayflower is one of six public high schools in Faulkner County and the sole high school administered by the Mayflower School District.

The school district includes the majority of Mayflower and portions of Conway.

== Academics ==
The assumed course of study follows the Smart Core curriculum developed by the Arkansas Department of Education (ADE), which requires students complete at least 22 units prior to graduation. Students complete regular coursework and exams and may take Advanced Placement (AP) courses and exam with the opportunity to receive college credit.

== Athletics ==
The Mayflower High School athletic emblem (mascot) is the Eagle with purple and gold serving as the school colors.

The Mayflower Eagles compete in interscholastic activities within the 3A Classification administered by the Arkansas Activities Association. The Eagles play within the 3A Region 2 Conference and field varsity teams in football, volleyball, golf (boys/girls), bowling (boys/girls), basketball (boys/girls), cheer, baseball, fastpitch softball, and track and field (boys/girls).
