= USLHT Arbutus (1879 ship) =

US Lighthouse Tender

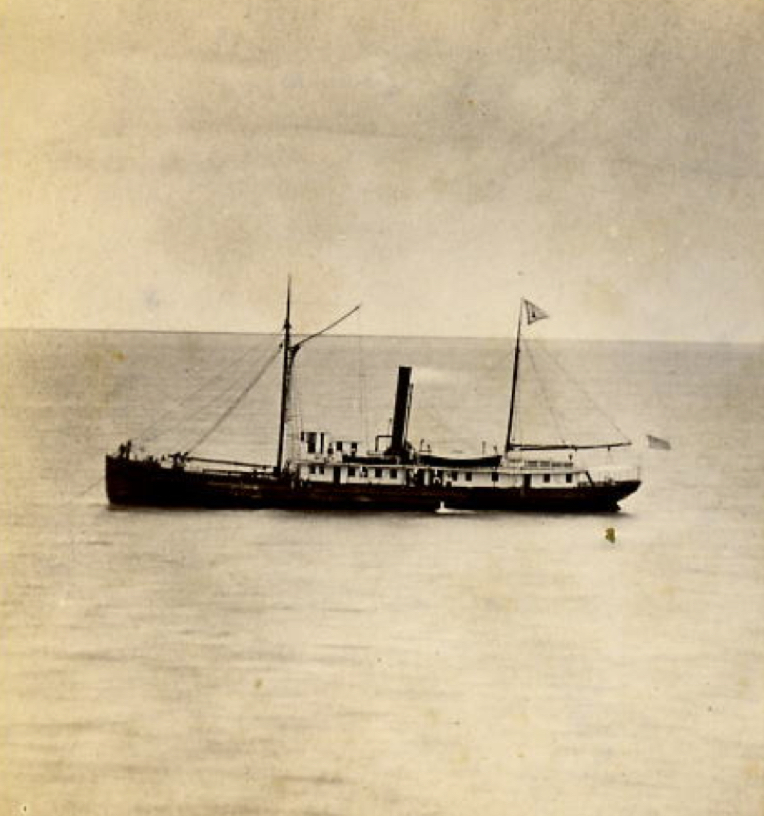
- USLHT Arbutus

History

United States
- Name: USLHT Arbutus
- Operator: United States Lighthouse Service
- Builder: Malster and Reaney Company
- Cost: $49,769
- Launched: 1 July 1879
- Identification: Signal Letters: GVMT
- Fate: Transferred to U.S. Navy

United States
- Name: USS Arbutus
- Operator: United States Navy
- Acquired: 11 April 1917
- Identification: Signal letters: NAGM
- Fate: Transferred to U.S. Lighthouse Service

History

United States
- Name: USLHT Arbutus
- Operator: United States Lighthouse Service
- Acquired: 1 July 1919
- Decommissioned: 1925
- Identification: Signal Letters: GVMT
- Fate: Sold at auction

United States
- Name: Arbutus
- Operator: Union Shipbuilding Company
- Acquired: 1925
- Identification: Signal Letters: MGBC, KJBR Official Number: 225246
- Fate: Scrapped in 1935

General characteristics as built in 1879
- Displacement: 545 tons fully loaded
- Length: 150 ft (46 m)
- Beam: 25 ft (7.6 m)
- Draft: 8 ft (2.4 m)
- Depth of hold: 11 ft (3.4 m)
- Installed power: 2 steam engines

USLHT Arbutus was a wooden-hulled, steam-powered lighthouse tender built for the United States Lighthouse Board in 1879. She served on the Atlantic and Gulf coasts in this role until 1925. During World War I, she was transferred to the United States Navy and was commissioned as USS Arbutus, but her duties largely remained those of a lighthouse tender.

She was sold in 1925 and became a workboat for Union Shipbuilding Company, which used her to salvage steel ships which were recycled in the company's shipyard. She was likely scrapped in 1935.

== Construction and characteristics ==
On 20 June 1878 Congress appropriated $50,000 for the "building of a steam-tender for general service on the Atlantic coast." In October 1878 William T. Malster was the low bidder on the contract to build Arbutus. He bid $43,500 and a completion time of 260 days. Malster and Reaney Company built Arbutus at its shipyard in Canton, Maryland.

Arbutus was launched on 1 July 1879. She was christened by Miss Emma Lucas. The ship slid down the ways and promptly collided with the schooner Ridie, fully loaded with cargo, sailing out of Baltimore Harbor. Arbutus' starboard propeller hit the schooner and broke off one of its blades. The impact punched a large hole in Ridie's hull, and despite the efforts of her crew and a number of nearby vessels, she sank in the channel. Ridie was raised on 3 July 1879, and her owners submitted a bill to Malster and Reaney for damage to cargo, salvage costs, and repair of the ship. The shipyard declined to pay. The owners of Ridie sued Malsters and Reaney for $3,500 and won the full amount claimed. The decision was affirmed on appeal.

Arbutus' sea trial took place on 21 August 1879 in Delaware Bay. The ship attained a speed of 11 knots. Based on this successful trial, she was accepted by the Lighthouse Board on 1 September 1879. The ship's original cost was $49,769.

Her hull was built of wood. The ship was 150 feet (46 m) long overall (145 feet (44 m) between perpendiculars), with a beam of 25 feet (7.6 m), a depth of hold of 11 feet (3.4 m), and a draft of 7 feet 1 inch (2.16 m) when light, and 9 feet (2.7 m) when fully loaded. Her gross register tonnage was 400, and her net register tonnage was 75. She displaced 398 tons light and 545 tons loaded.

Arbutus was driven by two propellers. Power was provided by two inverted cylinder surface condensing steam engines. The cylinders in each engine were 21 inches (53 cm) in diameter and had a stroke of 27 inches (69 cm). Her boiler was coal-fired.

The ship was built as a gaff-rigged, two-masted schooner. Her foremast was used with a boom as a derrick to lift buoys and other heavy cargoes on and off the ship.

A steam-powered electric generator was installed on the ship in 1898. This powered electric lights and a searchlight. Arbutus had a radio installed in 1918. In order to accommodate a radio room, quarters for a radio operator, and to improve the officers' quarters, the ship underwent an extensive refit in 1918 that cost $27,967 and almost six months of work.

In 1909 Arbutus had a complement of 5 officers and 14 men.

Lighthouse tenders were named for trees and shrubs. Arbutus is a genus of flowering plants in the heather family. The Arbutus launched in 1879 was the second vessel of that name to serve as a lighthouse tender. A subsequent USLHT Arbutus was launched in 1933.

== United States government service (1879–1925) ==
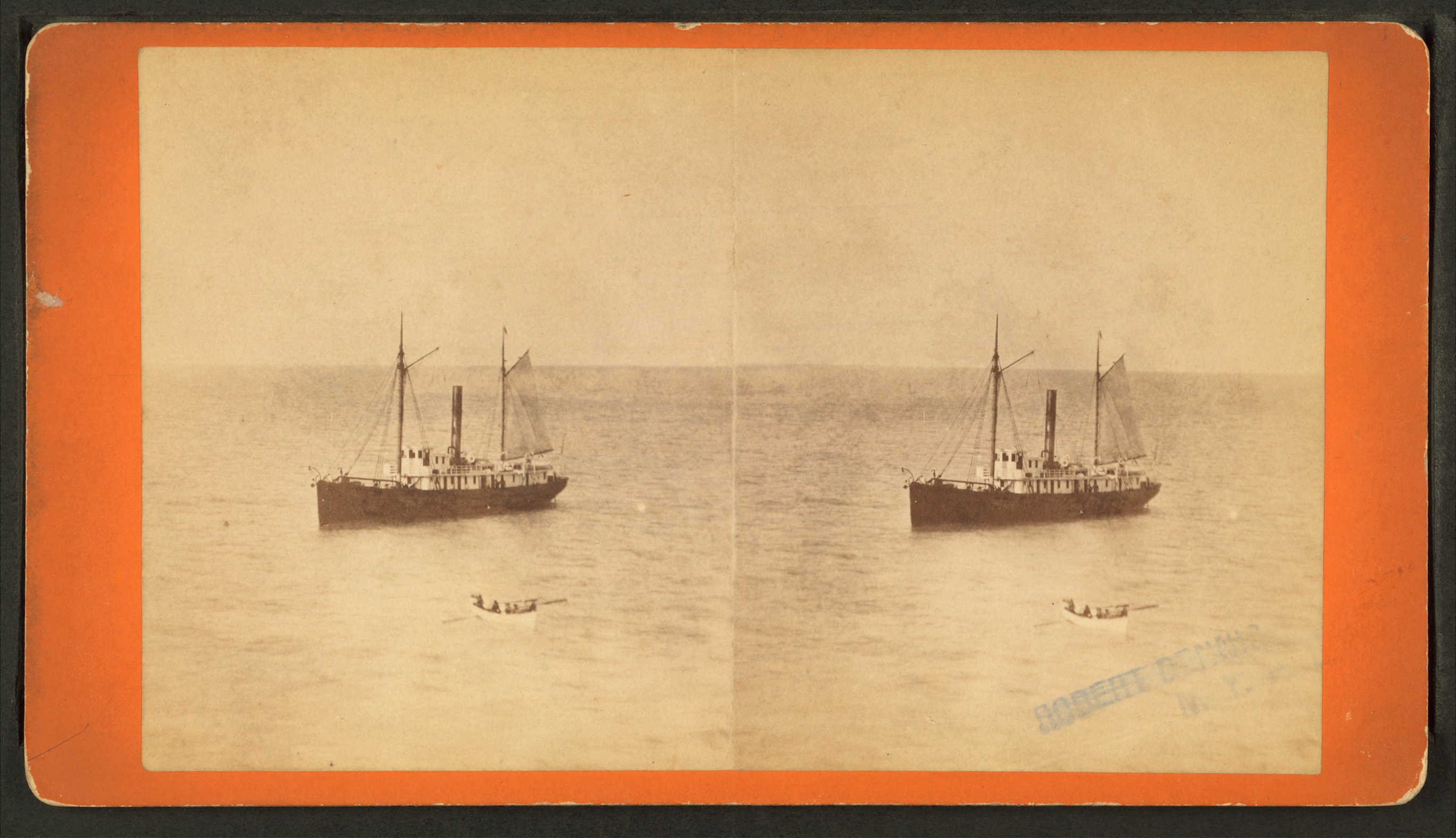
Stereoscopic view of Arbutus

=== 4th Lighthouse District (1879-1882) ===
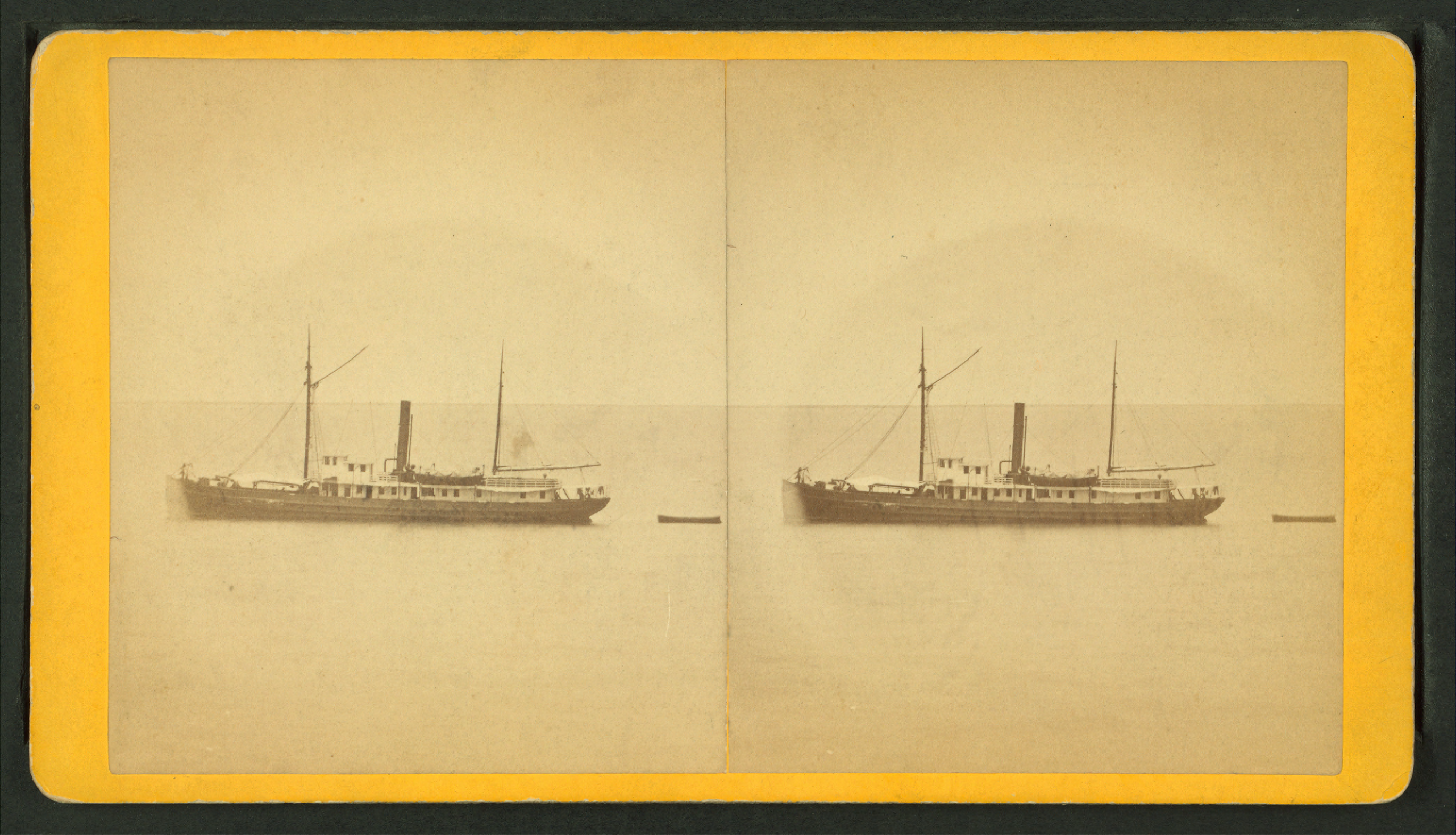
Stereoscopic view of Arbutus

Arbutus first sailed in the fleet of the U.S. Lighthouse Board, a bureau of the U.S. Department of the Treasury. In this quasi-military organization, each Lighthouse District had an Inspector, typically a Naval officer, and an Engineer, typically an officer from the Army Corps of Engineers. While the Engineer was primarily responsible for the construction and maintenance of lighthouses, piers, and other structures, the Inspector was primarily responsible for supplying lighthouses and lightships, and maintaining buoys and lightships in their assigned locations. Arbutus was initially assigned to the inspector of the 4th Lighthouse District and based in Wilmington, Delaware. The district encompassed the coasts of Delaware and Maryland, and portions of the shores of New Jersey and Virginia. She replaced USLHT Violet, which was reassigned to the 5th Lighthouse District. Violet's crew, however, who knew the local waters, was transferred to Arbutus.

Buoys are moved by storms and ice, break loose from their anchors, are hit by passing ships, rust, and worn by the weather. They require periodic maintenance, and this was one of Arbutus's main missions. Her buoy tending chores were complicated by winter sea in Delaware Bay and the rivers which flowed into it. Ice would damage or sink large iron buoys, so every fall Arbutus would replace threatened nuns, cans, and bell buoys with wooden spar buoys. In the spring she would have to reverse the process and put all the metal buoys back in place. Arbutus also placed temporary buoys around wrecks while preparations were made to remove them.

Many lighthouses and all lightships were supplied by sea, since their remote locations offered no land transportation. Arbutus performed this task through her entire career, delivering mail, food, water, and other supplies.

While some lightships of this era were capable of self-propulsion, many were towed to and from their stations. For example, in 1881 Arbutus towed Light-ship No. 40 to her station at Five-Fathom Bank.

As one of the few government vessels in the area, she was also involved in assisting vessels in distress. For example, on 5 April 1880, Arbutus towed the British freighter Brennus into deep water after she had gone aground.

=== 7th and 8th Lighthouse Districts (1882-1917) ===
In March 1882, Abutus and USLHT Geranium switched assignments. Arbutus moved to New Orleans, while Geranium took her place at Wilmington. The change was made because Arbutus was judged to be more seaworthy in the open waters of the Gulf of Mexico. Arbutus was assigned to the District Engineers and thus supported construction and repairs. She was shared between the 7th and 8th Lighthouse Districts. Her responsibilities included the entire coast of the United States from the Mexican border to Cape Canaveral, Florida.

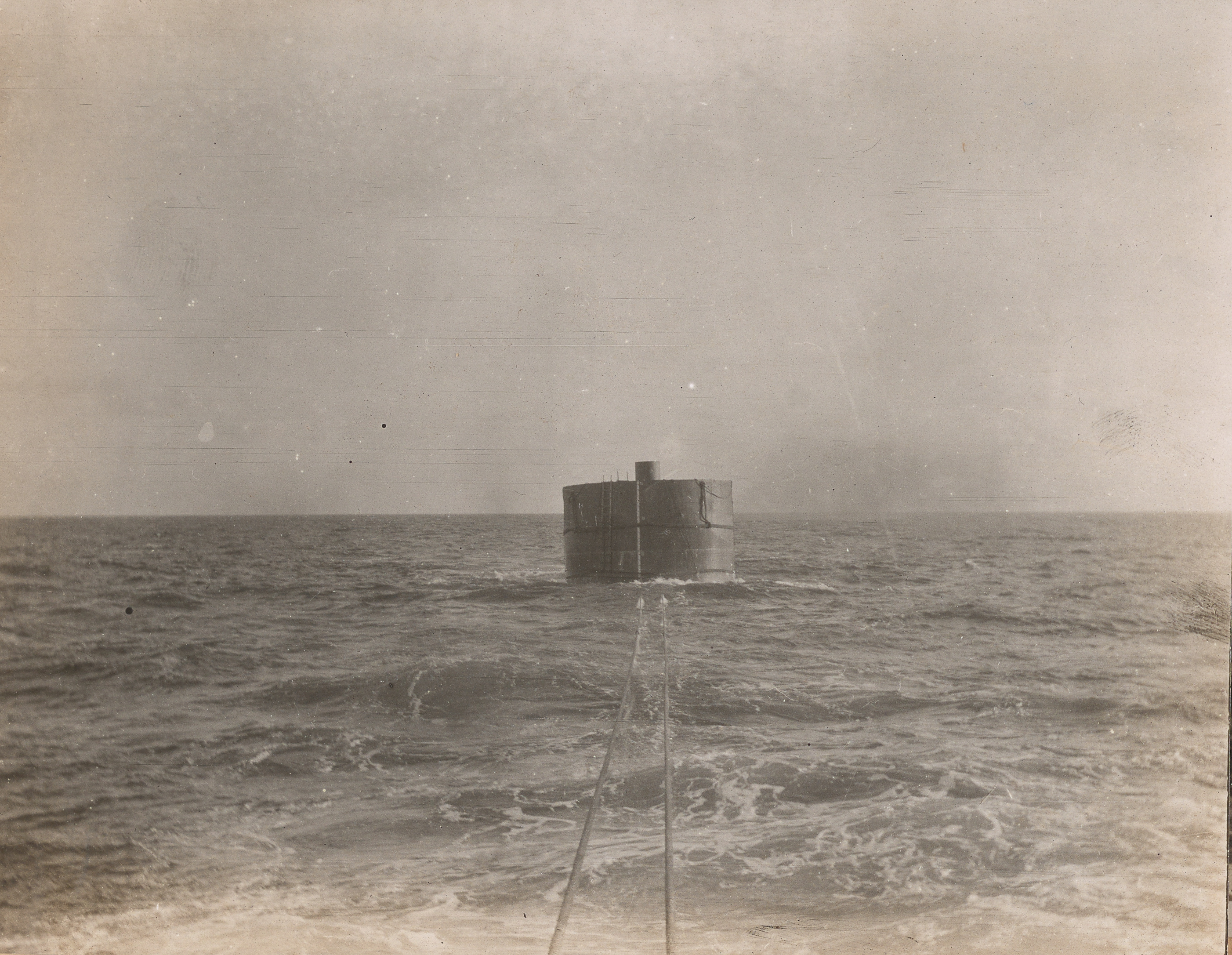
In 1904, Arbutus towed the caisson for the Sabine Bank Lighthouse to its current location

Arbutus carried men and materials, towed barges, pile-drivers, and caissons, and otherwise assisted in the construction of a number of lighthouses in the districts. These included the Anclote Key Light, Galveston Jetty Light, Hillsboro Inlet Light, Rebecca Shoal Light, Sabine Bank Light, and St. Joseph Point Light.

Her responsibilities also included repairing existing lighthouses in the districts. Among the light stations Arbutus maintained were the Aransas Pass Light, Cedar Key Light, Cape St. George Light, Charlotte Harbor Light, Crooked River Light, Egmont Key Light, Fort Barrancas Light, Fort McRee Light, Fort Point Light, Gasparilla Light, Horn Island Light, Mobile Point Light, Northwest Passage Light, Redfish Bar Cut Light, and Tortugas Harbor Light. One of Arbutus' other construction projects was laying electric cables between lighthouses and the mainland.

In 1886 the ship hit a submerged log in Mobile Bay and lost a propeller. That same year, she broke her foremast while pulling old pilings. Arbutus underwent forty-four days of repairs to correct these maintenance issues. In 1888 her boiler and a broken crankshaft in one of her engines was replaced.

In 1898, during the Spanish-American War, Arbutus assisted in laying mines at the entrance to Mobile Bay, a defense against the Spanish fleet.

Arbutus was the second government vessel carrying relief supplies to reach Galveston after the hurricane of 1900.

In 1903, the Lighthouse Board was transferred to the newly created U.S. Department of Commerce and Labor. Since the Lighthouse Board still had operational control of the U.S. Lighthouse Service, little changed in Arbutus' operations. In 1910, Congress abolished the Lighthouse Board and replaced it with the all-civilian Lighthouse Bureau of the Department of Commerce and Labor. This change did impact the ship's work in that District Inspectors and Engineers were replaced by a single civilian District Supervisor. All ships did any construction, maintenance, or buoy tending they were assigned.

=== United States Navy (1917–1919) ===
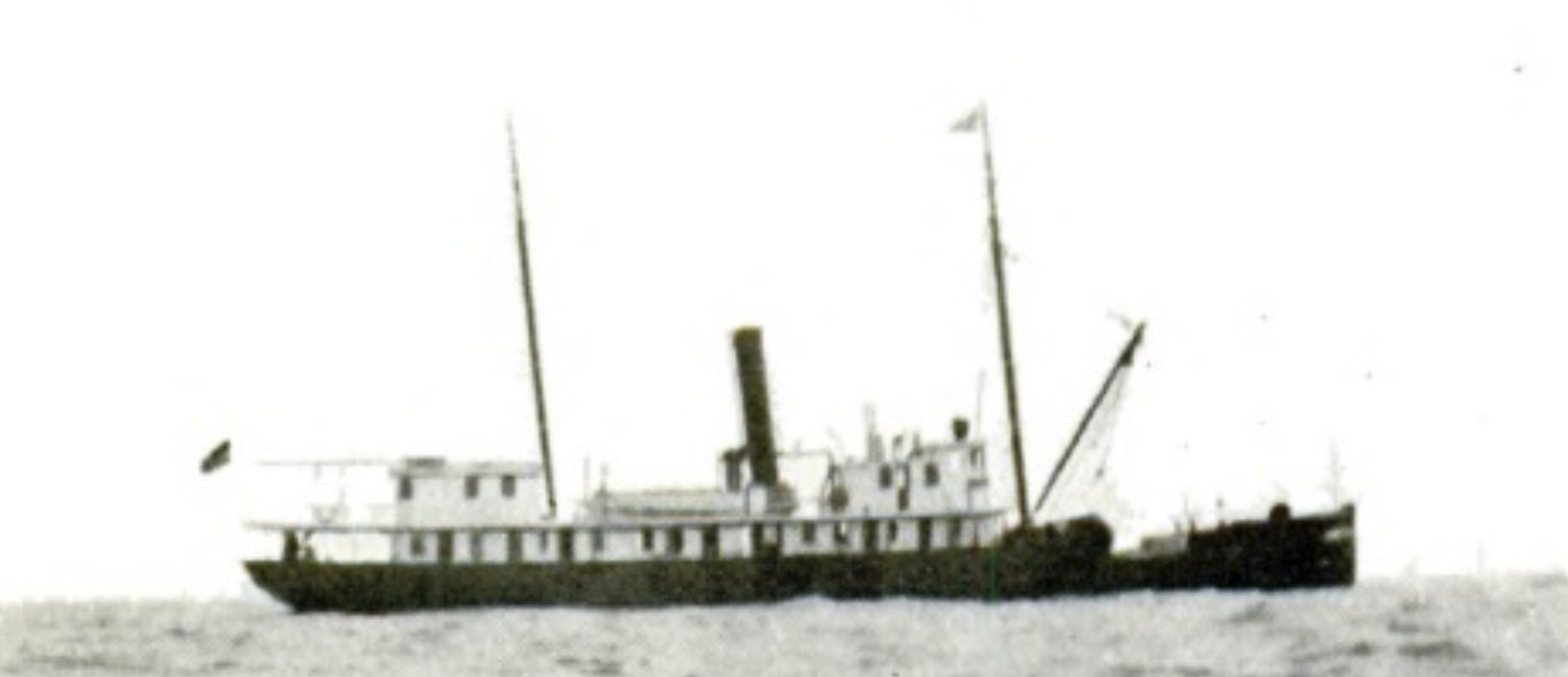
Arbutus in 1919. Note the second deck on the aft house which was added in the 1918 refit.

On 11 April 1917 President Wilson issued Executive Order 2588 transferring a number of lighthouse tenders to support the American effort in World War I. Arbutus was transferred to the U.S. Department of War, and she was commissioned into the United States Navy as USS Arbutus on 4 June 1917. She was assigned to the 5th Naval District and moved her home port to Baltimore, Maryland. She replaced USLHT Ivy in the district but traded crews with her so as to retain local knowledge of Chesapeake Bay waters.

After the war, on 1 July 1919, the components of the Lighthouse Service which had become part of the Navy were returned to the supervision of the Department of Commerce. Arbutus was struck from the Navy List.

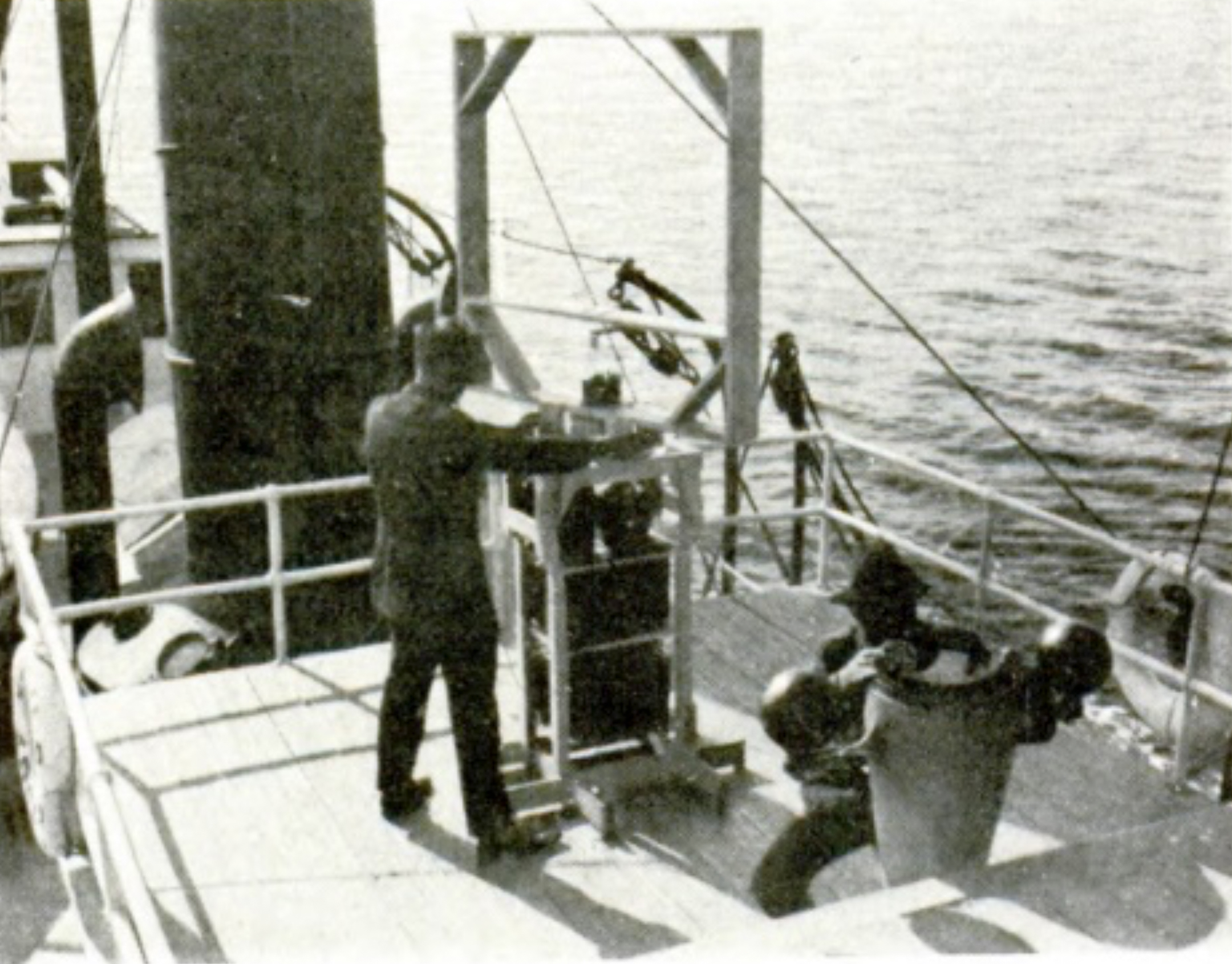
Experimental Radio Direction Finding equipment on Arbutus' pilot house roof in 1919

=== 5th Lighthouse District (1919–1925) ===
After the war, Arbutus returned to her lighthouse tender duties under the 5th Lighthouse District. In 1919 Arbutus briefly played host to engineers developing radio direction finding equipment from the National Bureau of Standards.

=== Obsolescence and sale ===
In his 1919 annual report, the Commissioner of Lighthouses reported that Arbutus was "worn out". Again, in his 1923 report, he wrote that Arbutus was "worn out and not worth further repair." The crew of Arbutus was transferred to USLHT Mayflower in August 1924. Mayflower was transferred to the 5th Lighthouse District to replace Arbutus which was laid up.

In January 1925 notice was given to the public that Arbutus would be sold in a sealed bid auction. On 14 April 1925 the bids for Arbutus were opened by the Superintendent of the 5th Lighthouse District. She was sold to the high-bidder, M. Bloch and Son, of Norfolk, Virginia for $3,025.

== Commercial Service (1925–1935) ==
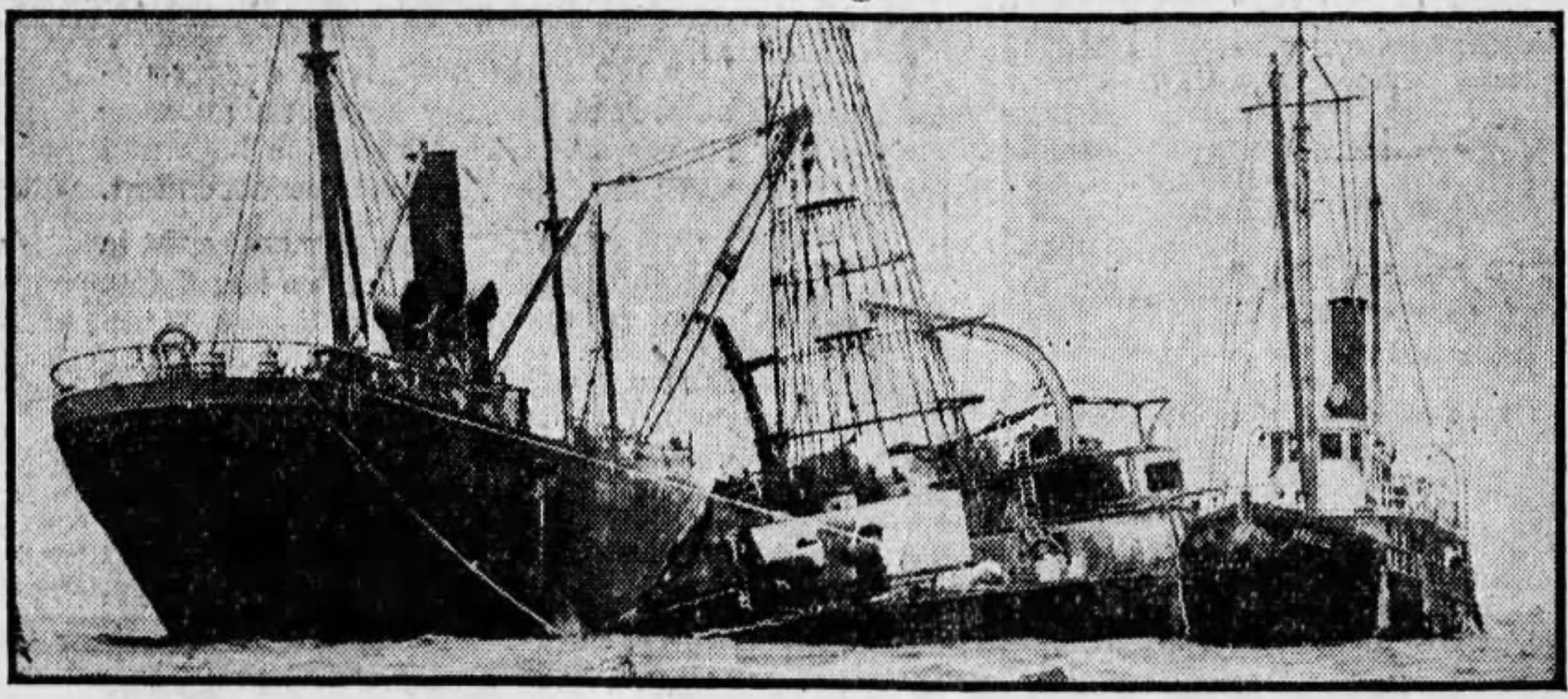
Arbutus, on right, during the salvage of the sunken ex-USS Alabama in 1926

The Union Shipbuilding Company developed a business of scrapping obsolete steel ships. It purchased Arbutus from M. Bloch and Son in December 1925 and used her to tow derelicts to its Baltimore shipyard. Her first assignment for her new owners was to pump out, refloat, and tow to port the burned and sunken steamer Lenape from near Lewes, Delaware. Perhaps her most newsworthy effort as a salvage steamer was assisting in refloating and scrapping of ex-USS Alabama, which was sunk as a target ship in Chesapeake Bay in 1921.

Federal documentation shows that Arbutus was "abandoned" sometime in 1935. Likely this means that she was scrapped by her owners, as both her wooden hull and steam engines were outmoded and worn down by nearly six decades of service.
