= USLHT Violet =

US Lighthouse Service Tender

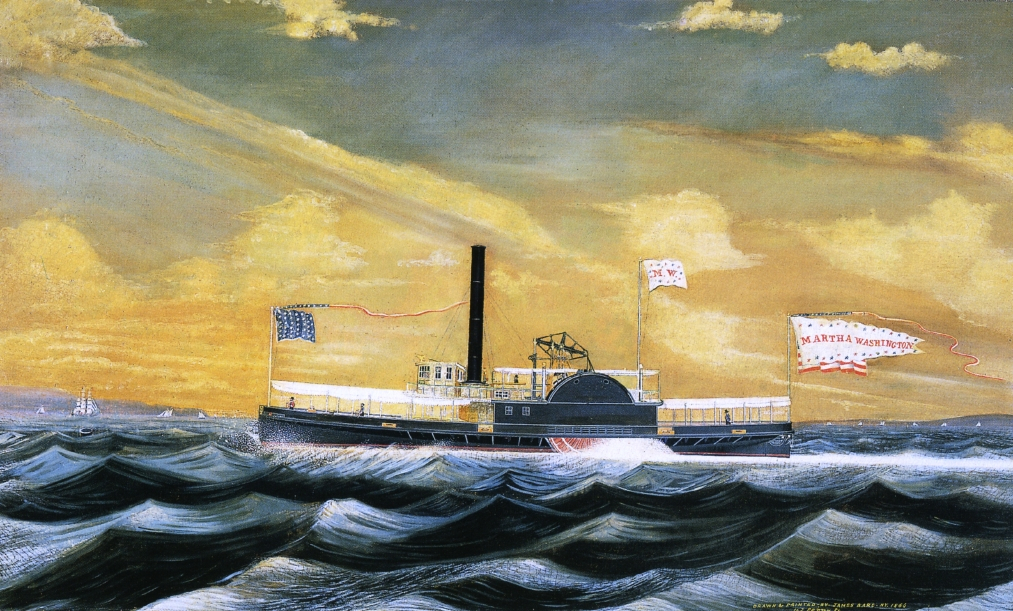
- Steamer Martha Washington in 1864

History

United States
- Name: Martha Washington
- Operator: E. R. Abrahams
- Cost: $13,000
- Launched: May 1864
- Home port: New York, New York
- Identification: Official Number 17015
- Fate: Sold 1870

United States
- Name: USLHT Violet
- Operator: US Lighthouse Service
- Cost: $16,826
- Identification: Signal Letters: GVMQ
- Fate: Sold November 1910

United States
- Name: Charles H. Werner
- Operator: Charles H. Werner
- Home port: Baltimore, Maryland
- Identification: Official Number 17015
- Fate: Sold 1919, converted to floating clubhouse

General characteristics as originally built
- Displacement: 116.5
- Length: 107 ft 4 in (32.72 m)
- Beam: 21.5 ft (6.6 m)
- Draft: 4.2 ft (1.3 m)
- Installed power: Coal-fired steam engine; 400 ihp (300 kW)
- Propulsion: Two side-mounted paddlewheels
- Speed: 10 knots (19 km/h; 12 mph)

USLHT Violet was a United States Lighthouse Service tender from 1870 to 1910. She was built in 1864 as a wooden-hulled, sidewheel steamship called Martha Washington. After her career with the Lighthouse Service, she was converted into an excursion boat called Charles H. Werner, sailing day trips out of Baltimore. In 1919 the ship was sold to the Maryland Motorboat Club, which removed her engine and boiler in order to convert her into a floating clubhouse.

During most of her government career, the Potomac River was part of her area of responsibility. This proximity to Washington, D.C. brought President Grover Cleveland aboard seven times during his second term, for relaxation, hunting, and fishing. The president's parties often included cabinet secretaries, and other high officials.

== Construction and characteristics ==
Ephraim R. Abrahams commissioned the construction of Martha Washington as an excursion boat. She was built in Staten Island, New York. Abrahams took delivery of the vessel in May 1864. Her value declared for tax purposes at the time was $13,000.

Martha Washington's hull was built of wood. She was 107 feet 4 inches (32.72 m) long overall, with a beam of 21.5 feet (6.6 m), a draft of 4.25 feet (1.30 m), and a depth of hold of 7.25 feet (2.21 m). Her displacement was 116.5 tons.

The ship was propelled by a coal-fired, walking-beam steam engine which produced 400 indicated horsepower. This engine drove paddlewheels on both sides of the ship.

== Excursion boat (1864–1870) ==
Abrahams sailed Martha Washington as an excursion boat in the waters around New York City, which was her homeport. During the summer of 1864, the ship ran fishing trips for the general public, and was chartered to groups such as the Freemasons and the YMCA for private events.

Martha Washington was chartered by the United States War Department to support its prosecution of the American Civil War. The charter began on December 23, 1864, and ended on July 6, 1865. The charter rate was $85 per day. There is no record of the ship participating in any combat, but there is one account of her evacuating wounded soldiers. Otherwise, it is likely that she provided routine logistical support to the Union Army in coastal Virginia and Maryland. The ship had a couple of notable assignments during her short Civil War career. In April 1865, Martha Washington carried General Ulysses S. Grant from Washington, D.C. to Fortress Monroe. In May 1865, the Union Army captured about five tons of Confederate government archives. These were transported to Washington, D.C. aboard Martha Washington.

Having returned from the South at the end of her War Department charter, Martha Washington resumed excursions around New York in July 1865. There were fishing trips for $2, with bait, lines, and refreshments aboard. A picnic and cotillion outing was also $2. These events continued through the summer of 1867.

On November 12, 1867, USLHT General Putnam was rammed and sunk in a dense fog by the steamer Major Reybold. In December 1867, the Lighthouse Service chartered a ship named Martha Washington to replace General Putnam while she was being repaired. While there were six Federally documented ships named Martha Washington at the time, it is likely that the ship which later served as USLHT Violet was the ship which was chartered. No advertisements for excursions aboard Martha Washington occurred in 1868, and one newspaper account during the period described the hired vessel as a "sidewheel steamer."

Excursion trips aboard Martha Washington began again in the summer of 1869. The ship brought spectators to sea to watch a race between America's Cup challenger Cambria and sailboats from the New York Yacht Club in September 1870.

== U.S. Lighthouse Service (1870–1910) ==
Martha Washington was purchased by the Lighthouse Service in 1870 for $16,826. United States buoy tenders are traditionally named for trees, shrubs, and flowering plants. Violet was renamed for the Violet, a type of flowering plant.

On April 28, 1871, the Lighthouse Board took bids for converting the excursion boat into a lighthouse tender. The shipyard of Enoch Moore, jr. in Wilmington, Delaware won the bid. The refit was complete by October 1871, and Violet was reported to have achieved a speed of 12 miles per hour (19 km/h) on Delaware Bay. One account reports that the ship was lengthened by 7 feet (2.1 m) at this time.

=== 4th Lighthouse District (1870-1879) ===
Violet was assigned to the inspector of the 4th Lighthouse District, which encompassed Delaware Bay and surrounding waters. She replaced USLHT Spray, a wooden schooner built in 1853. Violet's responsibilities were typical of tenders assigned to district inspectors of this era. She brought fuel, food, and other supplies to the 23 lighthouses in her area three or four times a year. She maintained the buoy fleet in the district. One of her larger jobs was removing steel nun and can buoys, which could be sunk by ice floes, and replacing them in the fall with wooden spar buoys. The process was reversed in the spring when the ice melted.

In 1877 Violet underwent a major overhaul which cost $12,000.

In 1879, while assigned to the 4th Lighthouse District, Violet had a crew of twelve men. The crew consisted of a captain, mate, first engineer, second engineer, two firemen, cook, steward, and six seamen.

As early as 1876 the Lighthouse Board judged Violet to be "entirely too small for the important work required of her." The Board was particularly concerned that two of the district's lightships were miles off the coast and that in a serious storm Violet would be sunk in the rough Atlantic. She was required to tow these ships back and forth to their stations for maintenance. Congress responded to the Board's concerns and the growth of the district's responsibilities by funding the construction of USLHT Arbutus, a larger, more powerful, propeller-driven ship. When Arbutus was commissioned in 1879, Violet was transferred to the 5th Lighthouse District. Violet's crew, however, was transferred to the new ship so as to retain their knowledge of local waters.

=== 5th Lighthouse District (1879-1910) ===
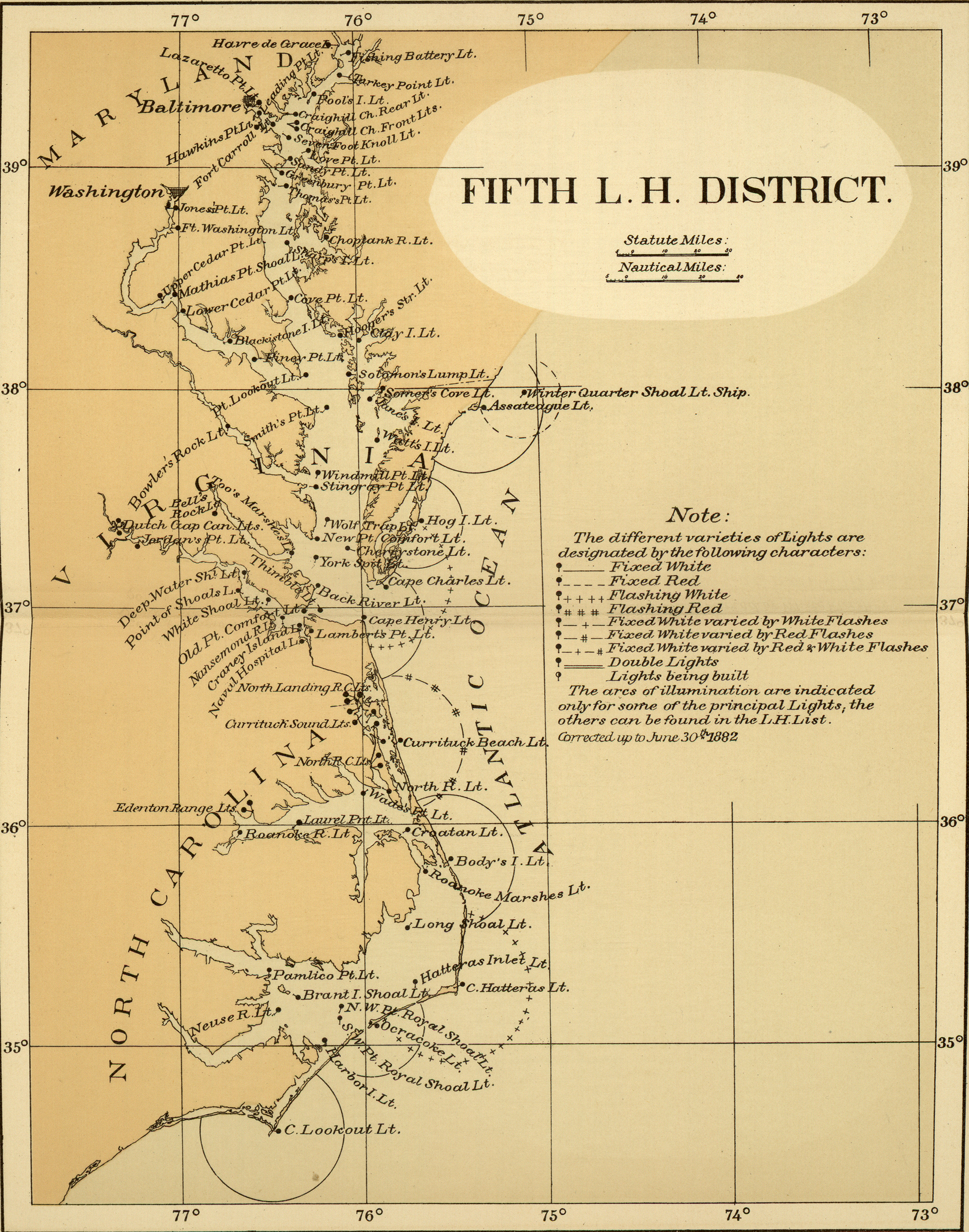
5th Lighthouse District, Violet's area from 1879 to 1910

In September, 1879 Violet was transferred to the 5th Lighthouse District, once again supporting the district inspector. She replaced the schooner USLHT Maggie, which was sold at auction. Captain William H. Perry of the Maggie was transferred to the Violet to take advantage of his local knowledge.

Her duties in the 5th district were similar to those she discharged in the 4th. Violet delivered personnel and supplies to lighthouses, maintained the buoy fleet, and towed lightships to their stations. Her area of responsibility included Chesapeake Bay, the North Carolina capes and sounds, and many of the tributary rivers including, the Potomac, York, and Rappahannock.

The Lighthouse Board reported the activities of its tenders in detail, which highlighted Violet's responsibilities in the 5th District. In fiscal year 1904, Violet steamed 8,950 miles. She worked on 332 buoys, and made 152 visits to lighthouses and lightships. She delivered 55 tons of coal, 54 cords of wood, and 2,700 cases of mineral oil, among other supplies, to her lighthouses.

On May 27, 1884, Violet was moored at the buoy depot at Portsmouth, Virginia, when the U.S. Navy tug Speedwell backed into her. Considerable damage was done to the starboard deck, rail, and house. Violet was sent to the shipyard for repairs. An almost identical accident occurred on June 7, 1909. While moored at the same dock, Violet was rammed by the Navy collier USS Brutus on her port side. Her paddle box was crushed, and her engine knocked off its mounts, among other damage. She was repaired at the Norfolk Navy Yard.

In January 1886 contracts were signed to substantially reconstruct Violet. The contract for work on her hull was won by the shipyard of William E. Woodall & Company in Baltimore for $19,950. Her hull was lengthened to 149 feet (45 m) overall (143 feet (44 m) between perpendiculars), her beam widened to 23.5 feet (7.2 m), and her depth of hold increased to 8.75 feet (2.67 m). Her full width, including her paddlewheel guards, was 42 feet (13 m). Her fully loaded draft increased to 7.5 feet (2.3 m). In this new configuration, her gross tonnage was 265, and her net tonnage was 155. During this shipyard visit her machinery was restored by H. A. Ramsey & Son of Baltimore. New paddlewheels and boiler were installed, and her engine overhauled. The contract price for this work was $5,400. The work was completed by mid-August 1886.

During maintenance in 1894, a new boiler manufactured by Charles Reeder & Sons of Baltimore was installed. William E. Woodall & Company built two additional staterooms, and installed a new rudder, and steering system. An Alco-vapor launch, 21 feet (6.4 m) long, was placed aboard Violet in 1900 so that her crew could work more effectively in shallow waters. A steam-powered generating set removed from USLHT Maple was installed on Violet in 1902 and the ship was wired for electric lights. In late 1903 a new boiler was installed and other repairs made at the shipyard of McIntyre & Henderson.

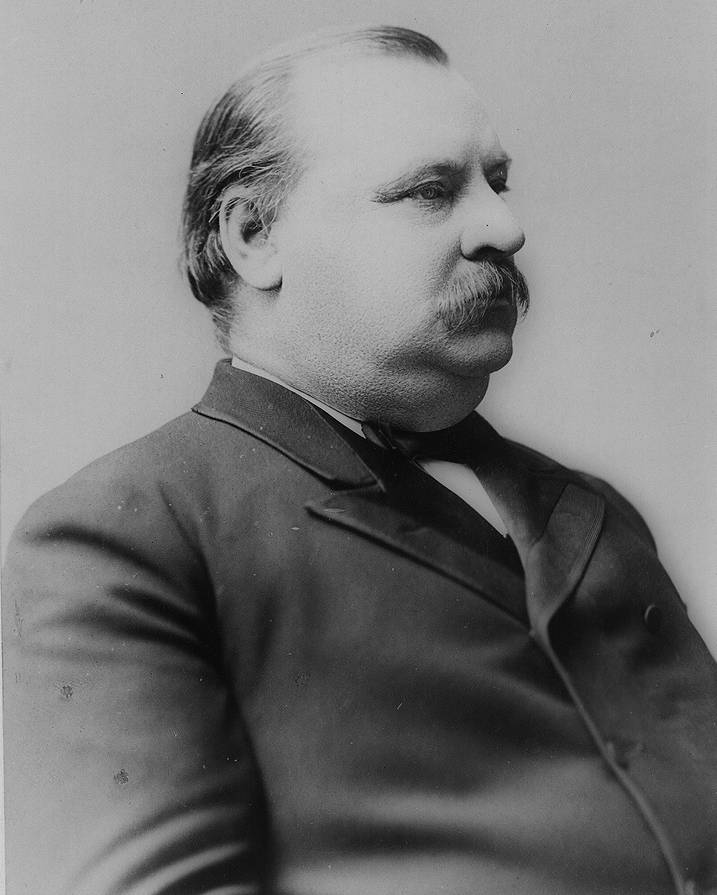
President Grover Cleveland, frequent passenger aboard Violet

Violet's proximity to Washington, D.C. converted her temporarily into a presidential yacht. President Grover Cleveland sailed on the ship seven times for relaxation during his second term, on most trips bird hunting and fishing. On December 26, 1893, the President, Secretary of State Walter Q. Gresham, Secretary of the Treasury John G. Carlisle, and the Naval Secretary of the Lighthouse Board, Captain Robley D. Evans boarded the ship in Washington, D.C. and cruised the Potomac. They returned on December 29, 1893. President Cleveland and Secretary Gresham were also aboard Violet in February 1894 for duck hunting on the Potomac. Cleveland, and secretaries Gresham and Carlisle were aboard for a shooting and fishing trip in May, 1894. The President sailed aboard Violet in March 1895, this time through the Albermarle and Chesapeake Canal to North Carolina waters. The President was duck hunting again aboard Violet in December 1895, accompanied by Captain George F. F. Wilde, Naval Secretary of the Lighthouse Board. Cleveland, Secretary Carlisle, and the Inspector of the 5th Lighthouse District, Captain Benjamin P. Lamberton, went fishing on the Potomac aboard Violet in June 1896. In March 1897, now out of office, Cleveland took a final hunting trip aboard Violet in the North Carolina sounds, once again accompanied by Lamberton. The use of the government ship for personal purposes generated some controversy, but Cleveland maintained that he and his party had paid for all of their food and drink, and that Violet continued her work servicing lighthouses and buoys while he was aboard.

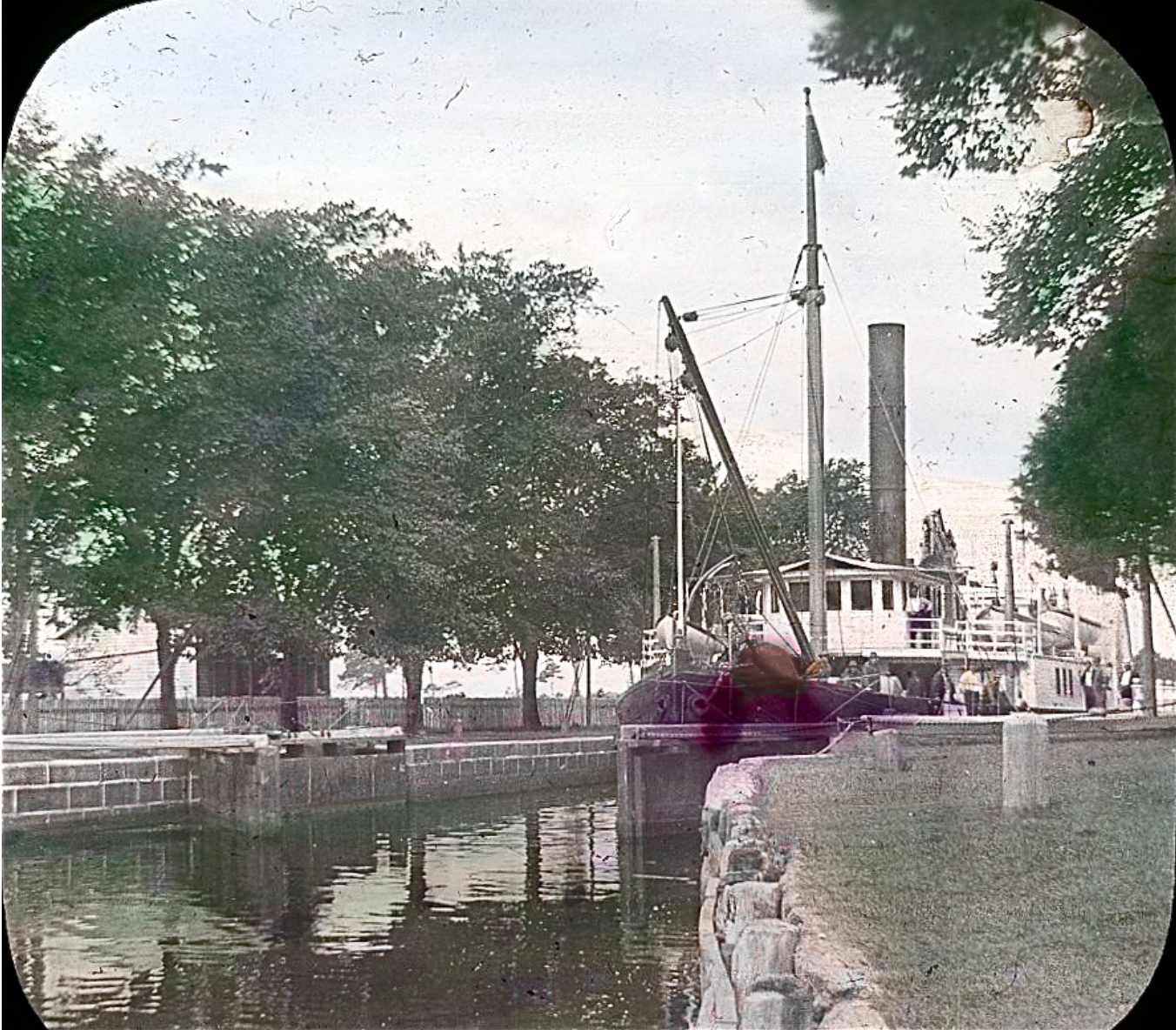
Violet in the Albermarle & Chesapeake Canal in 1901

Violet continued to serve high officials after Cleveland's term ended. Secretary of the Treasury Lyman J. Gage, his wife, the daughter of Secretary of Agriculture James Wilson, Congressman Francis G. Newlands, and others made a cruise of Chesapeake Bay during the July 4th, 1897 weekend.

=== Obsolescence and sale (1910–1911) ===
Congress passed a law reorganizing the Lighthouse Service in 1910. The Lighthouse Board was abolished and replaced by a Commissioner of Lighthouses. The district engineers, staffed by Army Corps of Engineers personnel, and the district inspectors, staffed by U.S. Navy personnel, were replaced by a single civilian district inspector in each district. The reorganization brought efficiencies which allowed the Lighthouse Service to sell four tenders, one of which was Violet. She was old, technologically obsolete, and unseaworthy. She was sold at public auction to Frank Samuels of Philadelphia for $1,025 on November 12, 1910. She was towed from Norfolk to Baltimore by the tug Dauntless in December 1910. Samuels sold her to Captain Levin S. Collison, who took bids for the ship in March, 1911. Only two bids were received, neither of which Collison accepted. Collison sold her to Charles H. Werner in June 1911.

== Charles H. Werner (1911–1919) ==
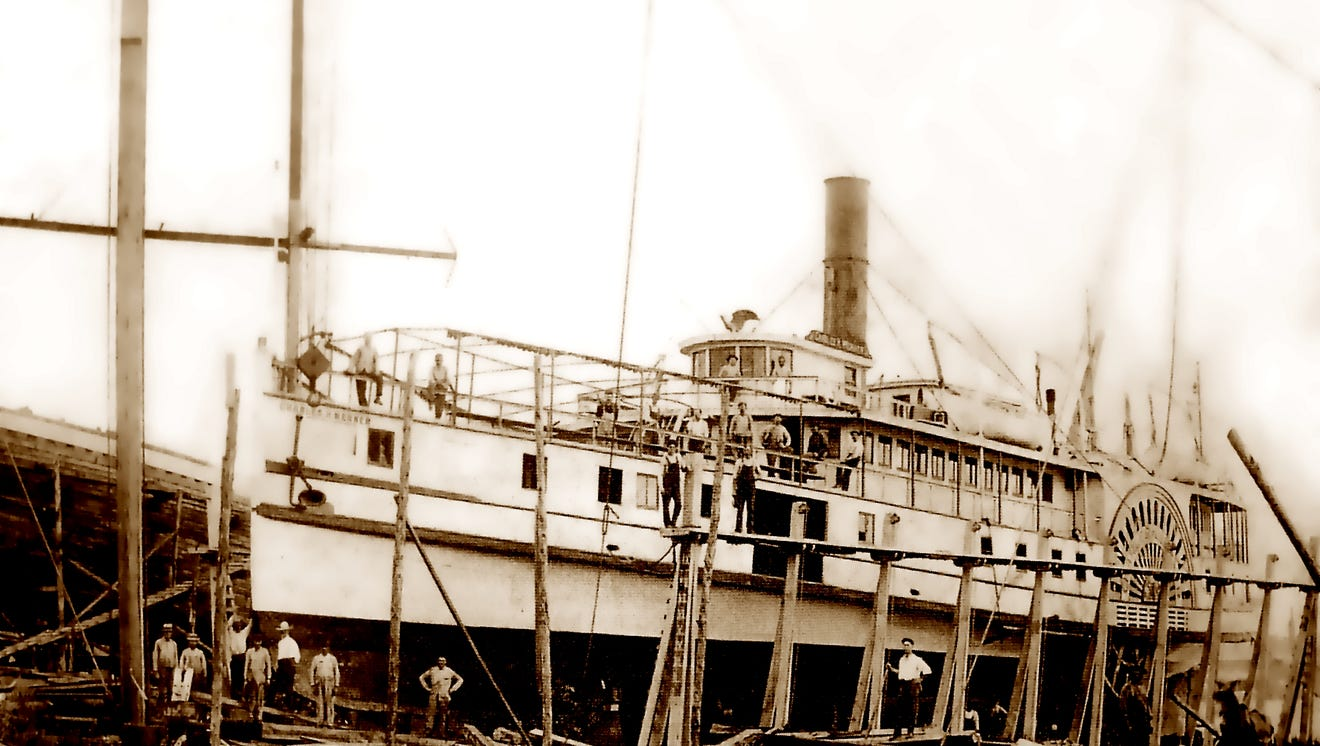
Charles H. Werner during her 1911 refit

Violet's new owner renamed the ship after himself. Werner had his new ship hauled out at the Seaford Marine Railway Company in Seaford, Delaware to convert the lighthouse tender into an excursion boat. The work was completed in August 1911. According to her Federal documentation, her basic dimensions remained the same as those of her 1886 rebuild. Her new home port was Baltimore, Maryland.

Werner ran an amusement park, Werner's Electric Park, in Westport, Maryland, and used the ship for excursion cruises. Business was good for a while. In 1915, the ship was fined $500 for carrying more passengers than she was licensed for. Charles H. Werner had 250 migrant farm laborers aboard on May 26, 1914, on their way to pick berries when she ran aground at the mouth of the Pocomoke River. The ship and her passengers were stranded there for three days until another steamship managed to pull her into deeper water. In 1915 the ship ran a regular route between Baltimore and Beauty Beach, a resort in Maryland for African-Americans.

Werner's Electric Park was denied a liquor license in 1915 and 1916, at least in part because it "was used almost exclusively by negroes". The last advertised sailings of Charles H. Werner were in 1916. Werner's business failed, and in January 1919 the ship was sold to the Maryland Motorboat Club for use as its floating clubhouse. The club removed the ship's engines and boiler, and remodeled her interior providing lockers, showers, dance floor, billiards room, storage for canoes, and other amenities.
