= Mayflower School District =

School district in Arkansas

Location
- 15 Old Sandy Road; Mayflower, Arkansas 72106 United States

District information
- Grades: PK–12
- Accreditation: Arkansas Department of Education
- Schools: 3
- NCES District ID: 0509450

Students and staff
- Students: 1,108
- Teachers: 83.73 (on FTE basis)
- Staff: 150.73 (on FTE basis)
- Student–teacher ratio: 13.23
- Athletic conference: 3A Region 2 (football); 3A Region 5 (basketball)
- District mascot: Eagle
- Colors: Purple; Gold

Other information
- Website: www.mayflower.school

Mayflower School District (MSD) is a public school district based in Mayflower, Faulkner County, Arkansas, United States. MSD supports more than 1,100 students in prekindergarten through grade 12 by employing more than 150 faculty and staff on a full time equivalent basis for its three schools.

The school district encompasses 76.73 square miles (198.7 km^{2}) of land in Faulkner County and serves the majority of the Mayflower city limits and portions of Conway.

== Schools ==
- Mayflower High School, serving grades 9 through 12.
- Mayflower Middle School, serving grades 5 through 8.
- Mayflower Ełementary School, serving prekindergarten through grade 4.
