= USS Mayflower (1897) =

United States Navy and Coast Guard vessel

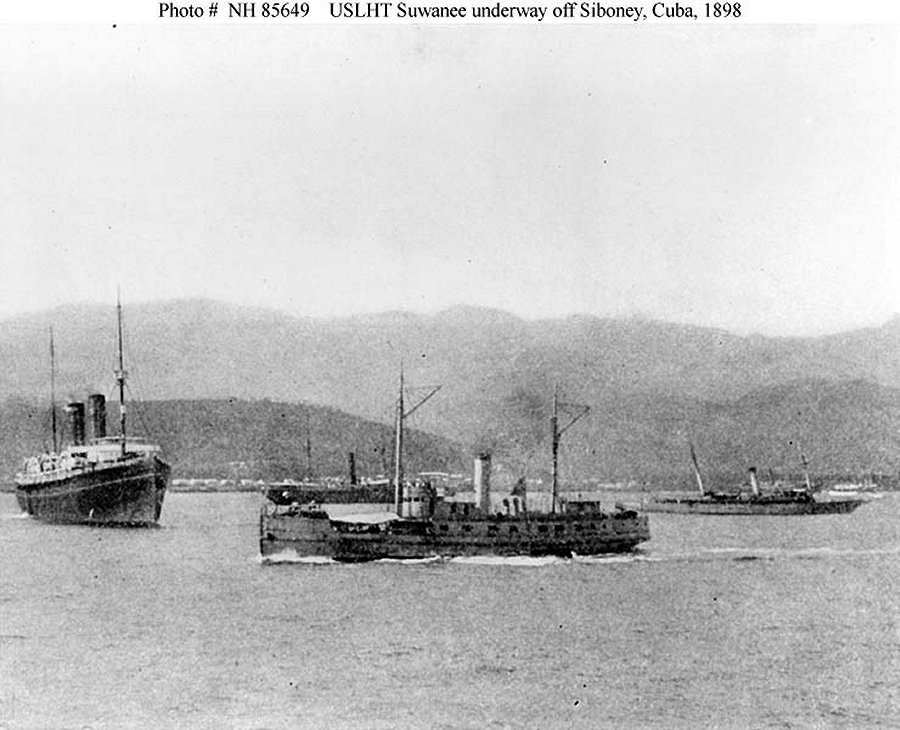
- USS Suwanee (ex-USLHT Mayflower) (center) underway off Siboney, Cuba, in 1898. The troop transport USS St. Louis is at left and the patrol yacht USS Vixen is at right.

History

United States
- Name: USLHT Mayflower
- Namesake: Mayflower
- Operator: U.S. Lighthouse Board
- Builder: Bath Iron Works, Bath, Maine
- Cost: USD $74,872
- Commissioned: November 1897
- Fate: Transferred to U.S. Navy 27 April 1898

United States
- Name: USS Suwanee
- Namesake: Suwannee River
- Operator: United States Navy
- Commissioned: 27 April 1898
- Decommissioned: December 1898
- Honors and awards: Cited for "conspicuous service" by the Department of the Navy
- Fate: Returned to the Lighthouse Service, December 1898

United States
- Name: USLHT Mayflower
- Operator: U.S. Lighthouse Board (1898–1910); U.S. Lighthouse Service (1910–1917)
- Recommissioned: December 1898
- Fate: Transferred to U.S. Navy 10 May 1917

United States
- Name: USS Mayflower
- Operator: U.S. Navy
- Recommissioned: 10 May 1917
- Fate: Returned to U.S. Lighthouse Service 1 July 1919

United States
- Name: USLHT Mayflower (1919–1939); USCGC Mayflower (1939)
- Operator: U.S. Lighthouse Service (1919–1939); U.S. Coast Guard (1939)
- Recommissioned: 1 July 1919
- Decommissioned: December 1939
- Fate: Transferred to Maritime Training Service December 1939

United States
- Name: USCGC Mayflower(WAGL-236) (1940–1943); USCGC Hydrangea (WAGL-236) (1943–1945)
- Namesake: Mayflower
- Operator: U.S. Coast Guard
- Recommissioned: July 1940
- Decommissioned: 8 October 1945
- Renamed: USCGC Hydrangea 15 August 1943
- Fate: Transferred to Maritime Commission for disposal and sold

General characteristics
- Type: Lighthouse tender (1897–1898; 1898–1917; 1919–1939; 1940–1945); Auxiliary cruiser (1898); Patrol vessel (1917–1919)
- Displacement: 630 tons (1897); 572 tons (1919); 821 tons (1945)
- Length: 164 ft 0 in (49.99 m)
- Beam: 30 feet 0 inches (9.14 m)
- Draft: 8 ft 1 in (2.46 m) (1897); 12 ft (3.7 m) (1919); 9 ft (2.7 m) (1945)
- Propulsion: Two Almy watertube coal-fired boilers, two 325 shaft horsepower (242 kW) Steeple compound reciprocating steam engines, two shafts
- Speed: 9.5 knots (17.6 km/h) (maximum); 8.5 knots (15.7 km/h) (cruising)
- Range: 1,000 nautical miles (1,900 kilometres) (1945)
- Complement: 29 (1897); 23 (1909); 29 (1919); 40 (1945)
- Armament: In 1945: Two 20 mm gun mounts, two depth charge tracks

The second USS Suwannee and third USS Mayflower was a United States Lighthouse Board, and later United States Lighthouse Service, lighthouse tender transferred to the United States Navy in 1898 for service as an auxiliary cruiser during the Spanish–American War and from 1917 to 1919 for service as a patrol vessel during World War I. She also served the Lighthouse Board and in the Lighthouse Service as USLHT Mayflower from 1897 to 1898, from 1898 to 1917, and from 1919 to 1939, and in the United States Coast Guard as the first USCGC Mayflower (WAGL-236) in 1939 and from 1940 to 1943 and as USCGC Hydrangea (WAGL-236) from 1943 to 1945.

== Construction and commissioning ==
USLHT Mayflower was a lighthouse tender built for the U.S. Lighthouse Board in 1897 by Bath Iron Works in Bath, Maine. The Lighthouse Board commissioned her in November 1897.

== Service history ==
=== Spanish–American War ===
Just after the Spanish–American War broke out in April 1898, Mayflower was transferred to the U.S. Navy on 27 April 1898 for use as an auxiliary cruiser. She was renamed USS Suwannee to avoid confusion with the patrol yacht USS Mayflower, which also had been acquired for war service. Suwannee′s war service included a brief period as the flagship of the commander of the naval base at Key West, Florida, Commodore George C. Remey.

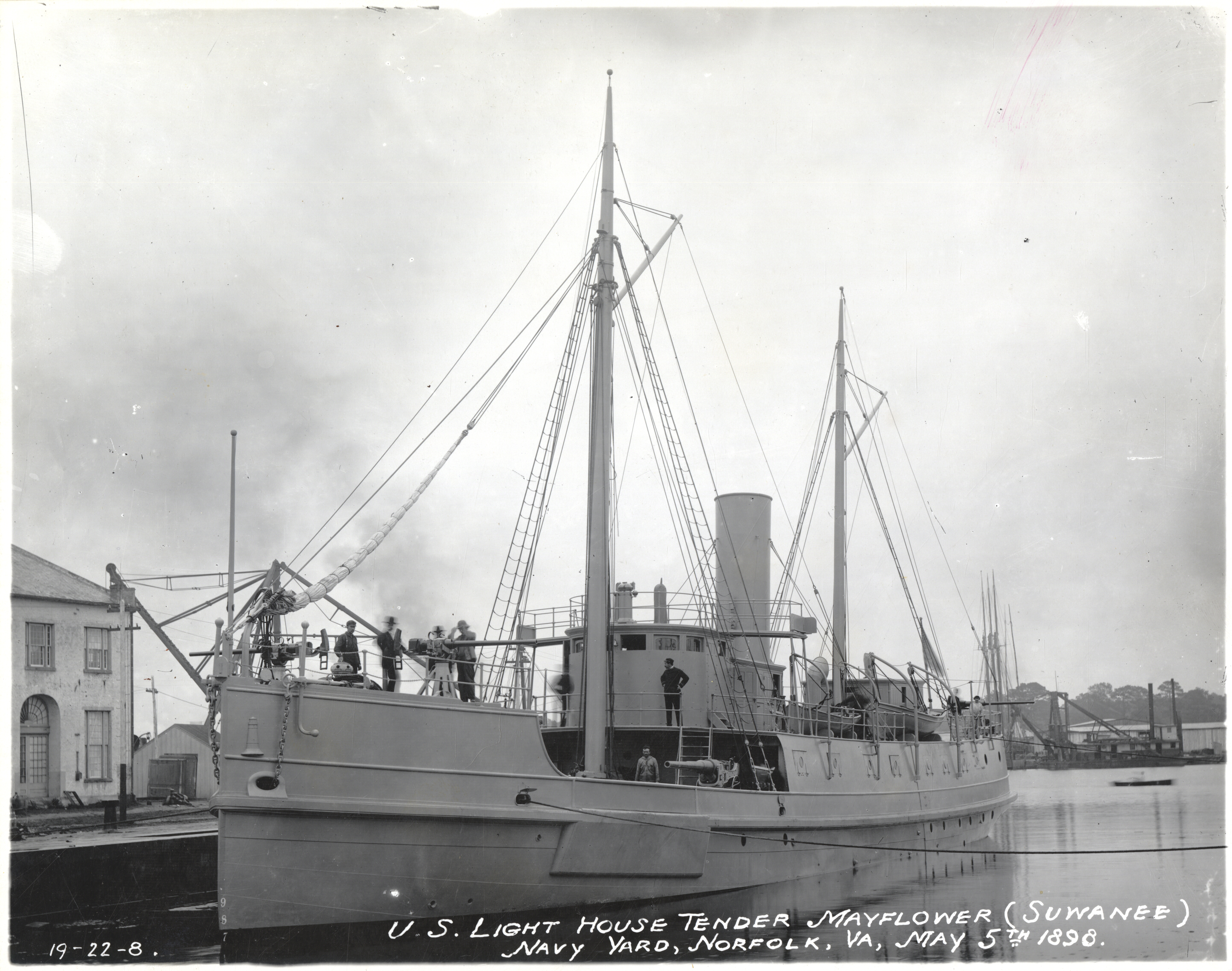
USS Suwannee just after her transfer to the Navy in 1898

On 11 June 1898, Lieutenant Victor Blue of Suwannee went ashore on the south coast of Cuba to conduct a visual reconnaissance of Santiago Bay at Santiago de Cuba and determine what ships were anchored there. A member of the Cuban insurgency guided him through the Spanish lines, and on 12 June 1898 he identified the Spanish Navy′s 1st Squadron, under the command of Vice Admiral Pascual Cervera y Topete, as being in the bay. His report confirmed for the first time that all of Cervera's squadron was in the bay, and this freed up the U.S. Navy's heavy ships from searching the Caribbean for Cervera's ships or escorting troop convoys carrying the United States Army′s Fifth Army Corps from Tampa, Florida, to Cuba, allowing the ships instead to concentrate off the harbor and reinforce the U.S. blockade of Santiago de Cuba.

On 10 June 1898, during the Battle of Guantánamo Bay, United States Marine Corps forces had landed at Guantánamo Bay on the south coast of Cuba to seize it for use as a forward base for coaling and as an anchorage for use during bad weather. On 15 June 1898, Suwannee joined the battleship USS Texas and the unprotected cruiser USS Marblehead in providing gunfire support for the Marines as they consolidated the American position at Guantánamo Bay. On 1 July 1898, during the Battle of the Aguadores, Suwannee, the armored cruiser USS New York, and the gunboat USS Gloucester provided gunfire support for U.S. Army forces advancing against Spanish Army positions on the Aguadores River.

When not otherwise engaged, Suwannee took part in the blockade of Cervera's squadron at Santiago Bay. She operated′ on a night station 2 nautical miles (3.7 km; 2.3 mi) from Castillo de San Pedro de la Roca as part of a picket line watching for any attempt by the Spanish destroyers Furor and Spanish destroyer Plutón (Plutón) to sortie from the bay and launch a torpedo attack against the blockading U.S. ships. However, when Cervera's squadron finally emerged from Santiago Bay on 3 July 1898, resulting in its annihilation in the Battle of Santiago de Cuba, Suwannee was among ships coaling at Guantánamo Bay, and she therefore missed the battle.

On 12 August 1898, the protected cruiser USS Newark, auxiliary cruiser USS Resolute, armed yacht USS Hist, armed tug USS Osceola, gunboat USS Alvarado, and Suwannee – with the First Battalion of Marines embarked aboard Newark and Resolute – arrived at Manzanillo, Cuba, and demanded that Spanish forces there surrender. The Spanish refused, and the U.S. ships responded with a bombardment of Spanish positions. At daybreak on 13 August, the U.S. ships observed a large number of white flags flying from the Spanish blockhouses and batteries at Manzanillo, and a Spanish boat came out from the shore carrying a flag of truce. The boat's captain gave the senior U.S. officer present a cipher dispatch from the United States Department of the Navy stating that the U.S. President William McKinley had signed a peace agreement and proclaimed an armistice, bringing the war to an end.

Suwannee was decommissioned on 23 September 1898 and transferred back to the Lighthouse Board in December 1898. The United States Department of the Navy cited her for "conspicuous service" during the war.

=== 1899–1917 ===
The Lighthouse Board rechristened the ship USLHT Mayflower and placed her in service as a lighthouse tender maintaining aids to navigation in the 2nd Lighthouse District, with her home port at Boston, Massachusetts. The Lighthouse Board was abolished in 1910 and replaced by the new United States Lighthouse Service, making Mayflower part of the Lighthouse Service.

=== World War I ===
After the United States entered World War I in April 1917, Mayflower again was transferred to the Navy and was commissioned on 10 May 1917 for use as a patrol vessel. She patrolled the Atlantic Ocean off the United States East Coast during the war. After the war ended in November 1918, she was returned to the Lighthouse Service by executive order on 1 July 1919.

=== 1919–1939 ===
After returning to the Lighthouse Service, Mayflower again operated in the 2nd Lighthouse District. In 1924, she transferred to the 5th Lighthouse District, where she replaced USLHT Arbutus. On 1 July 1939 the Lighthouse Service was abolished and merged into the United States Coast Guard, and therefore the ship became USCGC Mayflower as a Coast Guard vessel. In December 1939, the Coast Guard decommissioned Mayflower and transferred her to the Maritime Training Service in Boston, Massachusetts.

=== World War II ===
When World War II in Europe created a pressing need for tenders, the Coast Guard recommissioned the ship in July 1940 as USCGC Mayflower (WAGL-236) and based her at Norfolk, Virginia. The Coast Guard, which operated under the control of the U.S. Navy during World War II, renamed her Hydrangea on 15 August 1943 to again avoid a naming conflict with the same USS Mayflower (PY-1), which had returned to Navy service once again as a patrol craft.

== Final disposition ==
Hydrangea was decommissioned on 8 October 1945 and transferred to the Maritime Commission for disposal. She was later sold. She is one of the very few ships to have seen service in the Spanish–American War as well as both world wars.

== Awards ==
- Spanish Campaign Medal
- World War I Victory Medal
- American Campaign Medal
- World War II Victory Medal
