= Mayflower, Arkansas =

- City
- Flag Logo

- Location of Mayflower in Faulkner County, Arkansas.
- Coordinates: 34°58′5″N 92°25′11″W
- Country: United States
- State: Arkansas
- County: Faulkner

Government
  - Mayor: Zack Jeffrey

Area
  - City: 4.05 sq mi (10.50 km^{2})
  - Land: 3.94 sq mi (10.20 km^{2})
  - Water: 0.12 sq mi (0.30 km^{2})
- Elevation: 282 ft (86 m)

Population (2020)
  - City: 1,984
  - Estimate (2025): 2,372 ▲
  - Density: 503.6/sq mi (194.44/km^{2})
  - Metro: 748,031
- Time zone: UTC-6 (Central (CST))
  - Summer (DST): UTC-5 (CDT)
- ZIP code: 72106
- Area code: 501
- FIPS code: 05-44750
- GNIS feature ID: 2405041
- Website: mayflowerar.gov

Mayflower is a city in Faulkner County, Arkansas, United States. As of the 2020 census, Mayflower had a population of 1,984. It is located in the Central Arkansas region.

== History ==
Mayflower is a small town located along Interstate 40 southeast of Conway (Faulkner County) and northwest of Little Rock (Pulaski County). Located on the southwestern edge of Lake Conway, Mayflower is particularly known for its fishing. Like many of the smaller towns of Faulkner County, such as Vilonia and Greenbrier, Mayflower offers a rural lifestyle within a short drive of Conway and Little Rock, where many of its residents commute to work. It was incorporated as a town in Arkansas on March 6, 1928.

The area's earliest European settlers were Loyalists, known then as Tories, who moved westward in order to flee the Revolutionary War. Families such as the Flannagins and Massengills arrived around 1778 and settled near the mouth of Palarm Creek. However, local tribes of Native Americans had inhabited this region for centuries, principally the Quapaw. Yet, other indigenous groups were in this area now known as part of the Great Plains Cultural Area.

Like most of Arkansas, the land was heavily wooded and was therefore logged extensively until the turn of the twentieth century. Cotton plantations existed during the American Civil War owing to the river bottom's fertile soil. This would later give way to sharecroppers and modern farming. This presents the largest source of the local economy today, although some small businesses exist in the town.

Franklin Pearce, who was first elected in 1999, was the first mayor that was elected for two terms. He was replaced by Danny Hester. The current mayor is Zack Jeffrey.

The 2013 Mayflower oil spill occurred on March 29, 2013, when an ExxonMobil pipeline carrying heavy crude oil ruptured near Mayflower, spilling thousands of barrels of oil. This caused the evacuation of 22 homes as well as extensive damage to other local properties and the local ecosystem.

=== 2014 tornado ===
Mayflower was hit by a violent EF4 tornado before 8:00 p.m. on April 27, 2014.

== Geography ==
Mayflower is located in southern Faulkner County. The Interstate 40/US 65 freeway passes along the eastern edge of the city, with access from Exit 135 (Arkansas Highway 89). I-40 leads southeast 20 miles (32 km) to Little Rock, the state capital, and north 10 miles (16 km) to Conway, the Faulkner County seat.

Mayflower has a total area of 4.0 square miles (10.4 km^{2}), of which 4.0 square miles (10.3 km^{2}) is land and 0.04 square miles (0.1 km^{2}), or 1.18%, is water.

== Demographics ==
Historical population
Census	Pop.	Note	%±
1930	188		—
1940	165		−12.2%
1950	293		77.6%
1960	355		21.2%
1970	469		32.1%
1980	1,381		194.5%
1990	1,415		2.5%
2000	1,631		15.3%
2010	2,234		37.0%
2020	1,984		−11.2%
2025 (est.)	2,372	▲	19.6%
U.S. Decennial Census

Mayflower is part of the Little Rock–North Little Rock–Conway Metropolitan Statistical Area.

=== 2020 census ===
As of the 2020 census, Mayflower had a population of 1,984. The median age was 44.8 years. 20.1% of residents were under the age of 18 and 21.2% of residents were 65 years of age or older. For every 100 females, there were 99.8 males, and for every 100 females age 18 and over, there were 98.5 males.

85.7% of residents lived in urban areas, while 14.3% lived in rural areas.

There were 837 households in Mayflower, including 480 family households. Of all households, 29.5% had children under the age of 18 living in them, 51.9% were married-couple households, 21.1% were households with a male householder and no spouse or partner present, and 22.8% were households with a female householder and no spouse or partner present. About 26.8% of all households were made up of individuals, and 12.1% had someone living alone who was 65 years of age or older.

There were 950 housing units, of which 11.9% were vacant. The homeowner vacancy rate was 3.0%, and the rental vacancy rate was 7.0%.

Mayflower racial composition
Race	Number	Percentage
White (non-Hispanic)	1,696	85.48%
Black or African American (non-Hispanic)	122	6.15%
Native American	9	0.45%
Asian	6	0.3%
Pacific Islander	1	0.05%
Other/Mixed	111	5.59%
Hispanic or Latino	39	1.97%

=== 2000 census ===
As of the census of 2000, there were 1,631 people, 740 households, and 500 families residing in the city. The population density was 556.8 inhabitants per square mile (215.0/km^{2}). There were 872 housing units at an average density of 297.7 per square mile (114.9/km^{2}). The racial makeup of the city was 95.16% White, 3.37% Black or African American, 0.31% Native American, 0.06% Asian, 0.25% from other races, and 0.86% from two or more races. 0.67% of the population were Hispanic or Latino of any race.

There were 740 households, out of which 20.7% had children under the age of 18 living with them, 53.8% were married couples living together, 10.0% had a female householder with no husband present, and 32.4% were non-families. 27.8% of all households were made up of individuals, and 11.6% had someone living alone who was 65 years of age or older. The average household size was 2.20 and the average family size was 2.66.

In the city, the population was spread out, with 17.5% under the age of 18, 7.2% from 18 to 24, 24.3% from 25 to 44, 30.9% from 45 to 64, and 20.1% who were 65 years of age or older. The median age was 46 years. For every 100 females, there were 92.6 males. For every 100 females age 18 and over, there were 93.0 males.

The median income for a household in the city was $35,469, and the median income for a family was $39,013. Males had a median income of $29,821 versus $23,102 for females. The per capita income for the city was $19,889. About 7.0% of families and 8.6% of the population were below the poverty line, including 9.1% of those under age 18 and 14.0% of those age 65 or over.

== Education ==
The majority of Mayflower is in the Mayflower School District. A small portion to the north is in the Conway Public Schools school district.
