= List of lighthouses in Florida =

This is a list of existing and past lighthouses in the state of Florida in the United States.

Name	Image	Location	Coordinates	Year first lit	Automated	Year deactivated	Current lens	Focal height	Notes
Alligator Reef Light		Islamorada	24°51′6″N 80°37′6″W	1873	1963	2015 (Replaced)	VRB-25	136 ft (41 m)	
Amelia Island Light		Fernandina Beach (Amelia Island)	30°40′23.46″N 81°26′32.8″W	1838	1970	Active	Third-order Fresnel	107 ft (33 m)	
Amelia Island North Range Light		St. Mary's River (Mouth)	30°42′09″N 81°26′26″W	1858 (First); 1872 (Last)	Never	1899	None	30 ft (9.1 m)	Destroyed by 1924 Cuba hurricane
American Shoal Light		Saddlebunch Keys	24°31′30″N 81°31′12″W	1880	1963	2015 (Replaced)	VRB-25	109 ft (33 m)	
Anclote Keys Light		Tarpon Springs (Anclote Key)	28°10′01.11″N 82°50′40.74″W	1887	1952	Active (Inactive: 1984–2003)	Fourth-order Fresnel (Replica)	110 ft (34 m)	
Cape Canaveral Light (Old)	left tower	Cape Canaveral (Cape Canaveral Space Force Station)	28°27′36.8″N 80°31′37.9″W	1848	Never	1868 (Demolished in 1893)	None	60 ft (18 m)	
Cape Canaveral Light (New)		Cape Canaveral (Cape Canaveral Space Force Station)	28°27′37.26″N 80°32′36.42″W	1868	1960	Active	DCB-224	137 ft (42 m)	
Cape Florida Light		Cape Florida	25°39′59.72″N 80°09′21.47″W	1825 (First); 1847 (Current)	1978	Active (Inactive: 1878–1978)	300mm	95 ft (29 m)	
Cape San Blas Light		Cape San Blas	29°40′16.41″N 85°21′22.72″W	1848 (First); 1885 (Current)	1981	1996	None	101 ft (31 m)	
Cape St. George Light (Old)		Cape St. George Island (Apalachicola Bay)	29°35′15.2″N 85°02′49.32″W	1852	1949	2005 (Collapsed)	None	72 ft (22 m)	
Cape St. George Light (New)		Cape St. George Island (Apalachicola Bay)	29°39′46.1″N 84°51′45.2″W	2008 (Replica)	Always	Active	Third-order Fresnel (Replica)	72 ft (22 m)	
Carysfort Reef Light		Key Largo (Carysfort Reef)	25°13′18″N 80°12′42″W	1852	1962	2014	None	100 ft (30 m)	
Cedar Key Light		Cedar Key	29°05′47.33″N 83°03′55″W	1854	Never	1915	None	75 ft (23 m)	
Charlotte Harbor Light		Punta Gorda	26°45′35″N 82°06′29″W	1890	1918	1943 (Demolished)	None	36 ft (11 m)	
Cosgrove Shoal Light	N/A	Marquesas Keys	24°27′28.44″N 82°11′6.16″W	1935	Always	Active	200mm	54 ft (16 m)	
Crooked River Light		Carrabelle (Dog Island)	29°49′39″N 84°42′04″W	1895	1952	Active (Inactive: 1995–2007)	Fourth-order Fresnel (Replica)	115 ft (35 m)	
Dames Point Light	N/A	Jacksonville	30°23′00″N 81°33′16″W	1872	Never	1893 (Destroyed in 1913)	None	35 ft (11 m)	
Dog Island Light		Carrabelle (Dog Island)	29°47′N 84°40′W	1839 (First); 1872 (Last)	Never	1873 (Destroyed and replaced)	None	70 ft (21 m)	
Dry Tortugas Light		Loggerhead Key (Dry Tortugas)	24°38′00″N 82°55′12″W	1858	1988	Active	VRB-25	151 ft (46 m)	
Egmont Key Light		St. Petersburg (Tampa Bay)	27°36′03″N 82°45′39″W	1848 (First); 1858 (Current)	1990	Active	DCB-24	85 ft (26 m)	
Fowey Rocks Light		Key Biscayne	25°35′26.25″N 80°05′48.24″W	1878	1975	Active	VRB-25	110 ft (34 m)	
Garden Key Light		Fort Jefferson (Dry Tortugas National Park)	24°37′41″N 82°52′20″W	1826 (First); 1877 (Current)	1912	1924	Decorative	70 ft (21 m)	
Gasparilla Island Light		Boca Grande	26°43′02″N 82°15′39″W	1932	1956	1966	None	105 ft (32 m)	
Hen and Chickens Shoal Light	N/A	Plantation Key	24°55′58.69″N 80°32′55.36″W	1929	Always	Active	Acetylene	35 ft (11 m)	
Hillsboro Inlet Light		Hillsboro Beach (Hillsboro Inlet)	26°15′33″N 80°04′51″W	1907	1974	Active	Second-order Fresnel	136 ft (41 m)	
Jupiter Inlet Light		Jupiter	26°56′55″N 80°04′55″W	1860	1928	Active	First-order Fresnel	146 ft (45 m)	
Key West Light		Key West	24°33′2.16″N 81°48′2.52″W	1826 (First); 1849 (Current)	1915	1969 (Now a museum)	None	91 ft (28 m)	
Kissimmee Lighthouse		Kissimmee	28°17′19.0″N 81°24′19.1″W	1999	Always	Active	Unknown	22 ft (6.7 m)	
Molasses Reef Light		Key Largo (Molasses Reef)	25°00′42.66″N 80°22′35.31″W	1921	Always	Active	Unknown	45 ft (14 m)	
Northwest Passage Light		Key West	24°37′8.31″N 81°53′56.71″W	1855 (First); 1879 (Last)	1911	1971 (Destroyed)	None	47 ft (14 m)	
Pacific Reef Light		Elliott Key	25°22′15.55″N 80°08′31.41″W	1921	Always	Active	Unknown	44 ft (13 m)	
Pensacola Light		Pensacola (Pensacola Bay)	30°20′47″N 87°18′29″W	1824 (First); 1859 (Current)	1965	Active	First-order Fresnel	191 ft (58 m)	
Ponce de Leon Inlet Light		Ponce Inlet	29°04′49″N 80°55′41″W	1887	1953	Active (Inactive: 1970–1982)	Third-order Fresnel	159 ft (48 m)	
Port Boca Grande Light		Boca Grande (Gasparilla Island)	26°43′02″N 82°15′39″W	1890	1956	Active (Inactive: 1966–1986)	377mm	41 ft (12 m)	
Pulaski Shoal Light		Key West	24°41′36.02″N 82°46′22.79″W	1935 (First); Unknown (Current)	Always	Active	Unknown	49 ft (15 m)	
Rebecca Shoal Light		Marquesas Keys	24°34′42″N 82°35′06″W	1886	1926	1953 (Demolished)	None	66 ft (20 m)	
Sand Key Light		Key West	24°27′14.18″N 81°52′39.02″W	1827 (First); 1853 (Current)	1941	2014 (Replaced)	VRB-25	109 ft (33 m)	
Sanibel Island Light		Sanibel	26°27′10.51″N 82°00′51.32″W	1884	1949	Active	190mm	98 ft (30 m)	
Smith Shoal Light	N/A	Key West	24°43′5.82″N 81°55′17.54″W	1933 (First); Unknown (Current)	Always	Active	Unknown	49 ft (15 m)	
Sombrero Key Light		Marathon	24°37′40.46″N 81°06′41.78″W	1858	1960	2015 (Replaced)	None	142 ft (43 m)	
St. Augustine Light (Old)		St. Augustine (Anastasia Island)	N/A	1824^{A}	Never	1874 (Destroyed in 1880)	None	52 ft (16 m)	
St. Augustine Light (New)		St. Augustine (Anastasia Island)	29°53′08″N 81°17′19″W	1874	1955	Active	First-order Fresnel	161 ft (49 m)	
St. Johns Light		Atlantic Beach	30°23′10″N 81°23′53″W	1954	1967	Active	VRB-25	83 ft (25 m)	
St. Johns River Light		Atlantic Beach	30°23′36.77″N 81°25′33.49″W	1830 (First); 1858 (Last)	Never	1929	None	81 ft (25 m)	
St. Joseph Bay Light	N/A	St. Joseph Peninsula	29°53′N 85°23′W	1839	Never	1847^{B} (Lens moved)	None	50 ft (15 m)	
St. Joseph Point Rear Range Light		Apalachicola (St. Joseph Bay)	29°55′5.67″N 85°22′49.79″W	1902	Never	1960^{C}	None	78 ft (24 m)	
St. Marks Light (Old)		St. Marks	N/A	1831	Never	1842 (Demolished)	None	65 ft (20 m)	
St. Marks Light (New)		St. Marks	30°04′19″N 84°10′48″W	1842	1960	Active	Unknown	82 ft (25 m)	
Tennessee Reef Light		Long Key	24°44′45.88″N 80°46′56.47″W	1933	Always	Active	Unknown	49 ft (15 m)	
Volusia Bar Light		Lake George	29°12′24″N 81°34′46″W	1886	Never	1916 (Destroyed in 1974)	None	34 ft (10 m)	

== See also ==
- Unmanned reef lights of the Florida Keys
- List of lighthouses in the United States
- List of lighthouses in the United States by height
- Maritime history of Florida

== Notes ==
A. The first tower was built around 1737. Archival records are inconclusive as to whether the Spanish used the tower as a lighthouse. While it seems likely, not enough has been gathered to place it as a fact.
B. The tower was washed away in 1851.
C. In 1960, the lighthouse was replaced with a skeletal steel tower. The old structure moved multiple times as a private residence before it was returned to St. Joseph Bay in 1979. While the old light remains a private residence, its current owner has restored its former appearance with a rebuilt lantern room.

== Sources ==
- National Park Service, "Inventory of Historic Light Stations - Florida Lighthouses". Maritime Heritage Program. Retrieved on 2010-09-28.
- U.S. Coast Guard (USCG) (2012), "Light List Vol. III, Atlantic and Gulf Coasts". U.S. Government Printing Office, Washington D.C.
- "Historic Light Station Information and Photography: Florida". United States Coast Guard Historian's Office. Archived from the original on May 1, 2017.
- "Florida Lighthouse Page". Web Archive. Retrieved on 2010-09-28.
