= St. Joseph Point Light =

Lighthouse in Florida, US

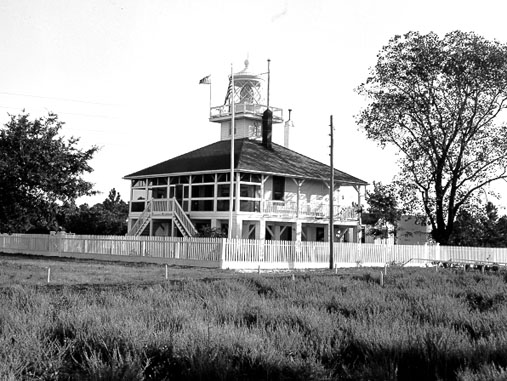
- The St. Joseph Point Rear Range Light
- Location: near Port St. Joe, Florida
- Coordinates: 29°55′5.668″N 85°22′42.794″W

Tower
- Construction: wood
- Height: 41 feet (12 m)
- Shape: 2 story square house with verandas

Light
- First lit: 1902
- Deactivated: 1960
- Lens: third order

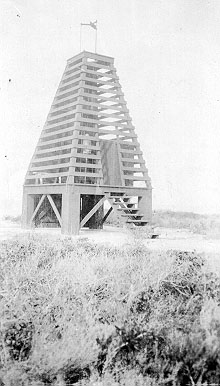
The St. Joseph Point Front Range Light

The St. Joseph Point Light was a lighthouse on the mainland north of present-day Port St. Joe, Florida, across the entrance to St. Joseph Bay from St. Joseph Point. St. Joseph Bay is enclosed by St. Joseph Peninsula, which runs west some three miles (5 km) from the mainland to Cape San Blas, and then northerly 15 miles (24 km) to St. Joseph Point. An earlier light in the area was the St. Joseph Bay Light.

== St. Joseph Bay Light ==
St. Joseph Bay is one of the best natural harbors on the Gulf Coast of the United States, and the town of St. Joseph was founded in its shores in 1836. Unfortunately for the town, no rivers flow into St. Joseph Bay. In an attempt to capture some of the freight that shipped out of Apalachicola, two railroads were constructed from St. Joseph to the Apalachicola River, including the Lake Wimico and St. Joseph Canal and Railroad.

Also in 1836, the Legislative Council of the Territory of Florida petitioned Congress for a lighthouse to mark the entrance to St. Joseph Bay. The St. Joseph Bay lighthouse was approved, and was erected on St. Joseph Point, at the end the St. Joseph Peninsula, entering service in early 1839. The lighthouse was a 55-foot (17 m) white conical brick tower, with 15 lamps with 16-inch (410 mm) reflectors at a height of 50 feet (15 m).

In the meantime the town of St. Joseph had boomed, and hosted the 1838 convention to draft Florida's first constitution. However, in 1841 a ship brought yellow fever to St. Joseph. The disease killed many, and caused others to flee from the town. In 1843 a hurricane with a large storm surge destroyed the town. The site was abandoned for more than 50 years. In the 20th century the city of Port St. Joe was established about two miles (3 km) north of the site of old St. Joseph.

A petition was submitted in 1842 to close the St. Joseph Bay lighthouse, but it remained in service until 1847, when the lighthouse lantern and other equipment were moved to the new Cape San Blas lighthouse. The old St. Joseph Bay lighthouse was washed away in 1851.

== St. Joseph Point (Beacon Hill) Light ==
Increasing activity in St. Joseph Bay, and the dangerous waters around St. Joseph Peninsula, led to calls for reactivation of a light for the entrance to St. Joseph Bay. After several recommendations from the Lighthouse Board, Congress approved a new lighthouse in 1898. The Lighthouse Board decided to place the new light at Beacon Hill on the mainland. The official name for the new light was St. Joseph Light Range Station. It was also known as the Beacon Hill Light, and is now called the St. Joseph Point Light by the Coast Guard. (Note that the St. Joseph Bay Light was on St. Joseph Point, while the St. Joseph Point Light is on the mainland.)

The new light station was completed in 1902. The light station at Beacon Hill consisted of two lights. The Rear Range Light was a square wooden house with a hip roof and the lantern at the peak of the roof. The Front Range Light was a wooden pyramidal tower 600 feet (180 m) seaward of the Rear Range Light. The house was raised above the ground, and the area under the house had work and storage rooms. The under part was later completely enclosed and used as barracks for troops who patrolled the shore in the area during World War II. The light station was very isolated in the early years, as the nearest town was 14 miles (23 km) away.

In 1960 the light was moved to a skeletal steel tower. The new light has a lamp with a 12-inch (300 mm) lens at a height of 78 feet (24 m). The old lighthouse was sold for $300 and moved three miles to a farm, where it was used first as a residence and then as a barn. In 1978 the house changed hands and was moved to Simmons Bayou, where it was restored and is now used as a private residence.
