= St. Joseph, Florida =

Ghost town in Florida, United States

Coordinates: 29.853°N 85.3324°W

St. Joseph was a boomtown founded in 1835 on the shores of St. Joseph Bay that briefly became the largest community in Florida before being abandoned after less than eight years. A yellow fever epidemic in 1841 ended its brief period of prosperity and the abandoned remnants of the town were destroyed by a storm surge in 1844. The town site is in Gulf County, Florida, near the city of Port St. Joe.

== Background ==
The creation of St. Joseph grew out of a land dispute in Apalachicola, Florida. Early in the 19th century John Forbes and Company, a Scottish-owned trading company authorized by the Spanish government of Florida to trade with Indians, had pressured Creeks and Seminoles to settle their debts with the company by transferring title to large tracts of land in Florida. The transfers were confirmed as grants by the Spanish government. The biggest block of land, amounting to 1,200,000 acres (490,000 ha) between the St. Marks and Apalachicola Rivers, became known as the Forbes Purchase, or Forbes Grant. The partners of John Forbes and Company sold most of the Forbes Purchase to what later became the Apalachicola Land Company before the transfer of Florida from Spain to the United States in 1821.

Establishment of the legitimacy of Spanish land grants in Florida made in the final years before the transfer of Florida required validation in United States courts. By the time that ownership of the Forbes Purchase by the Apalachicola Land Company had been confirmed in court in 1835, the town of Apalachicola had grown up on the west side of the mouth of the Apalachicola River. The land company offered to sell title to the occupied lots in town, but at prices that drove many residents to abandon their homes and move west to the shores of St. Joseph Bay.

== Growth and prosperity ==
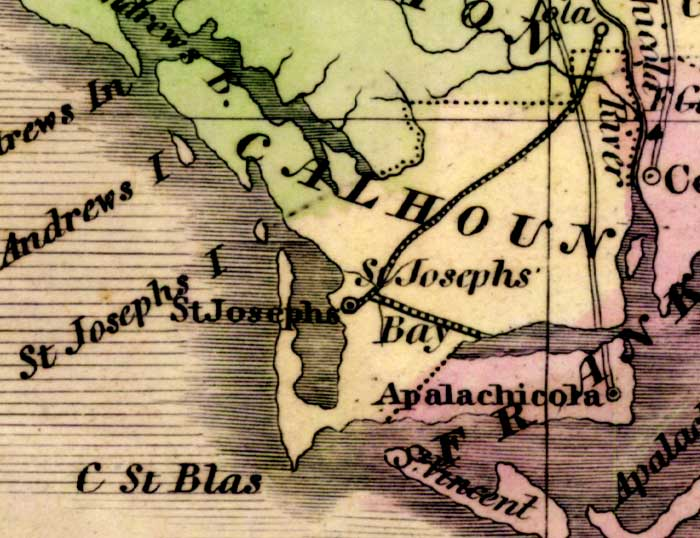
Map of Calhoun County, Florida in 1842 showing the county seat of St. Joseph, Apalachicola (in Franklin County), and the rail lines of the Lake Wimico and St. Joseph Railroad, running from St. Joseph to Lake Wimico (which is unlabeled) and from St. Joseph to the Apalachicola River at Iola

St. Joseph Bay is a natural harbor. Large ships had to anchor 16 miles (26 km) from Apalachicola, with cargo being transferred by barge between ships and the shore. On the other hand, St. Joseph Bay has no inflowing streams or rivers, and in 1835, had essentially nothing to ship out. The settlers of St. Joseph intended to divert cargo moving down the Apalachicola River, principally cotton and lumber, to the bay, bypassing Apalachicola. The Lake Wimico and St. Joseph Canal Company was chartered by the Legislative Council of the Territory of Florida in 1835 to dig a canal between St. Joseph and Lake Wimico, which was connected to the Apalachicola River by the Jackson River. Before excavation of the canal began, the company decided to connect Lake Wimico and St. Joseph with a railroad, and work was started on the roadbed. In 1836, the legislative council amended the company's charter (which become the Lake Wimico and St. Joseph Canal and Railroad Company) to allow it to build a railroad from any point on the Apalachicola River to St. Joseph. An 8 miles (13 km) long rail line from St. Joseph to Lake Wimico was completed in March, 1836, and the town became a shipping port.

By 1837 St. Joseph had become the most populous place in Florida, with a reported population between 4,000 and 12,000 inhabitants. (The 1840 federal census counted 125 heads of household and approximately 750 free whites in St. Joseph.) In 1838 the town hosted the first Constitutional Convention for Florida, which drew up a proposed constitution to be used when Florida became a state.

St. Joseph was originally in Franklin County. Calhoun County was created out of Franklin, Jackson and Washington counties in 1838, (Note: Calhoun County was later expanded by additions of territory taken from Jackson and Washington counties. Gulf County, in which the site of St. Joseph is now located, was created from Calhoun County in 1925.) with St. Joseph serving as the county seat until the collapse of the city.

St. Joseph had a mixed reputation. It was regarded as a "healthy and pleasant town", and many residents of Tallahassee resorted there in the summer. A delegate to the constitutional convention in 1838 wrote: "It was a striving busy place, its citizens full of energy and hope, fine buildings and hotels adorned the town and more were building." The same writer extolled the beauty of the bay. On the other hand, the presence of a gambling house, a horse racing track, bars, and the many sailors expected in a busy port, resulted in St. Joseph being called the "wickedest City in the Southeast."

In 1839 the St. Joseph Bay Light was built and placed in operation on St. Joseph Point, the northern end of the St. Joseph Peninsula, to mark the entrance to St. Joseph Bay. The light remained in service until 1847, when the lighthouse lantern and other equipment were moved to the new Cape San Blas lighthouse. The old St. Joseph Bay lighthouse washed away in 1851.

== Decline and abandonment ==
Storms in 1837 and 1839 drove ships ashore and destroyed buildings. In 1841 a ship brought yellow fever to St. Joseph. The disease killed many of the town's inhabitants, and caused most of the rest to flee. Robert R. Reid, fourth governor of the Territory of Florida, and other residents of Tallahassee, died that year of yellow fever that they reportedly contracted while in St. Joseph. Of an estimated 5,000 inhabitants in early 1841, only some 500 remained in St. Joseph after the epidemic ended. A hurricane, "The Late Gale at St. Joseph", hit the town on September 14, 1841, destroying the wharf, but with the collapse of trade, no ships were in port. A forest fire later that year burned part of the town. In 1843 residents of Apalachicola moved many abandoned houses to Apalachicola. While many houses were dismantled for transportation to Apalachicola, some were placed on barges and floated intact to that city, where a few still exist.

On May 1, 1844, the USS General Taylor called at St. Joseph, and found a town largely deserted, with only a few residents preparing to leave, and some workers dismantling houses. Later that year a hurricane struck St. Joseph on September 9 with a large storm surge, destroying whatever remained in the abandoned town. Some who had regarded St. Joseph as a "sin city" interpreted the storm surge as a manifestation of God's wrath.

The area remained sparsely inhabited for the rest of the 19th century. After a branch of the Apalachicola Northern Railroad reached St. Joseph Bay about 2 miles (3.2 km) north of the site of Old St. Joseph in 1910, a new city, Port St. Joe, grew up at the port.

== Present day ==
The only remains of St. Joseph are some tombstones in the Old St. Joseph, or 'Yellow Fever', Cemetery in present-day Port St. Joe – coincidentally located very close to the current office of the county health department.

The Constitution Convention Museum State Park nearby explains the role of St. Joseph in the early history of Florida government.

== See also ==
- Saint Joseph, namesake
