= Charlotte Harbor =

Charlotte Harbor may refer to:

- Charlotte Harbor, Florida, a census-designated place in Charlotte County, Florida, United States
- Charlotte Harbor (estuary), a large bay on the southwest coast of Florida
- Charlotte Harbor Light, a former lighthouse in Charlotte Harbor
- Charlotte Harbor Preserve State Park, a Florida State Park composed of islands and land that surround the Charlotte Harbor estuary
- Charlotte Harbor and Northern Railway, a former railroad in southwest Florida
  - Charlotte Harbor and Northern Railway Depot, a historic railroad depot in Boca Grande, Florida
