= Cape St. George Light =

Lighthouse in Florida, US

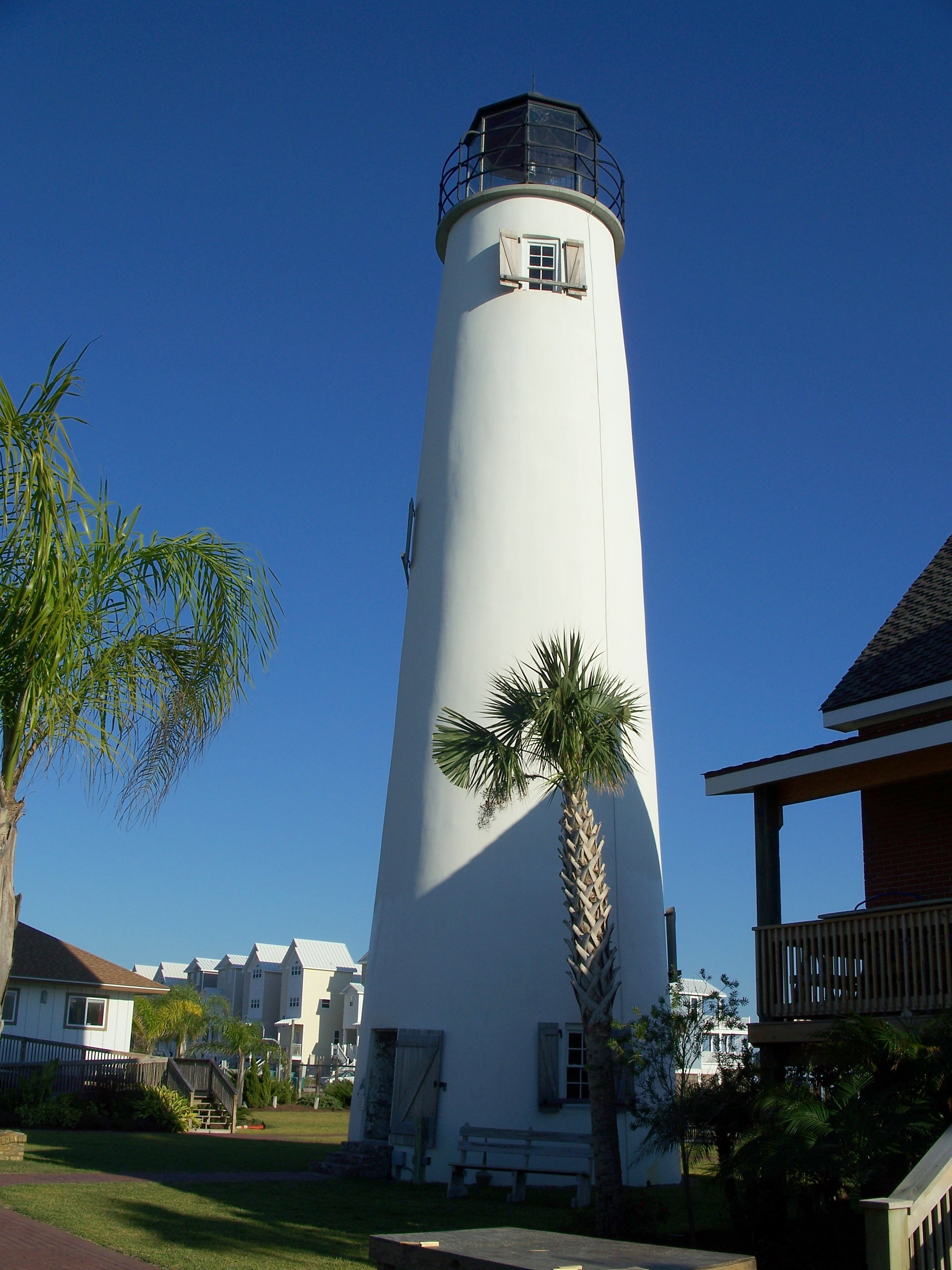
- Cape St. George Lighthouse (2010)
- Location: St. George Island; Florida; United States
- Coordinates: 29°35′15.2″N 85°02′49.32″W

Tower
- Constructed: 1833 (first); 1848 (second); 1852 (third)
- Foundation: stone basement
- Construction: brick tower
- Automated: 1949
- Height: 77 feet (23 m)
- Shape: tapered cylindrical tower with balcony and lantern
- Markings: white tower, black lantern
- Operator: St. George Lighthouse Association
- Heritage: National Register of Historic Places listed place

Light
- First lit: 2009 (rebuilt and relocated)
- Deactivated: 1994–2009
- Focal height: 77 feet (23 m)
- Lens: Third order Fresnel lens
- Characteristic: Fl W 6s
- Cape St. George Light
- U.S. National Register of Historic Places
- Location: S point of Little St. George Island, Little St. George Island, Florida
- Area: less than one acre
- Built: 1852
- NRHP reference No.: 74000625
- Added to NRHP: September 10, 1974

The Cape St. George Light is a 77-foot (23 m) high brick lighthouse which had originally stood for 153 years on St. George Island, Florida, until toppling into the Gulf of Mexico October 22, 2005. The pieces of the lighthouse were retrieved, and in April 2008, the light's restoration was completed.

== History ==
The first lighthouse on St. George Island was erected in 1833 near the island's western tip. It marked the narrow entrance to Apalachicola Bay at West Pass between St. George Island and St. Vincent Island. At the time, Apalachicola was an important cotton port. The tower was 65 feet (20 m) tall, and held 13 lamps with 15-inch (380 mm) reflectors (although the captain of a revenue cutter reported in 1834 that the tower was 75 feet (23 m) tall and had 11 lamps).

Due to the sharp convex bend of St. George Island's southern coast at Cape St. George, southeast of the light, ships approaching from the eastern Gulf could not easily see it. In 1847 Congress appropriated $8,000 for a new lighthouse on the cape, 2 miles (3.2 km) southeast of the original site. Materials from the old tower were used in the construction of the new tower in 1847–48. It was built on a foundation of bricks just 18 inches (460 mm) deep. A hurricane in the fall of 1850 undermined it, and the fourth hurricane of the 1851 Atlantic hurricane season toppled the tower in August of that year. The nearby lighthouses at Cape San Blas and Dog Island were destroyed by the same hurricane, and Apalachicola was heavily damaged.

The Cape St. George lighthouse was rebuilt in 1851–52, 250 yards (230 m) inland from its previous site; construction was hastened by the salvage and re-use of two thirds of the bricks of the ruined tower. This third lighthouse on St. George Island was erected on a foundation of pine pilings driven deep into the sand, with walls of hydraulic cement 4 feet (1.2 m) thick at the bottom and tapering to 2 feet (0.61 m) at the top. It was lit with a third-order Fresnel lens that was visible (given its elevation above sea level) to a shipboard observer up to 15 nautical miles (28 km; 17 mi) out to sea.

As with other lights that came under Confederate control during the Civil War, the lens and other components of the Cape St. George Light were protectively removed, first to Apalachicola, then further inland. Union naval forces captured Apalachicola in April 1862, but the light remained dark. The lens was found at the end of the war and reinstalled. The lens had been damaged, resulting in a "dark angle", and was replaced in 1899. A tropical storm damaged the tower and the other buildings in 1878.

The power source was converted to mineral oil in 1882, and to incandescent oil vapor in 1913. The light was automated in 1949. In 1994 the Coast Guard removed the light from the lantern room and decommissioned the lighthouse.

In 1995 Hurricane Opal washed away much of the sand around the tower, shifted it partially off its pilings and rotated it, leaving it leaning about 10° from vertical. In 1998 the tower was further damaged by Hurricane Georges. Supporters raised $50,000 locally and $160,000 from the state to correct the tilt. The tower was righted and a new foundation built under it in 2002. However, the base was still exposed to surf, and the new foundation began deteriorating. The tower collapsed on October 21, 2005.

== Reconstruction ==
Island volunteers formed the St. George Light Association to reconstruct the lighthouse on a more protected site. A salvage company retrieved 24,000 of the structure's 160,000 bricks from the water, and volunteers cleaned them. The Association won grants of $525,000 from federal and state sources, and rebuilt the lighthouse in a county park in the middle of St. George Island. 29.663060°N 84.862702°W Local contractors provided construction services at reduced rates. The salvaged bricks were used in the interior lining of the conical tower. In April 2008, the restored lantern room was placed on top. The completed reconstruction was opened to the public on November 29.

== Head keepers ==
- John W. Smith (1834)
- Allen Smith (1834–1835)
- John Garrison (1835)
- Willis Nichols (1835–1841)
- Saunders J. Nichols (1841)
- Samuel Parker (1841–1842)
- David Adkins (1842–1846)
- William McKeon (1846–1848)
- Francis Lee (1848–1849)
- William H. Taylor (1849–1850)
- William Austin (1850–1854)
- Braddock Williams (1854–1861)
- James Reilly (1866–1867)
- Joseph Lucroft (1867–1868)
- Braddock Williams (1868–1874)
- Arad L. Williams (1874–1875)
- James A. Williams (1875–1893)
- Edward G. Porter (1893–1913)
- John F. Reese (1913–1917)
- David D. Silva (1917–1921)
- Walter A. Roberts, Jr. (1921)
- Clairmon Brooks (1921–1925)
- David D. Silva (1925–1932)
- Walter Andrew Roberts, Jr. (1932–1938)
- Thorton K. Cooper (1938–1939)
- Sullivan R. White (1939–1946)

== Gallery ==
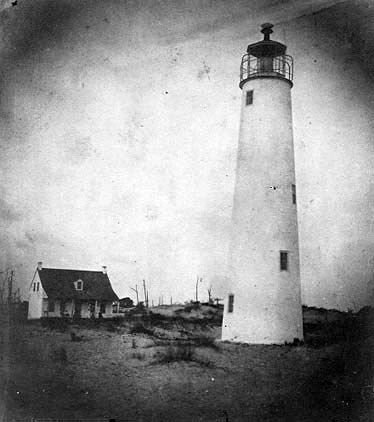
First (1833) lighthouse on St. George Island, between West Pass and Cape St. George (U.S. Coast Guard Archive)

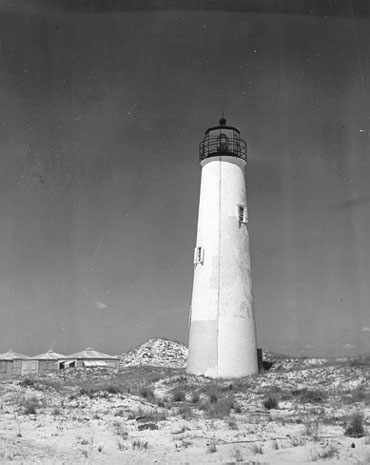
The Cape St. George Lighthouse (from US Coast Guard archives)

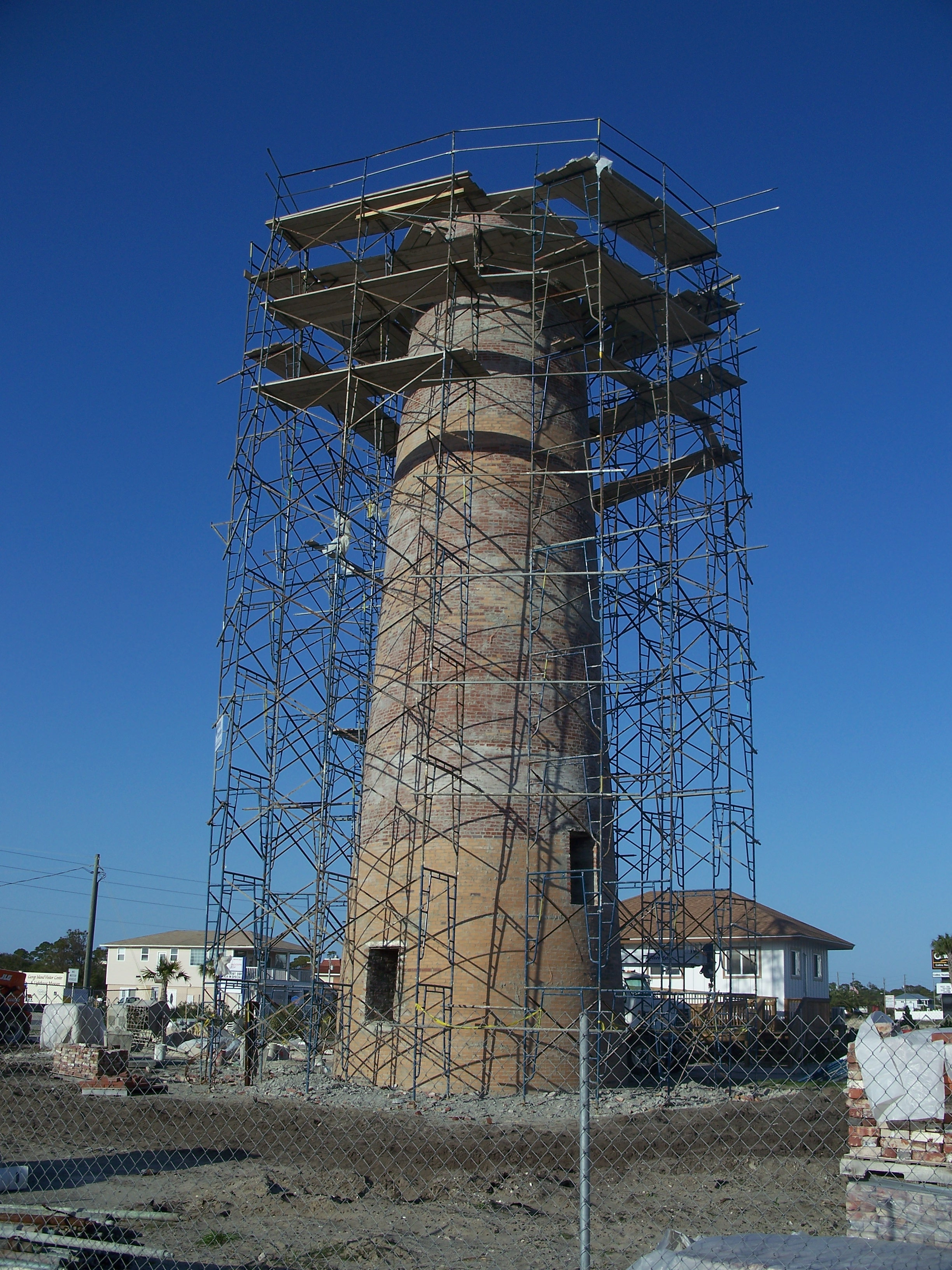
The reconstructed lighthouse, nearing completion

== See also ==
- List of lighthouses in Florida
- List of lighthouses in the United States
