= Dames Point Light =

Lighthouse in Florida, US

- Location: on the shoals off Dames Point; St. Johns River; Florida; United States
- Coordinates: 30°23′00″N 81°33′16″W

Tower
- Foundation: wooden piles with cast-iron sleeves
- Construction: wooden tower
- Shape: square tower atop keeper's house
- Markings: white building, red piles

Light
- First lit: 1857 (lightship); 1872 (lighthouse)
- Deactivated: 1893
- Focal height: 35 feet (11 m)
- Lens: Fifth-Order Fresnel lens
- Range: 9.6 nautical miles; 18 kilometres (11 mi)
- Characteristic: F W

The Dames Point Light marked an 8-foot-deep (2.4 m) shoal at a sharp bend in the St. Johns River in Florida that was a danger to ships heading to or from Jacksonville.

== History ==
In 1857 a small lightship was placed at the Dames Point shoal. The lightship was also equipped with a foghorn and bell. During the Civil War, the lightship was towed to Jacksonville, and all equipment was stored on shore. The ship did not survive the war, and the shoal remained unmarked until 1872.

On March 3, 1871 Congress appropriated $20,000 "for erecting an iron screw-pile lighthouse on the shoals off Dames Point, St. John's River in the State of Florida". During the winter of 1871-1872 the structure was framed at the workshop at Lazaretto Point, Maryland and the iron work prepared under contract. In March, 1872, a working party was dispatched to erect the structure which was completed in June, 1872.

The lighthouse stood on a shoal in 8 feet of water, being built on six wood piles, with cast iron sleeves, and had two fender-piles, one up and the other down stream. The fixed white light was first exhibited on July 15, 1872. In 1891 it was reported that the structure had been struck several times by lightning, and an additional lightning conductor of copper was provided in that year, to run from the lantern sill to one of the iron piles and thence below the lowest water line.

In 1893 the establishment of numerous post lights in the St. Johns River above and below the Dames Point Lighthouse made the continuance of the light unnecessary and it was discontinued February 28, 1893. The lantern and lens were taken down and transferred to Charleston, South Carolina and the lantern parapet was roofed in with shingles. The remaining lighthouse structure was destroyed by fire on December 25, 1913.

The Dames Point Light was located close to the present-day north bridge pier of the Dames Point Bridge that crosses the St. Johns River.

== See also ==
- List of lighthouses in Florida
- List of lighthouses in the United States
