= Kissimmee Lakefront Park =

Park in Kissimmee, Florida, United States

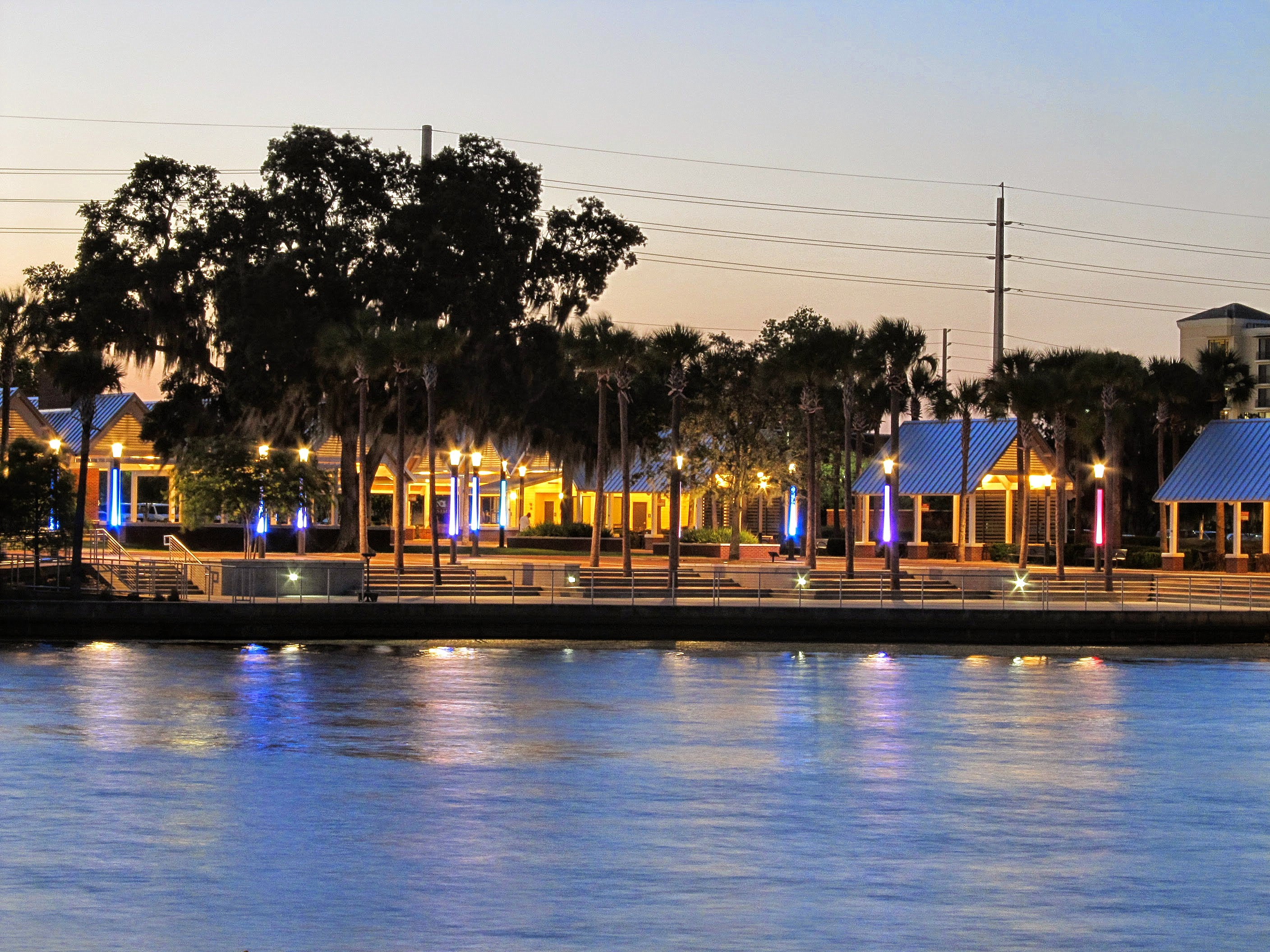
- Kissimmee Lakefront in the evening
- Interactive map of Kissimmee Lakefront Park
- Type: City park
- Location: Osceola County, Florida
- Coordinates: 28°17′19.0″N 81°24′19.1″W
- Area: 25 acres (10 ha)
- Operator: City of Kissimmee
- Status: Open all year
- Website: Kissimmee Lakefront Park

Kissimmee Lakefront Park is a 25-acre (10 ha) park located in Kissimmee, Florida, on the city's waterfront. The park is located near the city's historic downtown, on the northwestern shore of Lake Tohopekaliga. The lake is located along the course of the Kissimmee River, forming the northern wetlands of the Everglades.

The park itself includes a 1.1 mile nature trail that runs along the perimeter of the lake. Additionally, the park features outdoor event spaces, pavilions, playgrounds, and splash pads at the park's center, and piers for boating and freshwater fishing.

== History ==
After much urging from the Kissimmee Beautification League, in 1919 the city council of Kissimmee unanimously approved a bulkheading ordinance to beautify the lakefront. Before, the lake area was relatively low and flat lying, comprised with wild gallberry bushes and palmettos. This required dredging of these natural landforms. The park eventually opened in circa 1926, with its proper waterfront, trails, and even a zoo, becoming a "crown jewel" for the city.

=== Kissimmee Zoo ===
Coinciding with the city's plans for a beautified waterfront, was also the desire in offering visitors and community members a zoo. The lakefront, together with the Kissimmee Zoo, became a highlight of the community, featured in postcards and other promotional material for the growing town.

Animals first arrived to the zoo in 1926. By 1933, a census that was conducted recorded: "123 animals, 52 birds, and 21 reptiles". The zoo continued to expand and receive more animals, making the zoo a popular spot for tourists and for school trips.

However, by the late 1960s the zoo began to fall into disarray. Ultimately, in 1970, the city council decided to shut down the zoo. Though a tragic loss, the waterfront continued to remain a central a fixture for the community.

=== Kissimmee Lighthouse ===
Despite the loss of the Kissimmee Zoo, the lakefront park continued to be a highlight for the community. However, by the turn of the Millennium, the city was still in need for a secondary attraction, to fill the gap that the zoo once offered to visitors. In July 1999, the city opened the Kissimmee Lighthouse to the public. The lighthouse helped in contributing to the overall maritime aesthetic to the city's waterfront, but it was also quite functional. It assisted recreational boaters in returning safely to shore.

=== Modern renovations ===
By the early 2000s, the park was in need for major renovations. In 2006, the city commissioned West Palm Beach based developer Burkhardt Construction, to head the construction for an entirely new waterfront and an expansion of the park. Construction for this complete reimagining for the lakefront commenced in 2007, which was constructed at different stages. Stages I and II, which included covered picnic areas, playgrounds, a stage, a new boat ramp, and new bricked walkways, finished construction in 2013. While the very last stage, III, of construction, which included a splash pad, more playgrounds, and an entirely new boardwalk and retrofitted marina along the lake, finished in 2015. The newest section of the park officially opened on January 31, 2015.

== Park information ==
The park is located near the historic downtown of Kissimmee. Thus, while the park features a nature trail around the perimeter of the lake, picnic tables, playgrounds, splash pads, outdoor venue fields, pavilions (available for rent for private events), and a marina with fishing piers, there are additional landmarks nearby. These include the Monument of States (which is listed on the U.S. National Register of Historic Places), the Kissimmee Lighthouse, the small Grissom Park, a Veterans Memorial, and the Bataan-Corregidor Memorial (which honors the sacrifice made by American and Filipino soldiers who fought and survived together through the Bataan Death March during World War II).

== Gallery ==
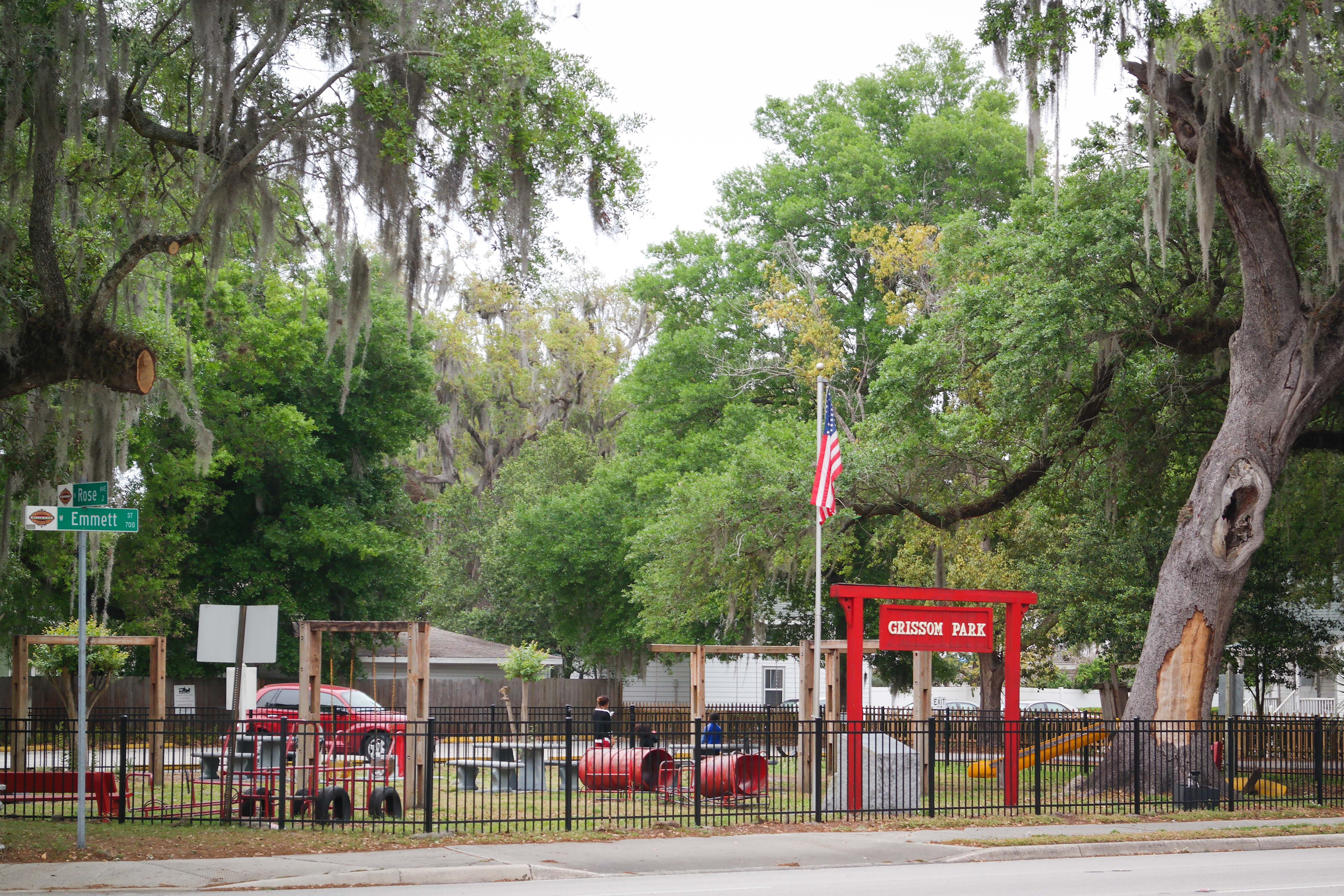
Grissom Park

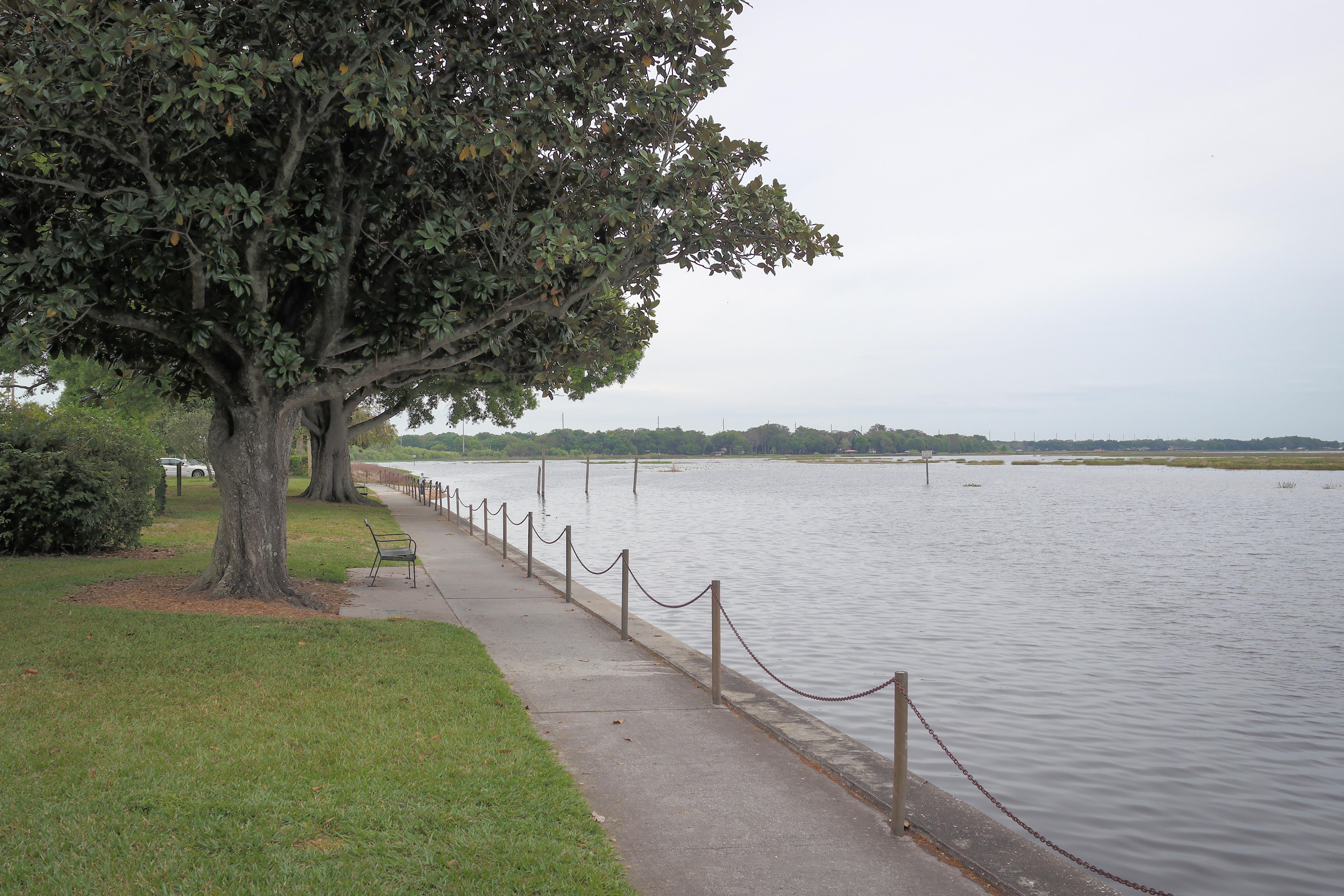
Boardwalk

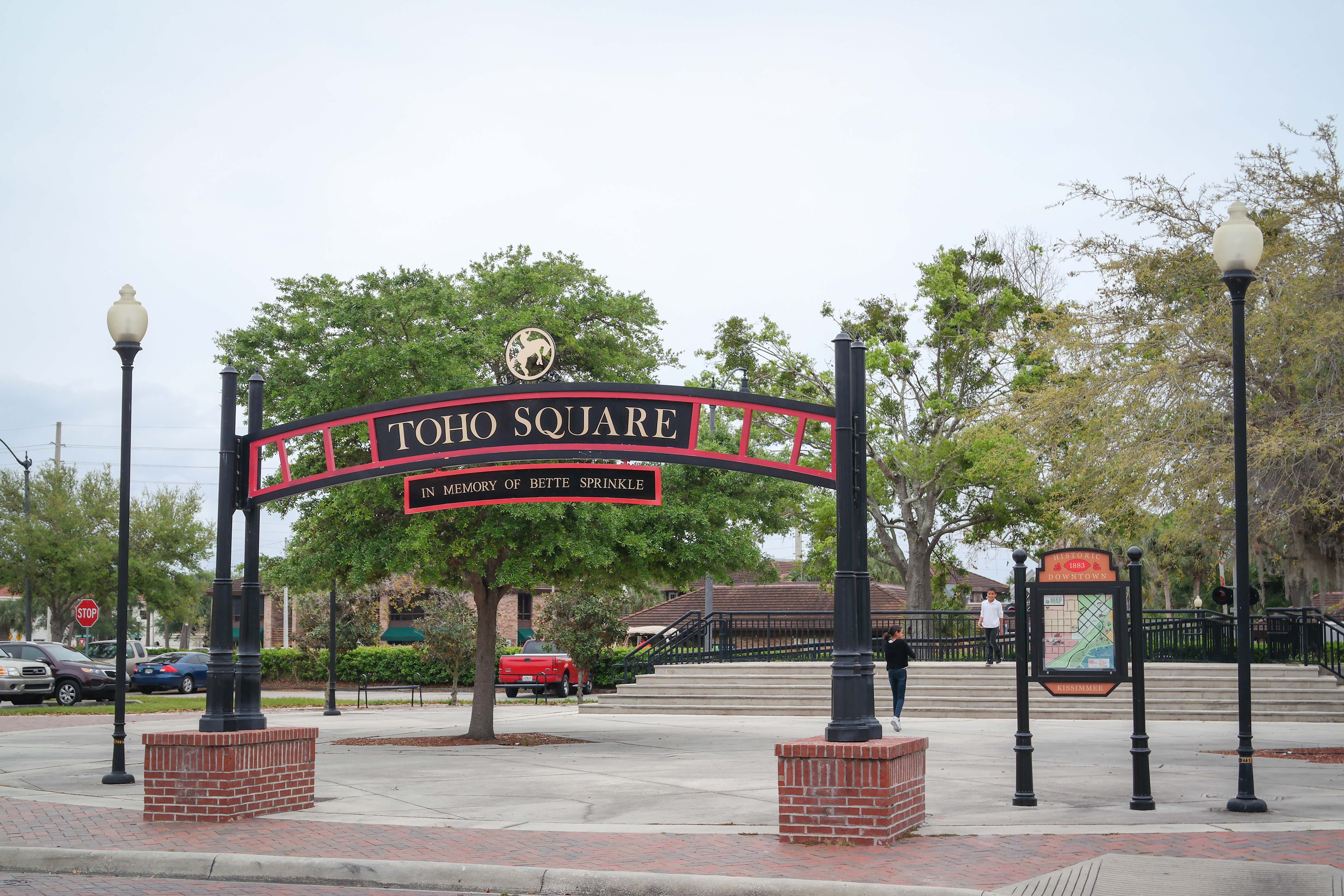
Toho Square

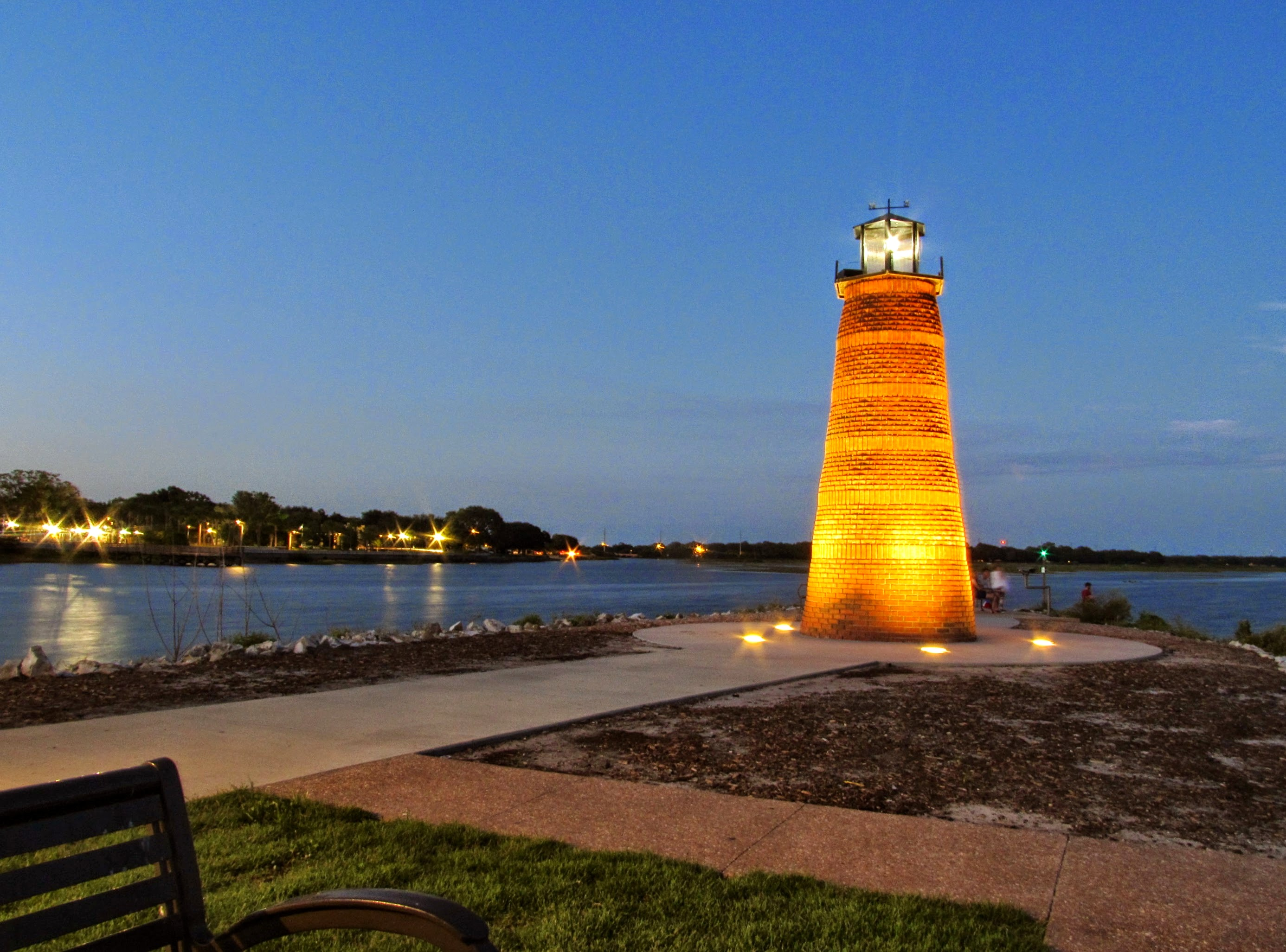
Lighthouse
