= Amelia Island Light =

Lighthouse in Florida, United States

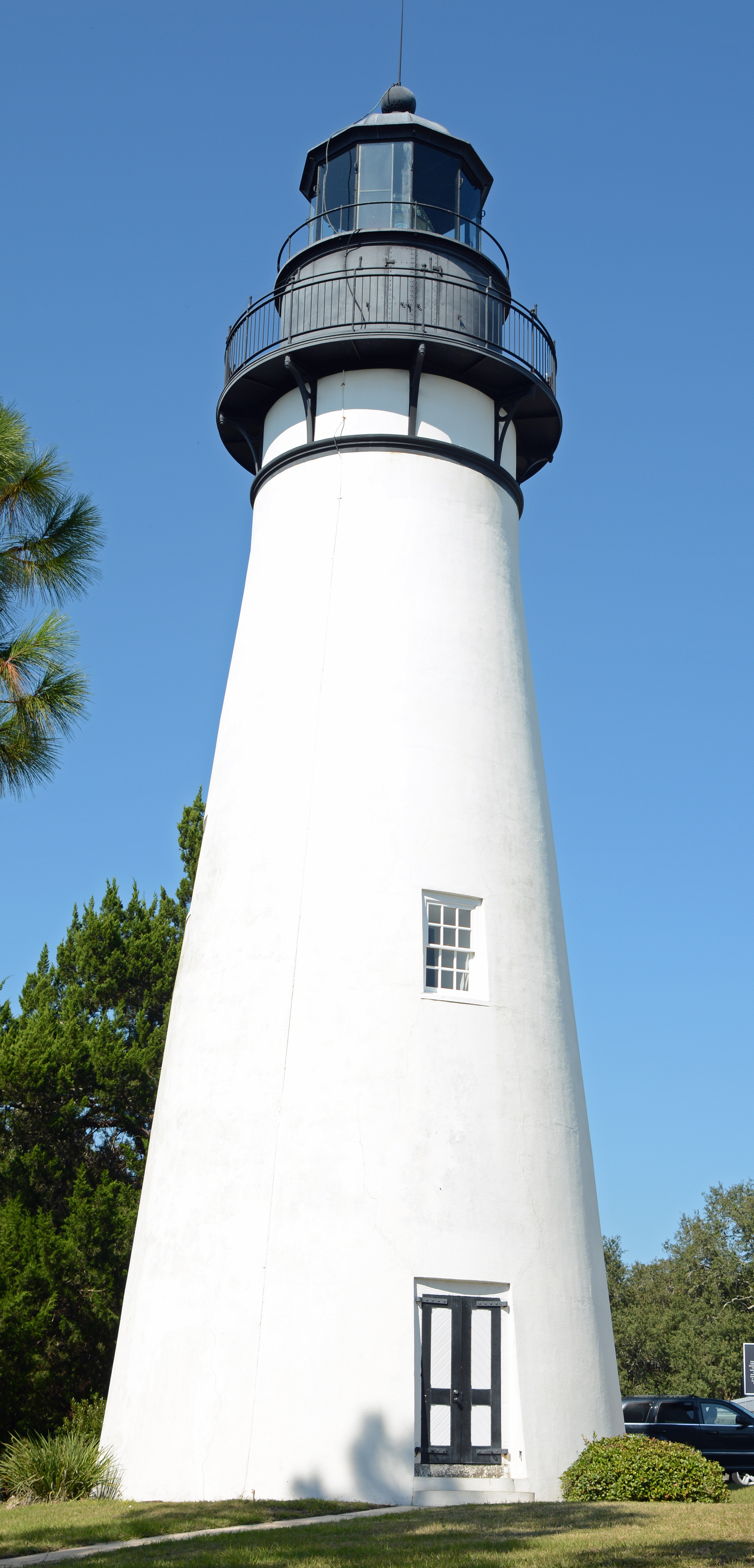
- Location: northern end of Amelia Island marking the St. Marys Entrance; Fernandina Beach; Florida; United States
- Coordinates: 30°40′23.43″N 81°26′32.94″W

Tower
- Constructed: 1838-1839
- Foundation: stone basement
- Construction: brick with stucco tower
- Automated: 1970
- Height: 64 feet (20 m)
- Shape: tapered cylindrical tower with balcony and lantern
- Markings: white tower, black lantern
- Operator: City of Fernandina Beach
- Heritage: National Register of Historic Places listed place

Light
- Focal height: 107 feet (33 m)
- Lens: 14 lamps with 14-inch (360 mm) reflectors in a revolving lens (1839); 3rd order Fresnel lens (1903)
- Range: white: 23 nautical miles (43 km; 26 mi) red: 19 nautical miles (35 km; 22 mi)
- Characteristic: Fl W 10s. red from 344° to 360°, covers shoal water in vicinity of Nassau Sound.
- Amelia Island Lighthouse
- U.S. National Register of Historic Places
- Location: 215 1/2 Lighthouse Circle, Fernandina Beach, Florida
- Area: 2.4 acres (0.97 ha)
- Architect: Lewis, Winslow
- MPS: Florida's Historic Lighthouses MPS
- NRHP reference No.: 03000004
- Added to NRHP: February 13, 2003

The Amelia Island Light is the oldest existing lighthouse in the state of Florida in the United States. It is located near the northern end of Amelia Island in the northeastern part of the state. Its light marks St. Marys Entrance, the inlet leading to St. Marys River, the Cumberland Sound and the harbor of Fernandina Beach, Florida along the Amelia River. The white light flashes every ten seconds which turns red from 344° to 360° when covering the shoal water in the vicinity of Nassau Sound.

The lighthouse is listed as number 565 in the United States Coast Guard (USCG) light list.

== History ==
The lighthouse was built in 1838 using materials taken from the former lighthouse (the predecessor of Little Cumberland Island Light) on the southern tip of Cumberland Island in Georgia just north of the inlet, which had been built in 1820. The brick tower was originally 50 feet (15 m) tall placed on a hill. In 1881, a lantern was installed on the tower increasing the tower height to 64 feet (20 m) with the focal plane height of 107 feet (33 m) above sea level.

The tower for the light formerly on Cumberland Island was taken down and rebuilt on Amelia Island in 1838. The new light was originally equipped with 14 lamps each with a 14-inch (360 mm) reflector when first lit in 1839. The reflector size was increased to 15 inches (380 mm) by 1848. This arrangement was replaced by a third-order Barbier Benard Fresnel lens in 1903, which is still used in the lighthouse.

The Amelia Island Light was automated in 1970. The next-to-last civilian keeper of the lighthouse was Thomas J. O'Hagan, who was the son of the previous keeper, Thomas P. O'Hagan, and was married to a direct descendant of the first keeper, Amos Latham.

The light remains in operation, but the lighthouse structure is now a private residence.

== Management ==
The ownership of the lighthouse was transferred from the United States Coast Guard to the City of Fernandina Beach in 2001, which now maintains the historical monument. The Coast Guard, though, is still responsible for the function of the beacon. Access to the lighthouse is limited by the city. As of 2015, the lighthouse is not open to the public, except on Saturdays when the grounds are open for viewing for three hours only. The city also offers tours to the lighthouse twice a month.

== Head keepers ==
- Robert Church (1820–1829)
- Amos Latham (1829–1842)
- Capt. Edmund Richardson (1842–1848)
- George W. Walton (1848–1854)
- Horace D. Vaughan (1854–1857)
- James W. Woodland (1857–1859)
- Christopher C. Morse (1859)
- George Latham (1859 – )
- James H. Parker (1864–1868)
- Joseph H. Donnelly (1868–1873)
- Henry Swan (1873–1874)
- Henry Gage (1874–1878)
- Samuel Petty (1878–1879)
- Joseph S. Howell (1879–1880)
- Dewayne W. Suydam (1880–1891)
- Charles W. Grimm (1891–1905)
- Thomas Patrick O’Hagan (1905–1925)
- Thomas John O’Hagan (1925–1954)
- David Martin (1954–1958)
- Otho O. Brown (1958–1962)
- Louis J. Oglesby, Jr. (1962–1966)
- Otho O. Brown (1966–1970)

== Gallery ==
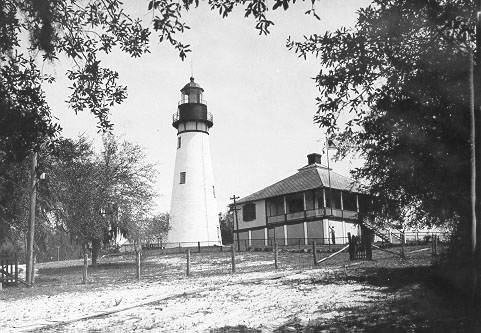
Photo from the U.S. Coast Guard archives

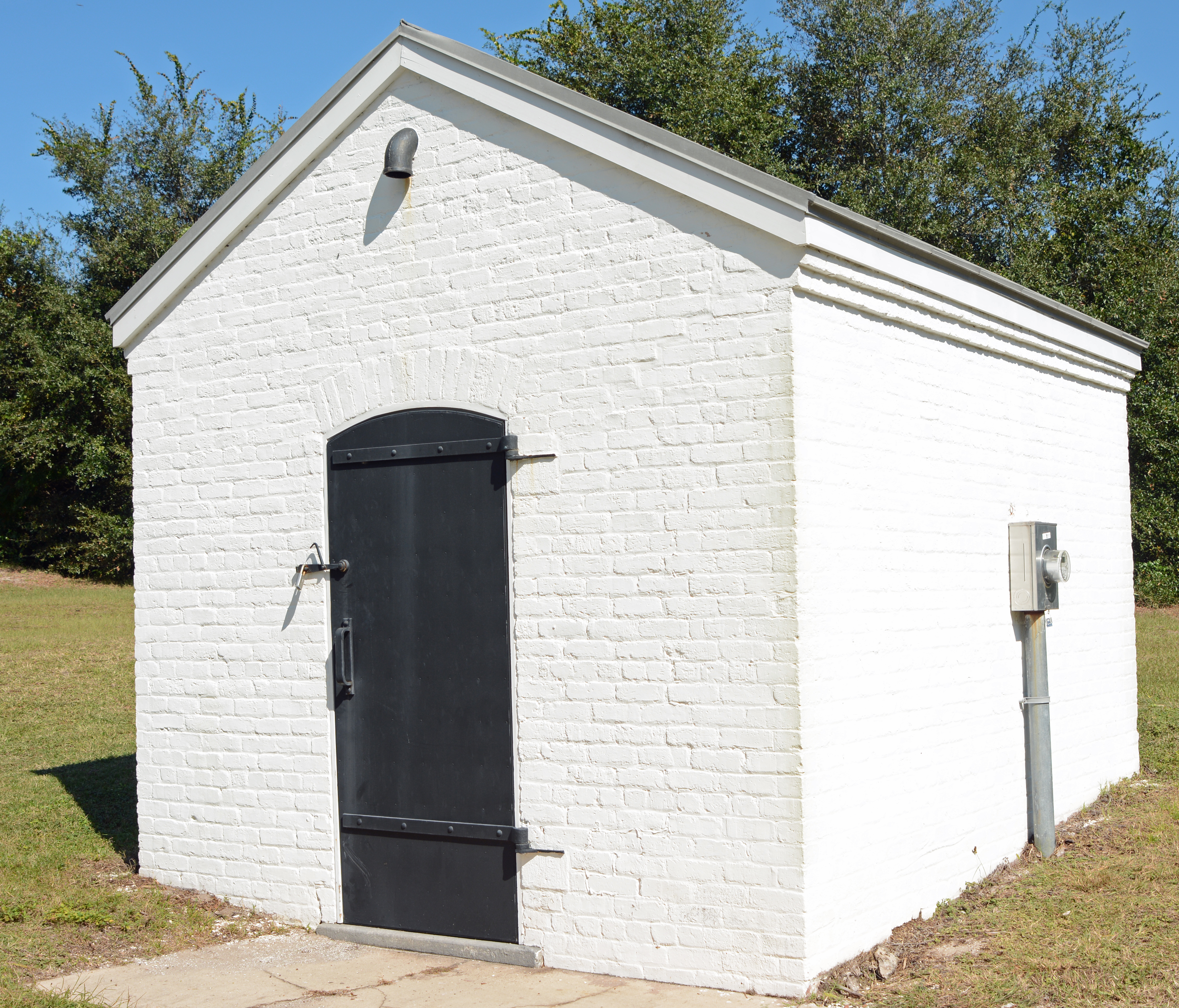
Oil building

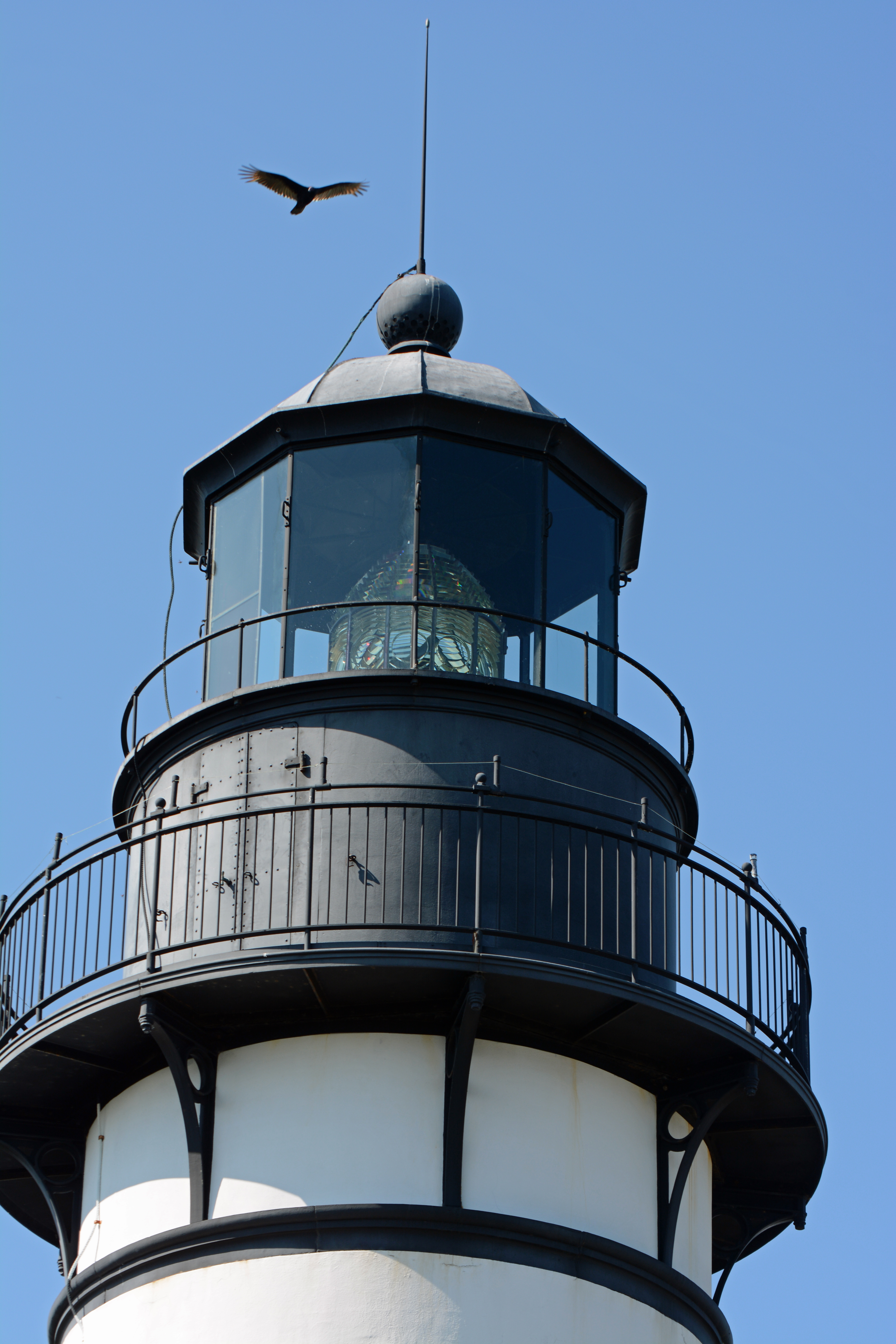

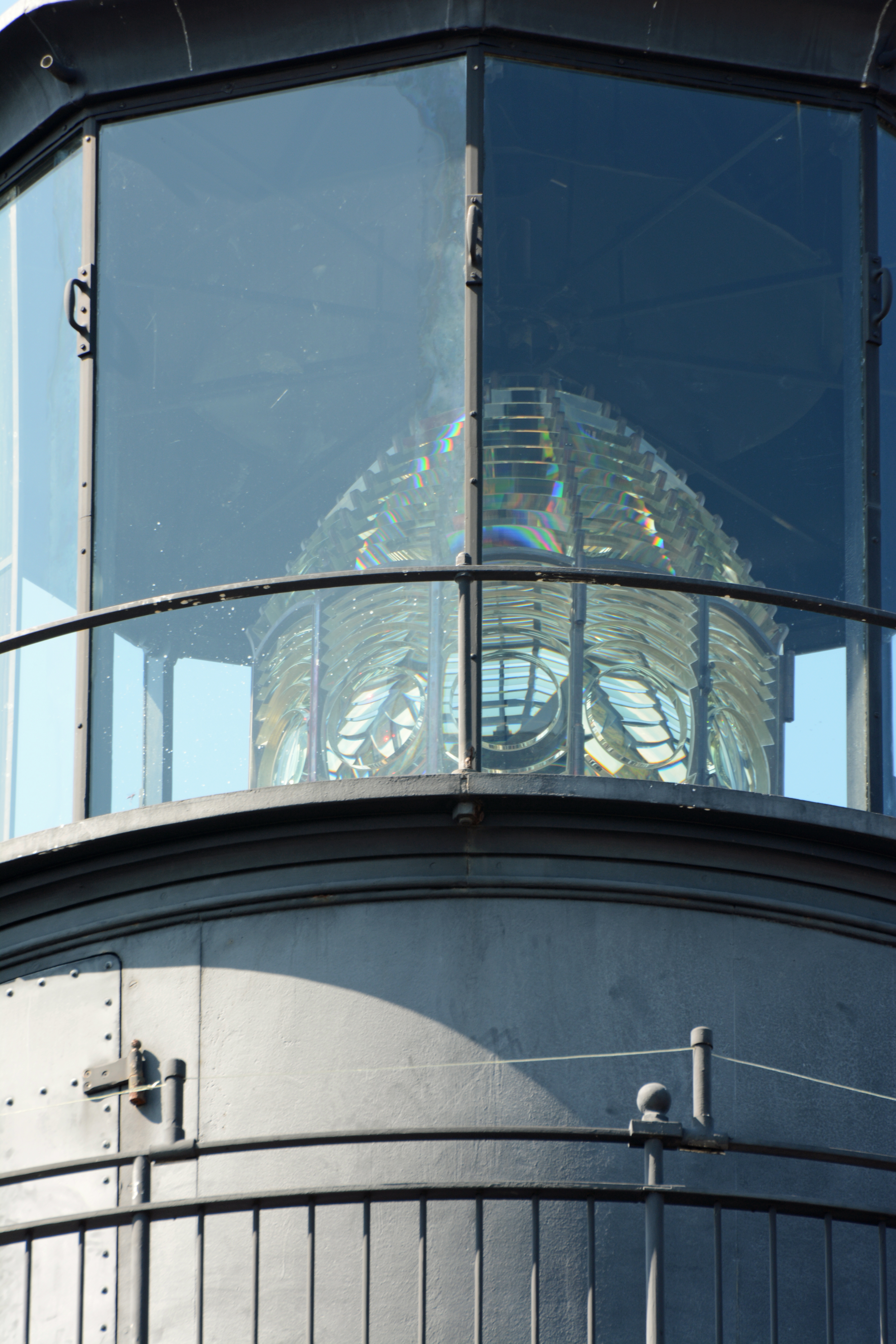
Lens

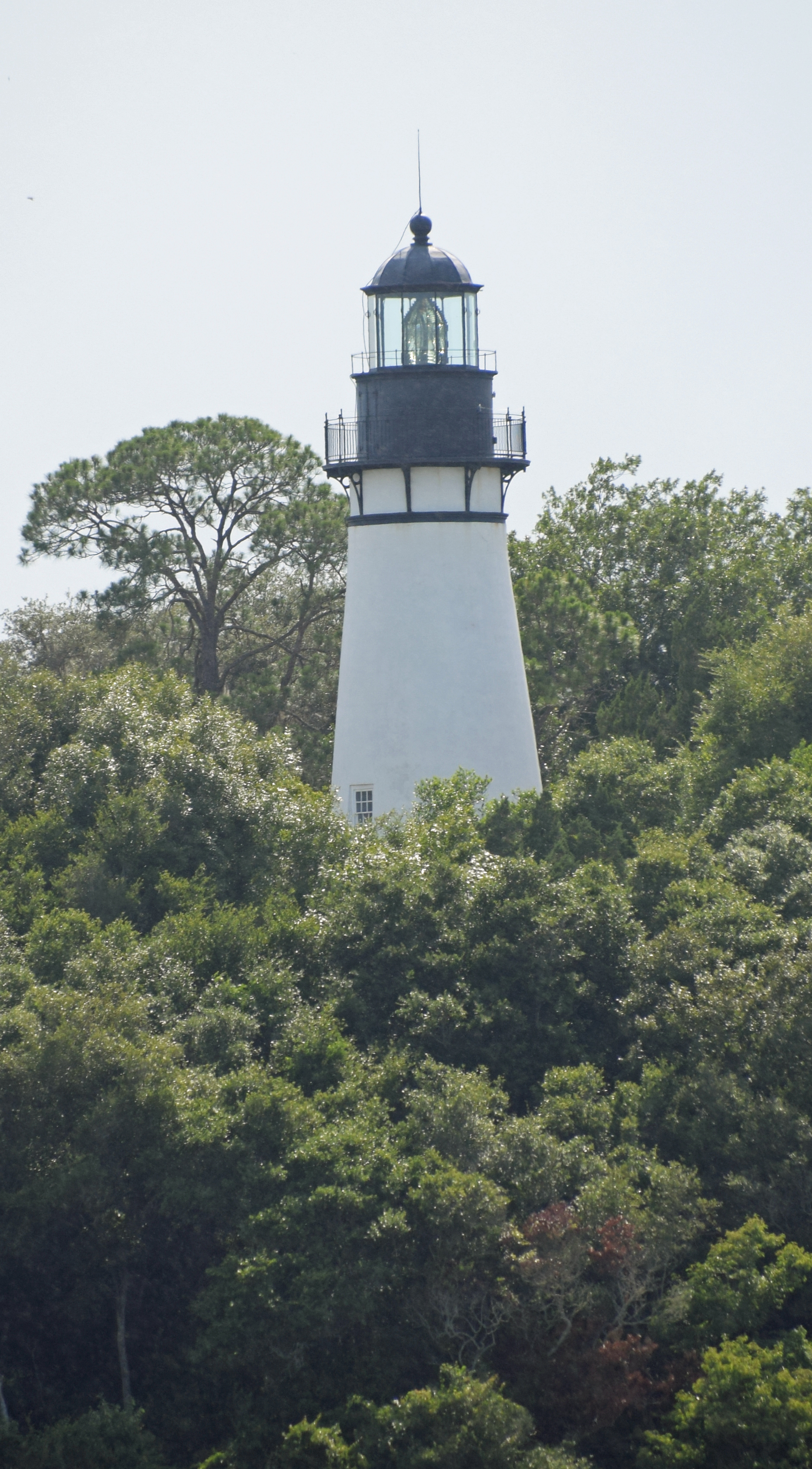
From a distance

== See also ==
- List of lighthouses in Florida
- List of lighthouses in the United States
