= Amelia Island North Range Light =

Lighthouse in Florida, United States

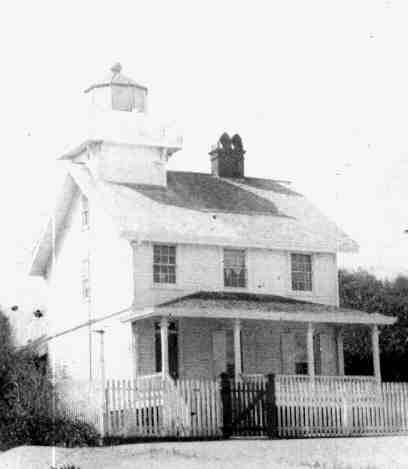
- The 1872 Amelia Island North Range Lighthouse
- Location: mouth of the St. Mary's River; Florida; United States
- Coordinates: 30°42′12″N 81°26′18″W

Tower
- Constructed: 1858
- Construction: wood
- Shape: square tower atop keeper's house
- Markings: white tower and lantern

Light
- First lit: 1872 (rebuilt)
- Deactivated: 1899
- Lens: Sixth order Fresnel lens
- Characteristic: F R

The Amelia Island North Range Light was built to mark a channel over the sandbar at the mouth of the St. Mary's River, which led to the harbor at Fernandina Beach, Florida, on Amelia Island. It consisted of a lighthouse and a front range tower with a light, arranged so that when ships could see one light above the other, they were lined up with the channel. During the Civil War Confederate forces removed the lenses from the lights. Union forces seized Fernandina Beach, Fort Clinch and the lighthouse in 1862.

It is known that the front range tower was destroyed during the war. There is no record of when the lighthouse was destroyed, but a new lighthouse was built in 1872. As the channel over the sand bar shifted with time, the front range light was periodically moved to maintain an alignment with the channel. In 1887 the rear range light was moved from the lighthouse to a tramway to permit proper adjustments to be made to the alignment. The light was decommissioned in 1899 after the channel was sufficiently marked with buoys. The lighthouse was listed in a survey in 1924, but has since disappeared.

== See also ==
- List of lighthouses in Florida
- List of lighthouses in the United States
