= Kissimmee (Lake Tohopekaliga) Lighthouse =

Lighthouse in Florida, US

Kissimmee Lighthouse
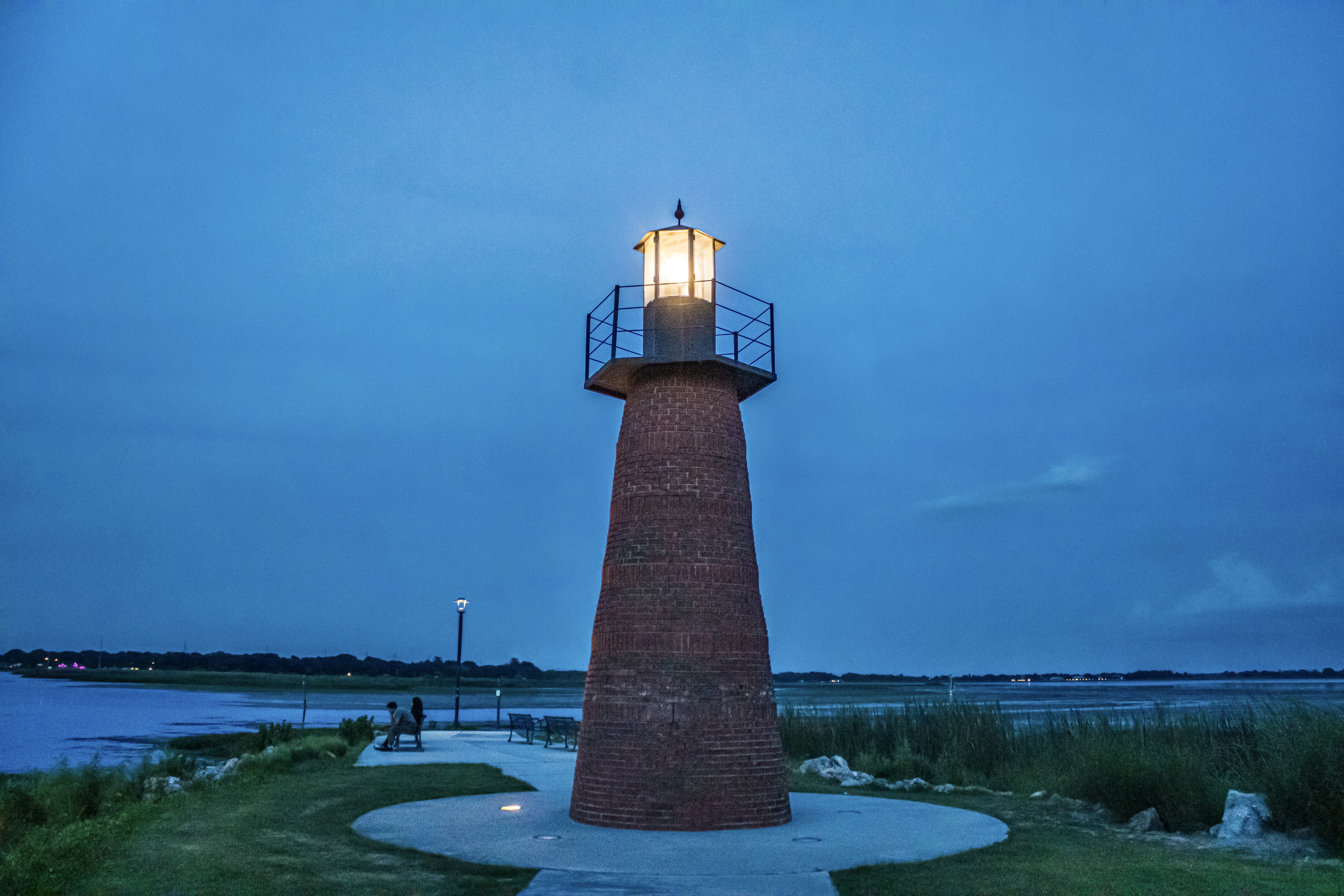
- Kissimmee Lighthouse (2026)
- Location: Kissimmee; Florida; United States
- Coordinates: 28°17′19.0″N 81°24′19.1″W

Tower
- Constructed: 1999 (first)
- Construction: brick tower
- Height: 22 feet (6.7 m)
- Shape: cylindrical tower topped with a lantern
- Markings: red brick tower, black lantern
- Operator: City of Kissimmee Parks & Recreation Department

Light
- Focal height: 22 feet (6.7 m)

The Lake Tohopekaliga Light, more commonly known as the Kissimmee Lighthouse, is a 22-foot (6.7 m) red brick lighthouse, located in Kissimmee, Florida, United States. Situated on a pier at Kissimmee Lakefront Park in the Kissimmee Historic District, the lighthouse is located along the northwestern shore of Lake Tohopekaliga. The lighthouse is currently active, as it assists pleasure craft approaching the marina from the lake.

== History ==
During most of the 20th century, Kissimmee Lakefront Park had been described as a "crown jewel" of the city. However, a breakwater that was composed of chunks of concrete and other materials, had long been a blight on the waterfront's overall beauty. The city decided to convert the breakwater into a landscaped trail with a lighthouse at the end. The lighthouse was opened to the public in July 1999. The lighthouse still stands today, not only as an aesthetic backdrop to the waterfront, but serving as a vital light for recreational boaters on Lake Tohopekaliga (part of the Kissimmee Watershed).

== Gallery ==
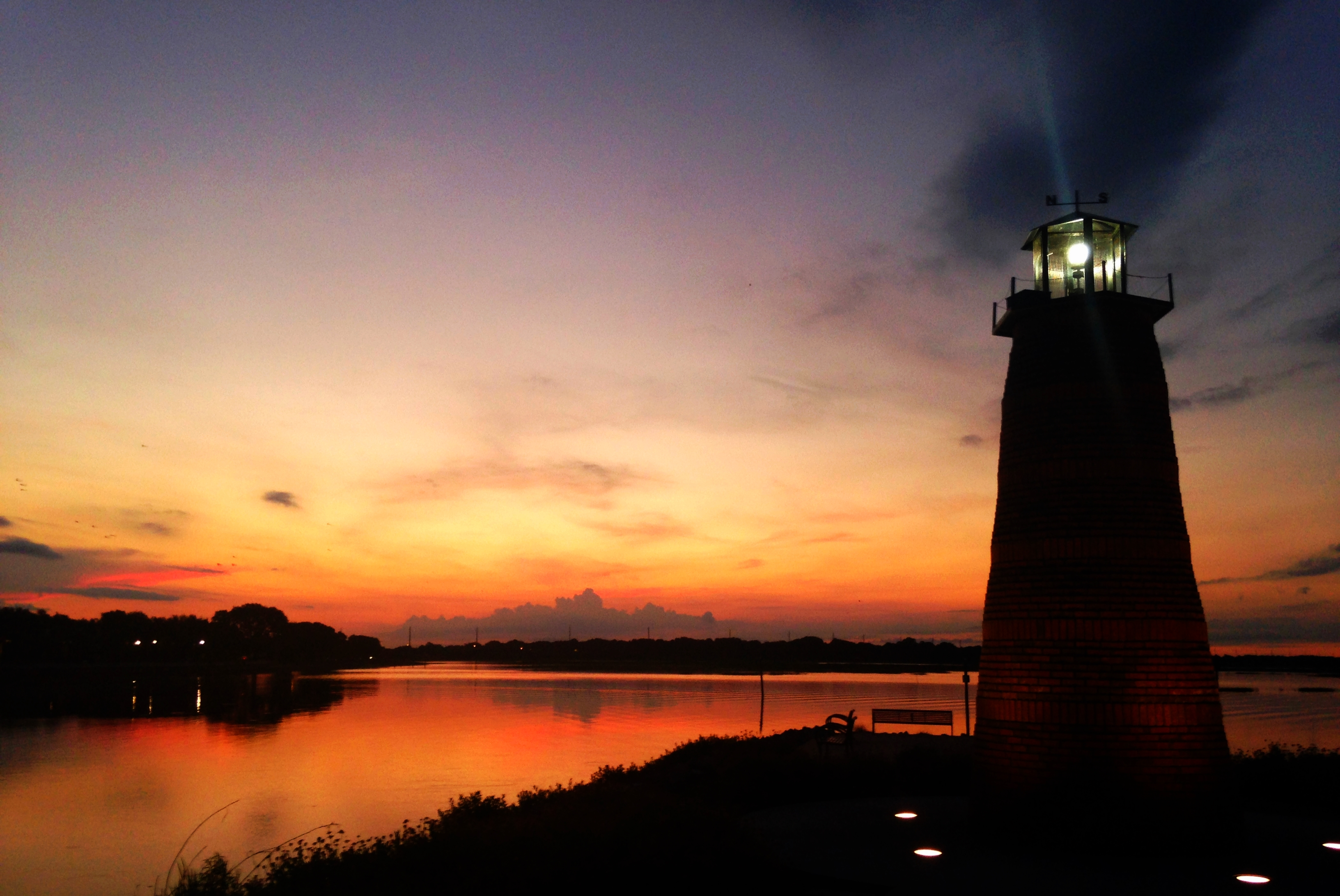
The Lighthouse at dawn

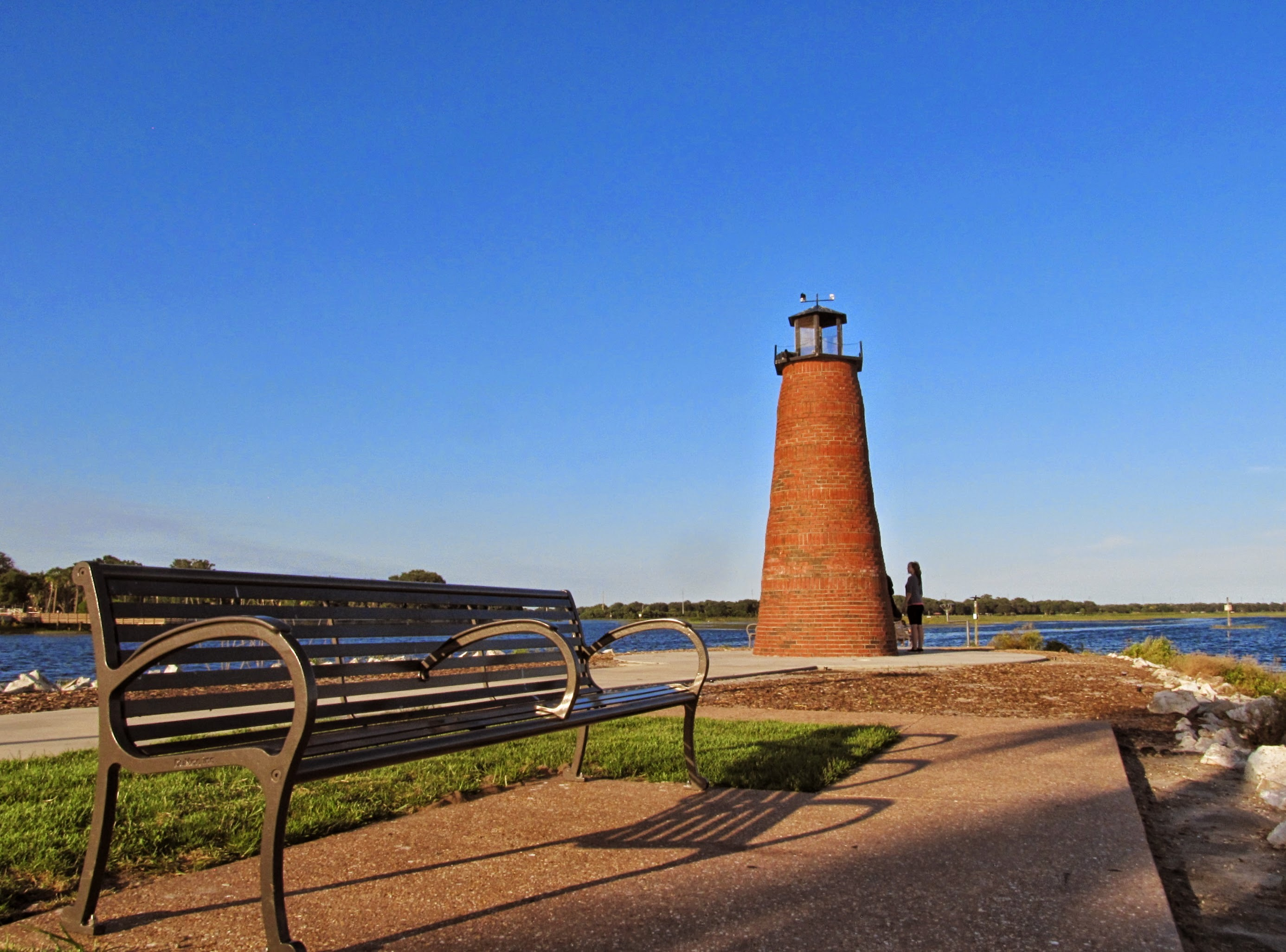
The Lighthouse on a clear day

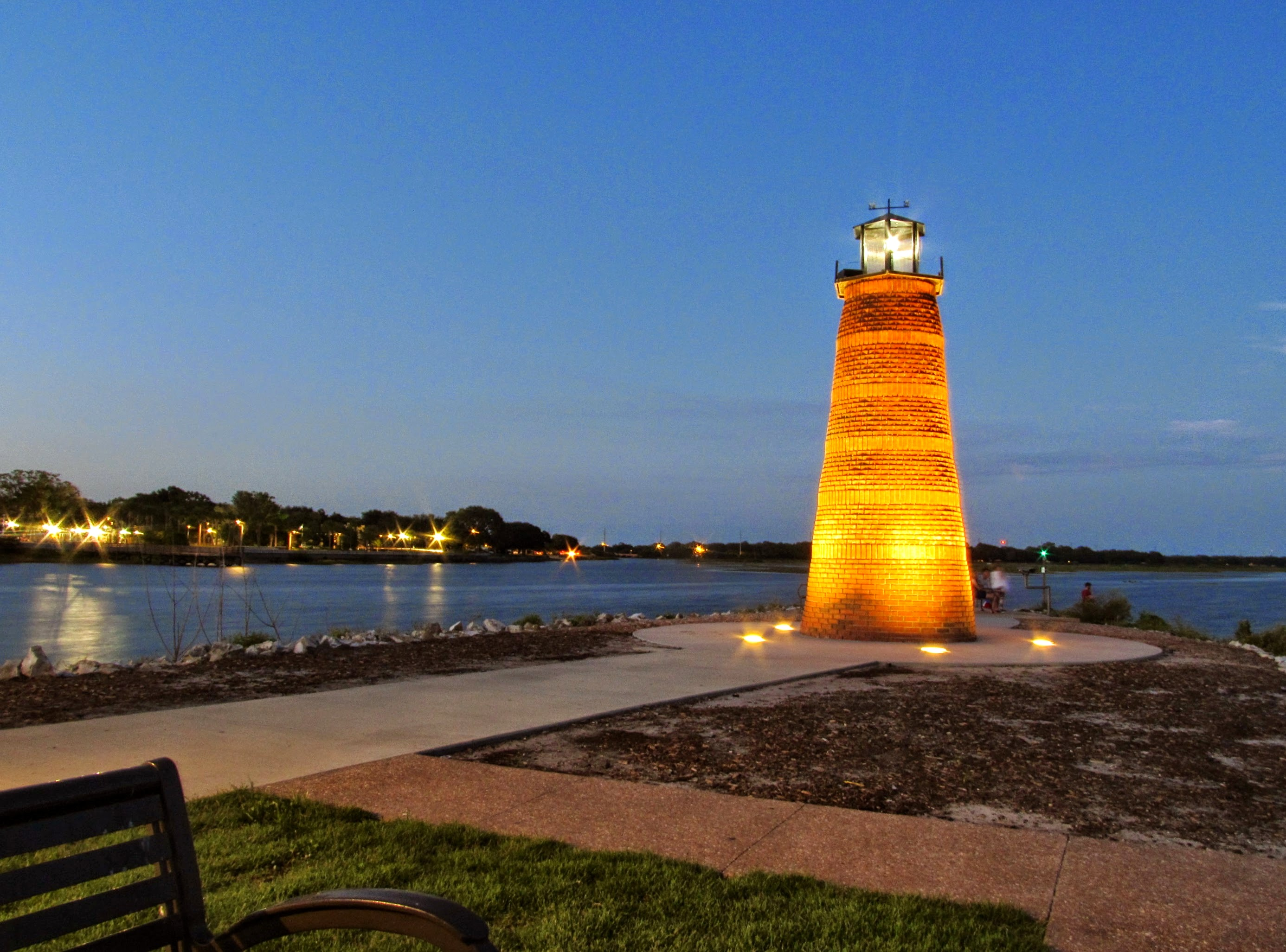
The Lighthouse at dusk

== See also ==
- List of lighthouses in Florida
- List of lighthouses in the United States
