= Cape San Blas =

Cape on the panhandle of Florida, US

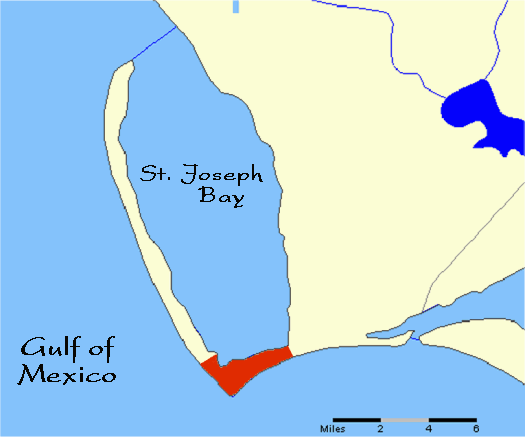
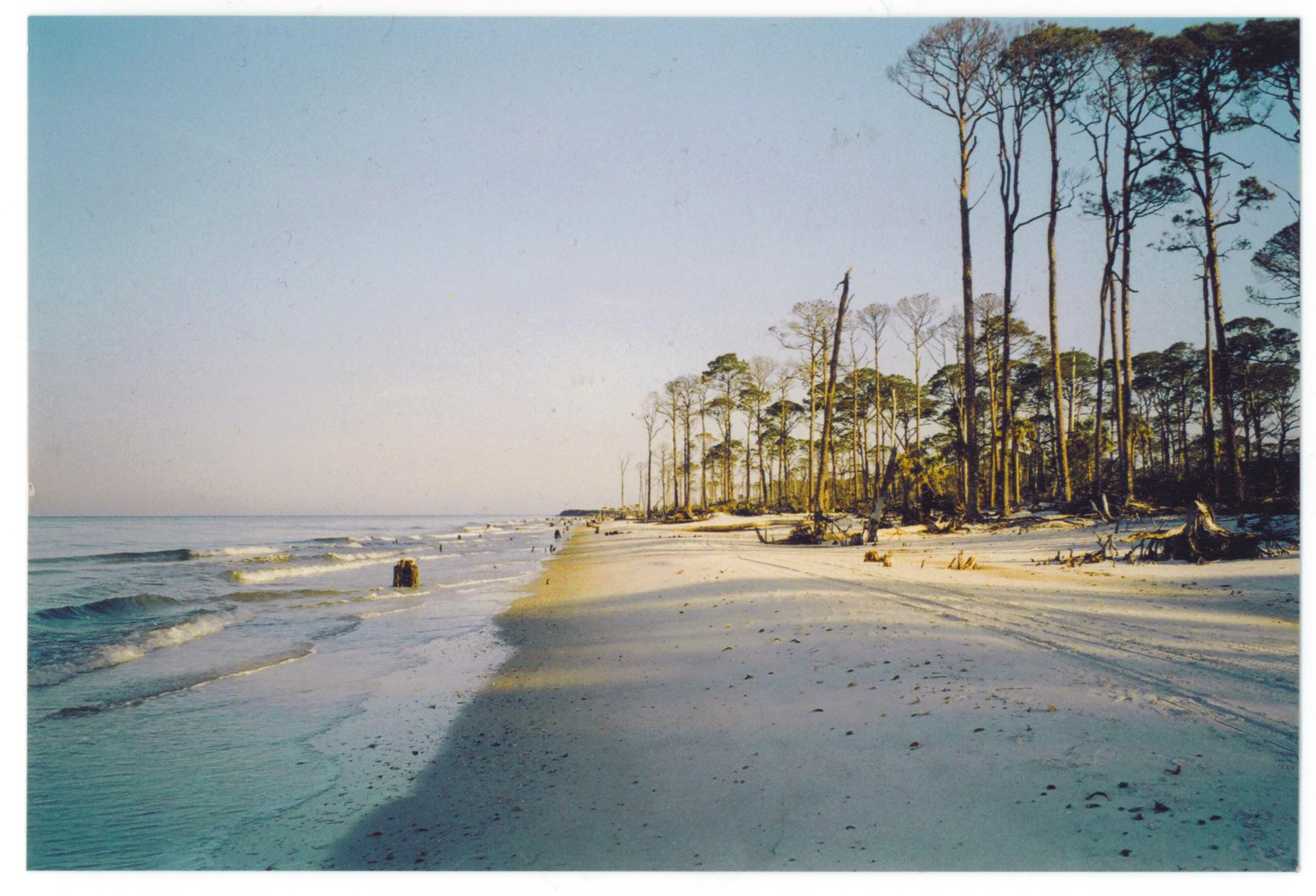
Cape San Blas, Florida location (top) – Hurricane Katrina left most of Cape San Blas's beaches severely damaged. The south point has experienced the most extreme erosion where the lighthouses have been historically located. Note in the background, the fortified main road can be seen running out into the water

Cape San Blas is part of a peninsula in Gulf County, Florida, extending westward from the mainland of Florida, separating St. Joseph Bay to the north from the Gulf of Mexico to the south. It is fifty-nine miles southeast of Panama City. The St. Joseph Peninsula extends northward from the west end of Cape San Blas. It is approximately 10 miles (16 km) south-southwest of the town of Port St. Joe, located at coordinates 29°39′49″N 85°21′20″W.

== History ==
Cape San Blas was home to a Confederate saltworks where 150 US bushels (5.3 m^{3}) of salt a day were processed by evaporation of seawater. This halted in 1862, when a landing party from the Union ship, the USS Kingfisher, destroyed the saltworks.

Cape San Blas has had four lighthouses. The first, built in 1847, collapsed during a gale on August 23–24 of 1851. Congress appropriated $12,000 for a second brick tower lighthouse for the cape which was finally finished in November 1855, but it was destroyed on August 30, 1856, when another hurricane struck Cape San Blas. On May 1, 1858, a third lighthouse was completed. During the Civil War the lighthouse was not in commission but resumed operations July 23, 1865. Over the years, erosion began eating away at the lighthouse. In 1883 the fourth iron frame lighthouse was constructed.

In the aftermath of Hurricane Michael, large swaths of the vacation rentals on the peninsula were heavily damaged. A new inlet was cut where the road was washed out inside St. Joseph Peninsula State Park; other portions of the road, especially at its southern end near the Cape itself, were heavily damaged.

== See also ==
- Cape San Blas Light
