= Volusia Bar Light =

Lighthouse in Florida, US

- The Volusia Bar Light in 1915, the year before it was deactivated.
- Location: The inlet of the St. Johns River into Lake George, Florida
- Coordinates: 29°12′24″N 81°34′46″W

Tower
- Constructed: 1886
- Foundation: screw piles
- Construction: wood building
- Shape: Square tower and lantern on roof of 1½ story wooden dwelling

Light
- First lit: 1886
- Deactivated: 1916
- Lens: 1886, fourth-order Fresnel lens; 1899, fifth-order Fresnel lens

The Volusia Bar Light was a river lighthouse marking the inlet of the St. Johns River into the south end of Lake George, Florida.

== History ==
The light was removed in 1916, but a foghorn remained active until 1943. The building was burned by vandals in 1974. The foundation pilings still show above the water.

The keeper, A. J. Anderson, was murdered in 1938. Mariners noticed that the light was unattended. His body was found floating face-down in the river after he had been missing for more than a week. An autopsy established that his neck had been broken. The lighthouse had been ransacked, and Anderson had apparently struggled with his attacker. The murder has never been solved.
