= Northwest Passage Light =

Lighthouse in Florida, US

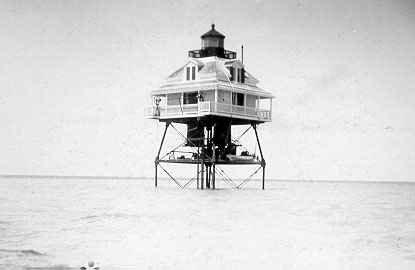
- Light station marking the northwest passage to Key West in 1892
- Location: Westerly side of the northerly end of the northwest channel to Key West harbor
- Coordinates: 24°37′08″N 81°53′57″W

Tower
- Foundation: Iron pilings
- Construction: Wood
- Automated: 1911
- Height: 47 feet (14 m)
- Shape: Square high-peaked house on pilings

Light
- First lit: 1855, rebuilt in 1879
- Deactivated: Before 1971
- Lens: Fifth order Fresnel lens

The Northwest Passage Light was a lighthouse located eight miles (13 km) from Key West, Florida, at the entrance to the northwest channel to the Key West harbor. The first light was a lightship put on station in 1838. The lightship broke its moorings but survived the Great Havana Hurricane of 1846, which destroyed the Sand Key and Key West lighthouses. The United States Lighthouse Board requested funds to replace the lightship in 1852, citing the expense of maintaining it. The lightship was repaired and funding for a replacement lighthouse was delayed until 1854. The new lighthouse was completed in 1855.

The original fifth order Fresnel lens was replaced with a fourth order lens after the Civil War. In 1879 the deteriorating wooden structure was replaced with a new structure based on the original iron pilings. The light was automated with acetylene gas in 1911. The light was deactivated some time between then and 1971, when the wooden structure burned. The iron pilings remain, but are deteriorating. It is known locally as the "Hemingway house on the water", or "Hemingway Stilts", based on a legend that Ernest Hemingway used to own or, at least, fish from the structure.
