= T.H. Stone Memorial St. Joseph Peninsula State Park =

State park in Florida, United States

- IUCN category IV (habitat/species management area)
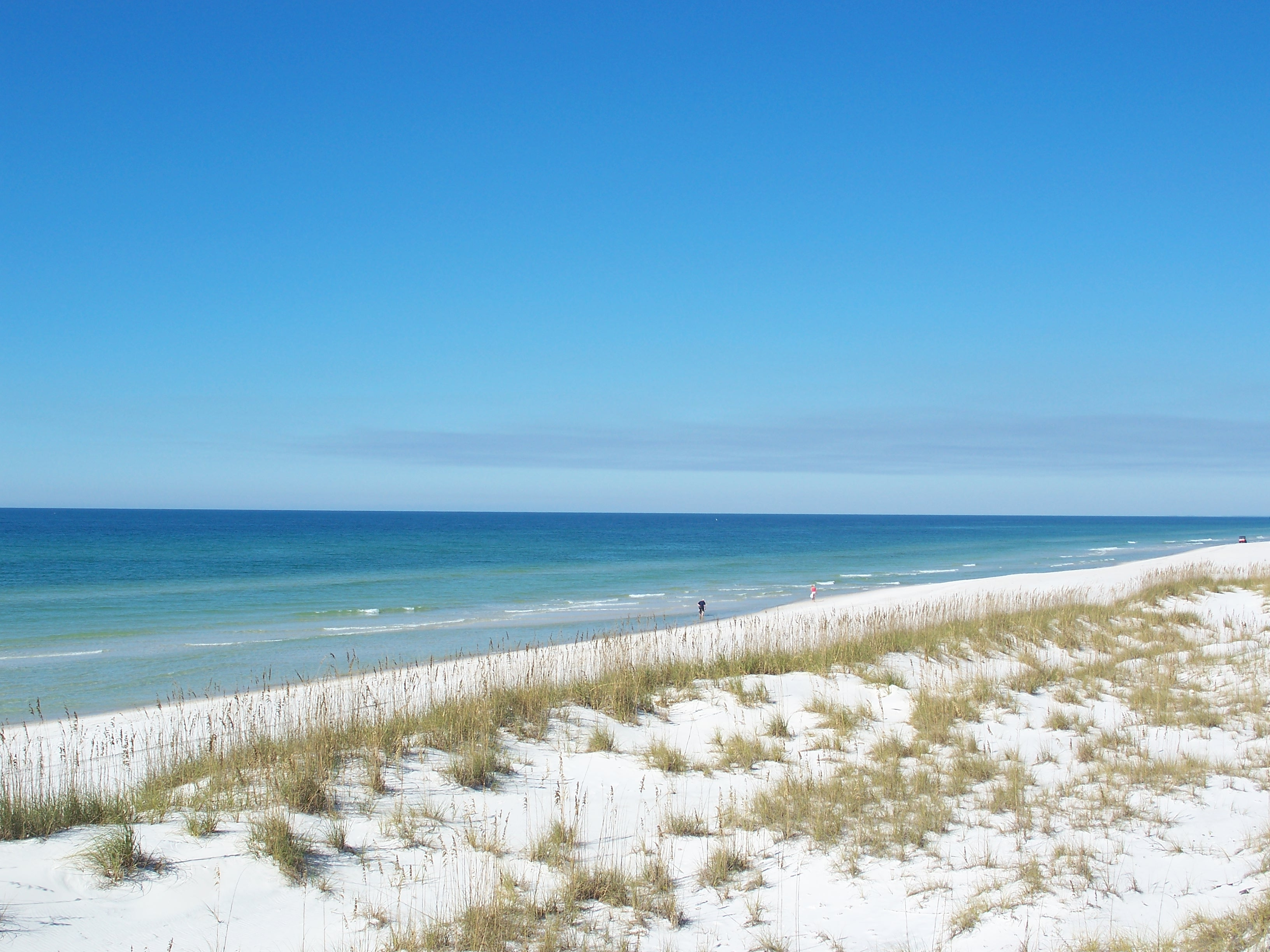

- Location within Florida Location within the United States
- Interactive map of T.H. Stone Memorial St. Joseph Peninsula State Park
- Location: Gulf County, Florida, USA
- Nearest city: Port St. Joe, Florida
- Coordinates: 29°45′19″N 85°23′44″W
- Area: 1,750 acres (7.1 km^{2})
- Established: 1967
- Governing body: Florida Department of Environmental Protection

T.H. Stone Memorial St. Joseph Peninsula State Park is a Florida State Park on the St. Joseph Peninsula near Port St. Joe. It is located off U.S. 98.

== Wildlife ==
Least terns and snowy plovers nest on the park's beaches. Loggerhead and green sea turtles also nest there between May and October, while St. Andrews beach mice burrow among the dunes.

== Recreational activities ==
The park has such amenities as beaches, picnicking areas, cabins, and full camping facilities. It also has a visitor center.

There are miles of sugar-white sand; the park's beach has often been ranked among the best in the United States by Dr. Beach. Sunbathing, snorkeling, and swimming are popular warm-weather activities.

Canoeists and kayakers can view the high dunes and sand pine scrub. Outdoor enthusiasts can enjoy fishing, hiking, or bicycling. St. Joseph Park provides opportunities for bird watching; over 240 species have been sighted there.

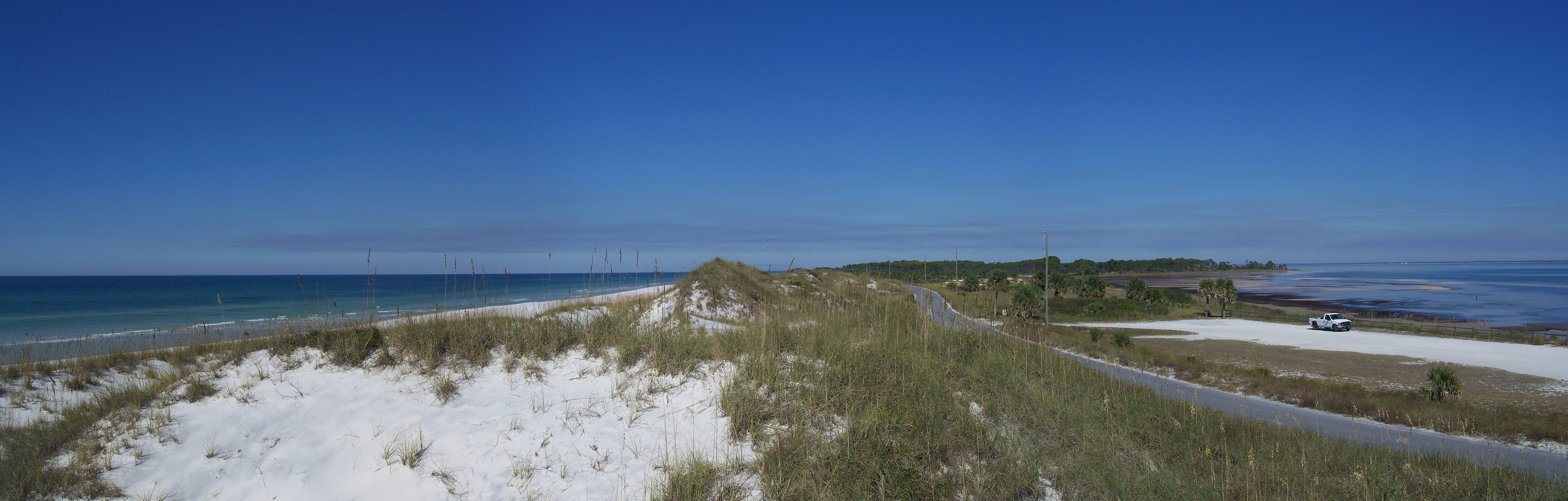
Looking north. St. Joseph Bay on the right, Gulf of Mexico on the left

== See also ==
- St. Joseph Bay
- St. Joseph Peninsula
