= St. Joseph Peninsula =

Geographical feature in Florida, US

St. Joseph Peninsula, Florida.

The St. Joseph Peninsula is located in Gulf County, Florida, in the Florida Panhandle, at coordinates 29°42′55″N 85°23′05″W. It is a 15-mile long spit, extending northward from Cape San Blas between the Gulf of Mexico to the west and St. Joseph Bay to the east. It is 6 miles west of Port St. Joe at its closest point. The peninsula is also known as St. Joseph Spit. The northern two-thirds of the peninsula is known as St. Joseph Point.

== History ==
Evidence of the occupation of the St. Joseph Peninsula by Native Americans includes the Old Cedar site, the Eagle Harbor site and the Harrier site, occupied by people of Weeden Island culture. The Old Cedar and Eagle Harbor site also have artifacts from the Fort Walton culture, and the Eagle Harbor site has artifacts from the Swift Creek culture.

The Spanish named the bay Bahía de San José early in the 16th century, but did not occupy or exploit the area through the 17th century. In 1701 they built a fortification, the Presidio Bahía de San José de Valladeres, on the mainland opposite St. Joseph Point, with a lookout post on the point, but left two years later. In 1718, during the War of the Quadruple Alliance, the French invaded St. Joseph Bay and established Fort Crevecouer on the shores of St. Joseph Bay opposite St. Joseph Point. The Spanish in turn sent 800 men to retake St. Joseph Bay. After pushing the French out of the area in 1719, the Presidio Bahía de San José de Nueva Asturias was established on St. Joseph Point. With the loss of Pensacola to France that year, the new presidio was designated the capital of the newly created Province of the Principality of Nueva Asturias. The presidio, with about 2,000 inhabitants, lasted until 1722, when the post was moved to Presidio Isla Santa Rosa Punta de Siguenza near Pensacola on Santa Rosa Island.

The St. Joseph Bay Light was established on St. Joseph Point in 1838 to serve the new town of St. Joseph on the eastern shore of the bay. The light was discontinued in 1847, after the town had been abandoned, and the unused tower was destroyed in a storm in 1851.

== Park ==
T.H. Stone Memorial St. Joseph Peninsula State Park occupies somewhat more than half of the northern part of the peninsula. The peninsula was cut through by Hurricane Michael October 10, 2018 leaving the northern part of St. Joseph Peninsula State Park on an island. The breach partially filled in naturally by March 2019. The state also brought in sand to restore dunes. As of 2026, the gap in the peninsula has been filled in and the road rebuilt.

== See also ==
- Thermoluminescence sand-migration analysis of St. Joseph Peninsula
- Saint Joseph, namesake
