= Charlotte Harbor Light =

Lighthouse in Florida, US

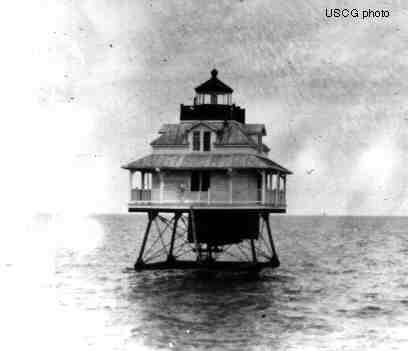
- The Charlotte Harbor lighthouse (from U.S. Coast Guard archives)
- Location: Charlotte Harbor, on the channel to Punta Gorda, Florida
- Coordinates: 26°46′33″N 82°8′31″W

Tower
- Foundation: iron pilings
- Construction: wood
- Automated: 1918
- Shape: square house

Light
- First lit: 1890
- Deactivated: 1943
- Lens: fifth-order Fresnel lens

The Charlotte Harbor Light was placed at a bend in the deeper part of Charlotte Harbor to guide ships to the railroad docks in Punta Gorda, Florida. Punta Gorda lost importance as a port when railroad lines reached Boca Grande on the southern end of Gasparilla Island at the entrance to Charlotte Harbor in 1906. The lighthouse steadily deteriorated and had to be demolished in 1943. The iron pilings were removed in 1975.
