= Cape San Blas Light =

Lighthouse in Florida, US

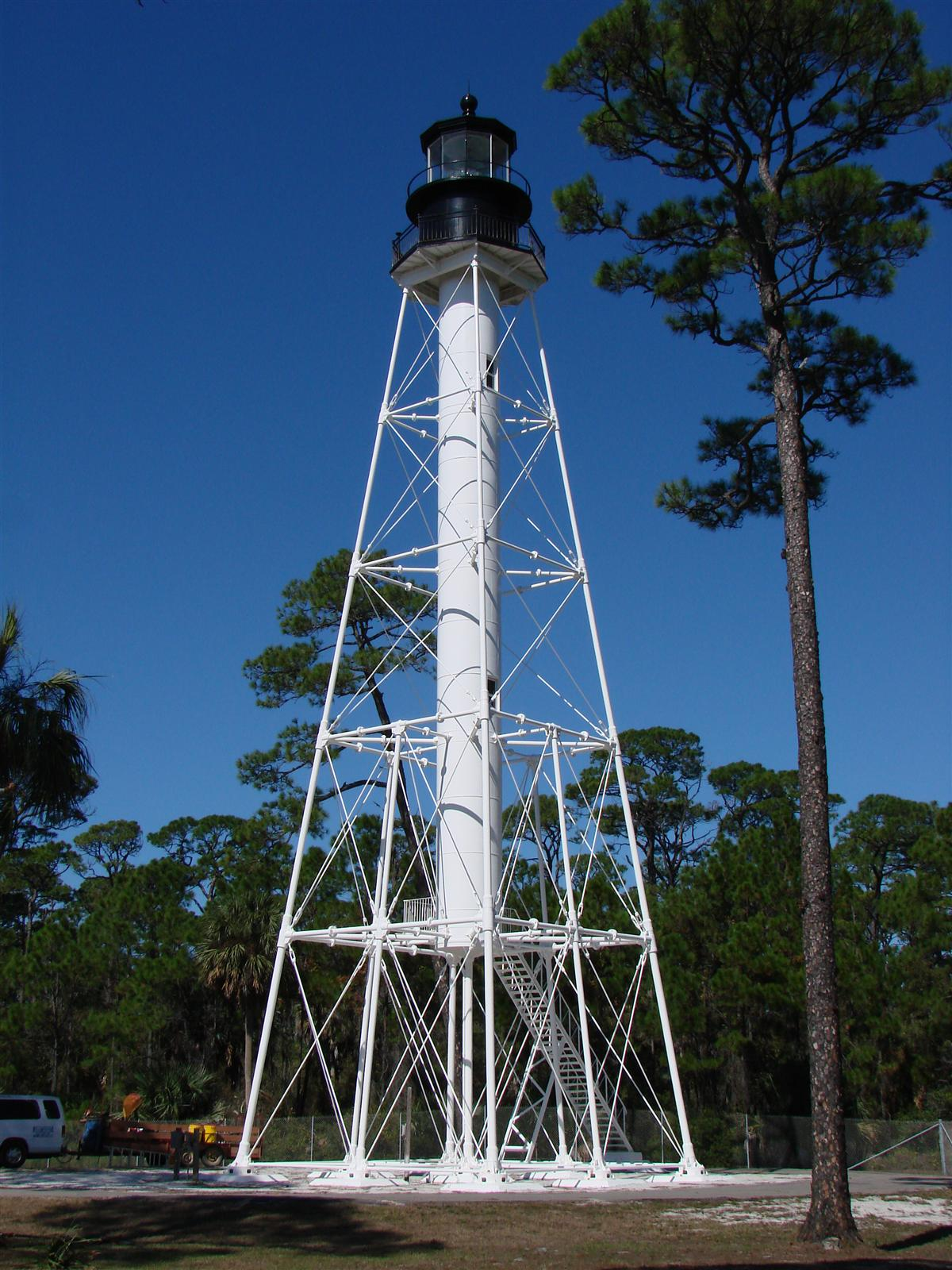
- Cape San Blas Light before 2014 move
- Location: Cape San Blas southwest of Port St. Joe; Florida; United States
- Coordinates: 29.813199°N 85.306499°W

Tower
- Constructed: 1849 (first); 1856 (second); 1858 (third); 1885 (fourth)
- Foundation: iron piling
- Construction: cast iron skeletal tower
- Automated: 1981
- Height: 98 feet (30 m)
- Shape: square pyramidal skeleton tower with central cylinder, balcony and lantern
- Markings: white tower, black lantern
- Operator: St. Joseph Historical Society (Cape San Blas Lighthouse)
- Heritage: National Register of Historic Places listed place

Light
- First lit: 1885 (current)
- Deactivated: 1996
- Focal height: 101 feet (31 m)
- Lens: Third order Fresnel lens (1859); Third order bivalve Fresnel lens (1906)
- Range: 14 nautical miles; 26 kilometres (16 mi)
- Characteristic: Fl W 20s.
- Cape San Blas Light and Keeper's Quarters
- U.S. National Register of Historic Places
- Nearest city: Port St. Joe, Florida
- NRHP reference No.: 81000723
- Added to NRHP: January 15, 1981

The Cape San Blas Light is a lighthouse in the state of Florida in the United States. Four different structures were built between 1849 and 1885 to house the light. It was located at Cape San Blas in the northwestern part of the state. Due to beach erosion and weather damage over the decades, the final structure was moved multiple times, including to Port St. Joe in 2014. The lighthouse was listed on the National Register of Historic Places in 2015.

== History ==
The first Cape San Blas Light was completed in 1849 with an appropriation of $8,000 made 2 years earlier. The shoals running out from the cape extended 3.5 or 4.3 nautical miles; 6.4 or 8.0 kilometres (4 or 5 mi) and made it dangerous for all vessels nearing the coast. If the light had been high enough it could have been seen for 17 nautical miles; 32 kilometres (20 mi) and afforded protection to vessels going to and from Tortugas to New Orleans, but the light from the 85-or-90-foot (26 or 27 m) tower was visible only half that distance. The site was "deemed to be entirely secure from overflow or inundation" by the collector of customs at Apalachicola, Florida, who selected it, with the assistance of "two of our most experienced pilots."

The lighthouse erected in 1849 then "fell down during a gale in the autumn of 1851" and on August 31, 1852, Congress appropriated $12,000 for rebuilding it. The new structure was completed in 1856. It had been completed only a few months when during the severe storm of August 30, 1856, it was destroyed. "The sea rose so high," the United States Lighthouse Board reported, "that the waves struck the floor of the keeper’s dwelling, elevated 8 feet [2.4 m] above the ground, and about 14 feet [4.3 m] above the ordinary tides. A lagoon now occupies the site of the lighthouse." On March 3, 1857, Congress, for the third time, appropriated money for a lighthouse at Cape San Blas. This appropriation was for $20,000 and the new lighthouse was first lighted with a third-order lens on May 1, 1858.

The light station sustained serious damage at the hands of Union troops aboard the USS Kingfisher that landed in 1862 during the Civil War. The keeper's dwelling was completely destroyed and the door frames and sashes of the tower were torn or burnt out. Repairs were made, a new illuminating apparatus was provided, and the light was re-exhibited on July 23, 1865. In 1869 the beach in front of the lighthouse was reported to be washing away and would need protection against encroachments of the sea during heavy storms. In 1877 Congress appropriated $2,000 for protecting the site after the Lighthouse Board had reported 2 years earlier "The base of the tower is very nearly at the same level as the sea, which is but little more than 150 feet distant, the shore being of shifting sand. In a violent hurricane, it is feared, the tower may be undermined." The Board had asked for $5,000 to protect the site and reported in 1879 that, as it was found "impracticable to build a jetty for $2,000 that can protect the site from the encroachment of the sea, no further action has been taken in the matter."

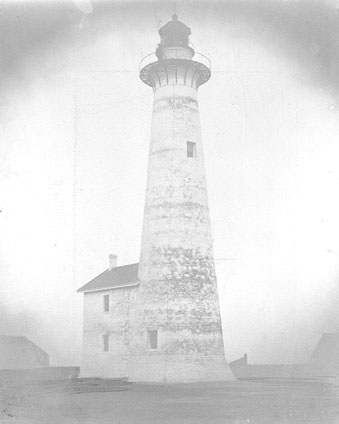
The third Cape San Blas lighthouse (built in 1859) was destroyed by a storm in 1882

Finally in 1881 the Board reported "The sea has been encroaching on this tower until its base is in the water. Brush mattresses were made, pinned down to the sand with small iron screw piles, covered with sand and occasionally blocks of concrete, to further check such encroachment, but the almost constant surf, beating against the mattresses, tore them to pieces. An appropriation for a new tower, further inland is badly needed. It is recommended that a skeleton iron tower be erected; then if the sea again encroaches, it could be taken down and re erected. The new tower will cost $25,000." The following year the Board noted "No appropriation was made; the site remained unprotected and on July 3, 1882, the tower was overthrown and completely destroyed." The Board strongly recommended that the tower be replaced on a safe site at an early date, there being no intervening light between San Blas and Pensacola, Florida, 120 miles (190 km or 220 km) distant.

An appropriation for a fourth tower was made available in 1883. The remains of the third tower were then 400 feet (120 m) distant from the shore, and the sea continued to erode the beach. By 1885 a fourth tower, a skeleton tower of iron, and two dwellings for keepers had been erected and the light was first displayed on June 30, 1885. The light had a third-order lens, showing alternate red and white flashes with 30 seconds intervals. The focal plane, 98 feet (30 m) above sea level, lit the entire horizon.

In 1887 the sea was reported again gradually cutting away the shore and during the year had washed away about one-third the distance to where the new tower had been built (300 feet or 100 m). Two years later only 200 feet (61 m) of beach remained and the Board reported "It is more than probable that this will be mostly washed away in the next 4 months." It was, therefore, recommended "that the tower and dwellings be taken down and removed to a point on the inside of the peninsula a little less than 1 1/2 miles [2.4 km], about northwest from its present position where there is a good site and 8 1/2 feet [2.6 m] of water, in St. Joseph Bay, within 400 or 500 yards (370 or 460 m) of it. This location is such that the bearing of the San Blas Shoals will be the same as now, and the increase of 1½ miles in the distance from the shore will be of little importance so far as its value as a coast light is concerned. It is estimated that to make the change will cost $20,000. The present site cannot be saved except at great cost."

Nothing had been done, however, by Congress and by early 1890 the tower was only 144 feet (44 m) from the sea at high-water mark. Later that year, however, an appropriation of $20,000 was made to remove the tower and dwellings to the point inside the peninsula. Condemnation proceedings to obtain title to the new site, however, dragged on until 1894 when on October 8 and October 9 a gale badly damaged the lighthouse extinguishing the light and wrecking the keeper's dwelling. So much of the cape was washed away that the tower now stood in the water.

Before the tower could be removed to the new site, it was decided in 1895 to remove the station to Black's Island, in St. Joseph Bay, which the President ordered reserved for lighthouse purposes. The work of dismantling the skeleton iron tower was begun in February 1896 and carried on until April 30 of that year when it was stopped because the appropriation was exhausted. The two keeper's houses had been relocated on Black's Island, the foundation for the tower was in place and three-fourths of the concrete work had been done, when it was estimated that $4,500 more would be required to finish the work. This was appropriated in June 1897.

Four months later, however, the light had been reestablished in the old tower, now in the water at the south point of Cape San Blas. In 1899 the Board reported "after careful consideration of all the conditions affecting the choice of a proper site, the Board has concluded that the light should be reconstructed on the shell ridge about 13 miles (21 km) N. by W. from its present location. It is estimated that this can be done at a cost not exceeding $15,000." This sum was appropriated on June 6, 1900, at which time the Board reported: "that the property and material stored at Black’s Island was being cared for by a watchman appointed for the purpose."

By 1901 nothing had been done about moving the tower and the Board reported "the advisability of removing the station to a new site is being considered, or of building a permanent keeper’s dwelling in place of the present temporary buildings, repairing the present light tower and permitting it to remain in the old location. The point of land on which the tower stands has made out until the beach at the nearest point is 100 or more feet distant from the tower. As this movement is increasing, it may become necessary to move the structure of the station to a new site." In 1903 the Board sought and obtained authority from Congress to use $7,000 of the $15,000 appropriated for moving the tower, to erect two keeper's dwellings at the old site. These were completed in 1905.

The light remained in the old tower until 1919. In 1916 it was reported "The sea is again making inroads on the station and a project for its removal has been tentatively approved." The new site was one-fourth mile (400 m) north of the old tower on the peninsula and on land heretofore reserved for military purposes, which the President forthwith reserved for lighthouse purposes. The tower was moved to this site in 1919. In 1923 the Black's Island reservation was sold. There were no buildings on the island at the time.

The light is now in a white, square skeleton tower, enclosing a stair cylinder, with the lantern 96 feet (29 m) above ground and 101 feet (31 m) above water. The 800,000 candela 3-foot 2-order electric light flashes white every 20 seconds and is visible 16 miles (26 km or 30 km). A radiobeacon was established at the station in 1939.

As of June 2012, the light has been added to the lighthouse Doomsday List.

== Head keepers ==
- Francis Avrion (1848–1849)
- Rufus Ballard (1849–1851)
- Joseph Ridler (1855–1857)
- Francis Lee (1859)
- James Weatherspoon (1859–1861)
- Joseph Leucroft (1866)
- Braddock Williams (1866–1868)
- Merrill Hussey (1868–1869)
- William H. Parker (1869–1871)
- William G. Cox (1871–1873)
- Henry Humphries (1873–1874)
- Thomas Coleman (1874–1876)
- Demetrius J. Murat (1876–1879)
- Thomas Gordon (1880–1882)
- Benjamin Curry (1882)
- illiam D. Archer (1882–1886)
- illiam Quinn (1886–1895)
- Charles Lupton (1895–1902)
- Walter Andrew Roberts Sr. (1902–1909)
- William J. Knickmeyer (1909–at least 1921)
- Louis Buras (1924–1925)
- J. Ray Linton (at least 1930–1932)
- Sullivan R. White (1933–1939)
- Frank Spongia (1939–1942)

== Relocation ==
In July 2014, the lighthouse and two keepers' quarters were moved from Cape San Blas to George Core Park in Port St. Joe. 29.813217°N 85.306517°W

== Gallery ==
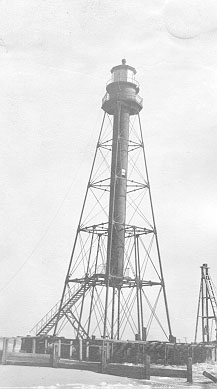
The current (and fourth) Cape San Blas lighthouse was built in 1885

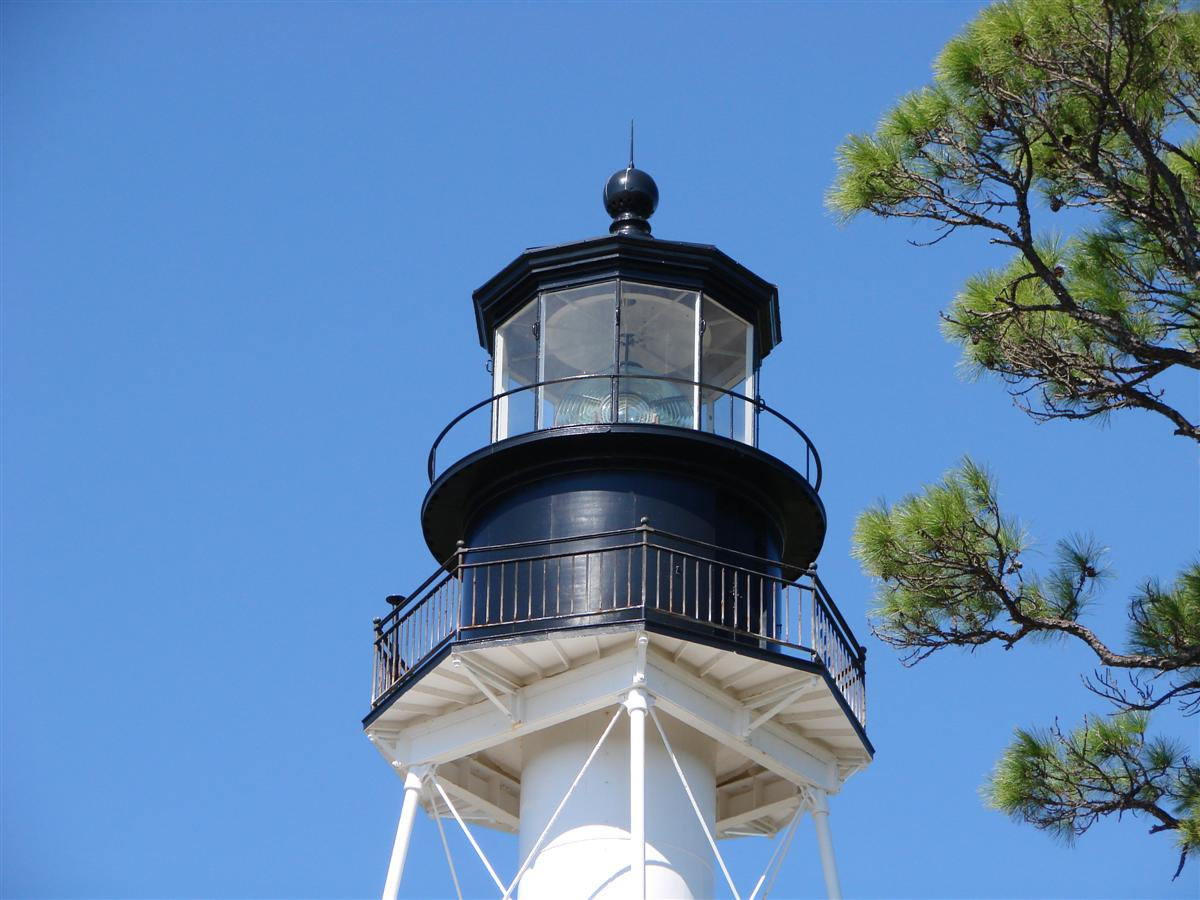
Closeup of lantern room

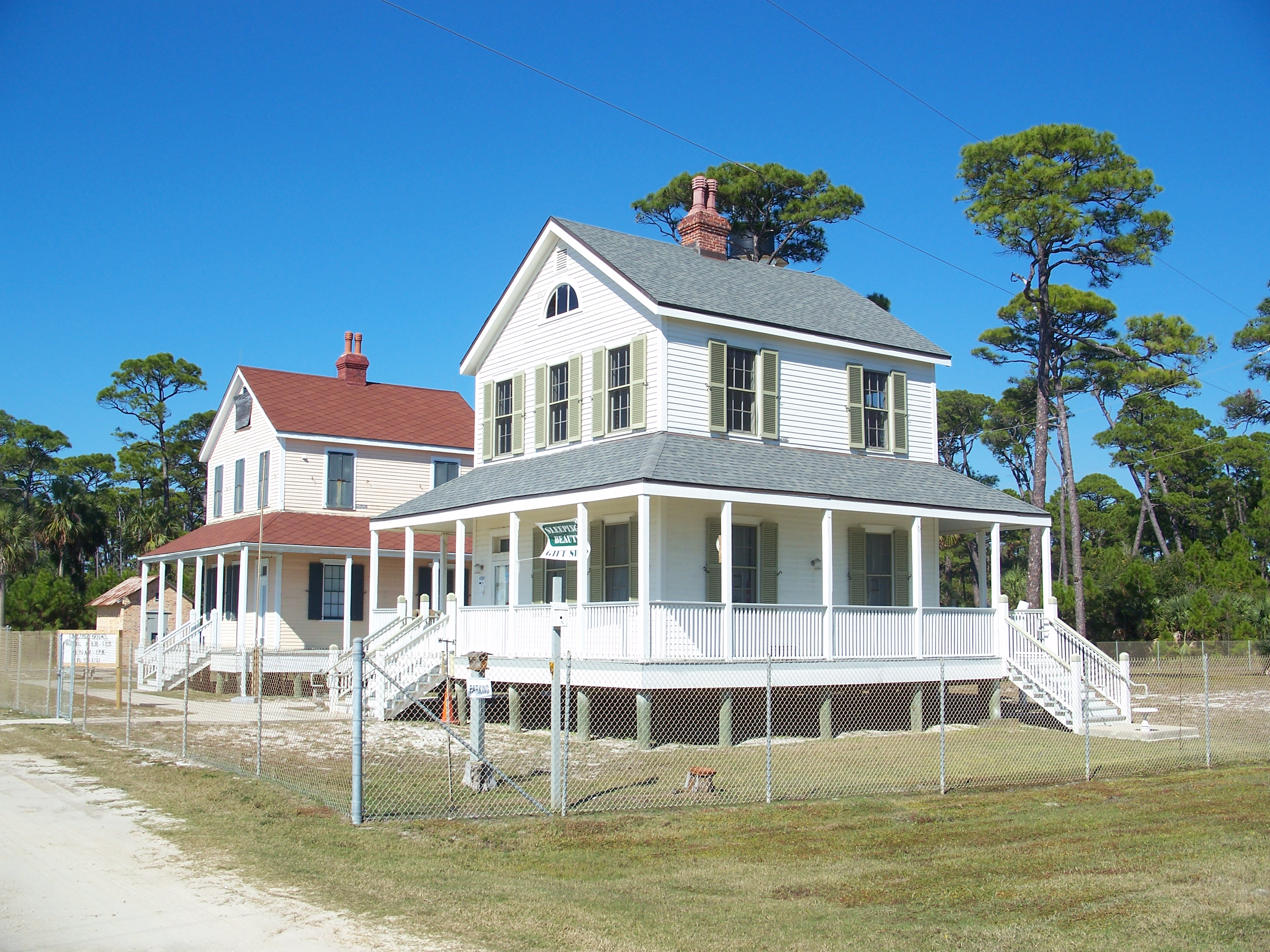
Keepers' quarters
