= St. Joseph Bay =

Bay in Gulf County, Florida, US

Coordinates: 29°48′04″N 85°20′31″W

St. Joseph Bay, Florida

Map of Florida, highlighting Gulf County

St. Joseph Bay is a bay on the Gulf Coast of the U.S. state of Florida. The bay is located in Gulf County between Apalachicola and Panama City. Port St. Joe is located on St. Joseph Bay.

St. Joseph Bay is bounded on the east by the mainland, on the south by Cape San Blas, and on the west by the St. Joseph Peninsula. The north end of the bay is a relatively narrow opening to the Gulf of Mexico. The bay is approximately 15 miles (24 km) long north to south and 6 miles (9.7 km) wide at its widest point.

The waters of St. Joseph Bay contain the St. Joseph Bay State Buffer Preserve and the St. Joseph Bay Aquatic Preserve. The St. Joseph Peninsula forms the St. Joseph Peninsula State Park.

== History ==
The Spanish established Presidio Bahía San José de Valladares on St. Joseph Bay in 1701. The French established Fort Crevecoeur on the shores of St. Joseph Bay opposite St. Joseph Point, the northern end of the St. Joseph Peninsula, in 1717, and captured the Presidio Bahía San José de Valladares the next year. Under pressure from Spain, the French then abandoned Fort Crevecoeur. The Spanish established the Presidio Bahía San José de Nueva Asturias on St. Joseph Point in 1719, but abandoned it in 1722.

The boom town of St. Joseph was founded on the shores of St. Joseph Bay in 1835. The town briefly prospered, but a yellow fever epidemic in 1841 drove most of the residents away and the town was soon abandoned. The St. Joseph Bay Light was established on St. Joseph Point in 1838, to serve the new town's port. The light was discontinued in 1847, after the town had been abandoned, and the unused tower was destroyed in a storm in 1851. A new lighthouse, the St. Joseph Light Range Station, was constructed in 1902 on the mainland across from St. Joseph Point, at Beacon Hill.

A new town, Port St. Joe, was founded a couple of miles north of the site of the old town of St. Joseph around 1910, when the Apalachicola Northern Railroad built a branch line to the Bay.

== Wildlife ==
St. Joseph Bay is known in the area for its abundant scallop habitats. Open-harvest season for bay scallops along Florida's Gulf coast typically runs from July 1 through September 24.
