= National Register of Historic Places listings in Osceola County, Florida =

Location of Osceola County in Florida

This is a list of the National Register of Historic Places listings in Osceola County, Florida.

This is intended to be a complete list of the properties and districts on the National Register of Historic Places in Osceola County, Florida, United States. The locations of National Register properties and districts for which the latitude and longitude coordinates are included below, may be seen in a map.

There are 10 properties and districts listed on the National Register in the county. A site was once listed, but has been removed.

This National Park Service list is complete through NPS recent listings posted December 19, 2025.

Contents: Counties in Florida (non-linked contain no National Register listings)
Alachua - Baker - Bay - Bradford - Brevard - Broward - Calhoun - Charlotte - Citrus - Clay - Collier - Columbia - DeSoto - Dixie - Duval - Escambia - Flagler - Franklin - Gadsden - Gilchrist - Glades - Gulf - Hamilton - Hardee - Hendry - Hernando - Highlands - Hillsborough (Tampa) - Holmes - Indian River - Jackson - Jefferson - Lafayette - Lake - Lee - Leon - Levy - Liberty - Madison - Manatee - Marion - Martin - Miami-Dade (Miami) - Monroe - Nassau - Okaloosa - Okeechobee - Orange - Osceola - Palm Beach - Pasco - Pinellas - Polk - Putnam - St. Johns - St. Lucie - Santa Rosa - Sarasota - Seminole - Sumter - Suwannee - Taylor - Union - Volusia - Wakulla - Walton - Washington

== Current listings ==
	Name on the Register	Image	Date listed	Location	City or town	Description
1	Colonial Estate	Colonial Estate	January 3, 1994 (#93001455)	2450 Old Dixie Highway; 28°18′59″N 81°24′13″W	Kissimmee	Part of the Kissimmee MPS
2	First United Methodist Church	First United Methodist Church	January 3, 1994 (#93001457)	215 East Church Street; 28°17′22″N 81°24′24″W	Kissimmee	Part of the Kissimmee MPS
3	Grand Army of the Republic Memorial Hall	Grand Army of the Republic Memorial Hall	February 21, 1997 (#97000097)	1101 Massachusetts Avenue; 28°14′51″N 81°17′05″W	St. Cloud	
4	Kissimmee Historic District	Kissimmee Historic District	January 4, 1994 (#93001454)	Roughly bounded by Aultman Street, Monument Avenue, Penfield Street, and Randolph Avenue; 28°17′31″N 81°24′40″W	Kissimmee	Part of the Kissimmee MPS
5	Monument of States	Monument of States	December 8, 2015 (#15000862)	East Monument Avenue & Lakeview Drive; 28°17′30″N 81°24′17″W	Kissimmee	
6	Old Holy Redeemer Catholic Church	Old Holy Redeemer Catholic Church	January 3, 1994 (#93001456)	120 North Spoule Avenue; 28°17′45″N 81°24′24″W	Kissimmee	Part of the Kissimmee MPS
7	Osceola County Courthouse	Osceola County Courthouse	August 16, 1977 (#77000406)	Bounded by Emmett, Bryan, Rose, and Vernon Streets; 28°17′28″N 81°24′42″W	Kissimmee	
8	St. Cloud Depot	St. Cloud Depot	July 31, 2018 (#100002728)	915 New York Avenue; 28°14′57″N 81°17′01″W	St. Cloud	
9	St. Cloud Downtown Historic District	St. Cloud Downtown Historic District	June 12, 2023 (#100009031)	Roughly bounded by 9th St., Wisconsin Ave., Ohio Ave., and US 192; 28°14′51″N 81°17′05″W	St. Cloud	
10	Veterans Memorial Library and Woman's Club of St. Cloud Auditorium	Veterans Memorial Library and Woman's Club of St. Cloud Auditorium	August 3, 2020 (#100005413)	1012-1014 Massachusetts Ave. 28°14′55″N 81°17′05″W	St. Cloud	

== Former listings ==
	Name on the Register	Image	Date listed	Date removed	Location	City or town	Description
1	Desert Inn	Desert Inn	January 3, 1994 (#93001158)	January 14, 2026	5570 South Kenansville Road; 27°42′00″N 80°54′18″W	Yeehaw Junction	

== See also ==
- List of National Historic Landmarks in Florida
- National Register of Historic Places listings in Florida
