= Jon B. Morgan Osceola County Courthouse =

Courthouse in Florida

New Osceola County Courthouse
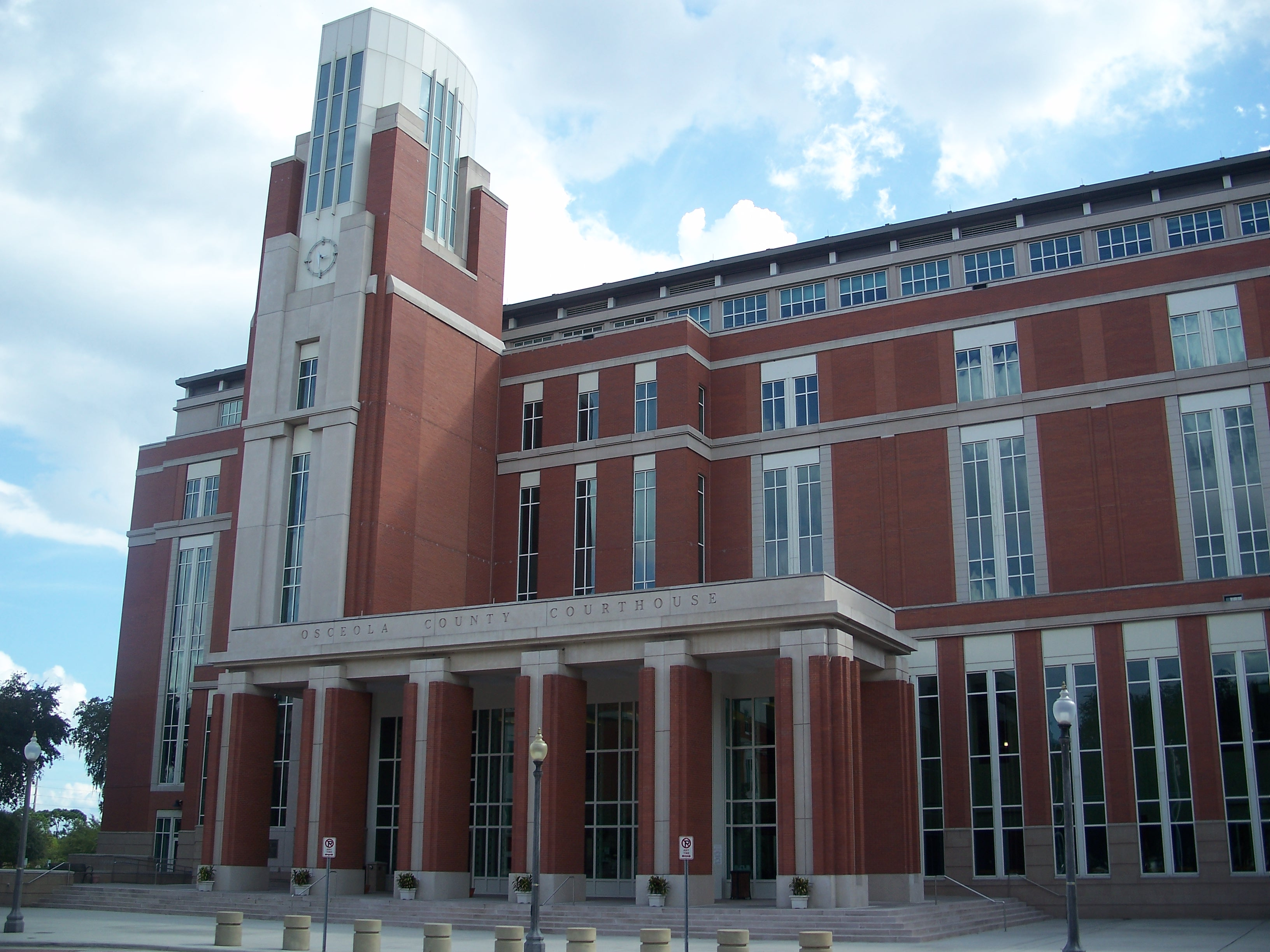
- Interactive map of the New Osceola County Courthouse area

General information
- Location: 2 Courthouse Square; Kissimmee, Florida, United States
- Coordinates: 28.2904°N 81.4113°W
- Completed: 2001
- Client: Osceola County, Florida

The Jon B. Morgan Osceola County Courthouse, also known simply as the New Osceola County Courthouse, is the current location of the Office of the Osceola County Clerk of the Circuit Court & County Comptroller. It is located across the street from the Old Osceola County Courthouse, which is listed on the National Register of Historic Places. The entire judicial complex is located in the downtown historic district of Kissimmee, Florida, the county seat of Osceola County. The new courthouse contains the Ninth Judicial Circuit Court of Florida and its associated offices, along with the Osceola County Court. It also includes offices for the state attorney, the public defender, and the county sheriff.

== See also ==
- Courts of Florida
