= Gateway Airport =

Gateway Airport may refer to:

- Phoenix-Mesa Gateway Airport, an airport located 20 miles southeast of Phoenix, Arizona
- Kissimmee Gateway Airport, an airport located 16 miles southwest of Orlando, Florida
- Sioux Gateway Airport, an airport located in Sioux Falls, Iowa
