= The Loop (Kissimmee) =

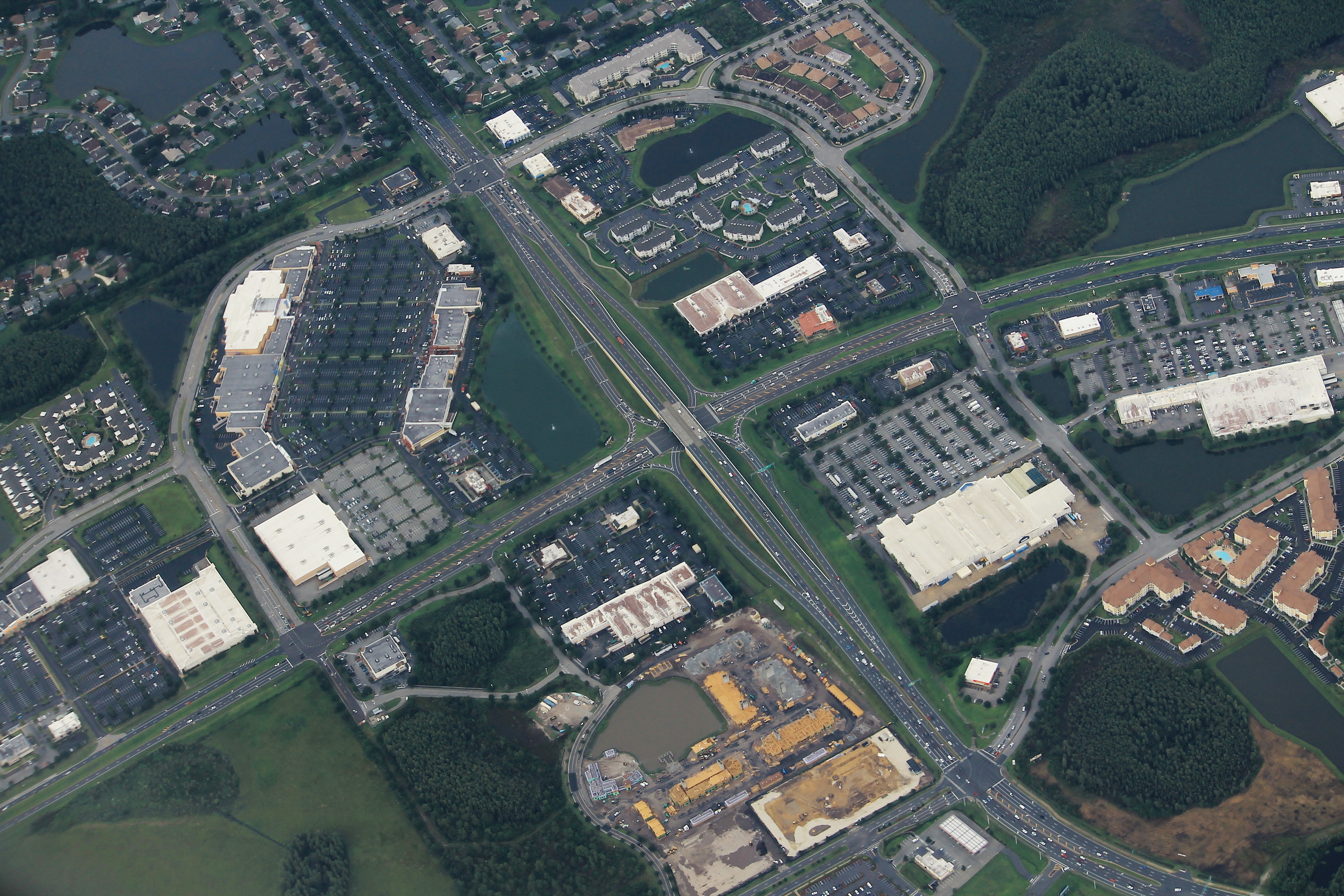
- Aerial view of the mall
- Location: Kissimmee, Florida
- Coordinates: 28.3442°N 81.4244°W
- Address: 3208 North John Young Parkway; Kissimmee, FL 34741
- Opened: 2007
- Owner: The Wilder Companies
- Floor area: 840,000 square feet (78,000 m^{2})
- Floors: 1
- Parking: Parking lot
- Public transit: 57
- Website: http://www.experiencetheloop.com

The Loop in Kissimmee, Florida is an outdoor mall located at the corner of John Young Parkway and Osceola Parkway. It is split into two sections: Loop West and Loop East. Shops and attractions include a Regal Entertainment Group movie theater, Kohl's, JCPenney, Books-A-Million, Michael's, Nike Clearance Store, several specialty stores, and restaurants.
