= Momo Thomas =

American football player (born 1990)

Profile
- Position: Cornerback

Personal information
- Born: April 14, 1990 (age 36); Kissimmee, Florida, U.S.
- Listed height: 5 ft 9 in (1.75 m)
- Listed weight: 185 lb (84 kg)

Career information
- High school: Osceola (Kissimmee)
- College: Colorado State
- NFL draft: 2013: undrafted

Career history
- Atlanta Falcons (2013)*
- * Offseason or practice squad member only

Gerard "Momo" Santwan Thomas (born April 14, 1990) is an American former football cornerback. After playing college football for Colorado State University, he was signed by the Atlanta Falcons as an undrafted free agent in 2013.

== Early life ==
"Momo" was born in Kissimmee, Florida, to Barry Thomas and Alousa Chappell. He has 11 siblings. His brothers are Greg, Javon, Richard, Tyuan and Santae. His sisters are Sophia, Shala, Theila, Kayla and Chardae. His family friend T'Sharvan Bell joined him at Osceola High. Bobby Sippio, his cousin, played football as a wide receiver for Western Kentucky University in college, and now plays in the National Football League (NFL) for the Kansas City Chiefs . Amar'e Stoudemire has been a close family friend of his.

== College career ==
=== 2008 season ===
Out of the 13 games that Colorado State University played in 2008, Thomas got playing time in all of them as a Freshman, starting 10 times, with the inclusion of the New Mexico Bowl. He was 1/5 of the CSU true Freashmen that year. He finished the year off with 54 tackles, 38 of them being solo tackles. Three of these 54 tackles had also been for a loss. He broke up three passes and had an interception, which would have been a touchdown, if it weren't for a penalty that was called against them.

=== 2009 season ===
His playing time had been cut short two games from the previous year, only playing in 11 games. His starts had also dropped by two, starting in 8 games. Because of this, of course, his stats had dropped from the 2008 season as well, but not drastically. He still managed to earn 43 tackles, with one being for a loss of yards. He had made 31 of these tackles solo. He snatched an interception in addition.

=== 2010 season ===
As a Junior, he had to undergo surgery for his right shoulder. This forced Gerard to miss the majority of the season. He had only managed to get 13 tackles, 8 solo. Although he got another interception, too.

=== 2011 season ===
Back after shoulder surgery in 2010, he played in 11 games, starting in every one. His interception stat had increased by one, catching two of them. He recorded 31 tackles, one for a loss, 15 solo. With one of those tackles, he had forced the ballcarrier to fumble. He forced one, and recovered a fumble, too. To top it all off, he had 7 pass breakups.

=== 2012 season ===
It was a disappointing season in 2012, as "Momo" started in the first three games for the Rams before hurting his shoulder and ending his season.

== Professional career ==
Thomas signed with the Atlanta Falcons as an undrafted free agent on April 29, 2013. He was waived on May 9, 2013.
