= Monument of States =

- U.S. National Register of Historic Places
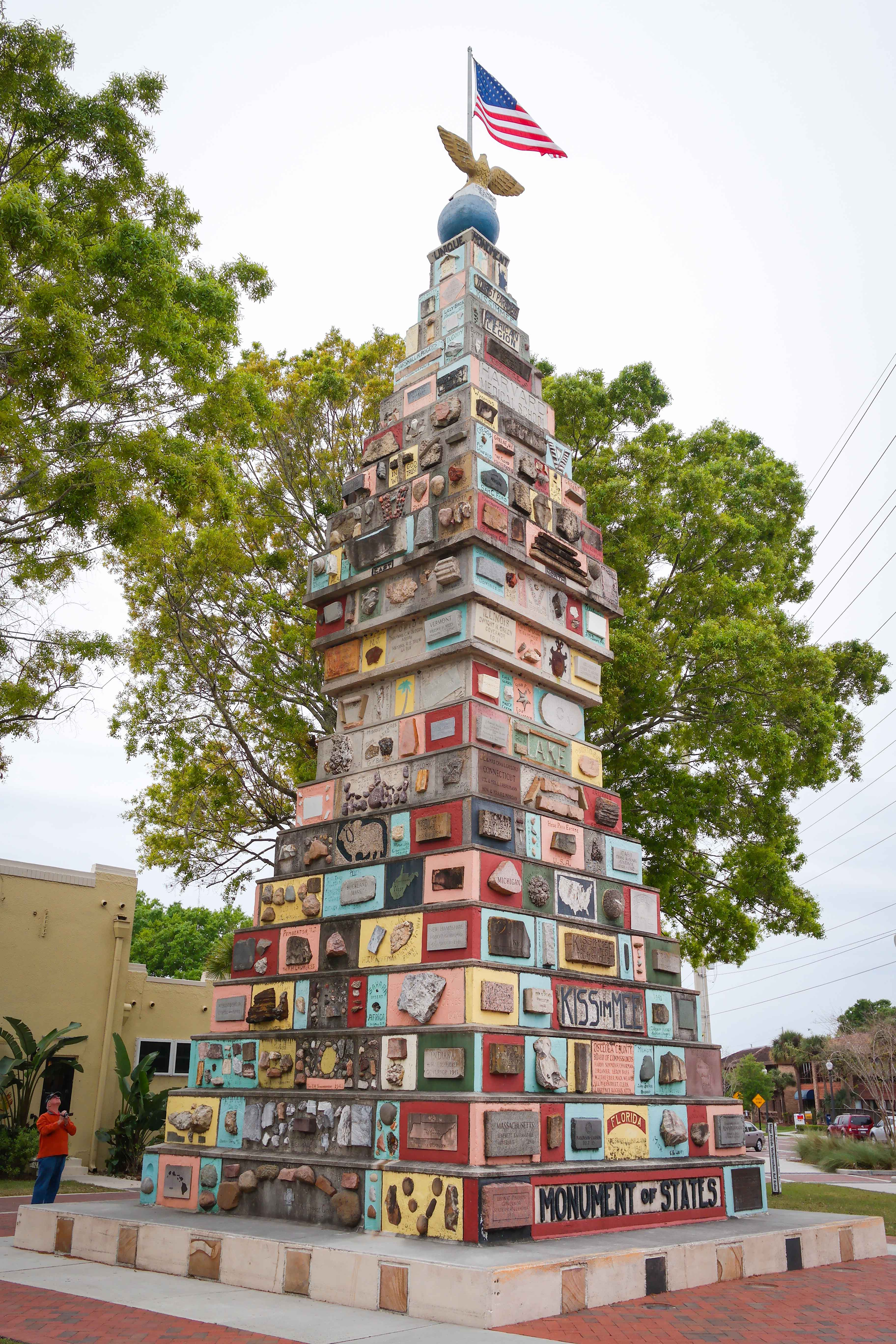
- Monument of States

- Location within Florida Location within the United States
- Nearest city: Kissimmee, Florida
- Coordinates: 28.291676°N 81.404604°W
- Built: 1943
- Architect: Charles W. Bressler-Pettis, J. C. Fisher
- NRHP reference No.: 15000862
- Added to NRHP: December 8, 2015

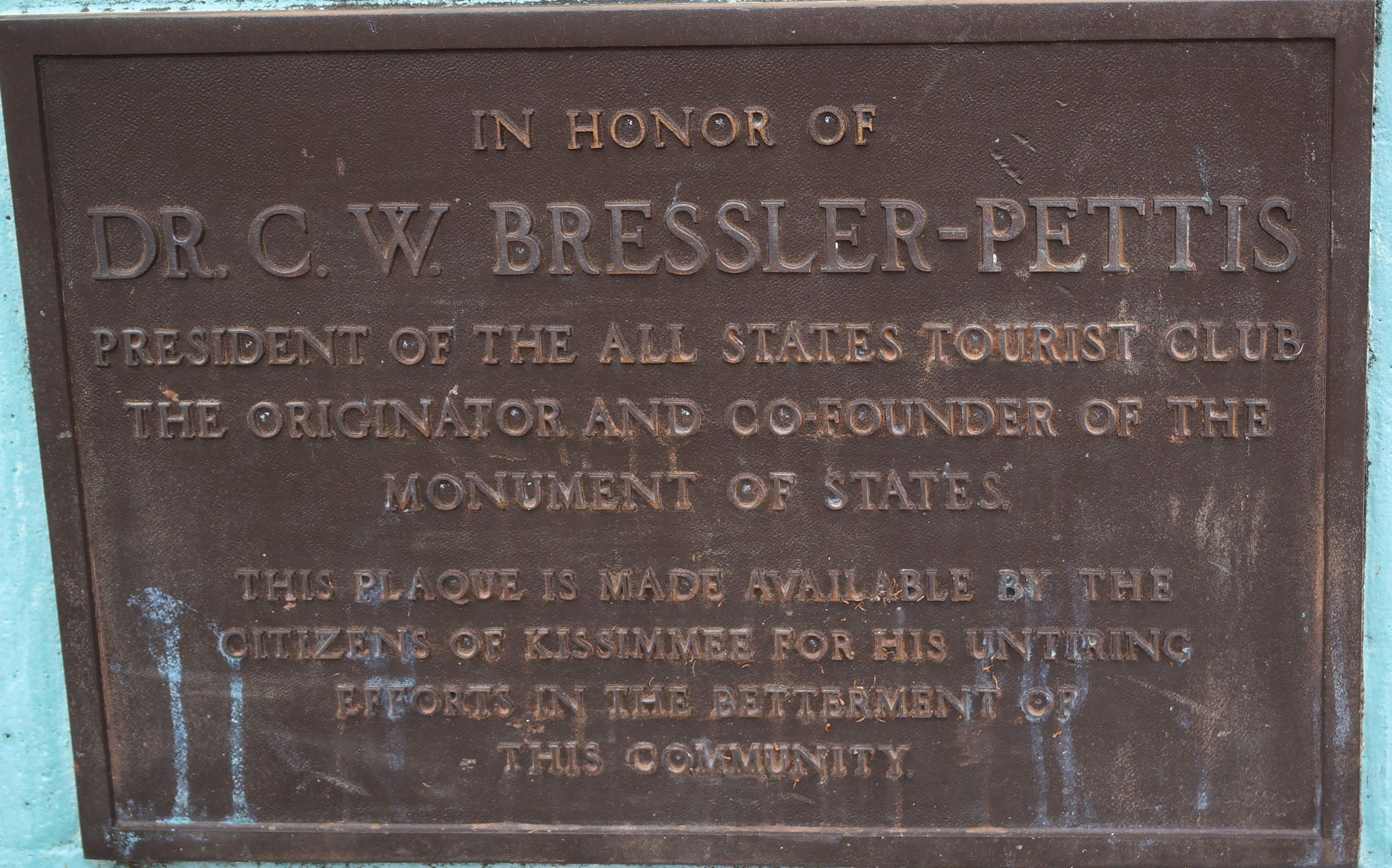
Plaque at the base of the monument, honoring Dr. C. W. Bressler-Pettis

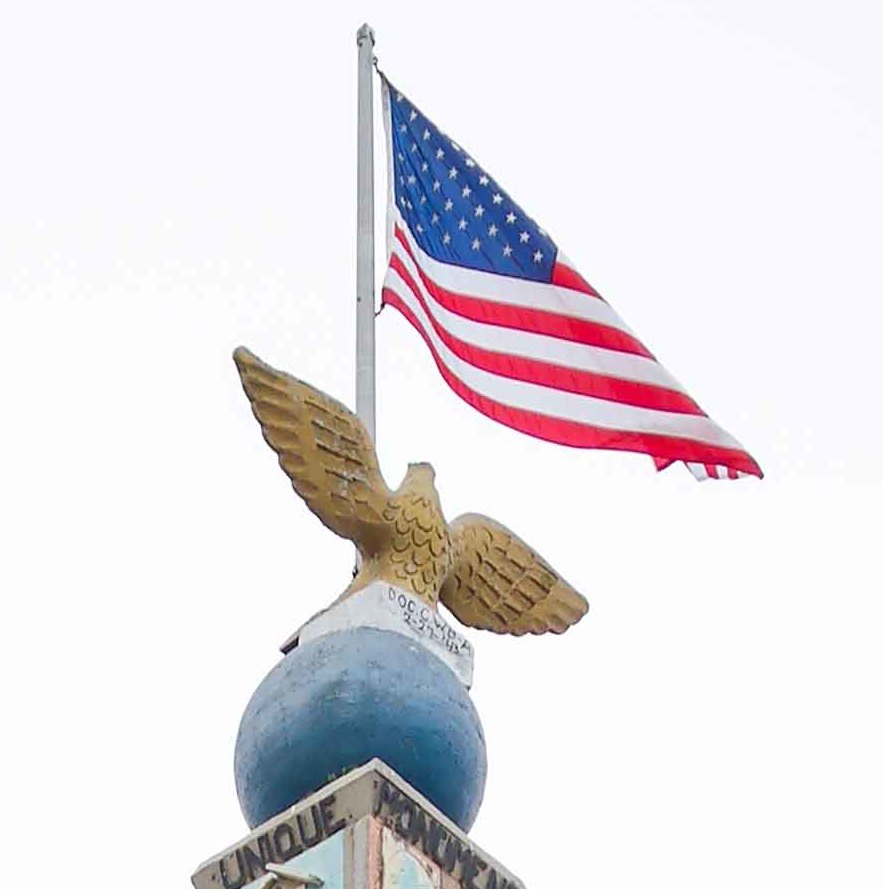
Eagle at top of the monument

The Monument of States was conceived as a symbol of American unity after the attack on Pearl Harbor, and is located at 300 E. Monument Avenue in Kissimmee, Florida. It was built by volunteers, with donations of stone that came from around the world, including a rock from President Franklin D. Roosevelt. It was the brainchild of Charles W. Bressler-Pettis, who also hoped it would become a unique tourist attraction for the city.

== Conception and design ==
When the United States came under attack from the Empire of Japan on December 7, 1941, Charles W. Bressler-Pettis was a retired physician living in Florida, and was president of the Kissimmee All-States Tourist club that catered to senior citizens. He had served in both the Royal Army Medical Corps and the United States Army during World War I. Pettis devised an idea to erect a unique monument in Kissimmee that he hoped would inspire American solidarity in response to the attack. As a promoter of local tourism, Pettis was also looking to draw visitors to Kissimmee with a unique attraction. He enlisted his friend J. C. Fisher to work with him on designing a monument that would contain a rock from each state. The result of Pettis's collaboration with Fisher was a step-pyramid weighing an estimated 100,000 pounds and reinforced with 3 ½ tons of steel rails. At the top sits an American eagle and a flag of the United States, resting on a blue concrete orb.

Speculation has been offered by the National Park Service and others that it is possible Pettis might have been influenced by the Fireplace of States in Bemidji, Minnesota. Built by the Works Progress Administration in 1934–35, the Bemidji fireplace was constructed with stones from each of the then 48 states (Alaska and Hawaii were considered territories at the time of the monument's construction and would not become states until 1959).

== Construction ==
The Florida monument was built entirely through volunteer labor, mostly the senior citizens of the travel club. Governors of each state received letters from Pettis asking for rock donations to build the monument. Local government and civic organizations, as well as area businesses and individual residents, donated time and materials, including 507 donations of one bag of cement each. Those in Kissimmee who contributed in any manner have their names inscribed on the adjacent sidewalk. Pettis had amassed a collection of thousands of rocks in his travels and donated many of them to the project. President Franklin D. Roosevelt donated a rock from his estate in New York. By the time of its 1943 completion and dedication by Florida's United States Senator Claude Pepper, it was composed of 1,500 stones and objects donated from all over the world.

When Pettis died in 1954, Kissimmee changed its regulations on burials to permit a portion of his remains to be sealed inside the work. A plaque honoring Pettis was placed on the monument.

== Restoration and NRHP ==
As tourism was drawn away by the 1971 opening of Walt Disney World in Orlando, the Kissimmee monument fell into neglect and disrepair. On March 28, 1993, the city of Kissimmee had a re-dedication of the monument and sealed a time capsule within it. The American Automobile Association stepped in to help restore it in 2001.

The monument was added to the National Register of Historic Places on December 8, 2015.
