= Orange World =

Gift shop in Kissimmee, Florida, United States

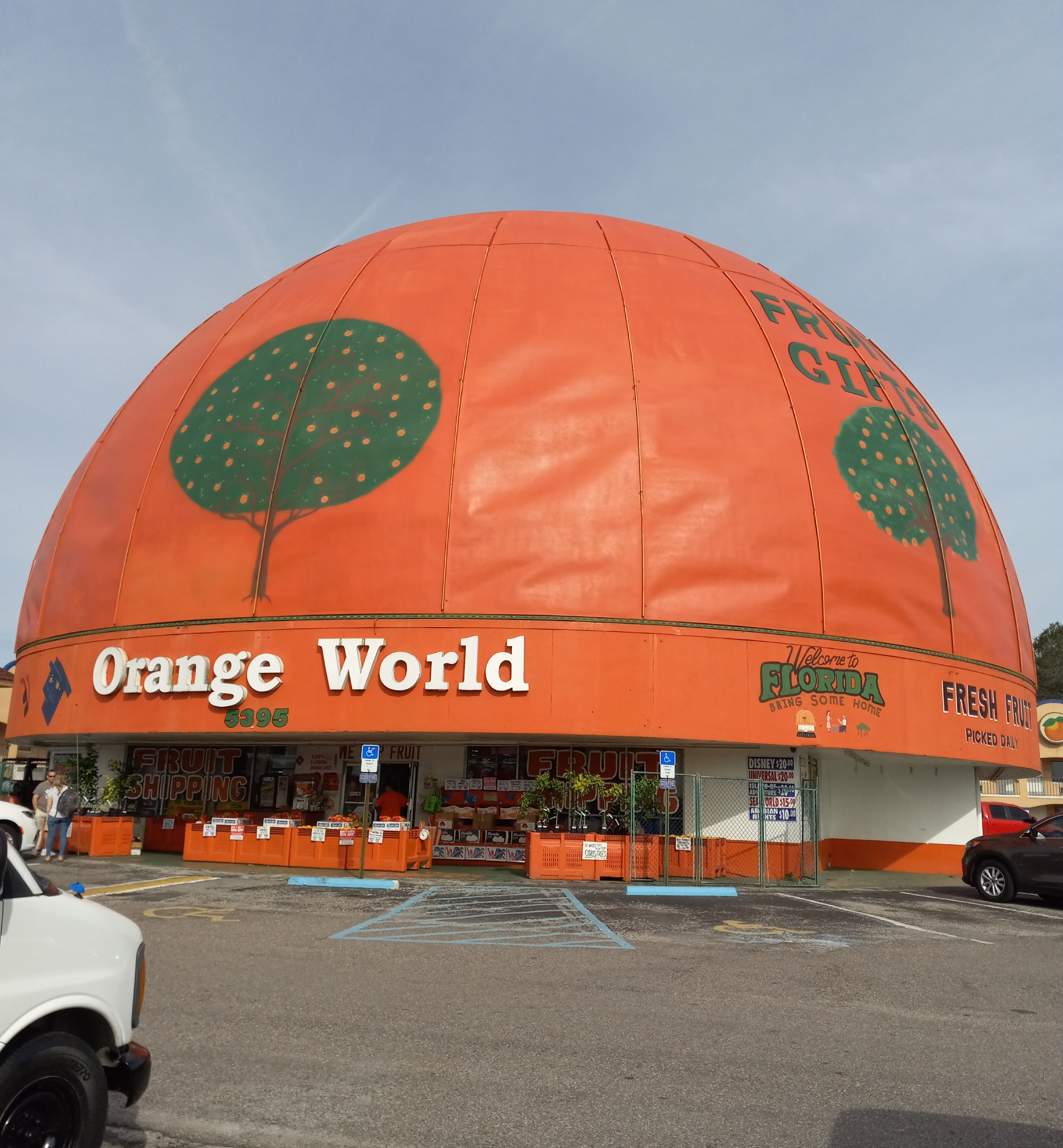
Orange World in January 2022

Eli's Orange World is a large orange-shaped fruit stand and gift shop in Kissimmee, Florida, United States, located along U.S. Route 192.

== History ==
Eli Sfassie moved from Indiana to Florida to open a Texaco gas station near Walt Disney World when the park opened in 1971. To further capitalize off tourists in the area, Sfassie began selling souvenirs in the service bay. In 1988, he had the building converted to resemble an orange fruit for $6,000. The building has been billed as the "world's largest orange" by Sfassie and stands at 60 feet (18 m) tall.

In 2004, gusts of wind from Hurricane Charley damaged the storefront sign of the nearby Giant Wizard gift shop, causing a large decoy crystal ball that was part of it to dislodge and impact the roof of Orange World, leaving a dent in the structure. The ball was reportedly never found.

On March 7, 2023, around 6pm EST, a fire broke out in the storage area above the gift shop. As a result, the store suffered major smoke damage on the interior.

Previously, the gift shop sold fresh citrus fruits, juice, and orange trees at the fruit stand by the entrance, with souvenirs as well as snacks and food such as citrus candies, alligator jerky, marmalades, and jellies located inside. As of October 2023, due to the fire damage, merchandise was temporarily sold outside the shop at the entrance, and the interior remained closed.

As of October 3, 2024, the newly repaired and remodeled interior has reopened and the store is operating back inside. Oranges and other citrus are still displayed outside as they were prior to the fire in March 2023.
