= First United Methodist Church (Kissimmee, Florida) =

Historic church in Florida, United States

- U.S. National Register of Historic Places
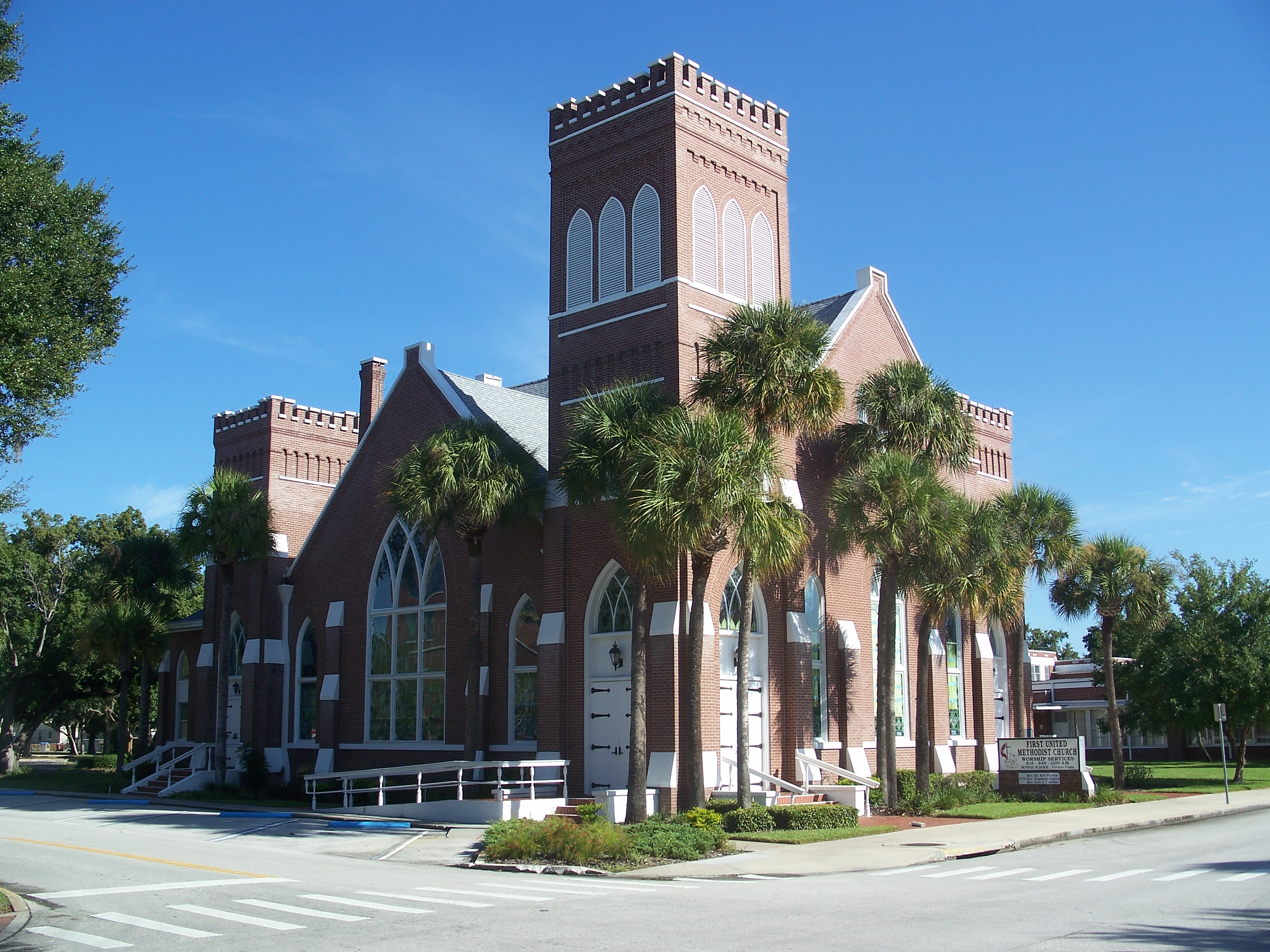
- The main sanctuary building facing Church Street

- Location within Florida Location within the United States
- Location: Kissimmee, Florida
- Coordinates: 28°17′22″N 81°24′24″W
- Architect: S. S. Buzza; L. M. Weatherly
- Architectural style: Late Gothic Revival
- NRHP reference No.: 93001457
- Added to NRHP: January 3, 1994

The First United Methodist Church is a historic Methodist church complex in Kissimmee, Florida. It was built in 1913 in the Late Gothic Revival style, the complex includes the red brick main sanctuary and the adjacent former Holy Redeemer Catholic Church, later renamed the Wesley Memorial Chapel. The property was added to the National Register of Historic Places on January 3, 1994, as part of the Kissimmee Multiple Property Submission.

== History ==
The local Methodist congregation was organized in 1882 under the leadership of circuit rider preacher Edward F. Ley, originally operating as part of the Methodist Episcopal Church South. Early services were held inside a one room schoolhouse on Main Street until land was acquired on Church Street for a permanent home.

Construction on the current main sanctuary began on January 21, 1913, using plans designed by architects S. S. Buzza and L. M. Weatherly. Over the years, the church complex expanded to meet the needs of the growing congregation, incorporating a Sunday school building at 219 Church Street and administrative offices at 116 North Sproule Street.

== Architecture and Significance ==
The main sanctuary is a red brick building built on a T-shaped plan. It stands as an important local example of Late Gothic Revival ecclesiastical architecture in Osceola County. The exterior walls are divided into bays by brick buttresses capped with cast stone, with each bay holding a pointed arch stained glass window.

A prominent two story square bell tower stands at the northwest corner of the building and serves as the main entrance porch. The tower features a belfry with louvered openings and is topped by a decorative, castellated roofline. The building is covered by an intersecting gable roof with exposed rafter ends under the eaves.

=== Wesley Memorial Chapel ===
The historic property also includes the former Holy Redeemer Catholic Church building, located next to the main sanctuary at 120 North Sproule Avenue. Built in 1912 for the local Catholic parish, this smaller one story brick Gothic Revival structure held its first mass on June 30, 1912.

The First United Methodist Church purchased the building in 1972 after the Catholic congregation outgrew the space and moved to a larger facility. The Methodists preserved the building for church activities, renaming it the Wesley Memorial Chapel. Architecturally, the chapel features a high entryway porch, pointed arch windows, and an interior ceiling supported by exposed timber trusses. The chapel building was independently listed on the National Register of Historic Places on January 3, 1994, the same day the main Methodist sanctuary received its designation.
