= Kissimmee Gateway Airport =

Airport in Florida, U.S.

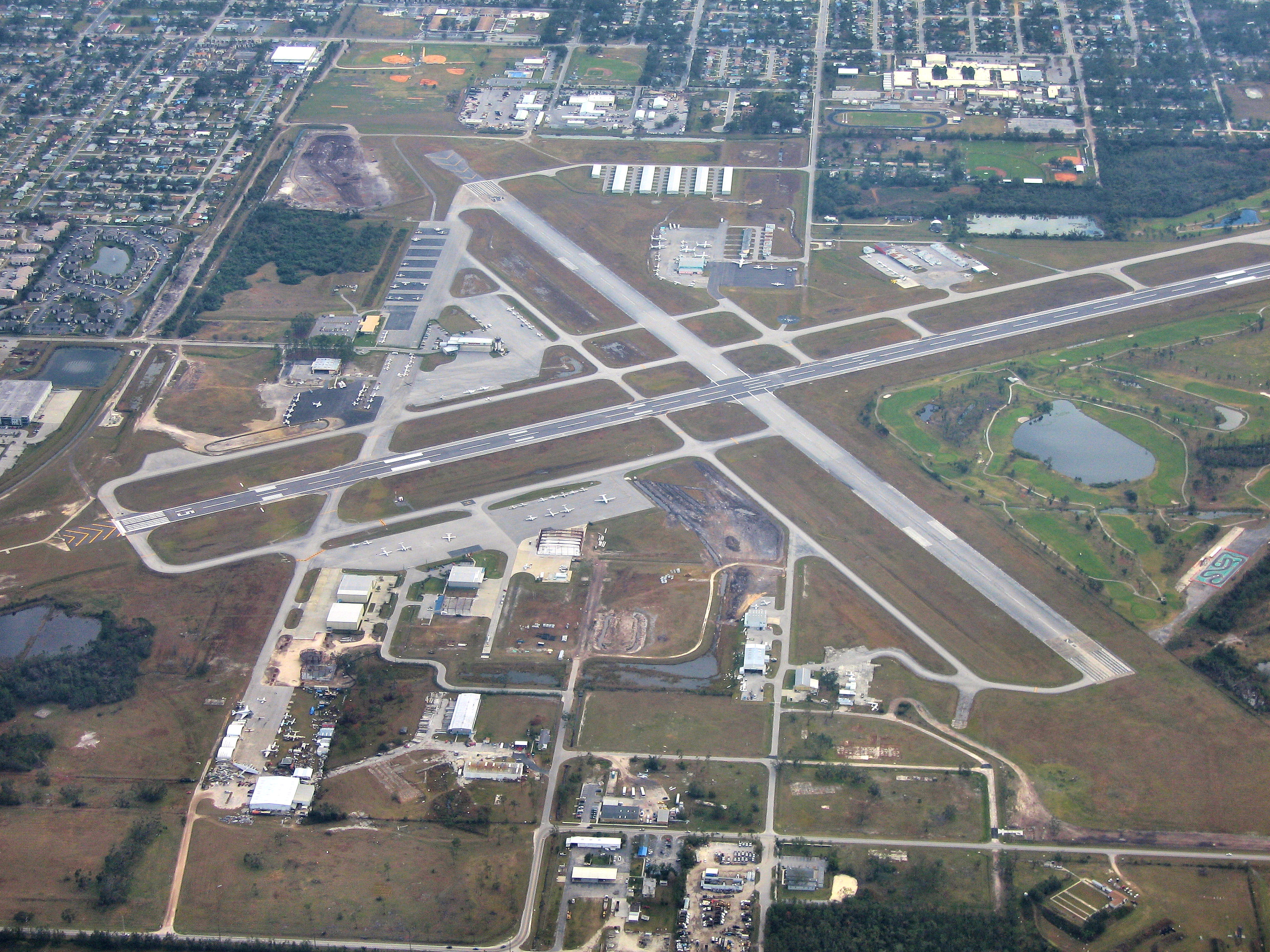
- Aerial view of Kissimmee Gateway Airport
- IATA: ISM; ICAO: KISM; FAA LID: ISM

Summary
- Airport type: Public
- Owner/Operator: City of Kissimmee
- Serves: Greater Orlando
- Location: Kissimmee, Florida
- Elevation AMSL: 82 ft (25 m)
- Coordinates: 28°17′23″N 081°26′14″W
- Website: flykissimmee.com

Map
- Location of airport in Florida ISM (the United States)

Runways
| Direction | Length | | Surface |
| Direction | ft | m | Surface |
|---|---|---|---|
| 6/24 | 5,001 | 1,524 | Asphalt |
| 15/33 | 6,001 | 1,829 | Asphalt |

Statistics (2018)
- Aircraft operations (year ending 8/16/2018): 150,388
- Based aircraft: 412
- Sources: Airport website and FAA

Kissimmee Gateway Airport (IATA: ISM, ICAO: KISM, FAA LID: ISM), formerly known as Kissimmee Municipal Airport, is a public airport in Kissimmee, a city in Osceola County, Florida, United States. The airport is located 16 nautical miles (30 km) southwest of the central business district of Orlando. It is owned and operated by the City of Kissimmee.

The airport does not offer scheduled passenger service. DayJet formerly provided "on-demand" service to 12 cities, but suspended all operations in September 2008.

== Facilities and aircraft ==
Kissimmee Gateway Airport covers an area of 892 acres (361 ha) which contains two asphalt paved runways: 6/24 measuring 5,001 x 150 ft (1,524 x 46 m) and 15/33 measuring 6,001 x 100 ft (1,829 x 30 m). Today it hosts a variety of general aviation aircraft operations, including a major facility for the restoration of classic military aircraft from the World War II era to flying condition. The airport has an operational control tower and a Category I instrument landing system (ILS) on its main runway. It is considered a general aviation reliever airport to Orlando International Airport.

For the 12-month period ending August 16, 2018, the airport had 150,388 aircraft operations, an average of 412 per day: 98% general aviation, 2% air taxi, <1% military and <1% scheduled commercial. There was at that time 240 aircraft based at this airport: 175 single-engine, 26 multi-engine, 19 jet, 19 helicopter, and 1 glider.

== History ==
For the World War II use of the airport, see: Kissimmee Army Airfield

The airport opened in April 1940 by the United States Army Air Forces. Known as Kissimmee Army Airfield, it was used as part of the Air University Army Air Forces School of Applied Tactics (AAFSAT) tactical combat simulation school in Central and Northern Florida. Training was moved to southern California in January 1944, and the military use of the field was phased down. The airfield was closed on 7 July 1945 and returned to civilian use by the end of the year.

At some point in the late 1970s, it also received service on Air Sunshine to Miami and Tampa.

== See also ==
- List of airports in Florida
