= Old Holy Redeemer Catholic Church =

Historic church in Florida, United States

- U.S. National Register of Historic Places
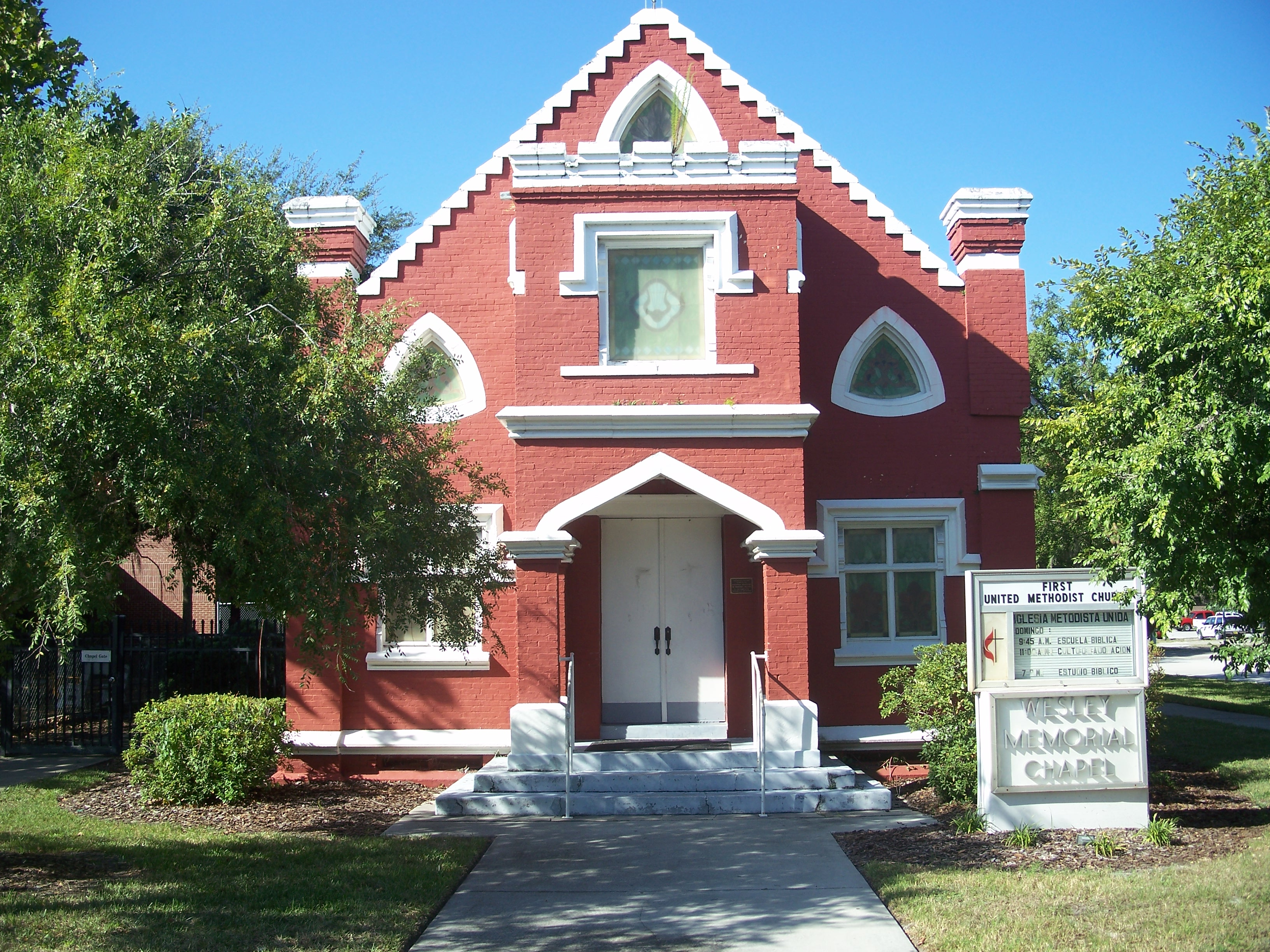

- Location within Florida Location within the United States
- Location: Kissimmee, Florida
- Coordinates: 28°17′45″N 81°24′24″W
- Architectural style: Late Gothic Revival
- NRHP reference No.: 93001456
- Added to NRHP: January 3, 1994

The Old Holy Redeemer Catholic Church is a historic site in Kissimmee, Florida. It is located at 120 North Sproule Avenue. On January 3, 1994, it was added to the U.S. National Register of Historic Places.

This church had its early services in the home of Mrs. A. Tress, above the Tress Store on Broadway. It was once a mission of Orlando's St. James Catholic Church. On May 5, 1912, they laid the cornerstone of a little brick church at 122 W. Sproule Ave., and celebrated their first mass there on June 30, 1912. It cost $7,000, and initially had no pews and no electricity. In 1972, they sold the building for $85,000 to the First United Methodist Church. A new church was built on a nearby site in west Kissimmee at 1603 N Thacker Avenue.
