= Colonial Estate =

Historic house in Florida, United States

- U.S. National Register of Historic Places
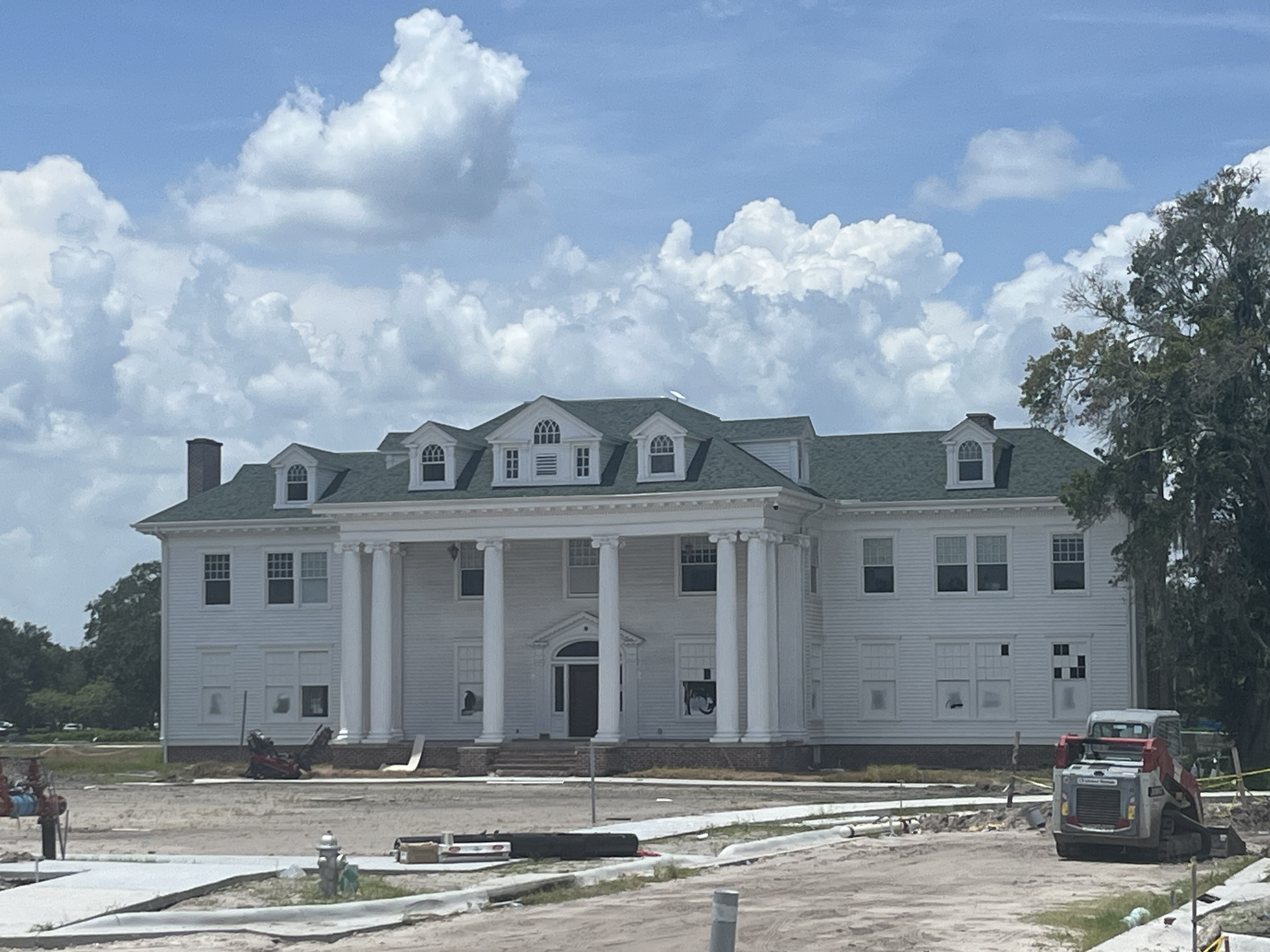

- Location within Florida Location within the United States
- Location: Kissimmee, Florida
- Coordinates: 28°18′59″N 81°24′13″W
- Architect: Henry Green
- Architectural style: Classical Revival
- NRHP reference No.: 93001455
- Added to NRHP: January 3, 1994

The Colonial Estate (also known as the Tucker/Ivey House) is a historic site in Kissimmee, Florida. It is located at 2450 Old Dixie Highway. On January 3, 1994, it was added to the U.S. National Register of Historic Places.

This home was built c. 1916 by J. Wade Tucker, a lumber baron from Georgia. It was later purchased in the 1930s by Hilda and Lester Ivey and is still owned today by this family.
