= Kissimmee, Florida =

City in Florida, United States

- City
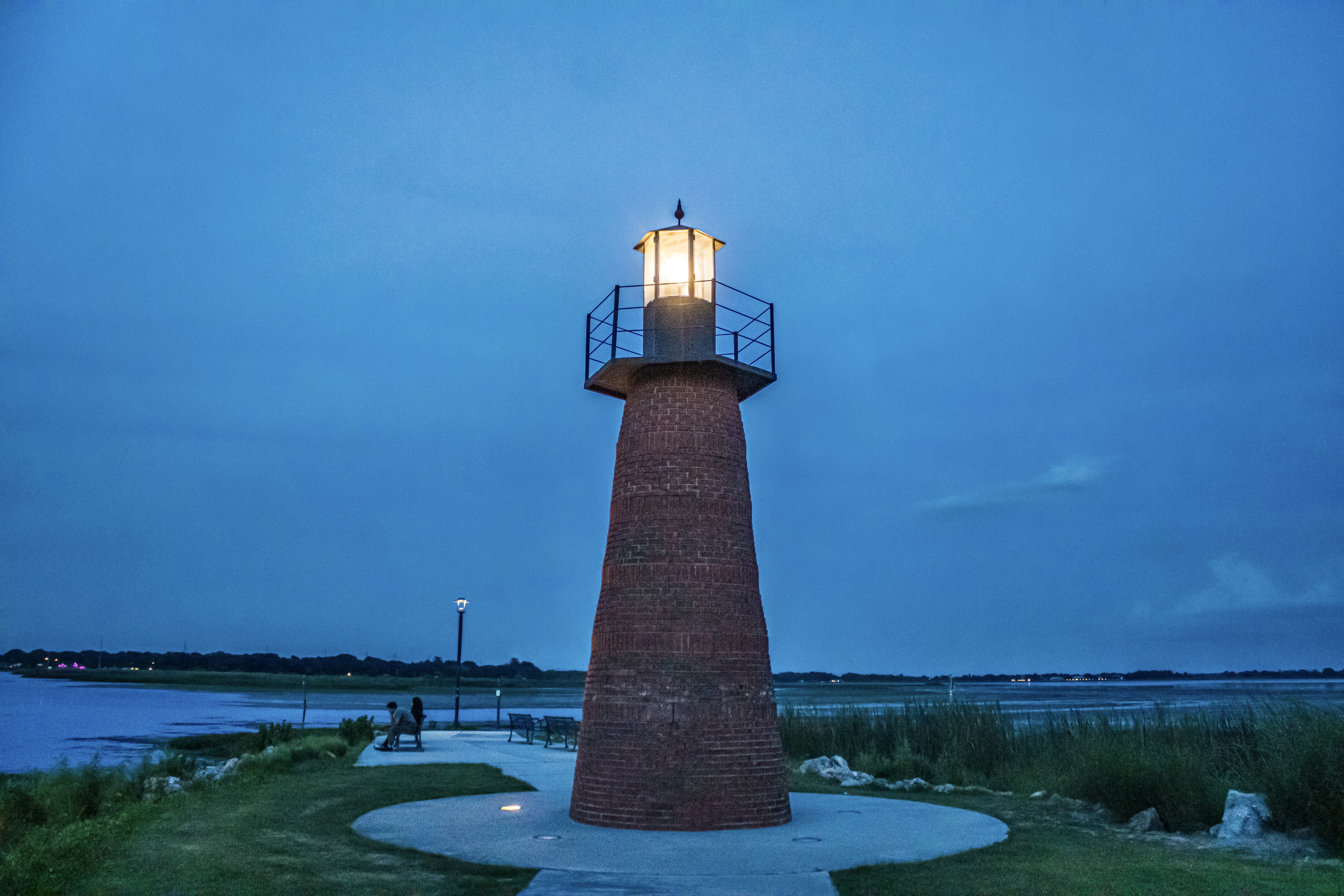
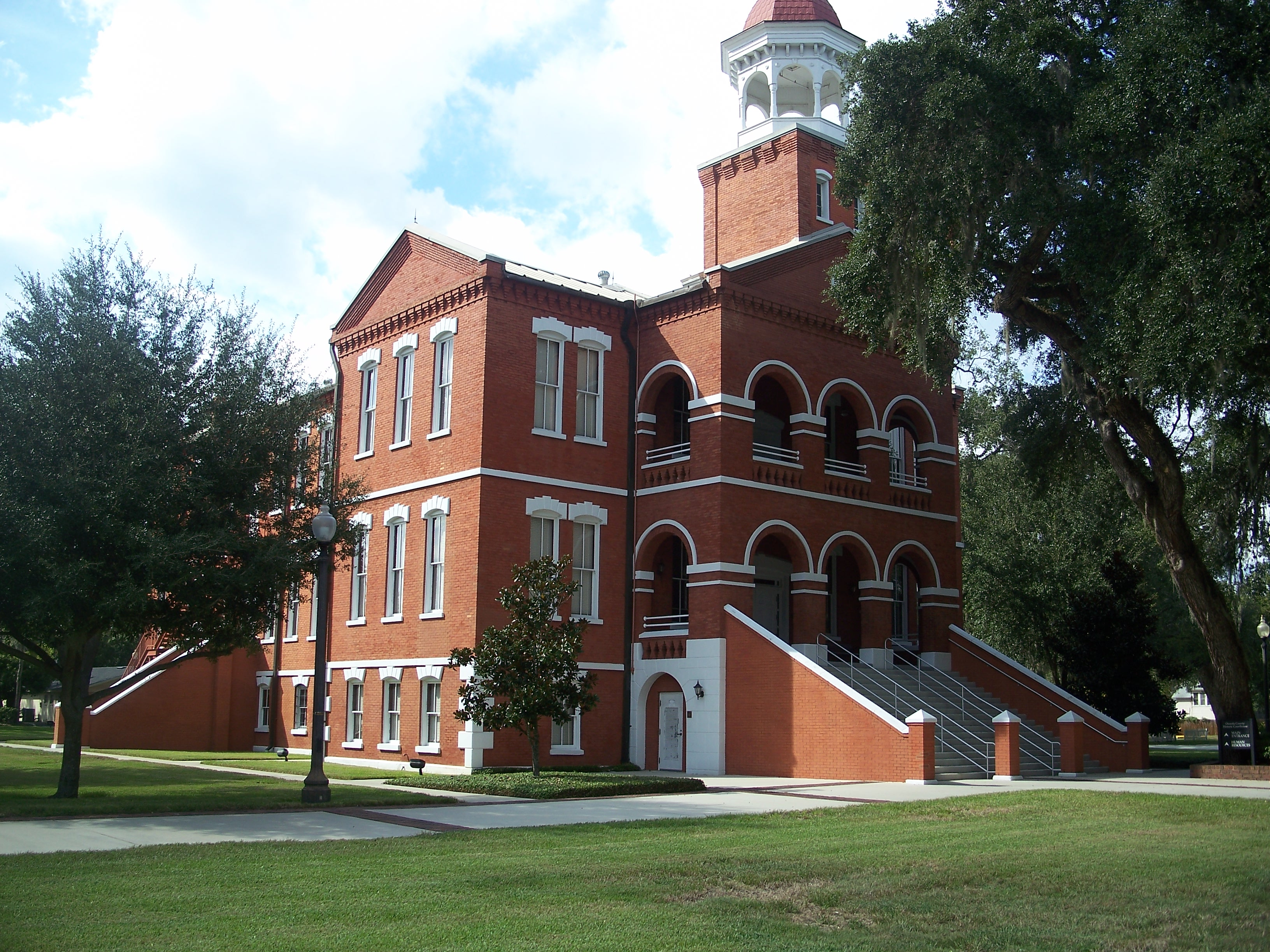
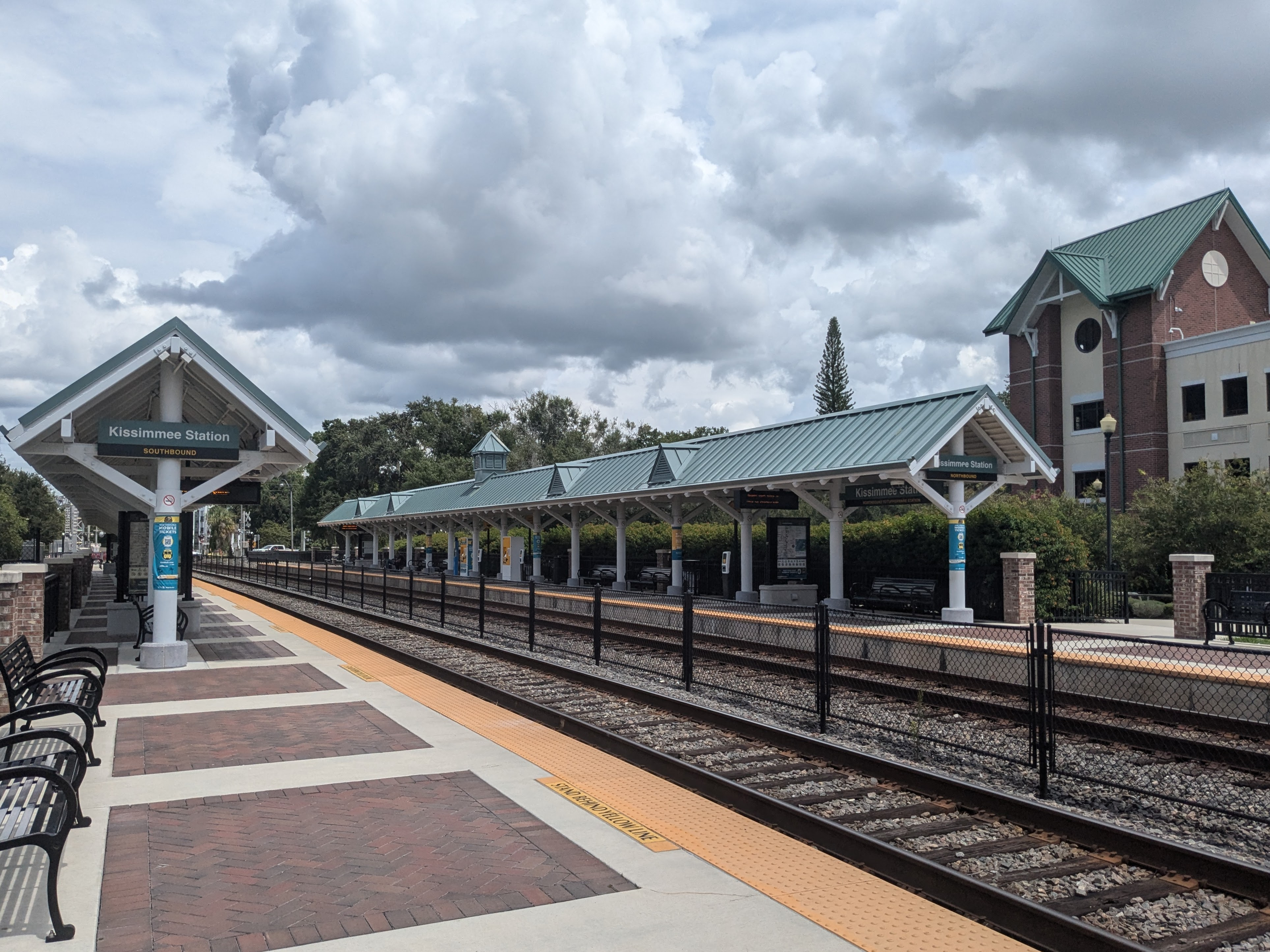
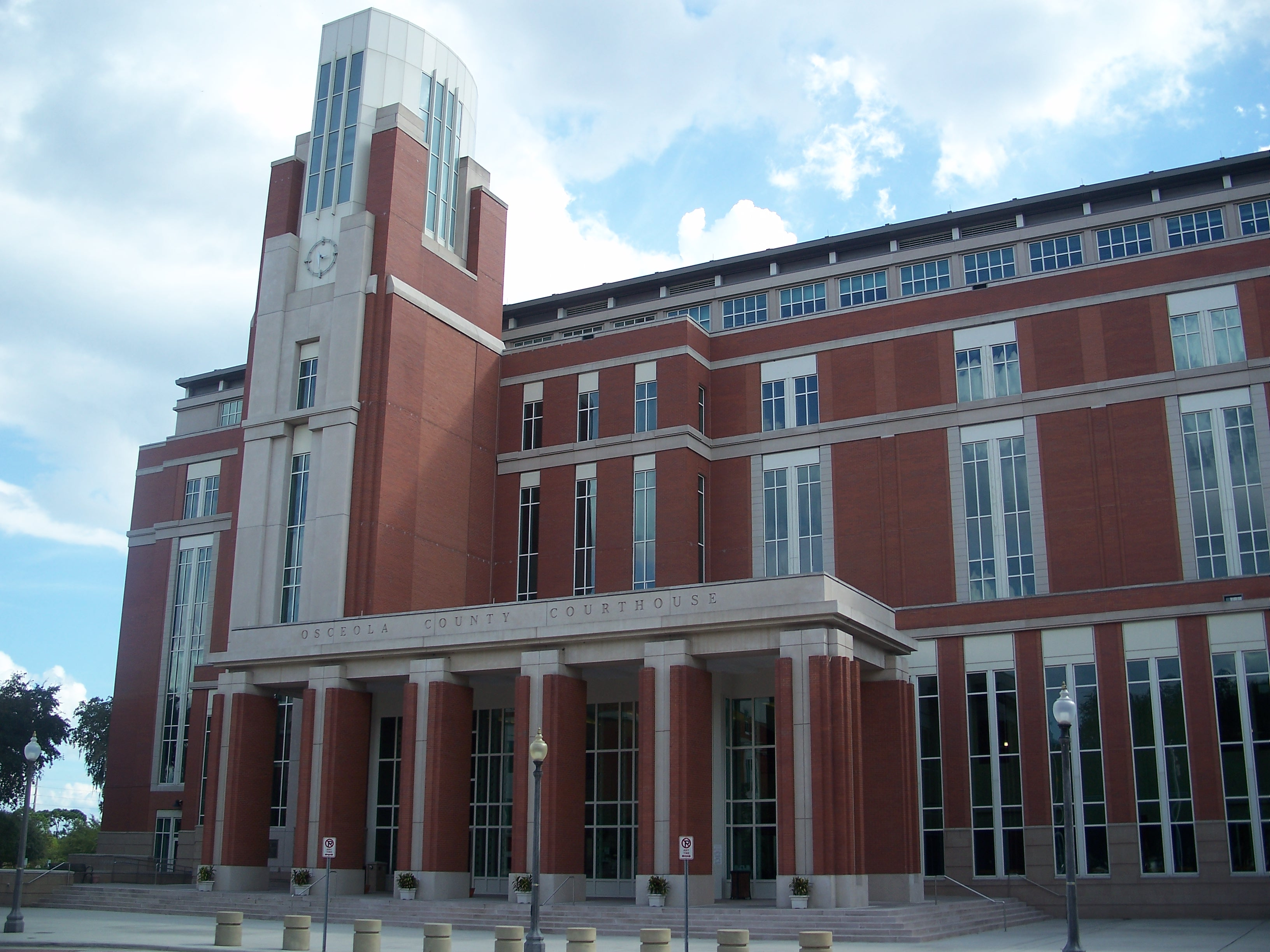
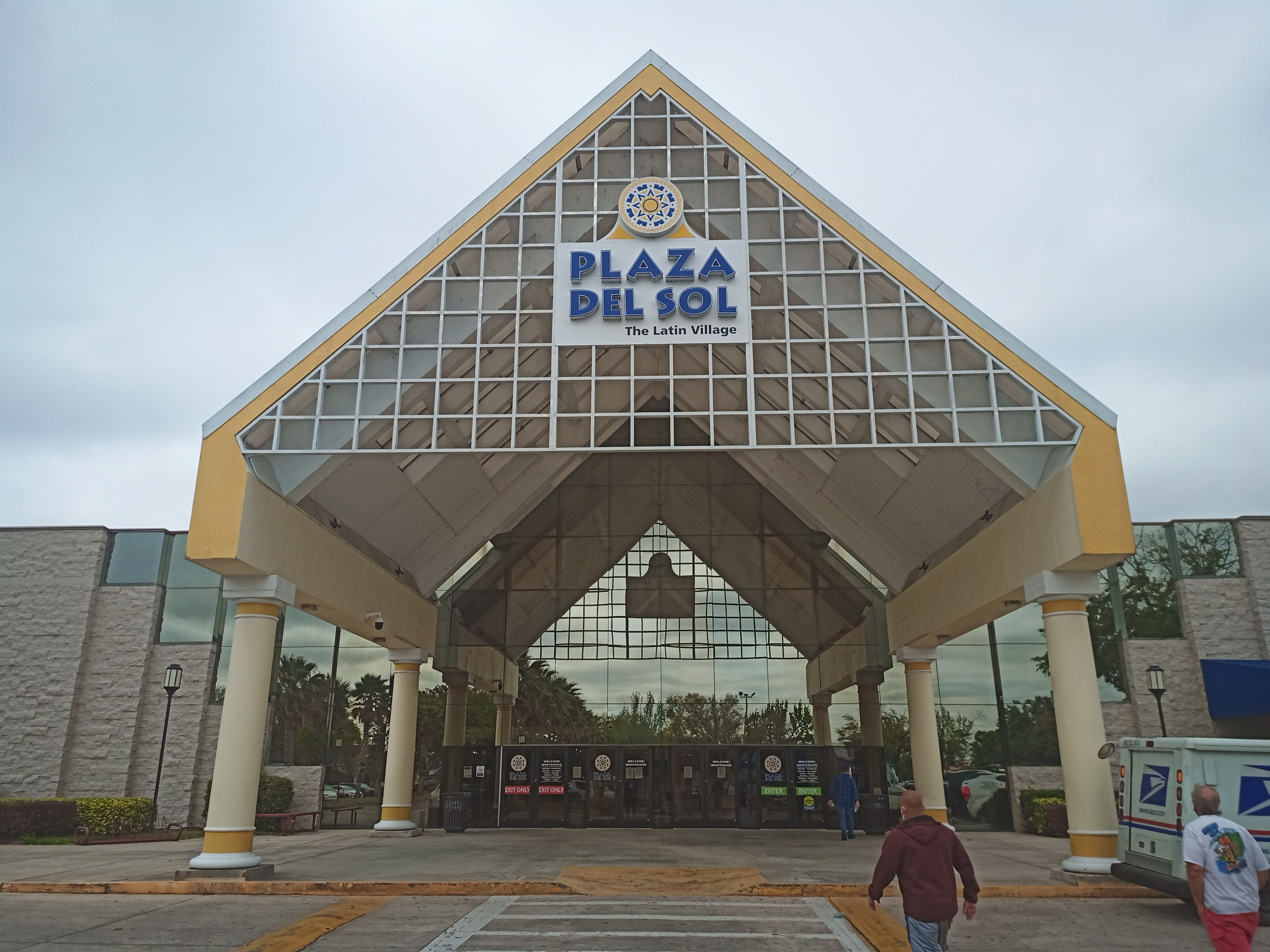
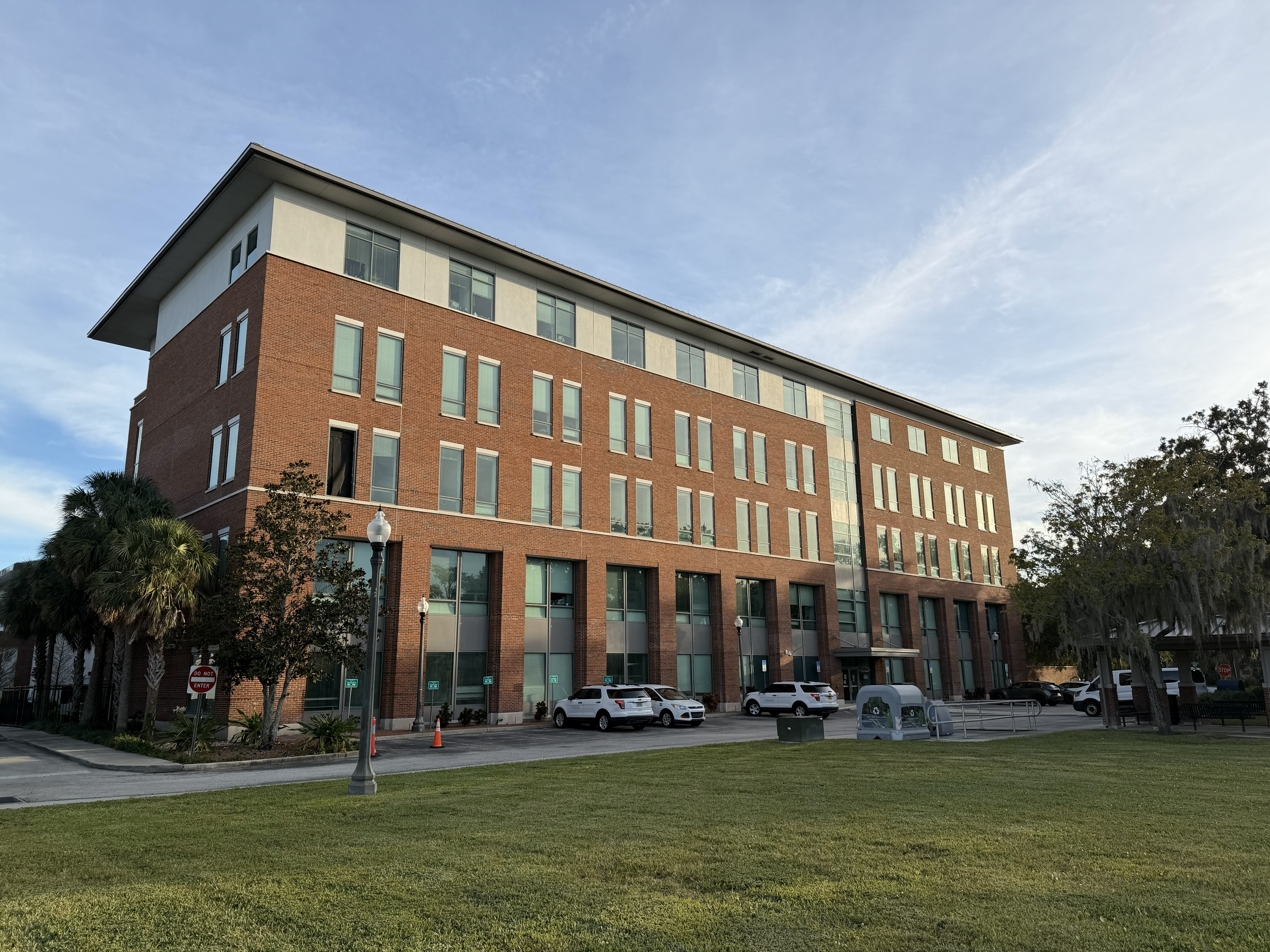
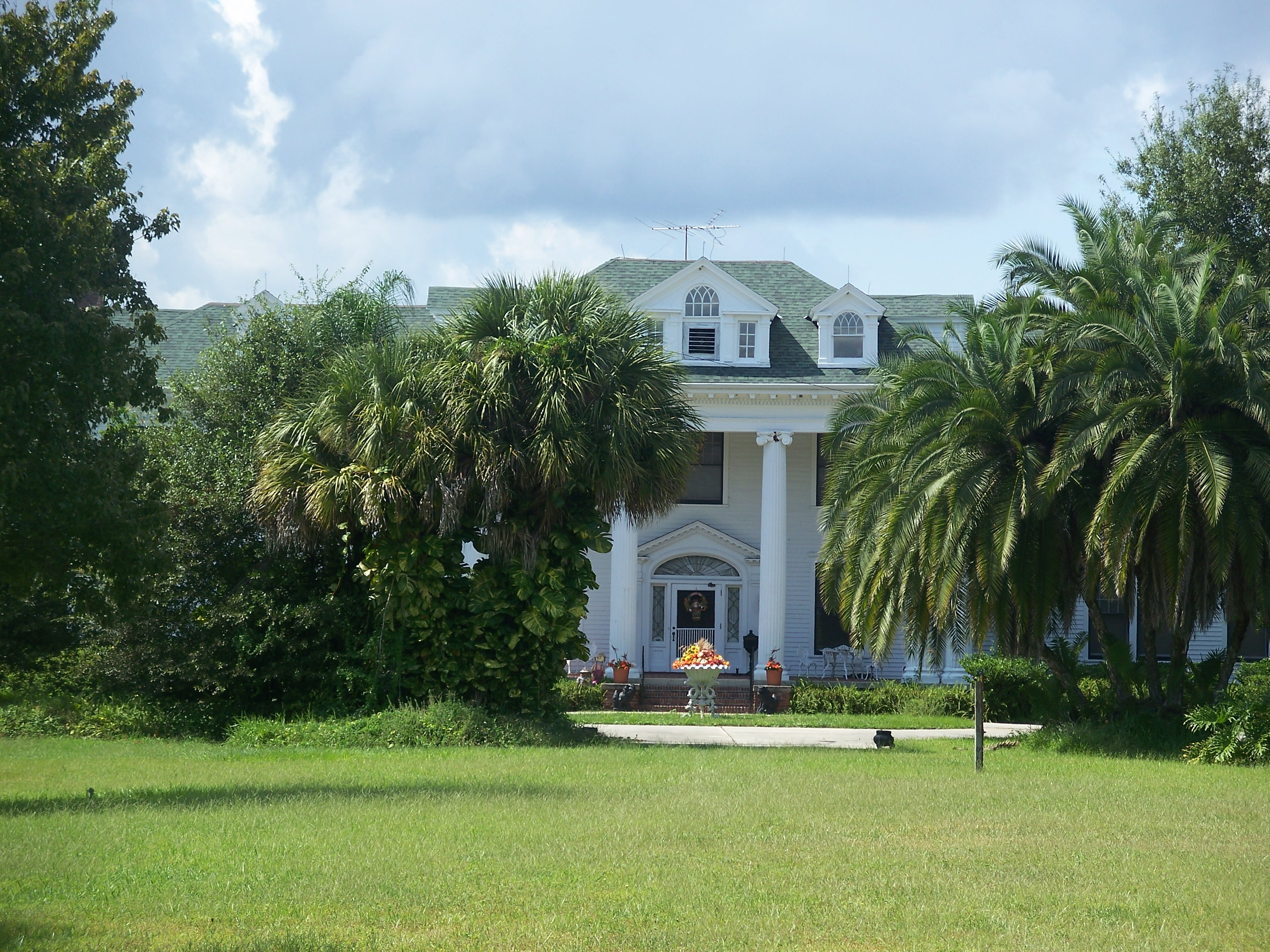
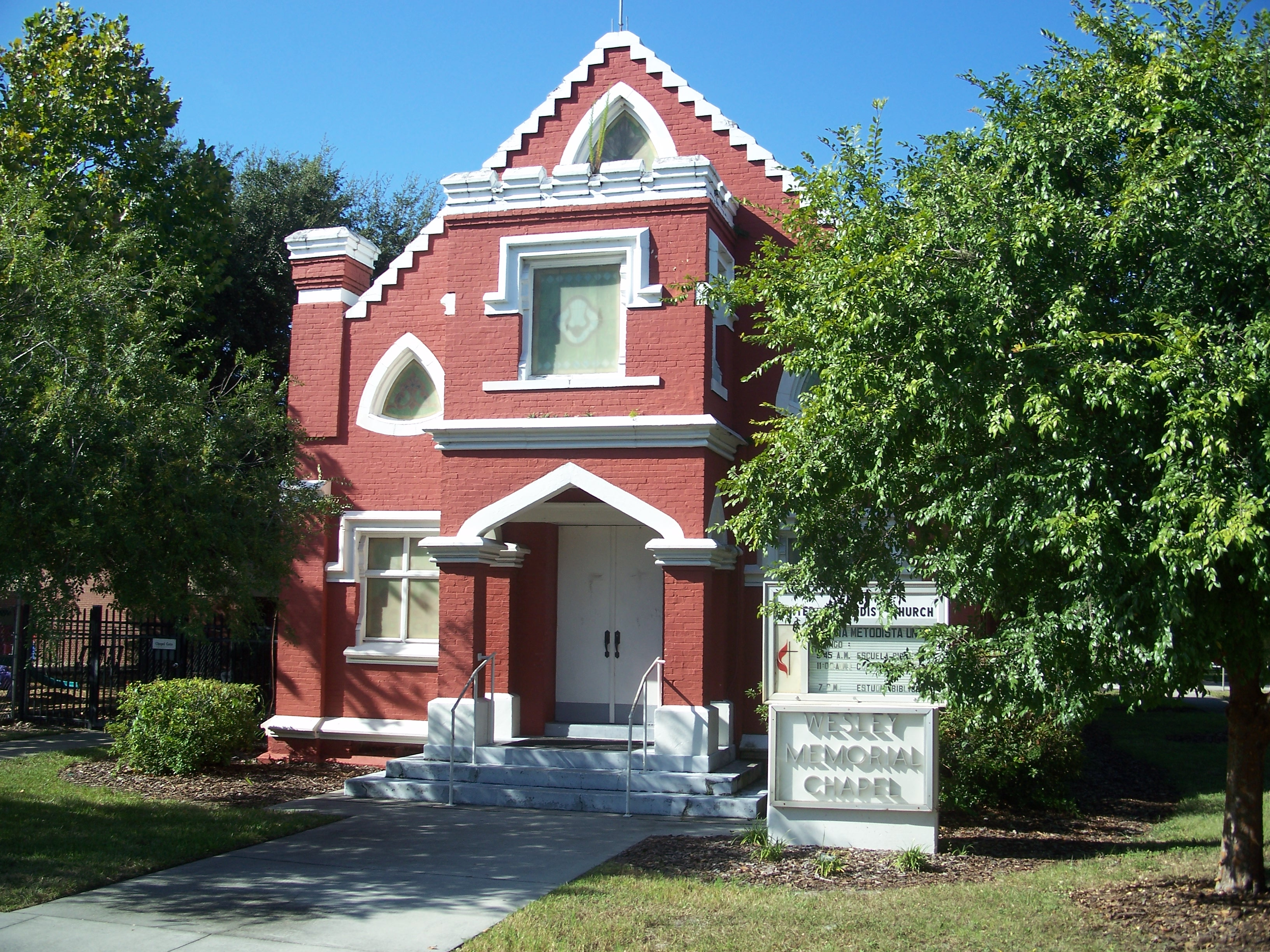
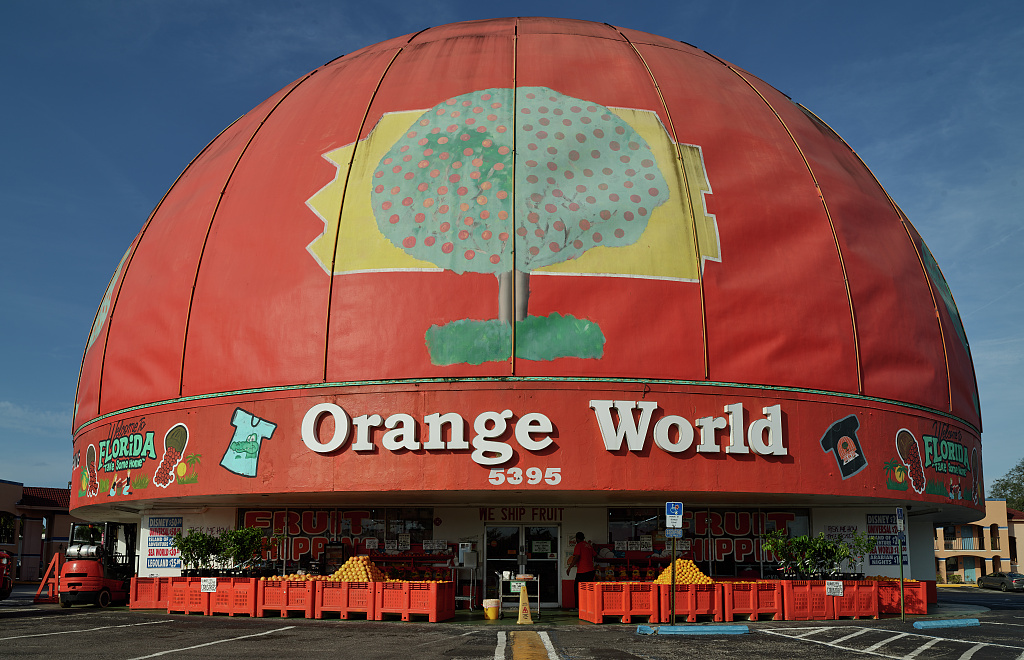
- Kissimmee Lighthouse Old Osceola County Courthouse Kissimmee station New Osceola County Courthouse Plaza del Sol Kissimmee City Hall Colonial Estate Old Holy Redeemer Catholic Church Orange World

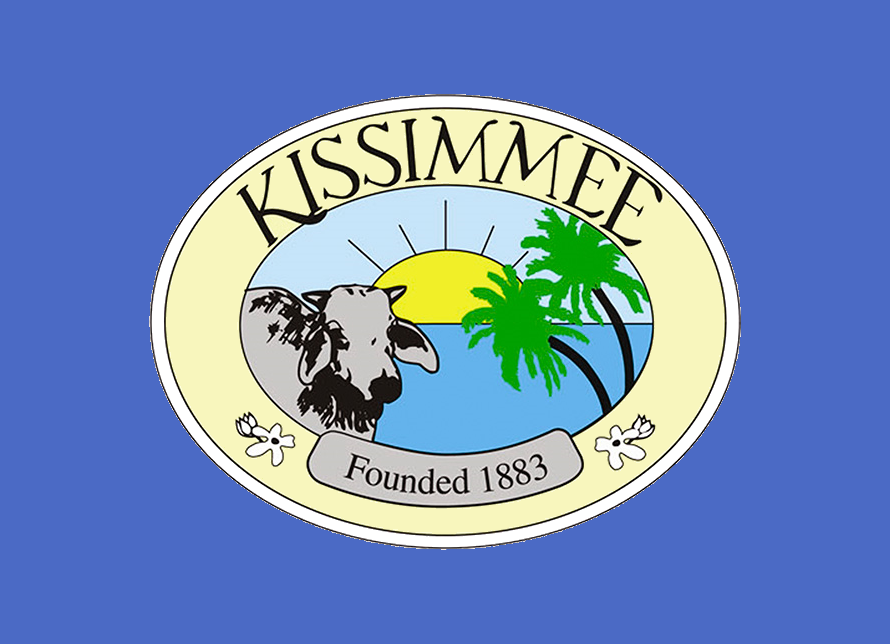
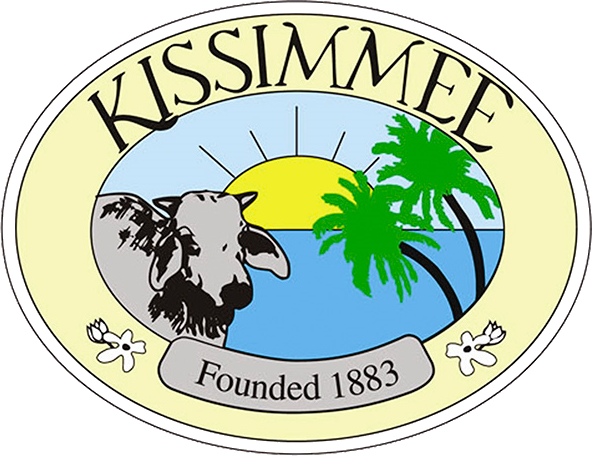
- Flag Seal
- Nicknames: The K, K-Town, Kowtown
- Motto: "In God We Trust"
- Interactive map of Kissimmee, Florida
- Location within Florida Location within the United States Location within North America
- Coordinates: 28°18′15″N 81°24′46″W
- Country: United States
- State: Florida
- County: Osceola
- Incorporated: 1883

Government
  - Type: Commission-Manager
  - Mayor: Angela Eady
  - Vice Mayor: Olga Lucia Castaño
  - Commissioners: Janette Martinez, Carlos Alvarez III, and Mayor Pro Tem Angela Eady
  - City Manager: Mike Steigerwald
  - City Clerk: Tameara Crespo

Area
  - City: 22.20 sq mi (57.50 km^{2})
  - Land: 21.50 sq mi (55.69 km^{2})
  - Water: 0.70 sq mi (1.81 km^{2}) 3.7%
- Elevation: 72 ft (22 m)

Population (2020)
  - City: 79,226
  - Estimate (2025) ▲: 85,591
  - Density: 3,684.7/sq mi (1,422.67/km^{2})
  - Urban: 418,404 (US: 100th)
  - Urban density: 2,589/sq mi (999.8/km^{2})
  - Metro: 2,673,376 (US: 23rd)
- Time zone: UTC-5 (Eastern (EST))
  - Summer (DST): UTC-4 (EDT)
- ZIP codes: 34741-34747, 34758-34759
- Area codes: 321, 407, 689
- FIPS code: 12-36950
- GNIS feature ID: 2404839
- Website: www.kissimmee.gov

Kissimmee (/kɪ.ˈsɪm.i/, kih-SIM-ee) is the largest city and county seat of Osceola County, Florida, United States. As of the 2020 census, the population was 79,226. It is a principal city of the Orlando-Kissimmee-Sanford, Florida, Metropolitan Statistical Area. The Census Bureau defines an urban area with Kissimmee as the principal city, which is separated from the Orlando urban area. The Kissimmee–St. Cloud, Florida urban area had a 2020 population of 418,404, making it the 100th largest in the United States.

== History ==
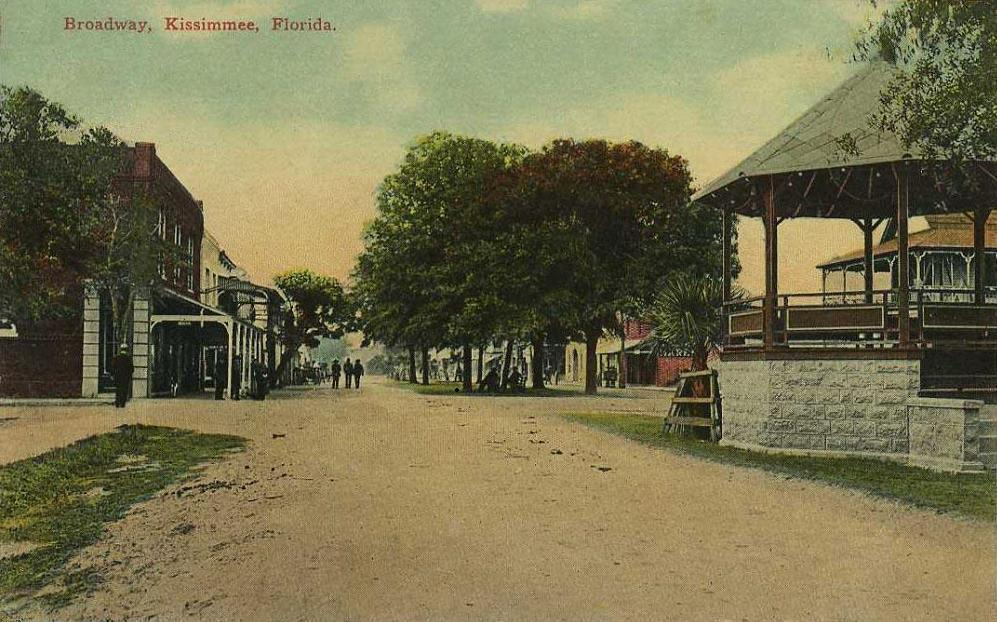
Broadway Avenue c. 1912

The area was originally named Allendale after Confederate Major J. H. Allen, who operated the first cargo steamboat along the Kissimmee River, the Mary Belle. It was renamed Kissimmee when it was incorporated as a city in 1883. The modern town, the county seat of Osceola County, was founded before the Civil War by the Bass, Johnson and Overstreet families. The etymology of the name Kissimmee is debated, apart from general agreement that it is Native American in origin. Its growth can be credited to Hamilton Disston of Philadelphia, who based his four-million acre (8,000 km^{2}) drainage operation out of the town. Disston had contracted with the financially wobbly state of Florida to drain its southern lands, for which he would own half of all he successfully drained. This deal made Disston the largest single landowner in the United States.

Disston's dredging and land speculation required a small steamboat industry to transport people and goods along the new waterway. The Kissimmee shipyard was responsible for building most of these large steamships, which were just one jump ahead of civilization—with Kissimmee as the jumping off point. Concurrently, the South Florida Railroad was growing and extended the end of its line from Sanford down to Kissimmee, making the town on Lake Tohopekaliga a transportation hub for Central Florida. On February 12, 1885, the Florida Legislature incorporated the Kissimmee City Street Railway.

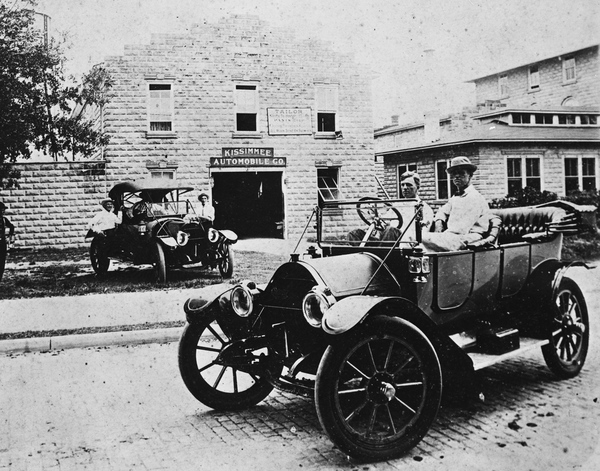
Kissimmee Automobile Company, 1910s

Kissimmee's heyday was short-lived. Expanding railroads began to challenge the steamships for carrying freight and passengers. By 1884, the South Florida Railroad, now part of the Plant System, had extended its tracks to Tampa. The Panic of 1893 was the worst depression the U.S. had experienced up to that time, crushing land speculation and unsound debt. Disston closed his Kissimmee land operation. Consecutive freezes in 1894 and 1895 wiped out the citrus industry. The freezes, combined with South Florida's growth and the relocation of steamship operations to Lake Okeechobee, left Kissimmee dependent on open range cattle ranching.

Kissimmee had a population of 4,310 in 1950. At that point, there was some citrus packing as well as ranching.

Ranching remained an important part of the local economy until Walt Disney World opened nearby in 1971. Tourism and development soon supplanted cattle ranching by a large measure. Even though the Disney facility took over much of the open range cattle lands, cattle ranches still operate nearby, particularly in southern Osceola County.

The 1998 Central Florida tornado outbreak killed dozens of people in the area. On August 13, 2004, Hurricane Charley passed through Kissimmee with winds in excess of 100 miles per hour (160 km/h), damaging homes and buildings, toppling trees and cutting electrical power to the entire city. Kissimmee Utility Authority restored power to 54 percent of the residents in the first 72 hours and to 85 percent within one week. Service was restored to all customers on August 28. Three weeks after Hurricane Charley, the area was struck by Hurricane Frances, then Hurricane Jeanne three weeks later.

== Geography ==
According to the United States Census Bureau, the city has an area of 17.32 square miles (44.9 km^{2}), of which 16.7 square miles (43 km^{2}) is land and 0.6 square miles (2 km^{2}), comprising 3.7%, is water. Kissimmee and St. Cloud are the county's only incorporated settlements. They are in proximity to each other along U.S. Highways 192 and 441.

A large geographical area of unincorporated Osceola County is also referred to as Kissimmee. This includes most of the 192 corridor west of the city border to Highway 27, areas north of the city to Hunters Creek, and areas south of the city to Poinciana.

=== City water resources ===
Drained by the Kissimmee River, the city is on the northwest shore of Lake Tohopekaliga (locally called Lake Toho, West Lake Toho, or simply West Lake) in central Florida. Shingle Creek, largely considered the headwaters of the Everglades, also runs through the city, and features a canoe/kayak trail that runs from Steffe Landing on US 192 and ends in Lake Tohopekaliga.

=== Downtown ===
The downtown area lies near the intersection of U.S. Highway 17/92 and U.S. Highway 192. Downtown Kissimmee has no skyscrapers; most of the buildings are two or three stories high. The biggest and the tallest building downtown is the Osceola County courthouse. The main thoroughfare follows Highway 17/Highway 92 through the city's center and is a combination of three streets: Main Street, Broadway Street, and Emmett Street. The downtown area consists largely of restaurants, small shops, and historic residences. The University of Central Florida has a business incubator in the area that is an important part of the economic engine downtown.

=== Climate ===
The climate in this area is characterized by hot, humid summers and generally mild, dry, and sunny winters. According to the Köppen climate classification system, Kissimmee has a humid subtropical climate (Cfa).

Climate data for Kissimmee, Florida, 1991–2020 normals, extremes 1959–present
Month	Jan	Feb	Mar	Apr	May	Jun	Jul	Aug	Sep	Oct	Nov	Dec	Year
Record high °F (°C)	90 (32)	90 (32)	92 (33)	97 (36)	100 (38)	101 (38)	101 (38)	103 (39)	98 (37)	97 (36)	92 (33)	90 (32)	103 (39)
Mean maximum °F (°C)	82.9 (28.3)	84.9 (29.4)	87.4 (30.8)	90.3 (32.4)	93.9 (34.4)	95.5 (35.3)	95.5 (35.3)	95.3 (35.2)	94.0 (34.4)	91.2 (32.9)	86.7 (30.4)	83.6 (28.7)	96.6 (35.9)
Mean daily maximum °F (°C)	71.8 (22.1)	74.4 (23.6)	77.9 (25.5)	83.0 (28.3)	87.4 (30.8)	90.0 (32.2)	91.5 (33.1)	91.4 (33.0)	89.5 (31.9)	84.6 (29.2)	78.6 (25.9)	73.5 (23.1)	82.8 (28.2)
Daily mean °F (°C)	60.1 (15.6)	62.6 (17.0)	66.1 (18.9)	71.4 (21.9)	76.6 (24.8)	80.9 (27.2)	82.5 (28.1)	82.7 (28.2)	81.1 (27.3)	75.4 (24.1)	67.9 (19.9)	62.5 (16.9)	72.5 (22.5)
Mean daily minimum °F (°C)	48.3 (9.1)	50.7 (10.4)	54.4 (12.4)	59.7 (15.4)	65.8 (18.8)	71.8 (22.1)	73.5 (23.1)	74.1 (23.4)	72.8 (22.7)	66.2 (19.0)	57.3 (14.1)	51.5 (10.8)	62.2 (16.8)
Mean minimum °F (°C)	32.7 (0.4)	35.4 (1.9)	40.0 (4.4)	46.9 (8.3)	55.8 (13.2)	66.8 (19.3)	69.9 (21.1)	70.6 (21.4)	67.0 (19.4)	52.4 (11.3)	42.9 (6.1)	36.7 (2.6)	30.6 (−0.8)
Record low °F (°C)	19 (−7)	27 (−3)	25 (−4)	38 (3)	41 (5)	53 (12)	58 (14)	60 (16)	56 (13)	40 (4)	29 (−2)	20 (−7)	19 (−7)
Average precipitation inches (mm)	2.67 (68)	2.37 (60)	3.07 (78)	2.43 (62)	4.17 (106)	9.18 (233)	7.21 (183)	8.38 (213)	5.88 (149)	3.07 (78)	1.99 (51)	2.15 (55)	52.57 (1,335)
Average precipitation days (≥ 0.01 in)	7.6	6.5	6.2	5.7	7.8	15.8	16.7	17.7	14.3	8.7	5.8	6.5	119.3
Source: NOAA

== Demographics ==
Historical population
Census	Pop.	Note	%±
1890	1,086		—
1900	1,132		4.2%
1910	2,157		90.5%
1920	2,722		26.2%
1930	3,163		16.2%
1940	3,225		2.0%
1950	4,310		33.6%
1960	6,845		58.8%
1970	7,119		4.0%
1980	15,487		117.5%
1990	30,050		94.0%
2000	47,814		59.1%
2010	59,682		24.8%
2020	79,226		32.7%
2025 (est.)	85,591	▲	8.0%
U.S. Decennial Census

=== Racial and ethnic composition ===
Kissimmee racial composition (Hispanics excluded from racial categories) (NH = Non-Hispanic)
Race	Pop 2010	Pop 2020	% 2010	% 2020
White (NH)	15,633	13,244	26.19%	16.72%
Black or African American (NH)	5,725	7,061	9.59%	8.91%
Native American or Alaska Native (NH)	125	90	0.21%	0.11%
Asian (NH)	1,925	2,803	3.23%	3.54%
Pacific Islander or Native Hawaiian (NH)	44	33	0.07%	0.04%
Some other race (NH)	213	827	0.36%	1.04%
Two or more races/multiracial (NH)	847	1,995	1.42%	2.52%
Hispanic or Latino (any race)	35,170	53,173	58.93%	67.12%
Total	59,682	79,226	100.00%	100.00%

=== 2020 census ===
As of the 2020 census, Kissimmee had a population of 79,226. The median age was 36.2 years. 23.7% of residents were under the age of 18 and 12.5% of residents were 65 years of age or older. For every 100 females there were 92.2 males, and for every 100 females age 18 and over there were 88.3 males age 18 and over.

100.0% of residents lived in urban areas, while 0.0% lived in rural areas.

There were 26,861 households in Kissimmee, of which 39.9% had children under the age of 18 living in them. Of all households, 44.5% were married-couple households, 16.3% were households with a male householder and no spouse or partner present, and 30.4% were households with a female householder and no spouse or partner present. About 18.5% of all households were made up of individuals and 6.2% had someone living alone who was 65 years of age or older.

There were 30,370 housing units, of which 11.6% were vacant. The homeowner vacancy rate was 2.5% and the rental vacancy rate was 9.2%.

Racial composition as of the 2020 census
Race	Number	Percent
White	23,518	29.7%
Black or African American	8,415	10.6%
American Indian and Alaska Native	560	0.7%
Asian	2,888	3.6%
Native Hawaiian and Other Pacific Islander	53	0.1%
Some other race	21,122	26.7%
Two or more races	22,670	28.6%
Hispanic or Latino (of any race)	53,173	67.1%

=== 2010 census ===
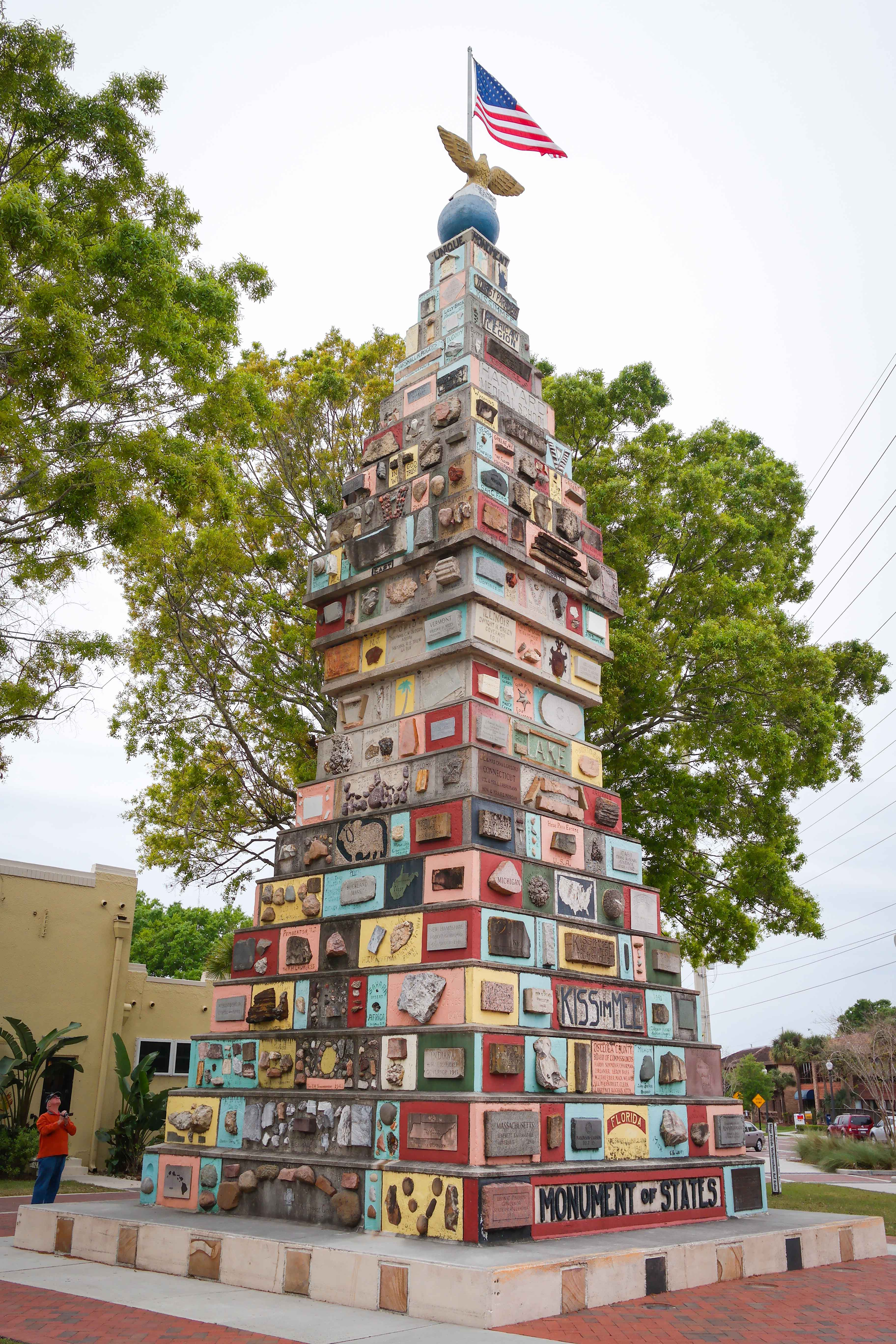
Monument of States

As of the 2010 United States census, there were 59,682 people, 22,040 households, and 15,812 families residing in the city.

Out of Kissimmee's 58.93% Hispanic or Latino residents in the 2010 US census, 33.1% were Puerto Rican, 5.1% Dominican, 4.0% Colombian, 3.9% Mexican, 2.6% Cuban, 1.4% Venezuelan, 0.9% Ecuadorian, 0.7% Salvadoran, 0.7% Peruvian, 0.6% Honduran, and 0.6% were Nicaraguan. Also in 2010, out of the 9.59% non-Hispanic African American or Black residents, there was an additional 2.8% of people who were Afro-Latino or Black Hispanic. The 2010 census also showed that from the 3.23% Asians living in Kissimmee, 1.1% were Indian and 0.8% were Filipino.

=== 2000 census ===
As of the 2000 census, there were 47,814 people, 17,121 households, and 11,813 families residing in the city. The population density was 2,866.6 inhabitants per square mile (1,106.8/km^{2}). There were 19,642 housing units at an average density of 1,177.6 per square mile (454.7/km^{2}). The racial makeup of the city was 67.22% White, 9.99% African American, 0.52% Native American, 3.38% Asian, 0.10% Pacific Islander, 14.15% from other races, and 4.66% from two or more races. Hispanic or Latino people of any race were 41.73% of the population. The majority of Hispanics residing in the city are Puerto Ricans. There are also small Colombian, Cuban and Dominican communities residing in and/or around the city.

In 2000, there were 17,121 households, out of which 37.4% had children under the age of 18 living with them, 47.2% were married couples living together, 15.8% had a female householder with no husband present, and 31.0% were non-families. 20.9% of all households were made up of individuals, and 4.9% had someone living alone who was 65 years of age or older. The average household size was 2.77 and the average family size was 3.21.

In 2000, in the city, the population was spread out, with 27.0% under the age of 18, 12.0% from 18 to 24, 34.9% from 25 to 44, 18.5% from 45 to 64, and 7.6% who were 65 years of age or older. The median age was 31 years. For every 100 females, there were 98.1 males. For every 100 females age 18 and over, there were 95.8 males.

As of 2000, the median income for a household in the city was $33,949, and the median income for a family was $36,361. Males had a median income of $25,851 versus $21,025 for females. The per capita income for the city was $15,071. About 12.3% of families and 15.4% of the population were below the poverty line, including 19.0% of those under age 18 and 10.2% of those age 65 or over.

== Economy ==
Multinational multi-level marketing company Tupperware Brands is based in Kissimmee.

=== Top employers ===
According to Kissimmee's 2023 Annual Comprehensive Financial Report, the city's top employers were:

#	Employer	# of employees
1	School District of Osceola County, Florida	7,300
2	Adventist Health System	3,565
3	Disney Destinations	3,419
4	Publix Supermarkets	1,795
5	Osceola County Government	1,700
6	HCA Healthcare	1,593
7	Buena Vista Construction	1,296
8	McLane/Suneast	1,270
9	Lowe's Distribution Center	1,035
10	Jr. Davis Construction Company	928

== Arts and culture ==
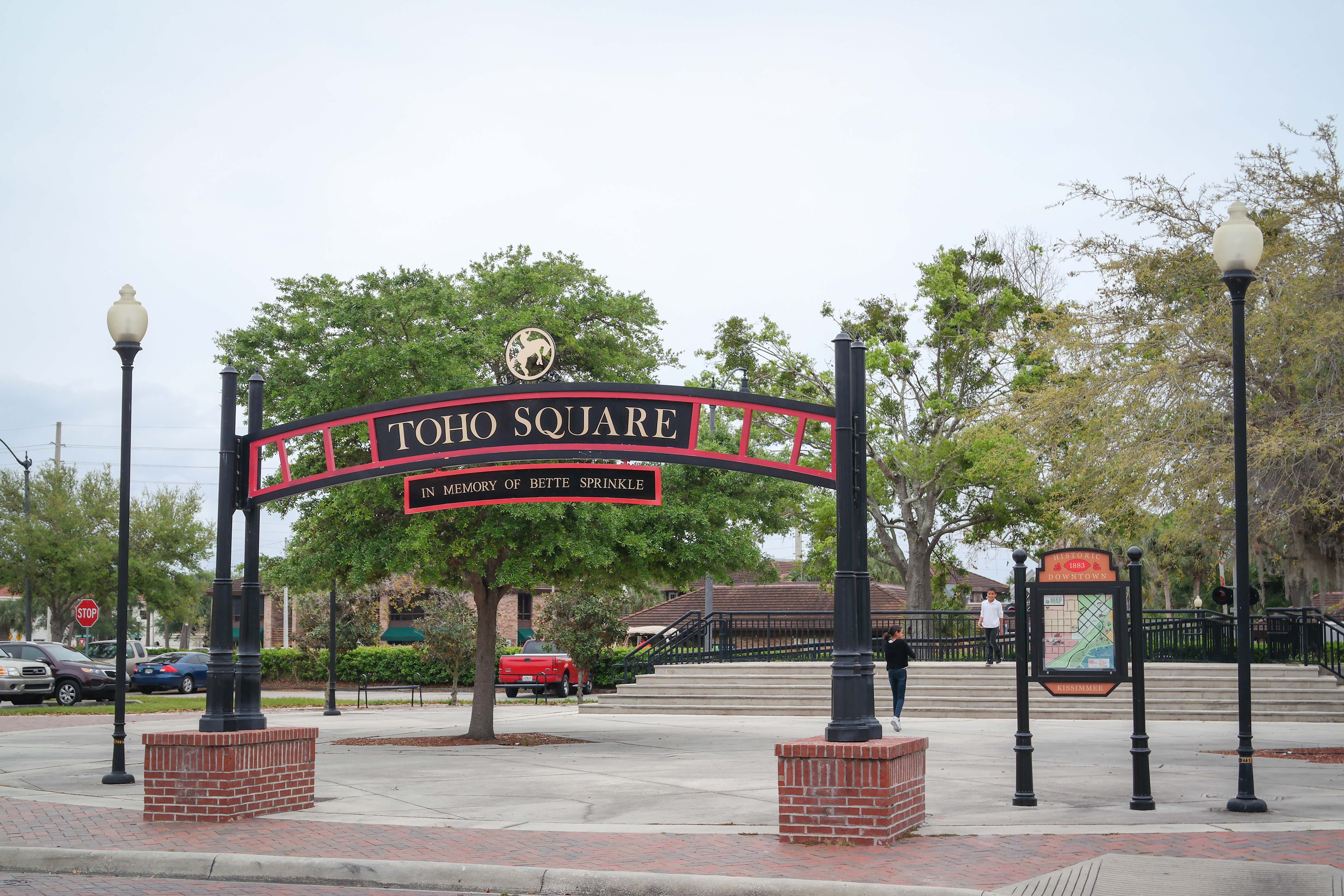
Toho Square at Kissimmee Lakefront Park

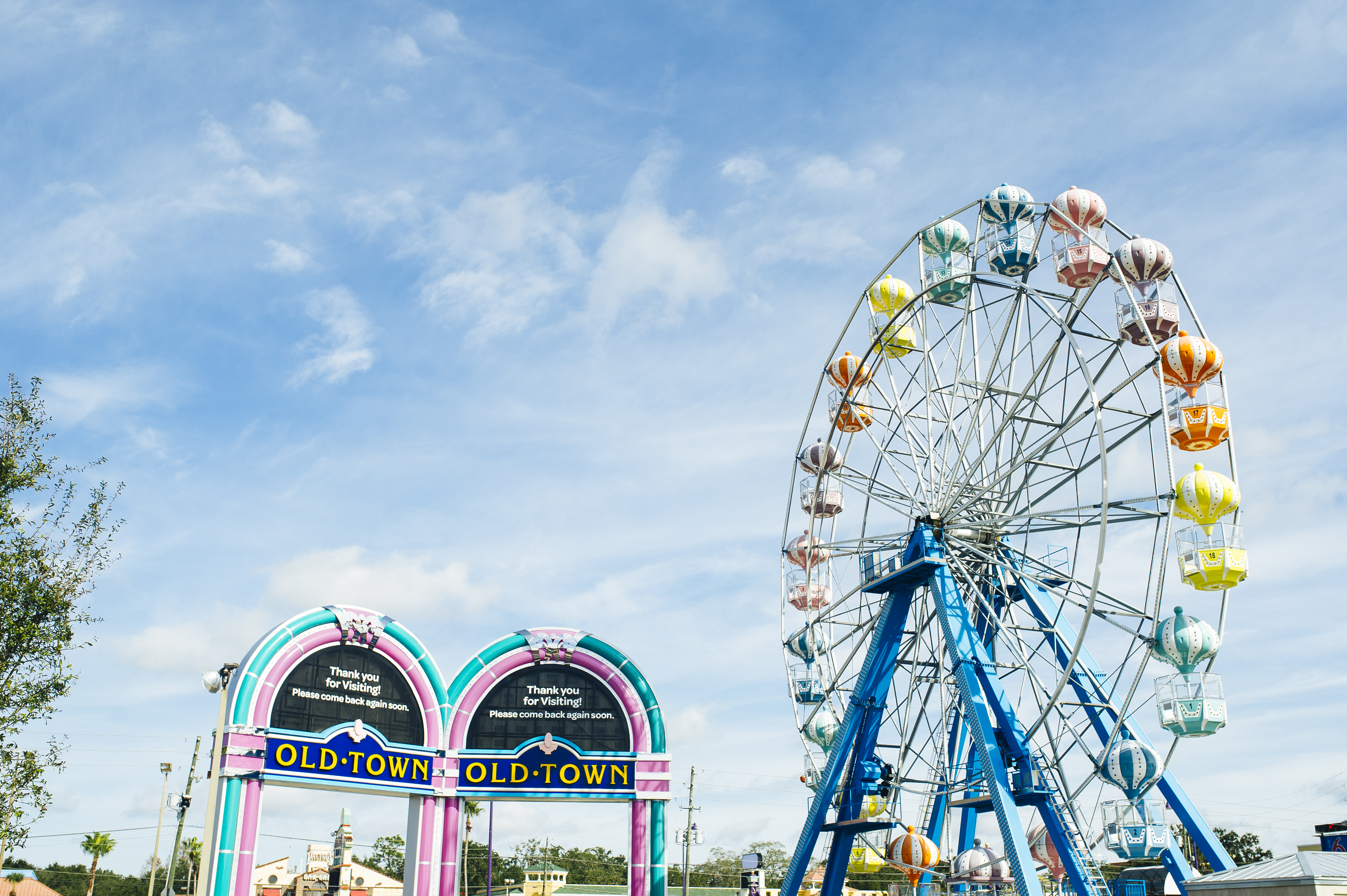
Old Town Amusement Park

=== Sites of interest ===
- Colonial Estate
- Grass Island
- Kissimmee Historic District
  - First United Methodist Church
  - Kissimmee Lakefront Park
  - Kissimmee Lighthouse
  - Monument of States
  - Old Holy Redeemer Catholic Church
  - Old Osceola County Courthouse – oldest continually operating courthouse in the state
  - New Osceola County Courthouse
- The Loop
- Old Town
- Orange World – World's Largest Orange
- Osceola Arts (formally Osceola Center for the Arts)
- Osceola County Welcome Center and History Museum
- Makinson Island

=== Former sites of interest ===
- Jungleland
- Kissimmee Zoo (closed in the early 1970s)
- Splendid China (closed in 2003)
- Water Mania

== Sports ==
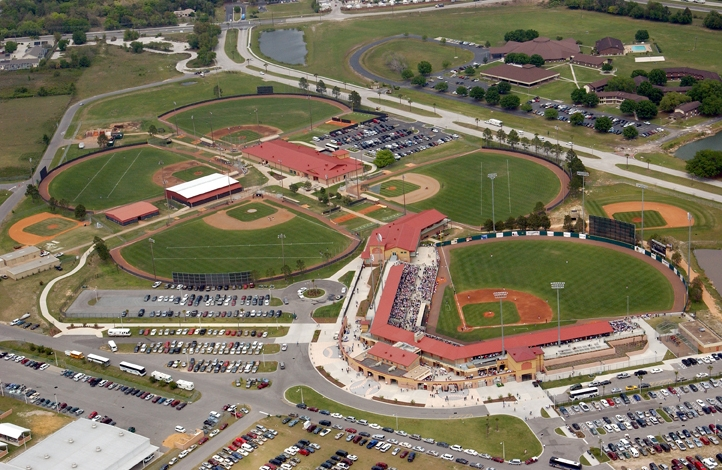
Osceola County Stadium with Johnson University Florida in background

From 1985 to 2016, the Houston Astros conducted spring training in Kissimmee, at Osceola County Stadium. The stadium also hosts numerous amateur baseball events throughout the year in conjunction with USSSA, Triple Crown Sports, World Baseball Federation and Promotion Sports. The Jim Evans Academy of Professional Umpiring has also called Osceola County Stadium home since 1994.

Austin-Tindall Regional Park is an athletic facility in the area that hosts a variety of annual events.

The city is also home to the annual NCCAA men's soccer National Championship Tournament.

Since 2023, the NBA G League team Osceola Magic have been based in Kissimmee. The Osceola Magic play their home games at the Silver Spurs Arena.

== Parks and recreation ==
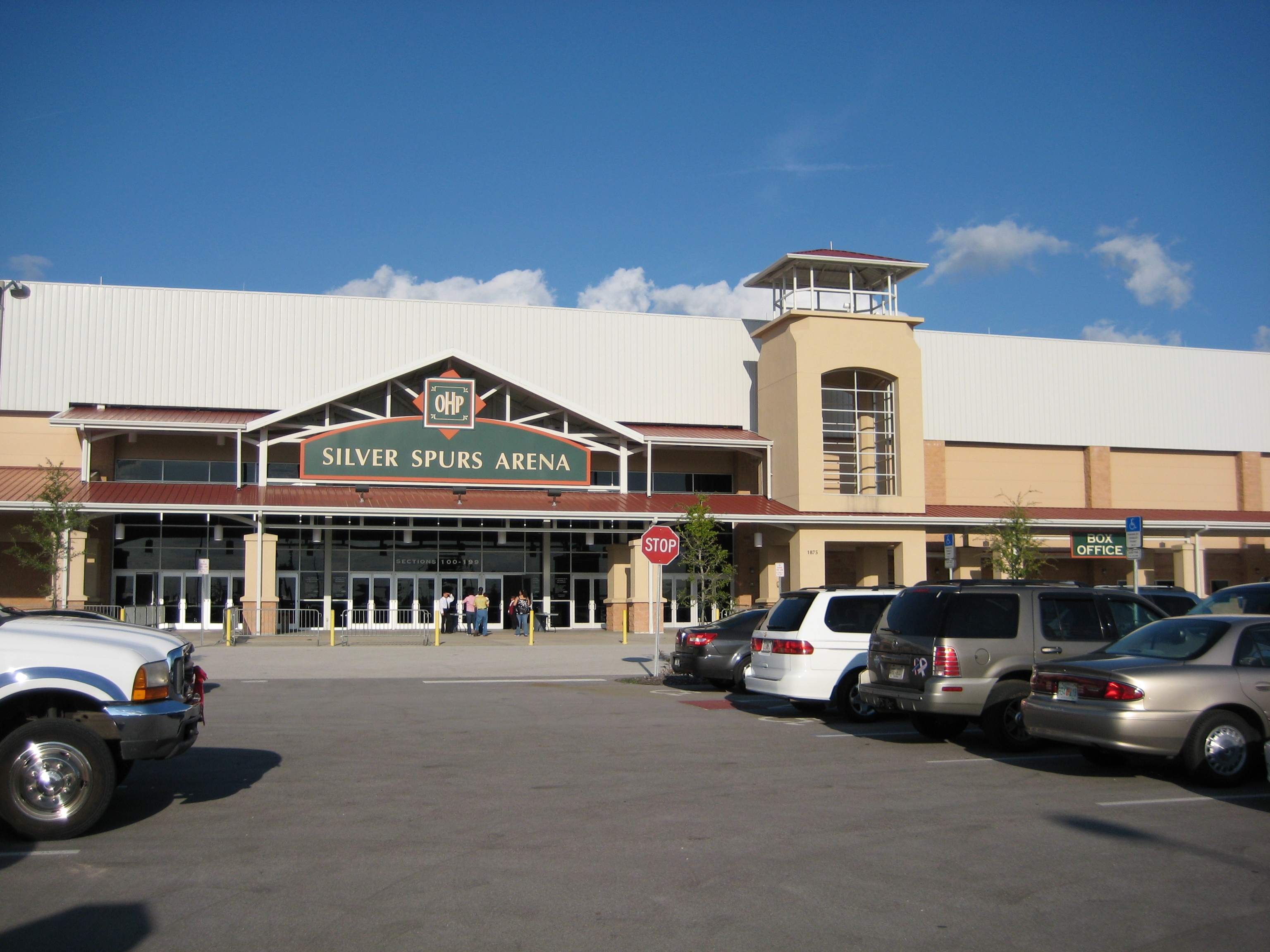
Silver Spurs Arena

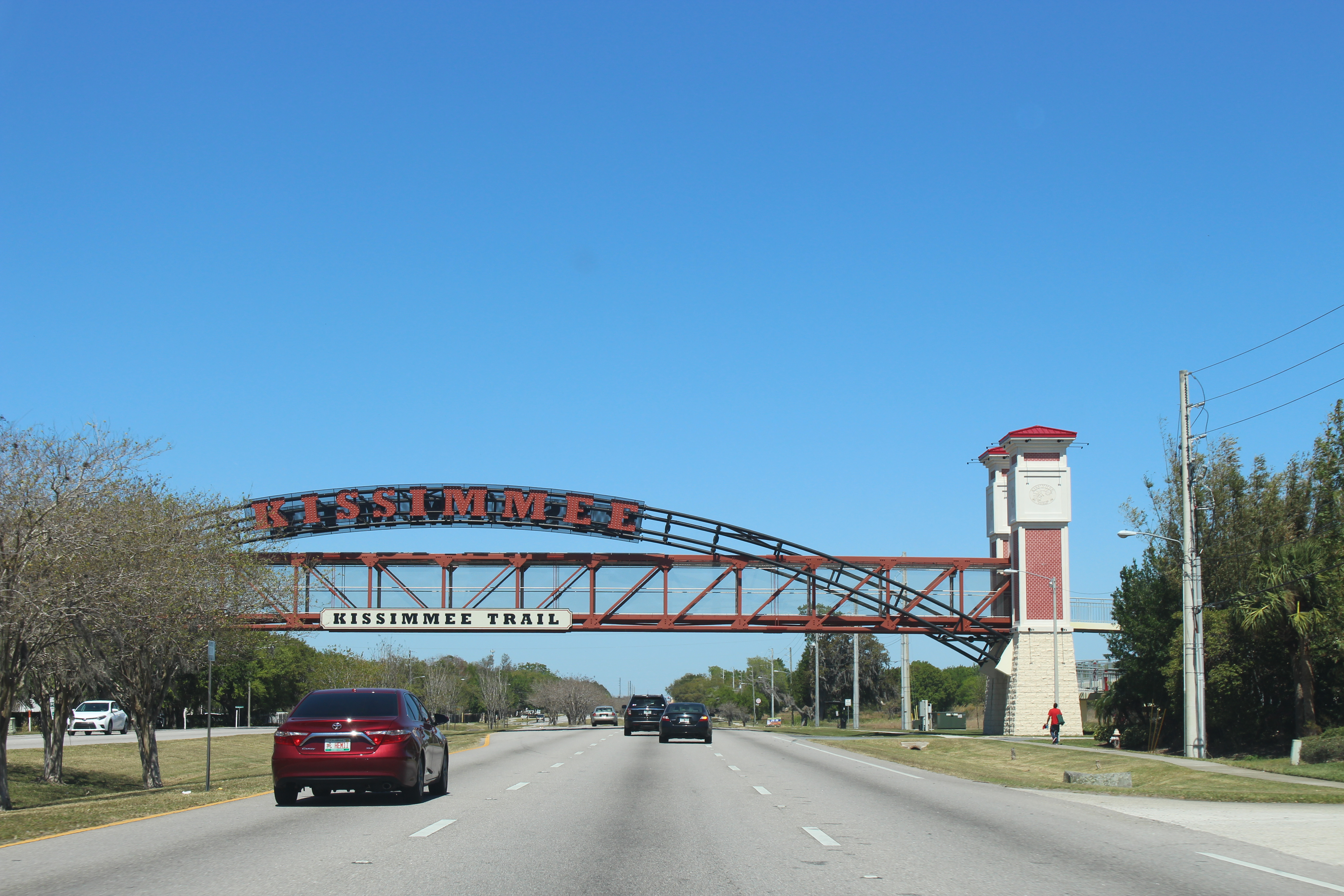
Kissimmee Trail over N John Young Pkwy

Osceola Heritage Park is an event facility featuring a concert arena (Silver Spurs Arena) and professional sports stadium (Osceola County Stadium). The Silver Spurs Arena has hosted many acts, from Hilary Duff and Bob Dylan to an annual rodeo. Jehovah's Witnesses use Silver Spurs Arena for their annual district conventions. In 2008, a number of English and Spanish conventions were held by the Witnesses, bringing thousands of delegates to the Kissimmee area for the three-day events.

Kissimmee has a number of public parks, including:

- Kissimmee Lakefront Park – a $20 million public works project
- Makinson Island Park
- Babb Park at Shingle Creek
- Steffe Landing at Shingle Creek
- Twin Oaks Conservation Area – a popular place with locals for sunset
- Scotty's Landing – a canoe launch/landing featuring an educational area and exercise trail
- Bob Makinson Aquatic Center

=== Biking ===
The Shingle Creek Regional Trail (SCRT) is an inter-governmental project that is planned to connect Kissimmee to Orlando through a 32-mile bicycle trail. It runs along the environmentally sensitive Shingle Creek, and was included on President Obama's America's Great Outdoors list.

=== Golfing ===
Kissimmee is home to a number of golf courses and mini-golf courses.

=== Nearby ===
Kissimmee encompasses the Four Corners District Area, which is home to Universal Orlando Resort and SeaWorld Orlando, and Lake Buena Vista/Bay Lake, and home to Walt Disney World Resort, allowing tourists to access the parks through the city.

== Education ==
=== Public schools ===
The School District of Osceola County serves Kissimmee. High schools include:

- Celebration High School
- Gateway High School
- Harmony High School
- Liberty High School
- Osceola County School for the Arts (6–12)
- Osceola High School
- Poinciana High School
- Saint Cloud High School
- Technical Education Center Osceola
- Tohopekaliga High School
- Neocity Academy

=== Private schools ===
- City of Life, founded 1994
- Freedomland Christian Academy
- Heritage Christian School
- Holy Redeemer Catholic School
- North Kissimmee Christian School, founded 1995
- Osceola Adventist Christian School
- Osceola Christian Preparatory School
- Peace Lutheran School
- Poinciana Academy
- Shady Oaks Private School, founded 1969
- Southland Christian School
- Trinity Lutheran School
- Reborn Christian Academy

=== Institutions of higher education ===
==== State colleges ====
- University of Central Florida, Osceola Campus
- Valencia College, Osceola Campus

==== Private universities, colleges, and others ====
- Johnson University Florida, formerly Florida Christian College

== Infrastructure ==
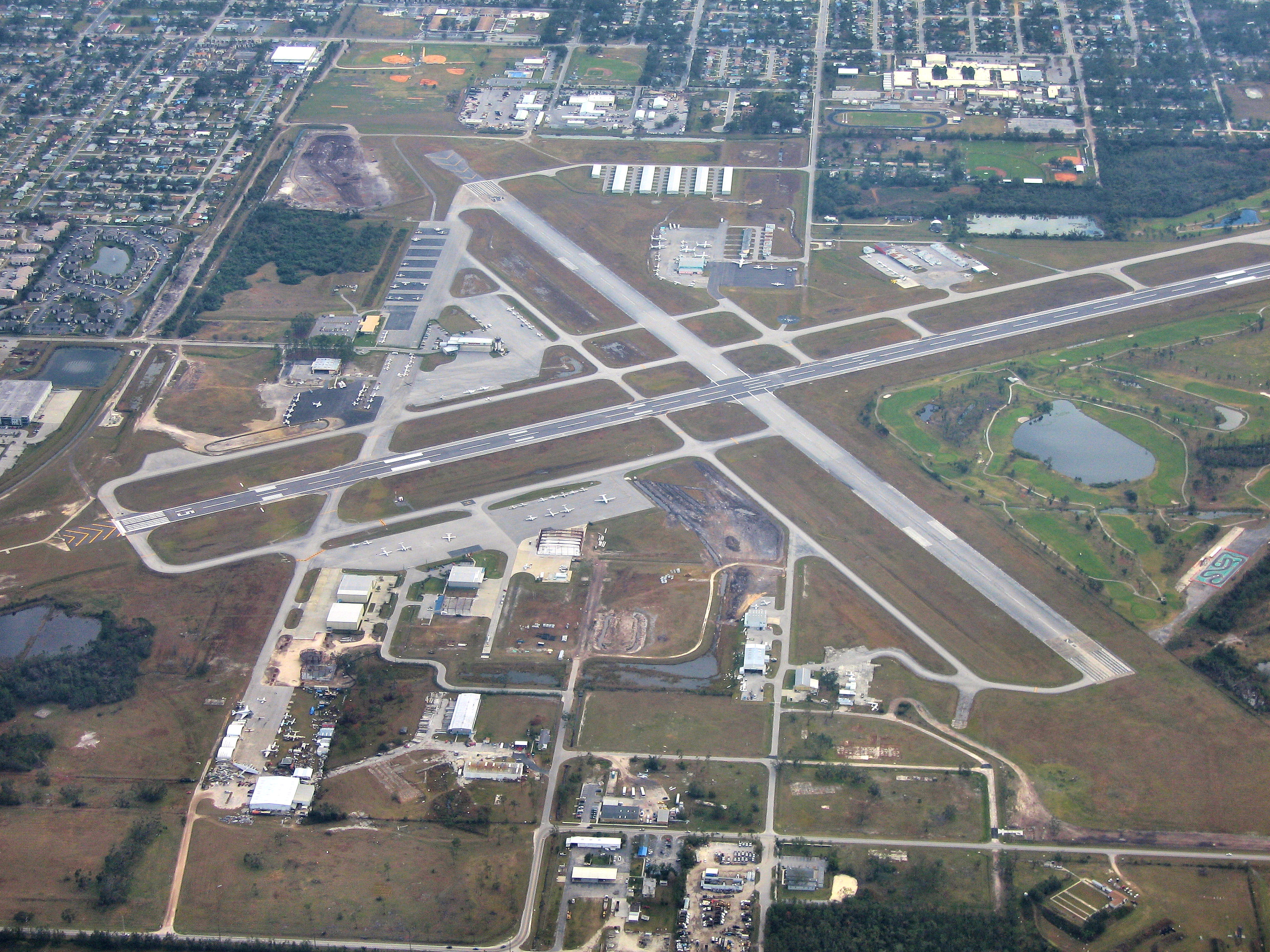
Kissimmee Gateway Airport

=== Transportation ===
Kissimmee features a multi-modal transportation hub between Neptune Road and Monument Street. It includes the Amtrak train station, which is a stop on the SunRail commuter rail system. There is a Greyhound bus station. The hub also has a bus terminal providing service by the Lynx network.

Kissimmee Gateway Airport has four fixed-base operators that provide service to the area. Kissimmee Gateway Airport (ISM) accommodates general aviation air service 24 hours a day with two paved airport runways—respectively 5,000 and 6,000 feet (1,500 and 1,800 m). There are also two flight training schools and a museum at the airport. Orlando International Airport can be reached from Kissimmee in 40 minutes by car.

The major roads in the Kissimmee area are Florida's Turnpike, Interstate 4, Osceola Parkway, and US 192. Among other important routes are US 17/92 that join with US 441 into the Orange Blossom Trail (OBT) and the John Young Parkway.

The city of Kissimmee also runs a service named Freebee Kissimmee which is a cab that provides transportation around Downtown Kissimmee, Advent Health, and Valencia College.

=== Public libraries ===
Osceola Library System operates the Hart Memorial Central Library in Kissimmee.

== Healthcare ==
There are only two hospitals in Kissimmee, AdventHealth Kissimmee and HCA Florida Osceola Hospital.

== Notable people ==
- Irlo Bronson Sr., politician and rancher
- Vassar Clements, bluegrass musician
- Dewayne Douglas, professional football player
- Buddy Dyer, mayor of Orlando
- Tonga Fifita, professional wrestler and actor
- Brent Fullwood, football player
- Justin Gatlin, Olympic and world championship gold medalist sprinter
- Kristina Janolo, Miss Florida 2011
- George Frederic Kribbs, congressman
- Ray Lloyd, professional wrestler and martial artist
- AJ McLean, singer from the Grammy-nominated Backstreet Boys
- James Mitchell, professional wrestling manager
- Victor Montalvo, bboy, first American to qualify for the Olympic Games in the sport of breaking
- Joe Nasco, professional footballer
- Tito Paul, football player
- John Quiñones, attorney and former politician
- Henry L. Reaves, Georgia politician from Kissimmee pioneer ranching family
- Edwin Rios, professional baseball player, 2020 World Series Champion
- William J. Sears, congressman
- Kissy Simmons, actor
- John Milton Bryan Simpson, judge
- Bobby Sippio, football player
- Justin Smith, professional poker player
- Charlee Soto, professional baseball pitcher
- Darren Soto, U.S. representative, former Florida senator and Florida representative
- Jonathan Summerton, race car driver
- Colt Terry, army special forces
- Momo Thomas, American football player
- Vanessa Vanjie Mateo, drag queen
- Dan White, actor in vaudeville, theater, radio, film, and television
- Brett Williams, football player
- Brownie Wise, businesswoman, Tupperware
- Richard Young, actor
