= Kissimmee Historic District =

Historic district in Florida, United States

- U.S. National Register of Historic Places
- U.S. Historic district
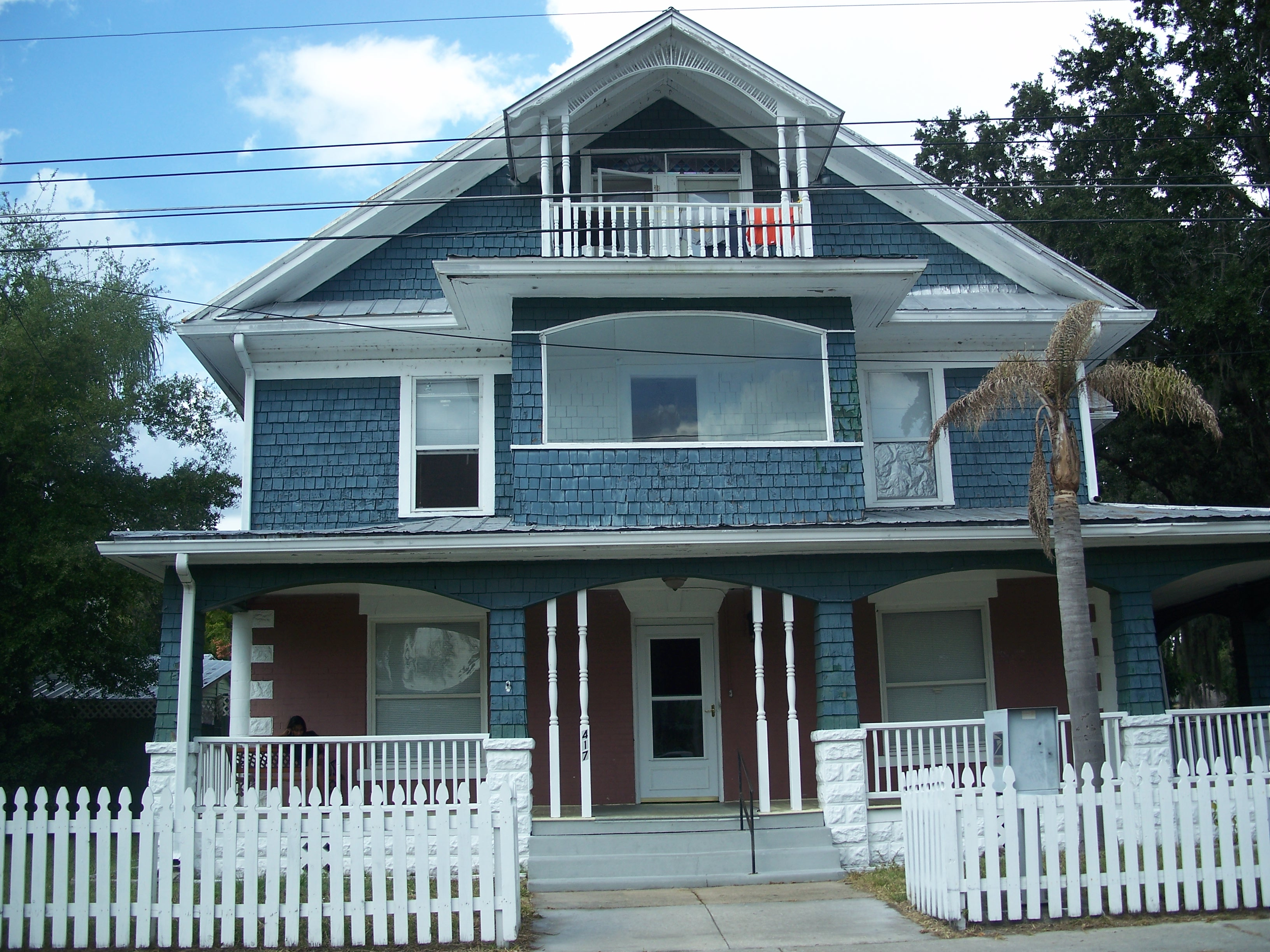

- Location within Florida Location within the United States
- Location: Kissimmee, Florida
- Coordinates: 28°17′31″N 81°24′40″W
- Area: 70 acres (280,000 m^{2})
- NRHP reference No.: 93001454
- Added to NRHP: January 4, 1994

The Kissimmee Historic District is a U.S. historic district (designated as such on January 4, 1994) located in Kissimmee, Florida. The district is bounded by Aultman Street, Monument Avenue, Penfield Street and Randolph Avenue. It contains 189 historic buildings.
