= Osceola County Courthouse (Florida) =

- Old Osceola County Courthouse
- U.S. National Register of Historic Places
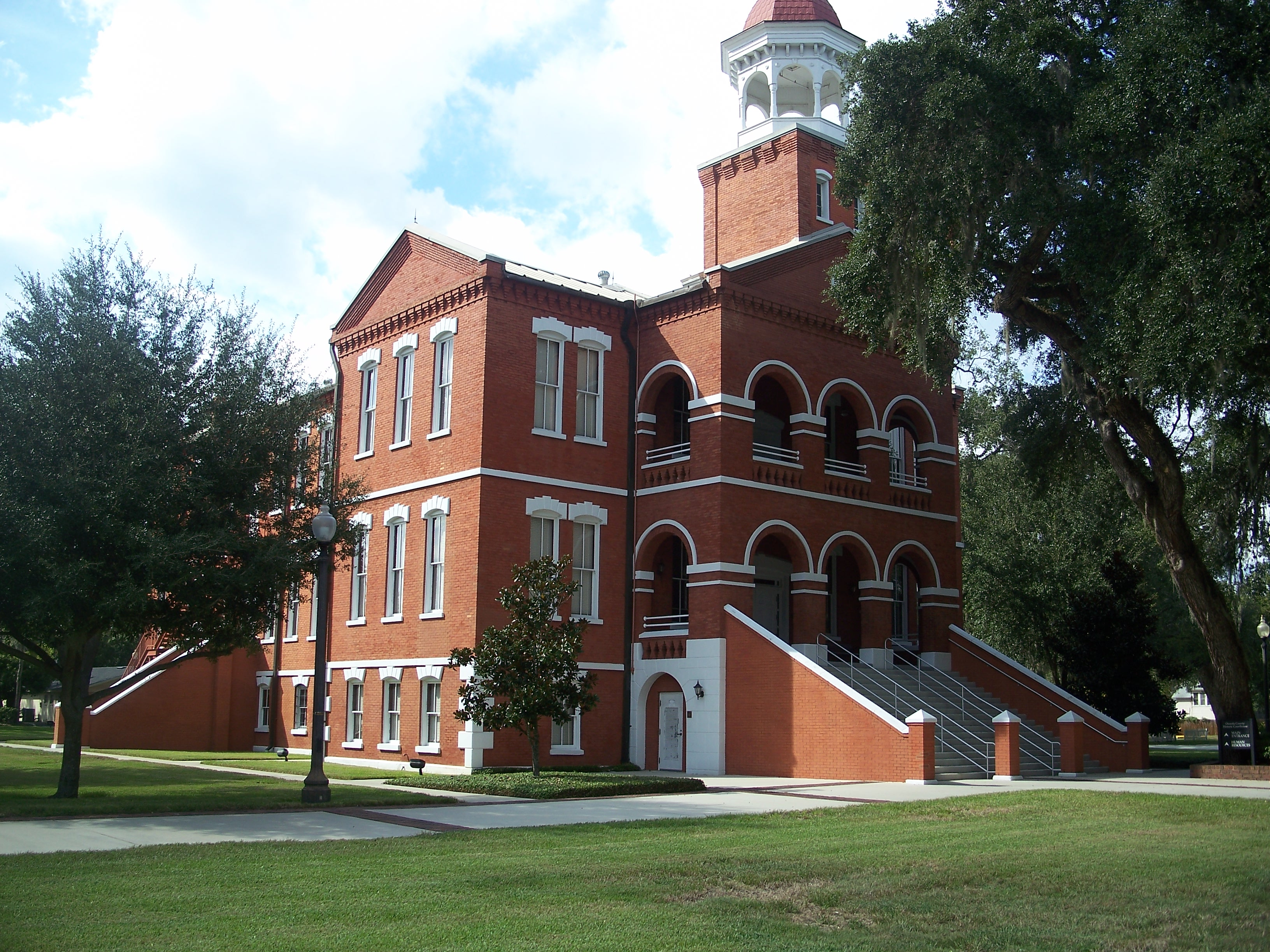

- Location within Florida Location within the United States
- Interactive map showing the location of Osceola County Courthouse
- Location: Kissimmee, Florida
- Coordinates: 28°17′28″N 81°24′42″W
- Built: 1889–1890
- Architectural style: Romanesque
- NRHP reference No.: 77000406
- Added to NRHP: August 16, 1977

The Osceola County Courthouse (constructed in 1889–1890) is a historic courthouse in Kissimmee, Florida, located at 3 Courthouse Square. On August 16, 1977, it was added to the U.S. National Register of Historic Places.

== History ==
Kissimmee City has the oldest Courthouse in the State of Florida. The county Courthouse was formed in 1887; this county came up about from the parts of Orange and Brevard Counties. To determine the name of the county, the county commissioners decided to hold elections on February 6, 1887; the names they come up with for the county was Kissimmee City, Runnymeade, and Hell or Hades; Kissimmee City won with 421 votes. When the elections were done the committee was formed and they started right away to find a location to build a Courthouse and jail for the new County Seat. The D.B. Stewart family helped purchased the Historic Osceola Courthouse in 1888 for $2,205.32.

The new designs for the Courthouse and a jail were ready in August 1888 so they could start building the blue print "building plans" by F.C. Johnson. The type of design is a Typical of Romanesque revival Courthouse that was constructed throughout the United States during the late 1800s. The Osceola Courthouse building is one of four remaining in Florida. The Romanesque architectural elements for the courthouse include the tower that is above the entrance, the round arches that are on the portico—which is also above the doors, and the segmental arches above the windows. The new County held many elections to help raise bonds for the construction of the Courthouse and jail, the first election was held on March 23, 1889; this election was really close and was won by only two more points. Since the first election they held was a "free and open" election the commissioners of the county decided to hold another election on April 10, 1889. On July 1, 1889 thirty bonds were issued in units of 1,000 each with an interest of 7% to pay the Courthouse and jail construction. The final payment on the Courthouse was paid in July 1909.

The new Courthouse had many maintenance problems; for example, in 1892 there were cracks in the plastered walls. The repairs for the tower and roof were done by J.F.Willson with a charge of $21.00 for the repairs of the Courthouse. The County Jail was wired in 1901 and the county paid its first electric bill on April 2, 1901 of $1.64. The county began to rise in technology in 1902 by purchasing its first typewriter at $175.00, and in 1905 the Courthouse got a telephone. Even just renting the phone alone was $2.50 per month, which also made the electric bill rise to $2.79. In February 1907, the bill was paid to Kissimmee Electric Company $131.16 for it to wire the Courthouse which made the electric bill rise to $8.65.

All types of cases were held in the Courthouse from chicken thievery and the selling of moonshine to high-profile murder cases which all have been heard in the Historic Courthouse building. This Historic Court house has been a "home" to numerous judges, clerks of circuit court, probation and parole, county commissioners, the Sheriff and hundreds of employees throughout the years. Osceola County Courthouse made history on August 16, 1977 and was added to the Historic Register. Although Osceola County built a new and larger Courthouse building, the third floor courtroom of the Historic Courthouse building is still an active courtroom, and Osceola County continues to claim the honor of having the oldest Courthouse still being used in the State of Florida.

This information for this short history of the Osceola County Courthouse was gathered from the book 100 Years of Justice by Robert D. Dietrich.
