= Saint Cloud High School =

Location
- 2000 Bulldog Lane; St. Cloud, FL 34769-5268; USA
- 28.23888°N 81.280906°W

Information
- School type: Title I, public, high school
- Motto: Stay Loyal or Stay Limpin
- Opened: 1909
- Status: Active
- School district: School District of Osceola County
- NCES District ID: 1201470
- Superintendent: Mark Shanoff
- CEEB code: 101485
- NCES School ID: 120147001473
- Principal: Nate Fancher
- Deans: Andrea Beckel, Zoraida Santos and Shane Muller
- Teaching staff: 104.00 (FTE)
- Grades: 9-12
- Enrollment: 2,369 (2023-2024)
- Student to teacher ratio: 22.78
- Education system: Secondary education
- Classes offered: Regular, Honors, Advanced Placement, Dual Enrollment
- Language: English
- Campus size: Midsize
- Campus type: Suburban
- Colors: Maroon; Gold
- Slogan: Home of the Bulldogs
- Athletics: Yes
- Athletics conference: Orange Belt Conference
- Sports: Yes
- Mascot: Bulldog
- Rival: Celebration High School, Gateway High School, Harmony High School, Liberty High School, Osceola High School and Poinciana High School
- Accreditation: Southern Association of Colleges and Schools
- Yearbook: Sleeping Tiger
- Feeder schools: St. Cloud Middle School
- Website: schs.osceolaschools.net

Saint Cloud High School is a high school in St. Cloud, Florida.

== History ==
Founded in 1909 as a small school and grew over the years, also growing in value.

== Campus ==
The Saint Cloud High School campus is large in size. It completed its renovation in 2012. It has recently completed a new renovation on its third building.

== Curriculum ==
In addition to the state standard curriculum, Saint Cloud High School offers vocational courses and Army JROTC.

== Extracurricular activities ==
Student groups and activities at Saint Cloud High School include art club, Best Buddies, choir, Marching Band, Golden Girls Dance Team, Theatre Club, FCCLA, HOSA, National Honor Society, student council, JROTC, and yearbook.

The school's athletic teams, known as the St. Cloud Bulldogs, compete in baseball, basketball, cheerleading, cross country, football, golf, soccer, softball, swimming, tennis, track and field, volleyball, weightlifting, and wrestling.

Harmony High School and Osceola High School are their rivals.

== Demographics (As of 2019) ==
Gender

- Male: 49.7%
- Female: 50.3%

Race and Ethnicity

- Black: 6.2%
- Caucasian: 36.95%
- Mixed: 2.5%
- Asian: 1.8%
- American Indian or Alaskan: 0.4%
- Pacific Islander: 0.05%
- Hispanic or Latino of any race: 52.1%

St. Cloud High School has over 2,000 students.
