= Osceola County School for the Arts =

The Osceola County School for the Arts

Location
- 3151 North Orange Blossom Trail; Kissimmee, Florida 34744-1137; United States; 28.337095°N 81.403621°W

Information
- School type: Title I, public
- Motto: Where passion meets purpose
- Established: February 2002
- School district: School District of Osceola County
- NCES District ID: 1201470
- Superintendent: Mark Shanoff
- CEEB code: 100842
- NCES School ID: 120147004119
- Principal: Dennis Neal (2020–present)
- Faculty: 60 (as of 2018–2019)
- Teaching staff: 50 (as of 2018–2019)
- Grades: 6–12
- Gender: Co-educational
- Age range: 11-18
- Enrollment: 970 (2022–2023)
- Student to teacher ratio: 18.93
- Classes offered: Regular, Advanced Placement, Honors
- Language: English
- Hours in school day: 7
- Campus size: Small
- Campus type: Suburban
- Colors: Purple and Teal
- Publication: The OCSA Ledger
- Website: ocsa.osceolaschools.net

The Osceola County School for the Arts (OCSA) is a public magnet arts school located in Kissimmee, Florida. Students can major in one of the following disciplines: Visual Arts, Theater Arts, Vocal Music, Instrumental Music/Band, Creative Writing, Dance, or Orchestra. Middle school students (grades sixth, seventh, and eighth) may major in any discipline.

OCSA enrolls students in grades 6–12 and is part of the School District of Osceola County. The school serves Osceola County, and enrolled 936 students as of the 2018–2019 school year.

== History ==
In an effort to expand the arts program in Osceola County, and prepare students for work in the entertainment industry offered by theme parks and production studios in Central Florida, the School District of Osceola County considered using $6.5 million to build small 600- to 700-seat theaters at Saint Cloud High School, Poinciana High School, and Osceola High School; however, the cost of building the three theaters was estimated at $19.5 million. Only a day after the meeting in August 2001, Tupperware announced that it would be selling part of its world headquarters located on Orange Blossom Trail. The 2,100-seat auditorium on the property was three times larger than any theater the district could build. The plastics company held the property off the market for six months while in negotiations with the School District of Osceola County before the school board members came to a decision. In February 2002, the Osceola County School Board voted to purchase the convention center complex for $6.5 million. The board intended to convert the facility into a Performing Arts middle/high school (6-12) open to students residing in Osceola County. But since 2016, the school has decided to invite students from Orange, Seminole, and Polk counties to apply and audition. The School District of Osceola County decided to build three black box theaters at the three high schools in need of theaters, which would only cost the district $4.5 million.

It was proposed to call the new school "Walter Disney Memorial School for the Arts" to capitalize on the draw of the name, but questions regarding policy for naming schools after people persuaded the school board to reject the proposal. The school board settled on the district's school naming committee's suggestion of "The Osceola County School for the Arts," and named the 2,100-seat theater "The Osceola Performing Arts Center (OPAC)".

In 2004, the Florida Department of Transportation approved the installation of a traffic light to be placed at the intersection of the school's entrance and the highway. The Osceola County School Board paid more than $50,000 for a temporary signal to be placed at the intersection for two years.

Renovations on campus began in July 2007 at the Osceola County School for the Arts and the Osceola Performing Arts Center and its Expo Hall, and ended in mid-2008. Remodeling included renovating 5,600 square feet of the existing banquet hall into three classrooms, which are used for the Drama, Dance and Orchestra programs. The existing storefront glass and doors were replaced, a new awning canopy was added and the acoustical ceiling system and classroom carpets were replaced. The new drama room has the option to be converted into a black box theater when necessary.

OCSA has required school uniforms for its students since Osceola County implemented a uniform dress policy in 2009. In addition to the uniform policy implemented across the county, students may wear purple, navy blue, white or black collared shirts, but no school t-shirts or PE uniforms.

In honor of OCSA's eleventh anniversary, the school hosted a semi-formal gala event on August 15, 2013. The gala has been held every year since, with the exception of 2020 due to the COVID-19 pandemic.

OCSA began undergoing new construction at the beginning of the 2024-2025 school year. The remodeled campus would feature an expanded capacity for more students with a new three story classroom building. The new building will host the media center, updated science labs, and classrooms. The former expo hall was remodeled to accommodate a new dining hall that would have triple the capacity of the original, and feature updated kitchen facilities. Other aspects of the remodel include updating the arts spaces, additional parking spaces for students and staff, repairs to the running track, and separate loops for buses and parents to utilize. The estimated cost of the project, according to the OCSA ledger is somewhere around $43,828,911 USD.

== Campus ==
=== Demographics ===
The Osceola County School for the Arts is a minority-majority school. More than 50 percent of the school's population identifies as Hispanic, and female students outnumber male students by approximately 3 to 1.

As of the 2023-2024 school year, the ethnic makeup of OCSA is as follows:

Ethnicity	Percentage
American Indian / Alaskan Native	0
Asian	3.6
Black / non-Hispanic	5.8
Hispanic / Latino	63.7
White / non-Hispanic	23.9
Native Hawaiian / Pacific Islander	0.2
Multiracial	2.8

== Curriculum ==
The Osceola County School for the Arts operates with 4x4 block scheduling. The school year (mid-August – early June) consists of two 18-week semesters, where each semester has three 90-minute class periods meeting every other day and one 50-minute class period meeting every day. The class schedule alternates between "ABABA" weeks and "BABAB" weeks, where "A" is "Purple" and "B" is "Teal," named after the school colors. Students attend classes Monday through Friday. The two classes following the lunch period on Wednesdays are shorter, after which (on most weeks) students and faculty assemble for an hour-long recital open to the public that showcases students' artistic talents.

Prospective students must submit an application for admission, proper documentation, recent report card and Florida Assessment of Student Thinking (FAST) scores. The potential student will receive a letter in the mail letting them know when the audition for their particular major is. Auditions are held every semester for admission to the following semester. Each major has its own requirements for audition. Nonperformance majors require portfolios. An acceptance letter will be sent in the mail to the student if selected for attending The Osceola County School for the Arts in their desired area of study.

In addition to the regular middle school and high school curriculum, OCSA offers seven artistic programs for students to choose from: Visual Arts, Vocal Music, Instrumental Music/Band, Creative Writing, Dance, Orchestra, or Drama, otherwise known as Theater Arts (which combines stage and set production with acting and drama). In 2025, the school announced it would be incorporating its Creative Writing major into a new Communication Arts major, which would offer additional tracks for Film and Journalism.

The Advanced Placement (AP) participation rate of juniors and seniors is 81 percent. The graduation rate as of the 2012–2013 school year is 100 percent. Post-high school plans for students are represented in the following chart:

Post-high school plans	2010–2011
Four-year university	45%
Community college	46%
Military or technical school	6%
Employment	3%

== Extracurricular activities ==
The Osceola County School for the Arts offers various clubs, organizations and sports. Clubs include National Honor Society, Student Government Association, and Technology Student Association, some other notable clubs are Mu Alpha Theta (Math Club), Environmental Club, Fashion Club, Interact, Keyettes, Anime and Cosplay Club, Tri-M Music Honor Society and National Art Honor Society.

== Awards and recognition ==
The Osceola County School for the Arts has been rated an "A" school in the grading system that uses the Florida Comprehensive Assessment Test as its standard for eleven consecutive years. In 2011 and every consecutive year, the school has been ranked #228 out of 500 high schools in the United States and #16 out of 89 high schools in Florida. It has been awarded a gold medal by U.S. News & World Report, and was ranked #104 out of 2,081 high schools on the Washington Post″s "America's Most Challenging High Schools." The Florida Department of Education awarded OCSA an "A" grade in December 2013 with prestigious Gold Medal status, due to the school's 100% graduation rate, FCAT testing results with math and reading proficiency, and college readiness during the 2012–2013 school year, making the Osceola County School for the Arts an "A" school for 10 years in a row.

Other accolades include the selection of the Osceola County School for the Arts Jazz Band "A" as 1 of 15 finalists in the 19th, 22nd, 23rd, 27th, 28th, 29th, and 30th Annual Essentially Ellington National High School Jazz Band competition in New York City. Jazz Band "A" placed 1st in the competition for 2022 and 2023. They also notably placed in the top 3 for 2024 and 2025's Essentially Ellington competition. It was ranked #778 out of 2,000 public high schools on The Daily Beast's "America's Best High Schools."

The OCSA Class of 2019 dedicated a mass art mural as a legacy. The class of 2019 collected over $7.9 million dollars in scholarships from many colleges around the world.

== Notable staff ==
- Donna Hart, former mayor of St. Cloud

== Former principals ==
- 2002–2007 Michael Vondracek
- 2007–2010 Jeanette Paul Rivers
- 2010–2013 Charles Mytron Lisby
- 2013–2015 Jonathan Rasmussen
- 2015–2020 Chundra Evens
- 2020–Present Dennis Neal
