= Justin Hilton =

American football player (born 1988)

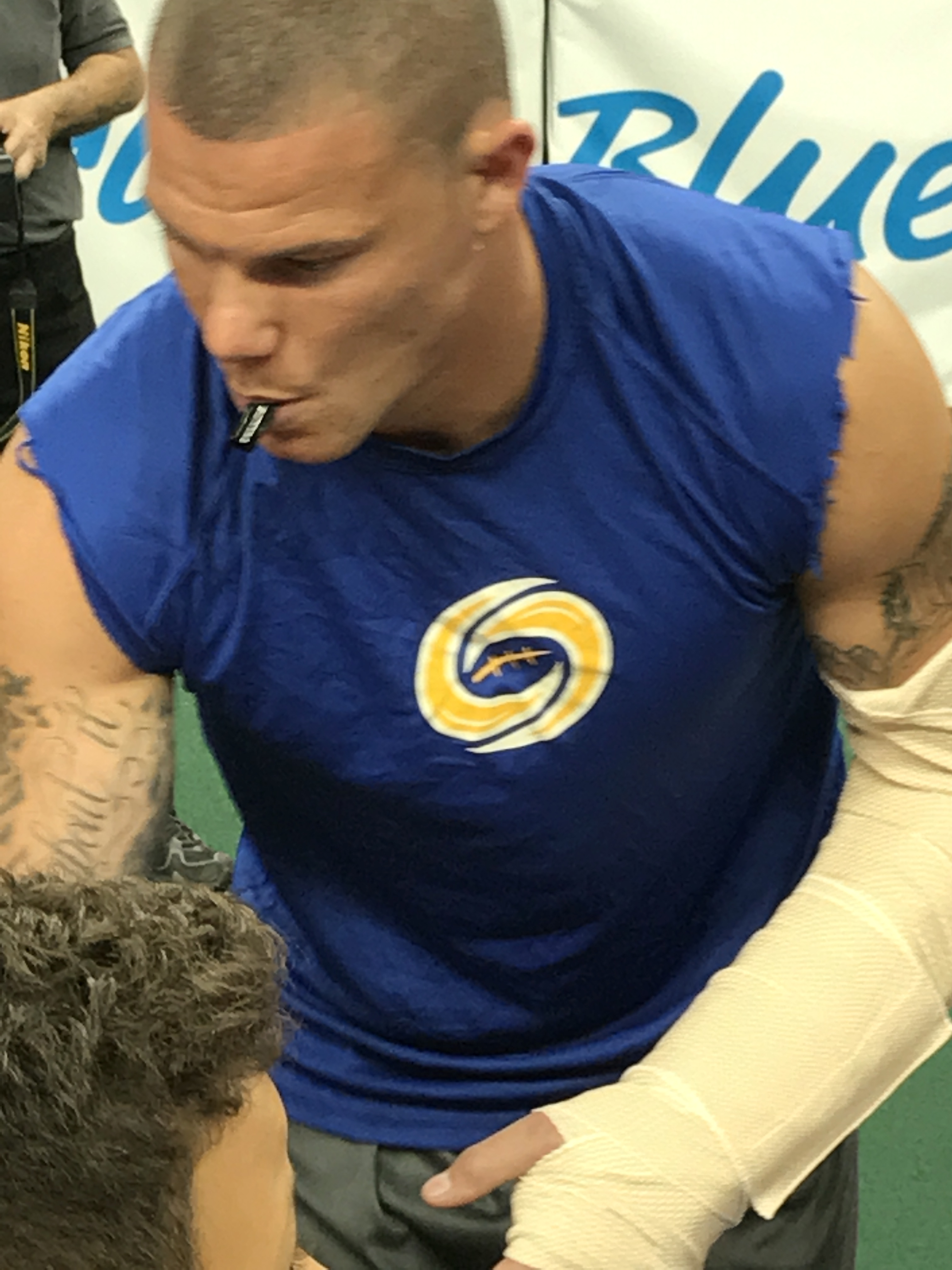
- Hilton with the Tampa Bay Storm in 2017

No. 10, 15
- Position: Wide receiver

Personal information
- Born: December 8, 1988 (age 37); Baltimore, Maryland, U.S.
- Listed height: 6 ft 2 in (1.88 m)
- Listed weight: 190 lb (86 kg)

Career information
- High school: Harmony (FL)
- College: Indiana State
- NFL draft: 2012: undrafted

Career history
- Cincinnati Bengals (2012−2013)*; Tampa Bay Storm (2013–2014); Tennessee Titans (2013)*; Orlando Predators (2014–2015); Spokane Shock (2015); Orlando Predators (2015); Tampa Bay Storm (2017); Florida Tarpons (2018)
- * Offseason or practice squad member only

Career AFL statistics
- Receptions: 75
- Receiving yards: 973
- Receiving touchdowns: 21
- Stats at ArenaFan.com
- Stats at Pro Football Reference

Justin Hilton (born December 8, 1988) is an American former football wide receiver. Hilton played college football at Indiana State.

== Early life ==
Hilton attended Harmony High School in Harmony, Florida.

== College career ==
Hilton played college football for Indiana State.

== Professional career ==
=== Cincinnati Bengals ===
Following the 2012 NFL draft, Hilton was signed as an undrafted free agent by the Cincinnati Bengals. Justin was Waived by the Bengals on August 29, 2012.

Hilton was signed to the Bengals practice squad on January 1, 2013. He was moved to the Bengals team roster on January 7, 2013. He was waived on May 2, 2013.

=== Tampa Bay Storm ===
On July 3, 2013, Hilton was assigned to the Tampa Bay Storm of the Arena Football League. Hilton was reassigned on July 7. Hilton was assigned again on July 11, 2013.

=== Tennessee Titans ===
Hilton was signed by the Tennessee Titans on July 30, 2013. On August 26, 2013, he was waived by the Titans.

=== Orlando Predators ===
Hilton played for the Orlando Predators in 2015.

=== Spokane Shock ===
On May 7, 2015, Hilton was traded to the Spokane Shock for future considerations.

=== Orlando Predators ===
On May 8, 2015, the Shock traded Hilton back to Orlando.

=== Tampa Bay Storm ===
In January 2017, Hilton was assigned to the Tampa Bay Storm. The Storm folded in December 2017.

=== Florida Tarpons ===
Hilton signed with the Florida Tarpons of the American Arena League on January 18, 2018
