= School District of Osceola County, Florida =

School district in Florida, United States

Coordinates: 28.2986°N 81.3616°W

Address
- 817 Bill Beck Blvd. Kissimmee, Florida, 34744; United States

District information
- Type: Public
- Motto: “Every Child, Every Chance, Every Day!”
- Grades: PK-12
- Superintendent: Mark Shanoff
- NCES District ID: 1201470

Students and staff
- Enrollment: 73,558 (as of 2022-23)
- Staff: 3,973.25 classroom teachers (FTE); 4,839.02 other staff (FTE) (as of 2022-23)
- Student–teacher ratio: 18.51 (as of 2022-23)

Other information
- Website: www.osceolaschools.net

The School District of Osceola County, Florida is a school district serving all of Osceola County, Florida with 84 schools.

== History ==
There was only one middle school in Kissimmee in 1974. It was called Beaumont Middle School and students began attending in August 1974. Denn John Middle School opened in January 1975. Student volunteers helped ready the school for opening the first day back from Christmas break.

In 2021, during the COVID-19 pandemic in Florida, the district began requiring PreK-8 students to wear masks unless their parents opted them out.

== Schools ==
=== Elementary schools ===
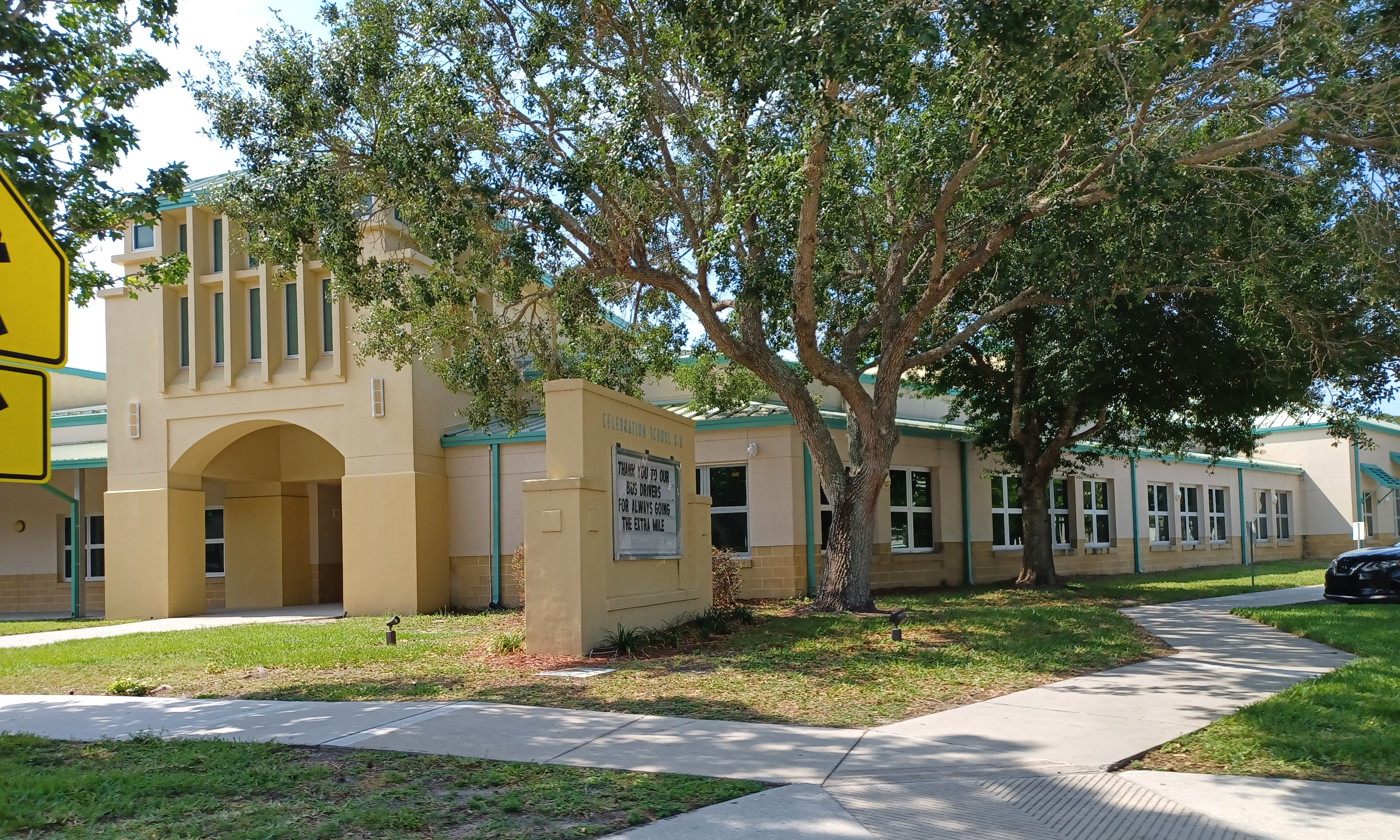
Celebration School

- Boggy Creek Elementary School
- Celebration School (K-8)
- Central Avenue Elementary School
- Chestnut Elementary School for Science and Engineering
- Cypress Elementary School
- Deerwood Elementary School
- East Lake Elementary School
- Flora Ridge Elementary School
- Harmony Community School (PreK-8)
- Hickory Tree Elementary School
- Highlands Elementary School
- Kissimmee Elementary School
- Koa Elementary School
- Lakeview Elementary School
- Michigan Avenue Elementary School
- Mill Creek Elementary School
- Narcoossee Elementary School
- Neptune Elementary School
- Partin Settlement Elementary School
- Pleasant Hill Elementary School
- Poinciana Academy of Fine Arts
- Reedy Creek Elementary School
- St. Cloud Elementary School
- Sunrise Elementary School
- Thacker Avenue Elementary for International Studies
- Ventura Elementary School

=== Middle schools ===
- Celebration School (K-8)
- Denn John Middle School
- Discovery Intermediate School
- Harmony Community School (PreK-8)
- Horizon Middle School
- Kissimmee Middle School
- Narcoossee Middle School
- Neptune Middle School
- Osceola County School For The Arts (6–12)
- Parkway Middle School
- St. Cloud Middle School
- Harmony Middle School K-8

=== Multilevel schools ===
- Celebration School (K-8)
- Harmony Community School (PreK-8)
- Knights Point K-8 (K-8)
- Osceola County School For The Arts (6–12)
- Osceola Virtual School (K-8)
- Osceola Virtual Secondary School (6–12)
- The Kindred K-8 School
- Westside K-8 School
- Voyager K-8 School
- Canoe Creek K-8 School
- Cross Prairie K-8 School
- Bellalago Charter Academy

=== High schools ===
- Celebration High School (Storm)
- Gateway High School (Panther)
- Harmony High School (Longhorn)
- Liberty High School (Charger)
- Nova Lakes High School (Rattler)
- Osceola County School For The Arts (6–12)
- Osceola High School (Cowboy)
- Poinciana High School (Eagle)
- Professional and Technical High School (PATHS) (Patriot)
- Saint Cloud High School (Bulldog)
- Tohopekaliga High School (Tiger)
- NeoCity Academy (Knight)
- Osceola Virtual Secondary School (6–12)

=== Charter schools ===
- Acclaim Academy Charter School (7–12)
- Bellalago Charter Academy (K-8)
- Canoe Creek Charter Academy School (K-8)
- Florida Virtual Academy at Osceola County (K-9)
- Four Corners Charter Elementary School (K-5)
- Four Corners Upper School (6–11)
- iVirtual League Academy (6–11)
- Kissimmee Charter Academy School (PreK-8)
- Mavericks High School (Ages 15 – 21)
- New Dimensions High School
- P.M. Wells Charter Academy School (K-8)
- Renaissance Charter School at Poinciana (K-8)
- UCP Child Development Center (Birth - 5 years)

=== Alternative programs ===
- Challenger Learning Center
- New Beginnings Education Center
- Oasis Residential Center
- Osceola Regional Juvenile Commitment Facility
- Zenith School

=== Adult education ===
- Adult Learning Center Osceola (ALCO)
- Challenger Learning Center
- Endeavor
- Technical Education Center Osceola (TECO)

=== Virtual schools ===
- Osceola Virtual School (K-8)
- Osceola Virtual Secondary School (6–12)
- Florida Virtual Academy at Osceola County (K-9)
- iVirtual League Academy (6–11)

=== Other provision ===
The district operates a READ bus equipped with resources to engage pre-school children and their parents.
