= 2000 Major League Baseball draft =

Baseball draft of amateur players by Major League Baseball

General information
- Date: June 2000

Overview
- 1,452 total selections
- First selection: Adrián González; Florida Marlins
- First round selections: 40

The 2000 Major League Baseball draft, was the annual choosing of high school and college baseball players, held in June 2000. A total of 1,452 players were drafted.

== First round selections ==
= All-Star

Pick	Player	Team	Position	Hometown/School
1	Adrián González	Florida Marlins	1B	Eastlake High School (CA)
2	Adam Johnson	Minnesota Twins	RHP	Cal State Fullerton
3	Luis Montanez	Chicago Cubs	SS	Coral Park High School (FL)
4	Mike Stodolka	Kansas City Royals	LHP	Centennial High School (CA)
5	Justin Wayne	Montreal Expos	RHP	Stanford
6	Rocco Baldelli	Tampa Bay Devil Rays	OF	Bishop Hendricken High School (RI)
7	Matt Harrington	Colorado Rockies	RHP	Palmdale High School (CA)
8	Matt Wheatland	Detroit Tigers	RHP	Rancho Bernardo High School (CA)
9	Mark Phillips	San Diego Padres	LHP	Hanover High School (PA)
10	Joe Torres	Anaheim Angels	LHP	Gateway High School (FL)
11	Dave Krynzel	Milwaukee Brewers	OF	Green Valley High School (NV)
12	Joe Borchard	Chicago White Sox	OF	Stanford
13	Shaun Boyd	St. Louis Cardinals	2B	Vista High School (CA)
14	Beau Hale	Baltimore Orioles	RHP	Texas
15	Chase Utley	Philadelphia Phillies	2B	UCLA
16	Billy Traber	New York Mets (Note: Pick from Seattle Mariners as compensation for signing of free agent John Olerud)	LHP	Loyola Marymount
17	Ben Diggins	Los Angeles Dodgers	RHP	Arizona
18	Miguel Negron	Toronto Blue Jays	OF	Manuela Toro High School (PR)
19	Sean Burnett	Pittsburgh Pirates	LHP	Wellington High School (FL)
20	Chris Bootcheck	Anaheim Angels (Note: Pick from Oakland Athletics as compensation for signing of free agent Mike Magnante)	RHP	Auburn
21	John Bonser	San Francisco Giants	RHP	Gibbs High School (FL)
22	Phil Dumatrait	Boston Red Sox	LHP	Bakersfield College
23	David Espinosa	Cincinnati Reds	SS	Gulliver Preparatory School (FL)
24	Blake Williams	St. Louis Cardinals (Note: Pick from Texas Rangers as compensation for signing of free agent Darren Oliver)	RHP	Texas State
25	Scott Heard	Texas Rangers (Note: Pick from New York Mets as compensation for signing of free agent Todd Zeile)	C	Rancho Bernardo High School (CA)
26	Corey Smith	Cleveland Indians	SS	Piscataway High School (NJ)
27	Robert Stiehl	Houston Astros	RHP	El Camino College
28	David Parrish	New York Yankees	C	Michigan
29	Adam Wainwright	Atlanta Braves (Note: Pick from Arizona Diamondbacks as compensation for signing of free agent Russ Springer)	RHP	Glynn Academy (GA)
30	Scott Thorman	Atlanta Braves	3B	Preston High School (ON)

== Compensation picks ==
Pick	Player	Team	Position	School
31	Aaron Heilman	Minnesota Twins (Note: Supplemental pick for loss of free agent Mike Trombley)	RHP	Notre Dame
32	Tripper Johnson	Baltimore Orioles (Note: Supplemental pick for loss of free agent Arthur Rhodes)	RHP	Newport High School (WA)
33	Dustin McGowan	Toronto Blue Jays (Note: Supplemental pick for loss of free agent Graeme Lloyd)	RHP	Long County High School (GA)
34	Dustin Moseley	Cincinnati Reds (Note: Supplemental pick for loss of free agent Juan Guzman)	RHP	Arkansas High School (AR)
35	Carlton Godwin	Texas Rangers (Note: Supplemental pick for loss of free agent Aaron Sele)	OF	North Carolina
36	Bobby Keppel	New York Mets (Note: Supplemental pick for loss of free agent John Olerud)	RHP	De Smet Jesuit High School (MO)
37	Derek Thompson	Cleveland Indians (Note: Supplemental pick for loss of free agent Mike Jackson)	LHP	Land o' Lakes High School (FL)
38	Kelly Johnson	Atlanta Braves (Note: Supplemental pick for loss of free agent Russ Springer)	SS	Westwood High School (TX)
39	Chad Hawkins	Texas Rangers (Note: Supplemental pick for loss of free agent Todd Zeile)	RHP	Baylor
40	Aaron Herr	Atlanta Braves (Note: Supplemental pick for loss of free agent Mike Magnante)	SS	Hempfield High School (PA)

== Background ==
The Florida Marlins made Adrián González of Eastlake High School in Chula Vista, California the first overall selection in the 2000 First-Year Player Draft. González, who was rated as the best pure high school hitter in the draft by Baseball America, was the first high school first baseman taken first overall since the New York Yankees chose Ron Blomberg in 1967. In his senior year, González hit .645 with 13 home runs and 34 RBI.

Among the college players chosen was David Parrish, son of former major leaguer Lance Parrish, by the New York Yankees with the 28th pick. In addition, David Espinosa, a high school shortstop from Miami, Florida, became the first RBI (Reviving Baseball in Inner Cities) alumnus ever selected in the first round of the draft.

Infielder Xavier Nady, second-round pick of the San Diego Padres out of the University of California, went straight to the Major Leagues in 2000. He became the 19th player to do so since the draft started in 1965.

== Other notable players ==
- Xavier Nady, 2nd round, 49th overall by the San Diego Padres
- Chris Narveson, 2nd round, 53rd overall by the St. Louis Cardinals
- Brian Tallet, 2nd round, 55th overall by the Cleveland Indians
- Joel Hanrahan, 2nd round, 57th overall by the Los Angeles Dodgers
- Manny Delcarmen, 2nd round, 62nd overall by the Boston Red Sox
- Chad Qualls, 2nd round, 67th overall by the Houston Astros
- Grady Sizemore, 3rd round, 75th overall by the Montreal Expos
- Michael Morse, 3rd round, 82nd overall by the Chicago White Sox
- Chris Young, 3rd round, 89th overall by the Pittsburgh Pirates
- Todd Wellemeyer, 4th round, 103rd overall by the Chicago Cubs
- David DeJesus, 4th round, 104th overall by the Kansas City Royals
- Cliff Lee, 4th round, 105th overall by the Montreal Expos
- Yadier Molina, 4th round, 113th overall by the St. Louis Cardinals
- Laynce Nix, 4th round, 124th overall by the Texas Rangers
- Garrett Atkins, 5th round, 137th overall by the Colorado Rockies
- Bobby Jenks, 5th round, 140th overall by the Anaheim Angels
- Taylor Buchholz, 6th round, 175th overall by the Philadelphia Phillies
- Aaron Hill, 7th round, 200th overall by the Anaheim Angels
- Dontrelle Willis, 8th round, 223rd overall by the Chicago Cubs
- Nick Masset, 8th round, 244th overall by the Texas Rangers
- Brandon Webb, 8th round, 249th overall by the Arizona Diamondbacks
- Edwin Encarnación, 9th round, 274th overall by the Texas Rangers
- Clint Barmes, 10th round, 287th overall by the Colorado Rockies
- Brad Hawpe, 11th round, 317th overall by the Colorado Rockies
- Corey Hart, 11th round, 321st overall by the Milwaukee Brewers
- Freddy Sanchez, 11th round, 332nd overall by the Boston Red Sox
- Jason Kubel, 12th round, 342nd overall by the Minnesota Twins
- Brian Bruney, 12th round, 369th overall by the Arizona Diamondbacks
- Keoni DeRenne, 12th round, 370th overall by the Atlanta Braves
- Ryan Church, 14th round, 426h overall by the Cleveland Indians
- James Shields, 16th round, 466th overall by the Tampa Bay Devil Rays
- Josh Willingham, 17th round, 491st overall by the Florida Marlins
- Paul Maholm, 17th round, 492nd overall by the Minnesota Twins, but did not sign
- Mike Napoli, 17th round, 500th overall by the Anaheim Angels
- Rich Harden, 17th round, 510th overall by the Oakland Athletics
- Michael Bourn, 19th round, 577th overall by the Houston Astros, but did not sign
- José Bautista, 20th round, 599th overall by the Pittsburgh Pirates
- Jason Bay, 22nd round, 645th overall by the Montreal Expos
- Jason Hammel, 23rd round, 686th overall by the Seattle Mariners, but did not sign
- Nate McLouth, 25th round, 749th overall by the Pittsburgh Pirates
- Chad Cordero, 26th round, 769th overall by the San Diego Padres, but did not sign
- Ian Snell, 26th round, 779th overall by the Pittsburgh Pirates
- Kason Gabbard, 29th round, 872nd overall by the Boston Red Sox, signed in May 2001
- Ian Kinsler, 29th round, 879th overall by the Arizona Diamondbacks, but did not sign
- Adam LaRoche, 29th round, 880th overall by the Atlanta Braves
- Brian Wilson, 30th round, 906th overall by the Cleveland Indians, but did not sign
- Nick Blackburn, 34th round, 1006th overall by the Tampa Bay Devil Rays, but did not sign
- Russell Martin, 35th round, 1035th overall by the Montreal Expos, but did not sign
- Tim Stauffer, 36th round, 1074th overall by the Baltimore Orioles, but did not sign
- Scott Baker, 36th round, 1079th overall by the Pittsburgh Pirates, but did not sign
- Tom Gorzelanny, 38th round, 1132nd overall by the Chicago White Sox, but did not sign
- Luke Scott, 45th round, 1327th overall by the Tampa Bay Devil Rays, but did not sign
- David Murphy, 50th round, 1439th overall by the Anaheim Angels, but did not sign

=== NFL players drafted ===
- Mewelde Moore, 4th round, 109th overall by the San Diego Padres
- Michael Vick, 30th round, 887th overall by the Colorado Rockies, but did not sign
- Ronnie Brown, 42nd round, 1253rd overall by the Seattle Mariners, but did not sign
- Freddie Mitchell, 50th round, 1441st overall by the Chicago White Sox, but did not sign
- Brooks Bollinger, 50th round, 1443rd overall by the Los Angeles Dodgers, but did not sign

== Notes ==
Preceded by Josh Hamilton	1st Overall Picks; Adrián González	Succeeded by Joe Mauer
