= Elijah Melendez =

American football linebacker

No. 9 – Auburn Tigers
- Position: Linebacker
- Class: Sophomore

Personal information
- Listed height: 6 ft 0 in (1.83 m)
- Listed weight: 240 lb (109 kg)

Career information
- High school: Osceola (Kissimmee, Florida)
- College: Auburn (2025–present)
- Stats at ESPN

Elijah Melendez is an American football linebacker for the Auburn Tigers.

== Early life ==
Melendez attended Osceola High School in Kissimmee, Florida. He was rated as a four-star recruit by 247Sports and committed to play college football for the Miami Hurricanes over offers from Auburn, Oklahoma, and Ole Miss. However, Melendez eventually de-committed from the Hurricanes and reopened his recruitment. Ultimately, he committed to play for the Auburn Tigers.

== College career ==
As a freshman during the 2025 season, Melendez notched 29 tackles with three for a loss, a sack, two interceptions, and a touchdown, earning SEC all-Freshman honors. After the season, he announced his return to the Tigers for the 2026 season. In the 2026 season opener, Melendez recorded 12 tackles with a tackle and a half for a loss, and two pass deflections in a win over Baylor.
