= Sylmar High School =

Coordinates: 34.307°N 118.441°W

Sylmar Charter High School
- 13050 Borden Ave. Sylmar, CA 91342; United States

Information
- Type: Public school, Charter
- Established: September 11, 1961
- Status: 🟩 Opened
- Locale: City, Large
- School district: Los Angeles Unified School District
- NCES District ID: 0622710
- NCES School ID: 062271003385
- Principal: Rodney Wright
- Teaching staff: 76.60 (on an FTE basis)
- Grades: 9–12
- Enrollment: 1,463 (2024–25)
  - Male: 791
  - Female: 672
- Student to teacher ratio: 19.10
- Colors: Navy, Columbia Blue and White
- Mascot: Spartan
- Information: (818) 833-3700
- Website: www.sylmarhs.org

Sylmar Charter High School is a charter school in the northeast San Fernando Valley in the Sylmar district of Los Angeles, California. Established in 1961, it is part of the Los Angeles Unified School District, and serves more than 1,400 students in grades 9–12. The school mascot is the Spartans.

== History ==
Sylmar first opened in 1961. Sylmar Magnet School opened September 13, 1994, serving 396 students annually. In 2016, Sylmar High School became a Charter High School.

== Athletics ==
Sylmar's athletic program has flourished in the Los Angeles City Section. Particularly in football, the Spartans have won two city titles under former head coach Jeff Engilman, in 1992 and 1994. Since then, the Spartans have had plenty of 10+ win seasons making playoffs but have fallen short of advancing to the championship games. Engilman retired from coaching in 2003 with London Woodfin, the offensive coordinator, taking over. In Woodfin's first season as head coach in 2004 the team went 9–3 and lost to Dorsey High School 55–13 in the playoffs. The closest Sylmar has gotten to making the championship game was in 2005, losing to Taft High School 48–28 in the semi-finals when Sylmar finished the season 12–1. Sylmar had running back C. J. Gable at the time. In 2014, the Sylmar football team made it to the Division 2 championship game, losing 58–31 to Hamilton High School. It has two City Division-I baseball titles: 1973 and 1980.

== Notable alumni ==
- Chuy Bravo, television personality
- Brandon Browner, football player
- Marco Estrada, baseball player
- CJ Gable, football player
- Tyler Honeycutt, basketball player
- Durell Price, football player
- Jeff Scott Soto, musician (class of 1983)
- Pete Redfern, baseball player
- Brian Roberson, football player
- Johnny Whitaker, actor (class of 1977)
- George Wrighster, football player
- Suzette Martinez Valladares, California State Assemblywoman
