= Joe Torres (baseball) =

American baseball player and coach (born 1982)

Cincinnati Reds
- Pitcher / Coach
- Born: September 3, 1982 (age 44); The Bronx, New York, U.S.

Teams
- As coach: Cleveland Guardians (2022–2026)
Medals
Men's baseball
Representing United States
World Junior Baseball Championship
Gold medal – first place	1999 Kaohsiung	Team
World Youth Baseball Championship
Gold medal – first place	1998 Fairview Heights	Team

Joseph Torres (born September 3, 1982) is an American former professional baseball pitcher and current pitching coach for the Cincinnati Reds of Major League Baseball (MLB).

== Career ==
Torres attended Gateway High School in Kissimmee, Florida. As a pitcher for the school's baseball team, he had a 1.58 earned run average (ERA) and 370 strikeouts in 198 2/3 innings pitched. As a senior, he had a 0.38 ERA with 128 strikeouts in 55 innings. Torres accepted a scholarship to play college baseball for the University of Miami.

The Anaheim Angels selected Torres in the first round, with the 10th overall selection, of the 2000 Major League Baseball draft. Torres signed with the Angels, receiving a $2.08 million signing bonus. He pitched for the Boise Hawks in 2000 after he signed. In 2002, he had a 3.52 ERA with the Cedar Rapids Kernels. He pitched 50 innings in 2003 around injuries and missed the 2004 season due to having Tommy John surgery. He struggled with Cedar Rapids and the Rancho Cucamonga Quakes in 2005. A free agent, Torres signed with the Chicago White Sox organization before the 2007 season. He played for the Birmingham Barons in 2008 and signed with the Texas Rangers organization for the 2009 season. He rejoined the Chicago White Sox organization in 2010, returning to the Birmingham Barons. His last two contracts were with the Colorado Rockies organization for the 2011, 2012 seasons, pitching for the Tulsa Drillers and Colorado Springs Sky Sox. In 2013, he complete a season in the Atlantic League splitting time pitching for the York Revolution and the Somerset Patriots.

In 2017, Torres was the pitching coach for the Arizona League Indians. He coached for the Lake County Captains in 2018 and the Lynchburg Hillcats in 2019. After the 2019 season, Cleveland named Torres their minor league pitching coordinator. He was named the assistant pitching coach on the major league staff before the 2022 season.

On November 4, 2026, the Cincinnati Reds named Torres as major league pitching coach for the 2027 season, again working alongside Reds manager Terry Francona, who previously managed the Guardians.
