= Freddie Mitchell =

American football player (born 1978)

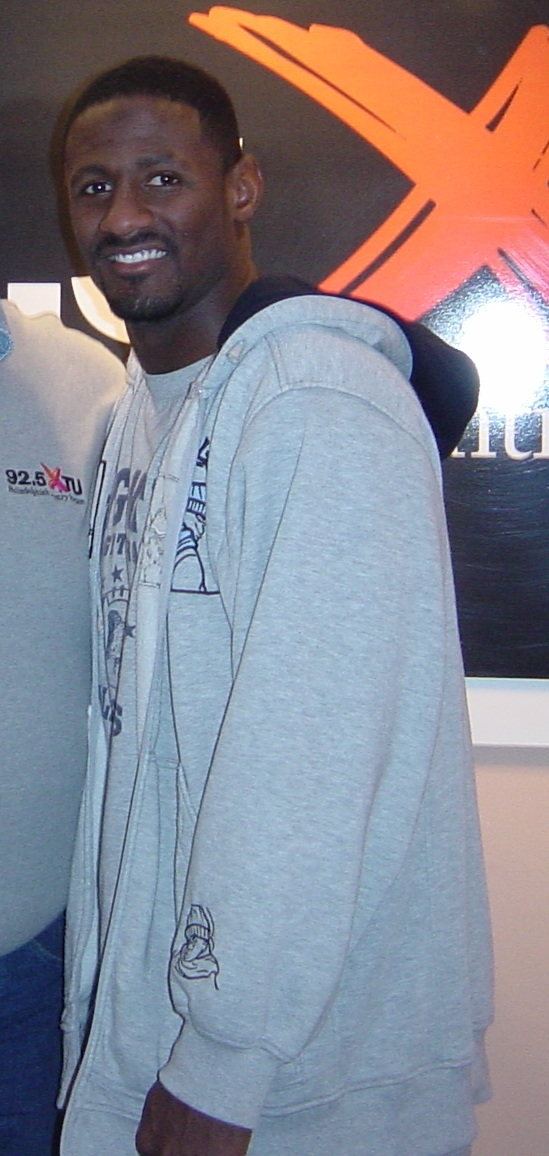
- Mitchell in 2002

No. 84
- Position: Wide receiver

Personal information
- Born: November 28, 1978 (age 47); Lakeland, Florida, U.S.
- Listed height: 5 ft 11 in (1.80 m)
- Listed weight: 184 lb (83 kg)

Career information
- High school: Kathleen (Lakeland)
- College: UCLA (1997–2000)
- NFL draft: 2001: 1st round, 25th overall pick

Career history
- Philadelphia Eagles (2001–2004); Kansas City Chiefs (2005)*
- * Offseason or practice squad member only

Awards and highlights
- Consensus All-American (2000); First-team All-Pac-10 (2000)

Career NFL statistics
- Receptions: 90
- Receiving yards: 1,263
- Receiving touchdowns: 5
- Stats at Pro Football Reference

Freddie Lee Mitchell II (born November 28, 1978) is an American former professional football player who was a wide receiver for four seasons with the Philadelphia Eagles of the National Football League (NFL). He was chosen as a consensus All-American in 2000 while playing college football for the UCLA Bruins. Philadelphia selected him in the first round of the 2001 NFL draft, and he spent four seasons as a member of the Eagles, culminating in an appearance in Super Bowl XXXIX following the 2004 NFL season.

A four-sport athlete at Kathleen High School, Mitchell committed to UCLA to play football for the Bruins. After limited play in his first two seasons due to injuries, he was a Fred Biletnikoff Award finalist in 2000 and earned first-team All-Pacific-10 Conference (Pac-10) honors at the conclusion of the season. He also helped lead the team to the 2000 Sun Bowl, where he had nine catches for a Sun Bowl record of 180 yards.

Mitchell was selected by the Eagles with the 25th selection in the first round of the 2001 NFL draft. Mitchell alternated between a fourth and slot receiver during his first three seasons. In the 2003 NFC Divisional Playoff Game against the Green Bay Packers, with the Eagles facing a 4th and 26 situation, he caught a 28-yard pass from Donovan McNabb to help lead the team to a win in overtime.

The presence of Terrell Owens in 2004 led to limited opportunities for Mitchell to catch passes and he showed his frustration on and off the field. When Owens went down with an ankle injury towards the end of the season, Mitchell replaced him as the starter and had a two-touchdown performance in the Divisional Playoff Game against the Minnesota Vikings. In the week prior to Super Bowl XXXIX against the New England Patriots, he created controversy by offending members of the Patriots' secondary, including Rodney Harrison. He caught one pass for 11 yards in the Super Bowl and was released by the Eagles on May 6, 2005. The Kansas City Chiefs signed him shortly after, but he declined to have arthroscopic surgery on his injured knee and he was released before the start of the season.

After his NFL career ended, Mitchell bought a barbecue restaurant in Lakeland in 2008, but the venue was closed in September 2009. Mitchell served time in prison for tax fraud from 2013 to 2016.

== Early life ==
Mitchell grew up as the son of a pastor in Lakeland, Florida. He attended Kathleen High School in Lakeland, where he lettered in cross country, baseball, football, and basketball. In baseball, Mitchell was used as a pinch hitter and played outfield. He played in the Polk County East–West Senior All-Star Game in 1997 for the West squad. He had a .388 batting average, three home runs, and eleven runs batted in (RBI). Mitchell was drafted by the Tampa Bay Devil Rays in the 47th round of the 1997 Major League Baseball draft after graduating from Kathleen. He had brief contract negotiations with the Devil Rays, but decided to attend college instead of signing with a professional team. He was a guard in basketball, and scored 11 points in the 1997 Class 4A boys' high school basketball state championship for Kathleen as the Red Devils won their first ever title. Mitchell, who had three steals in the game, was called for a technical foul after he went out-of-bounds and punched a cooler. In football, he contributed as a wide receiver, kick returner, punt returner, holder for kicker Paul Edinger, and defensive back. Mitchell earned The Ledger second-team all-Lakeland area honors as a utility player following the 1995 season.

Mitchell visited the University of Florida, Florida State University, the University of Miami, and Michigan State University before he committed to the University of California, Los Angeles to play football for the Bruins. He chose to play on the West Coast mainly because of the opportunities presented for his career after football.

== College career ==
While attending the University of California, Los Angeles, Mitchell played for the UCLA Bruins football team from 1997 to 2000. He sat out the 1997 season by taking a redshirt and subsequently lengthening his college football eligibility. In his first game, a 49–31 win over Texas on September 12, 1998, Mitchell threw a 34-yard touchdown pass to Brian Poli-Dixon and had four catches for 108 yards and one touchdown pass (79 yards) from quarterback Cade McNown. He had one rushing attempt for 30 yards on a reverse, 78 yards on three kickoff returns, and 17 yards on three punt returns. He was named the Pacific-10 Conference Offensive Player of the Week for his efforts in the game. On September 19, Mitchell had surgery on his left femur after suffering a fracture at the end of a kickoff return in the first quarter of a 42–24 win over Houston the same day. Mitchell was expected to miss the rest of the season. However, after a "remarkable" recovery, according to a member of the UCLA medical staff, Mitchell was able to play for eleven snaps in the Rose Bowl on January 1, 1999. He threw a 61-yard touchdown pass to Durell Price on a flea flicker play in the first quarter of the loss to Wisconsin.

In the summer prior to the 1999 season, Mitchell and Poli-Dixon trained with Minnesota Vikings receivers Randy Moss and Cris Carter in Florida. Mitchell, Poli-Dixon, Danny Farmer, and the rest of the UCLA receiving corps called themselves "The Birds" for their ability to "fly all over the field". Mitchell was hampered by a knee cartilage issue throughout his redshirt sophomore season. In his first career start, replacing the injured Farmer in the season-opener against Boise State, Mitchell had one catch for 11 yards from Drew Bennett, one kickoff return for 15 yards, and four punt returns for 33 yards. In the next week in a loss against the Ohio State Buckeyes, Mitchell again started in place of Farmer and gained 31 yards on two reverses, had four kickoff returns for 73 yards and completed a pass for 18 yards. In a 35–21 win over Fresno State on September 18, Mitchell, again starting in place of Farmer, caught nine passes for 149 yards, both career-highs. Mitchell caught 10 passes for 103 total yards in the next four games. He led the team in receiving for three consecutive weeks to follow: in his sixth start of the season, a 55–7 blowout loss to Oregon State, he caught five passes for 58 yards; in the Bruins' third-straight loss, this time to Arizona, he had 42 yards on four receptions; and in a 23–20 win in overtime against Washington, he successfully received four passes for 82 yards, including a 43-yard pass from Ryan McCann. In the final game of the season, against USC, Mitchell caught five passes for 88 yards. He had a total of 38 catches for 533 yards with no touchdowns and six starts in 1999, and finished 15th in the Pac-10 in receptions with 3.5 per game and 17th in receiving yards with 48.5 per game.

Mitchell played baseball for the Bruins in the offseason prior to the 2000 football season. He was teammates with future Philadelphia Phillies second baseman Chase Utley and introduced Utley to his future wife, Jennifer Cooper. Mitchell was drafted in the 2000 Major League Baseball draft in the 50th round by the Chicago White Sox. Utley said of Mitchell's decision not to play baseball professionally, "he chose the right sport in football, that's for sure. He was a good batting practice hitter—that's about it. He wasn't quite the same once the game got going." The Bruins earned the Pac-10 Conference Championship with Mitchell as a member in 2000.

Mitchell earned preseason first-team All-Pac-10 honors from The Sporting News and Lindy's Sports before the 2000 season as he prepared to take over the starting wide receiver job following Farmer's graduation. Mitchell, along with teammate Poli-Dixon, was named to the Fred Biletnikoff Award watchlist for the outstanding receiver in college football during the preseason. In the season-opener against third-ranked Alabama, Mitchell threw a 31-yard touchdown pass to Poli-Dixon on a trick play in the first quarter and made a 46-yard touchdown reception from McCann in the third quarter. He finished the game with four catches for 91 yards in the upset win. In the 24–21 win over Fresno State on September 9, Mitchell led the team in receiving with six receptions for 58 yards and a 20-yard touchdown pass from McCann. Mitchell's catches went into the double-digits against third-ranked Michigan, as he had ten receptions for 137 yards in the 23–20 upset win on September 16. On September 23, in the third quarter of a 29–10 loss against Oregon, Mitchell caught what appeared to be a touchdown in the corner of the end zone, but was ruled out-of-bounds by the officials. The Bruins settled for a field goal on the drive and Mitchell explained after the game that "I knew it was a touchdown, you knew it was a touchdown, everybody does. The ref[eree] knew it too because he looked at me like he was sorry." On the next series, however, Mitchell caught a 54-yard touchdown pass from backup quarterback Bennett. Mitchell finished the game with eight receptions for 158 yards. In a 38–31 comeback win over Arizona State on September 30, he caught two touchdown passes from Cory Paus in the third quarter, one of which was for 80 yards, and had four total catches for 125 yards in the game. On October 14, in a triple-overtime loss to California, Mitchell made eight receptions for 167 yards and caught a 35-yard touchdown from Paus in the fourth quarter.

Mitchell was named to the BCSfootball.com Midseason All-America team after posting 38 receptions for 736 yards and six touchdowns midway through the season. Over the next four games, Mitchell recorded 26 catches for 438 yards, including a seven-catch, 185-yard game against Stanford on November 4. He caught a 41-yard touchdown pass from Paus in the game. In a 38–35 loss to USC on November 18, Mitchell broke Farmer's single-season record of 1,274 yards in 1998 with 1,314 yards. He made four receptions for 140 yards and a four-yard touchdown in the game, and threw a 45-yard touchdown pass to Poli-Dixon. Mitchell was named a semi-finalist for the Biletnikoff Award in late October. He was named a finalist for the award in late November alongside Antonio Bryant of Pittsburgh and Marvin Minnis of Florida State, but lost out to Bryant. Mitchell earned first-team All-America honors by the Walter Camp Football Foundation following the season, as well as first-team All-Pac-10 honors. He earned CNNSI.com honorable mention All-America honors. He was named a winner of UCLA's Henry R. "Red" Sanders Award for Most Valuable Player, the winner of the George W. Dickerson Award for Outstanding Offensive Player against USC, and a winner of the Team Captain Award at the UCLA football award banquet.

In the 2000 Sun Bowl against Wisconsin on December 29, Mitchell made nine receptions for a Sun Bowl-record 180 yards, including a 64-yard touchdown catch. Though the Bruins lost the game 21–20, Mitchell said Badgers cornerback Jamar Fletcher "couldn't stop [him]." Mitchell was called for two taunting penalties on Fletcher, but still won MVP honors following the game. Mitchell finished the season with 77 catches for 1,494 yards and nine touchdowns.

In October 2000, Mitchell told the Eugene Register-Guard, a newspaper in Eugene, Oregon, that he was "definitely returning" for his senior season. By mid-November, however, he told the Associated Press that he was "leaning to staying, but nothing's firm." Mitchell instead chose to forgo his senior year and entered the NFL draft in early January 2001. He stated, "I have had a great time, but it's time for me to give something back to my family." Mitchell said he would be quieter in the NFL: "You won't hear no more trash talking from Freddie Mitchell, those are the big boys, I'm just a little kid again. I'm humble." He had 119 catches for 2,135 yards and 10 touchdowns in his career as a Bruin.

== Professional career ==
=== Pre-draft ===
After Mitchell declared for the 2001 NFL draft, one NFL scout told the Milwaukee Journal-Sentinel in February, "I don't think he's as fast as people in the press try to say he is. He's absolutely fearless over the middle but he prefers to trap the ball instead of to extend for it. I don't think he has nearly the explosion to be considered a first." Mitchell was also criticized by scouts for his small frame and potential character issues. Draft analyst Mel Kiper, Jr. rated Mitchell as the 16th-best prospect in the draft following the NFL Scouting Combine in which he ran a 4.4-second 40-yard dash, and called him a player on the rise. Kiper also rated him as the fifth-best wide receiver in the draft and projected Mitchell to be drafted in the mid-first round following his performance at the Combine. In rating players several times leading up to the draft, Kiper re-watched game film of each player and adjusted their rankings accordingly. In his March 5 mock draft, Kiper projected Mitchell to be drafted by the Green Bay Packers with the tenth overall selection. He ranked Mitchell as the 18th-best player in the draft on March 30. NFLDraftScout.com projected Mitchell to be drafted in the second round and rated him as the eighth-best wide receiver in the draft. Kiper ranked him the fourth-best wide receiver in the draft on April 2. In his April 10 mock draft, Kiper projected Mitchell to be drafted by the Denver Broncos with the 24th overall selection. Ed Bouchette of the Pittsburgh Post-Gazette ranked Mitchell as the sixth-best wide receiver in the draft. Mitchell hired Tom Condon of IMG Football as his agent leading up to the draft.

Pre-draft measurables
Height	Weight	Arm length	Hand span	40-yard dash	10-yard split	20-yard split	20-yard shuttle	Three-cone drill	Vertical jump	Broad jump
5 ft 11 3/8 in (1.81 m)	185 lb (84 kg)	31 in (0.79 m)	8 1/2 in (0.22 m)	4.46 s	1.57 s	2.53 s	4.06 s	6.95 s	39.5 in (1.00 m)	10 ft 0 in (3.05 m)
All values from 2001 NFL Scouting Combine.

=== Philadelphia Eagles ===
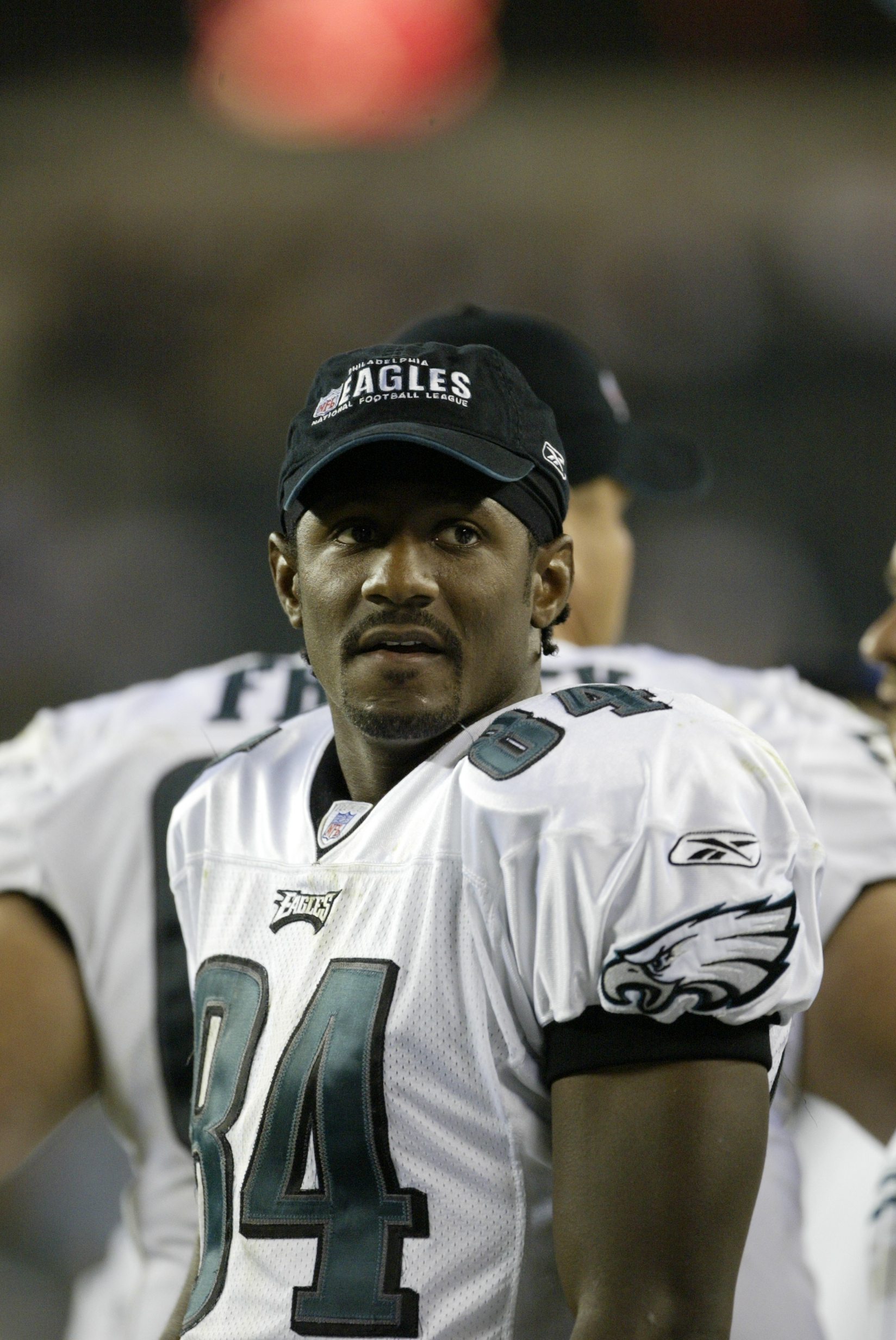
Mitchell in a 2004 preseason game

==== 2001 season ====
Mitchell was selected by the Philadelphia Eagles in the first round (25th overall) of the 2001 NFL draft. He was the fifth wide receiver taken in the draft. He worked out with his new quarterback Donovan McNabb in Arizona and Los Angeles before mini-camp started. Because of NCAA rules regarding graduation, Mitchell was unable to attend the Eagles' mini-camp until after UCLA's senior class graduated. He studied the Eagles' playbook in the meantime. He asked the NFL for an exemption, but the league refused, and he arrived for his first practice on June 18, 2001. Mitchell signed a five-year, $5.5 million contract with the Eagles on July 26, in time for the start of training camp. During training camp, Mitchell practiced as a backup behind James Thrash and Todd Pinkston. Special teams coordinator John Harbaugh asked Mitchell if he was willing to practice as a kickoff returner in practice, but Mitchell declined, citing the fracture of his femur on a kickoff return in college. Nonetheless, he still practiced on the kickoff coverage team, and on the punt coverage team as a gunner. Mitchell suffered a hip pointer during the morning session on July 31, but returned for the afternoon session without limitation. A hamstring injury limited him at the end of training camp. Before the start of the 2001 season, head coach Andy Reid said, "Mentally, [Mitchell is] right there. He's picked everything up, he's a smart kid. He's wide-eyed, ready to learn. He's done a nice job when he's been in there."

Mitchell began the season as the team's fourth wide receiver behind Thrash, Pinkston, and Na Brown. Mitchell's difficulty in learning the complex playbook, as well as the lingering hamstring injury, limited him in the Eagles' first six games of the season. In his first career NFL game, a week one matchup against the St. Louis Rams on September 9, Mitchell played in a few snaps but was not thrown to. Mitchell was listed as "questionable" due to his hamstring injury before the start of the week two game against the Seattle Seahawks on September 23, and was not activated. Against the Dallas Cowboys in week three on September 30, Mitchell returned to the field and caught his first pass, which went for no gain. In weeks four and six, against the Arizona Cardinals and New York Giants, respectively, Mitchell recorded no catches. In week seven against the Oakland Raiders, he made a catch for 15 yards.

Due to Brown's ineffective play, Mitchell replaced him as the Eagles' slot receiver in week eight against the Cardinals and had four receptions for 62 yards. In a week nine game against the Minnesota Vikings on November 11, Mitchell caught three passes for 38 yards and had one rushing attempt for 12 yards. He caught two passes for 15 yards and had one rush for a loss of 16 yards in week ten against the Cowboys. Mitchell was listed as "probable" on the team's injury report due to a shoulder injury before a week eleven game against the Washington Redskins, but did not record any catches in the game. He made three receptions for 60 yards in a week twelve win over the Kansas City Chiefs on November 29, and Reid said, "Every week we're giving Freddie a little bit more responsibility and he's coming along very well right now." In a week thirteen game against the San Diego Chargers, Mitchell caught one pass for five yards and attempted a pass off of a reverse that was knocked down. Against Washington in week 14, Mitchell caught his first career touchdown pass, a four-yard reception in the second quarter. He had two catches for 27 yards in the game. Mitchell caught two passes in each of the next two games for a total of 61 yards.

Mitchell made his first two career starts in week seventeen and in a wild card playoff game win against the Buccaneers. He did not record any receptions in either game. Against the Chicago Bears in a divisional playoff game win on January 19, Mitchell caught two passes for 14 yards. In the NFC Championship Game against the Rams on January 27, Mitchell caught one pass for two yards. A pass intended for him on a fourth-down play was intercepted by Rams defensive back Aeneas Williams to clinch the win for St. Louis. Mitchell finished the season with 21 receptions for 283 yards and one touchdown.

==== 2002 season ====
After the Eagles signed Antonio Freeman to a one-year contract in August 2002, Mitchell was demoted to the fourth wide receiver behind Pinkston, Thrash, and Freeman. Mitchell mainly contributed on special teams for the Eagles throughout the 2002 season. In the first fifteen weeks of the season, Mitchell caught a total of six passes for 53 yards as a backup. Against the Cowboys in week sixteen, Pinkston left the game due to turf toe, and Mitchell caught two passes for 17 yards in his place. Mitchell started in place of Pinkston in the last regular season game against the Giants on December 28, and led the team in receiving with four catches for 35 yards.

Mitchell only caught twelve passes for 105 yards over the entire season. It was after this dismal performance, despite having the benefit of Pro Bowl quarterback Donovan McNabb passing to him, that Mitchell began to be labeled as a "bust."

==== 2003 season ====
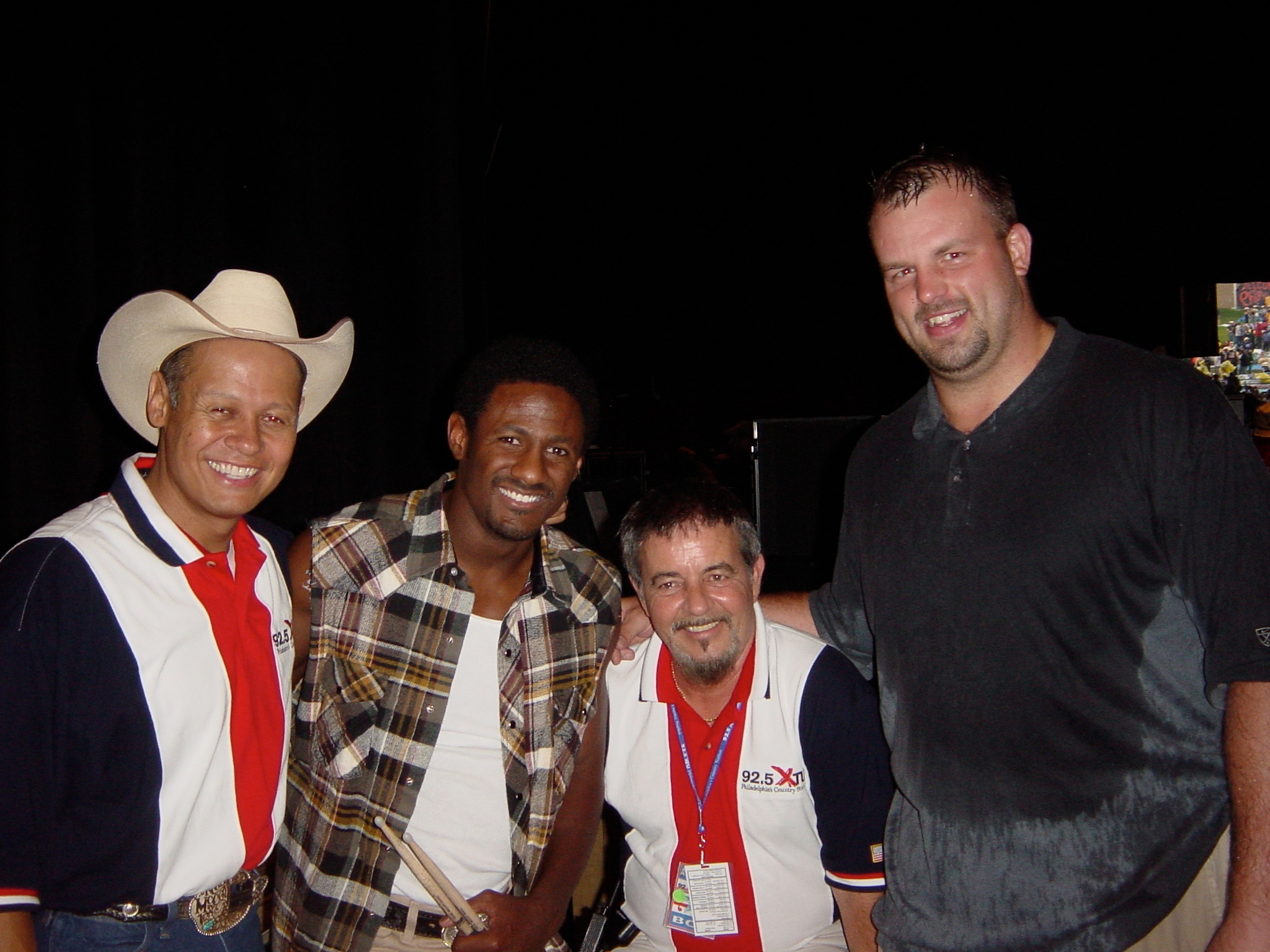
Mitchell (second from left) backstage at a country music concert in May 2003 with country singer Neal McCoy (far left) and Eagles teammate Jon Runyan (far right)

Mitchell competed with rookie Billy McMullen for the third wide receiver position in 2003 after Freeman left the Eagles following the 2002 season. He eventually beat out McMullen for the slot receiver job. Eagles staff, players, and media called Mitchell one of the most improved players in training camp. Donovan McNabb commented that Mitchell's "offseason workouts as well as his mindset has been a whole lot different".

In the first four weeks of the season, Mitchell caught six passes for 55 yards. Mitchell had one catch for 29 yards against the Redskins on October 5, and he recovered a Redskins onside kick to clinch the win for the Eagles. He had one reception for 27 yards in a game against the Cowboys in week six. Mitchell started in week seven in place of Pinkston against the Giants but recorded no catches. Against the New York Jets in week eight, he had two catches for 29 yards. In week nine against the Atlanta Falcons, Mitchell caught a 37-yard touchdown pass from McNabb and finished with two catches for 43 yards. He made seven receptions in the next two games for 83 yards. Against the New Orleans Saints in week twelve, Mitchell started and made two receptions for 24 yards. In weeks thirteen and fourteen, he had a combined six catches for 98 yards. On December 15, in a week fifteen game against the Miami Dolphins, Mitchell threw his first touchdown pass, a 25-yard pass to Brian Westbrook, and caught two passes for 30 yards in the 34–27 win. Against the San Francisco 49ers in week sixteen on December 21, Mitchell made two catches for 23 yards and caught an eight-yard touchdown pass in the second quarter of a week seventeen game against the Redskins on December 27. He had four catches for 47 yards in the game.

Mitchell's most significant play, according to Philadelphia media and fans, came on January 11, 2004, in the NFC Divisional Playoff Game against the Packers. Late in the game, with the Eagles losing by three points and facing a 4th and 26 situation, Mitchell caught a 28-yard pass for a first down. The Eagles tied the score on the same drive and won the game in overtime. Mitchell had another catch for nine yards in the game. In the NFC Championship Game on January 18 against the Carolina Panthers, he caught four passes for 38 yards in the loss. Mitchell had 35 catches for 498 yards and two touchdowns in 2003.

==== 2004 season ====
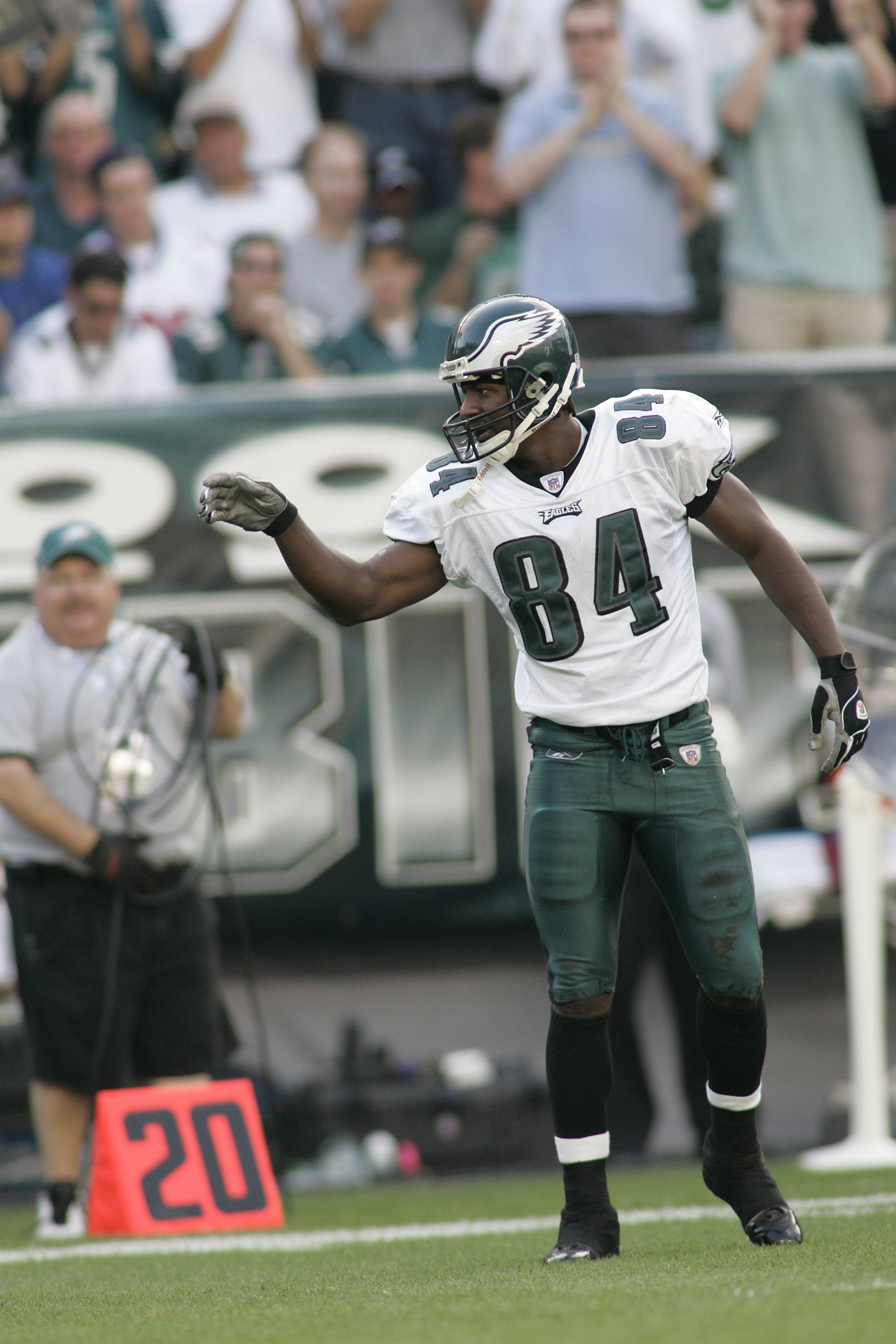
Mitchell in a game against the New York Giants on September 12, 2004

With the Eagles' acquisition of wide receiver Terrell Owens and the departure of Thrash, Mitchell kept his role as the slot receiver in 2004. Peter King said Mitchell had "a great training camp" and that he "might be having the best camp of any player I've seen this summer." He made seven receptions in the first four weeks of the season for a total of 118 yards receiving, including three catches for 71 yards against the Detroit Lions in week three. He started against the Panthers on October 17 in week six but did not record any catches. In the following three weeks, Mitchell only had two receptions for 31 yards, with both catches coming against the Cleveland Browns in week seven. His most notable catch of the season was a 60-yard reception during the Eagles' November 15, 2004, Monday Night Football game against the Cowboys. This catch is remembered primarily for the manner in which McNabb extended the play by eluding the Cowboys' pass rush for 14.1 seconds before eventually throwing to Mitchell. Over the subsequent four weeks, Mitchell had one reception in each game for a combined 54 yards. He began to openly voice his frustration over the limited role he continued to play in the Eagles' offense due to Owens' prominence. At one point during the season, after he made a catch, Mitchell would point to his wrist as if to say "it's about time." In a week fifteen game against the Cowboys, Owens suffered an ankle injury and was expected to miss the remainder of the season. Mitchell, who suffered a quad contusion during the game, did not make a catch against Dallas, but was named the starter in Owens' place opposite Pinkston. Against the Rams in week sixteen, Mitchell caught a seven-yard touchdown pass from McNabb in the first quarter and finished the game with two receptions for 28 yards. In the final game of the regular season against the Cincinnati Bengals, Mitchell had six receptions for 76 yards and a touchdown. He finished the season with only 22 catches.

In a divisional playoff game against the Vikings on January 16, 2005, Mitchell caught a two-yard touchdown pass in the first quarter and celebrated by feigning to pull his pants up, a reference to the touchdown celebration by Vikings' wide receiver Randy Moss, who pretended to pull his pants down to moon Green Bay fans the week before and was heavily criticized for doing so. Mitchell recovered an L. J. Smith fumble in the endzone for a touchdown in the second quarter, and finished the game with a team-high five receptions for 65 yards. In a press conference after the game, Mitchell said, "I just want to thank my hands for being so great." He had two receptions for 20 yards against the Atlanta Falcons in the NFC Championship Game on January 23. In the game, Mitchell sported a well-publicized frohawk.

===== Super Bowl controversy =====
The Eagles finished the 2004 season with a 13–3 record and earned a trip to Super Bowl XXXIX, where they were to play the AFC champion New England Patriots. During the week leading up to the game, Mitchell sat for a short ESPN interview conducted by Dan Patrick. Asked to identify the members of the Patriots' secondary, Mitchell claimed he did not know them by name, only by number, and then deliberately stated each of their numbers incorrectly. Finally, he said he "had something" for safety Rodney Harrison. Harrison responded by calling Mitchell a "jerk". Mitchell caught only one pass for 11 yards in the 24–21 loss. By the end of the game, Harrison, who recorded two interceptions in the Super Bowl, had caught more of McNabb's passes than Mitchell had. The normally tight-lipped Patriots head coach Bill Belichick later said of Mitchell, "[a]ll he does is talk. He's terrible, and you can print that. I was happy when he was in the game." After the Super Bowl, Mitchell continued to criticize the Patriots, as well as Belichick, saying that the way the Patriots reacted reminded him of "little girls".

=== Later career ===
Mitchell held out from the Eagles' mini-camp in late April 2005, with Andy Reid stating, "I did not want him here." Mitchell was released from the team on May 6. He finished his career with the Eagles with 90 receptions for 1,263 yards and five touchdowns.

Mitchell worked out for the Kansas City Chiefs on June 6, 2005, following his release from the Eagles. He signed with the Chiefs on June 17 after Az-Zahir Hakim decided against signing with the team. Mitchell did not receive a signing bonus. He began practicing with the team on the last day of mini-camps, June 18, and received extra practice with the coaches the following week. He suffered a knee injury during practice on July 30 and was scheduled to undergo arthroscopic surgery the following week, but declined to go through with it. He was released on September 2 due to concerns about his knee. Mitchell elected to have knee surgery on September 6 following his release.

Mitchell worked out for several teams after his release from the Chiefs, but did not sign a contract with any of them. He worked out for the Green Bay Packers on October 25, 2005, the Dallas Cowboys on August 6, 2006, the Cleveland Browns on October 11, 2006, the Toronto Argonauts of the Canadian Football League on February 11, 2007, the Tennessee Titans on July 26, 2007, and the Baltimore Ravens on May 29, 2008. The Philadelphia Soul of the Arena Football League expressed interest in signing Mitchell in January 2006, but president Ron Jaworski, a former Eagles quarterback, had difficulties contacting him.

== NFL career statistics ==
Legend
**Bold**	Career high

Regular season statistics
Year	Team	Games		Receiving					
Year	Team	GP	GS	Tgt	Rec	Yds	Avg	Lng	TD
2001	PHI	15	1	43	21	283	13.5	29	1
2002	PHI	**16**	1	24	12	105	8.8	18	0
2003	PHI	**16**	6	**59**	**35**	**498**	14.2	39	**2**
2004	PHI	**16**	**9**	45	22	377	**17.1**	**60**	**2**
		63	17	171	90	1,263	14.0	60	5

Postseason statistics
Year	Team	Games		Receiving					
Year	Team	GP	GS	Tgt	Rec	Yds	Avg	Lng	TD
2001	PHI	**3**	1	7	3	16	5.3	8	0
2002	PHI	2	0	1	0	0	0.0	0	0
2003	PHI	2	0	11	6	75	**12.5**	28	0
2004	PHI	**3**	**2**	**15**	**8**	**96**	12.0	**30**	**1**
		10	3	34	17	187	11.0	30	1

== Personal life ==
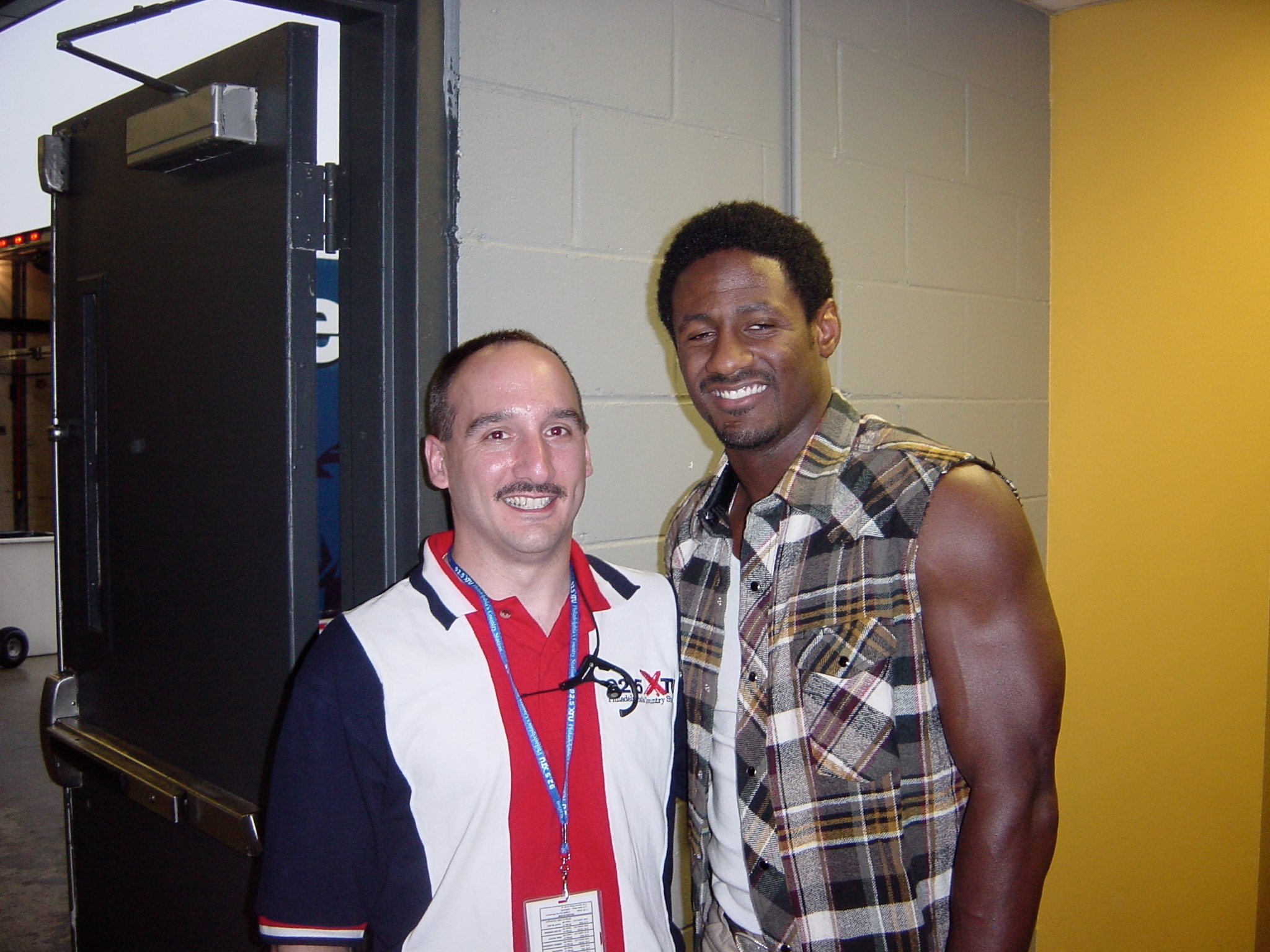
Mitchell (right) in 2003

Mitchell's first cousin is former running back Rod Smart, who played on the Eagles with Mitchell in 2001. Mitchell enjoys country music. Mitchell had several nicknames during his tenure in Philadelphia. These included "Fast Freddie," the "Sultan of Slot," "First Down Freddie," "FredEx" (claiming he "always delivers"), the "People's Champ," and "Hollywood." While with the Eagles, Mitchell was a resident of Moorestown, New Jersey.

Mitchell appeared on The Tonight Show with Jay Leno while on UCLA's campus, deliberately answering questions incorrectly. He appeared on A Dating Story, a reality television show, in May 2002. In the episode, Mitchell took Tiffany Schmid, a model in the Philadelphia area, to Great Adventure Amusement Park for their date. Mitchell, as well as several other NFL players, received threatening hate mail in 2003, apparently due to his appearance on the reality show with Schmid as a mixed-race couple at the time. In January 2011, Mitchell appeared on Bravo's The Millionaire Matchmaker, a dating show in which Patti Stanger sets millionaires up to find love. Mitchell's fiancée left him after Super Bowl XXXIX in February 2005 after they had been together for two years.

In 2008, Mitchell returned to Lakeland and bought a local barbecue restaurant called "Brothers' Bar-B-Que." In February 2009, Mitchell was under investigation when a package containing 7 pounds (3.2 kg) of marijuana was delivered to his business. Mitchell was briefly detained, but was not charged. The restaurant was closed briefly in June for violations, but reopened shortly thereafter. On September 3, 2009, the restaurant was closed and Mitchell was named in a suit for failure to make payments on the business. Mitchell officially lost the restaurant in September 2009 after a court ruling. In December 2009, Mitchell was pulled over for speeding in suburban Philadelphia. Due to an outstanding warrant for failure to pay child support, he was arrested on charges of being a fugitive from justice, and was later released on $250,000 bail.

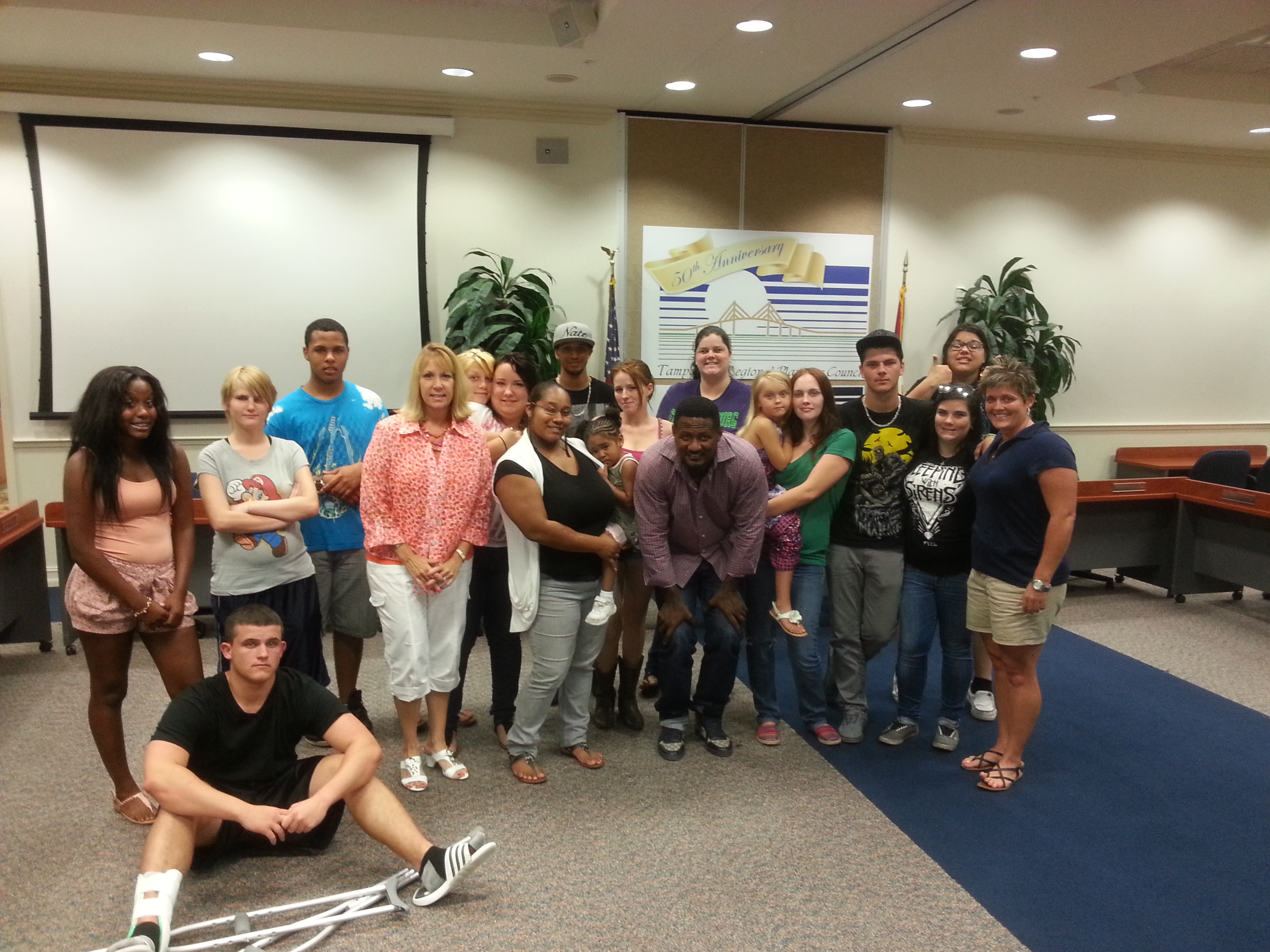
Mitchell during one of his Ready For Life charitable appearances

Mitchell turned himself in to authorities on March 12, 2012, after being indicted on federal tax fraud charges. He was arraigned on March 22 on the charges, and a warrant for his arrest in Indiana for failure to pay child support led to his incarceration in Orange County, Florida. In May 2012, Mitchell filed a lawsuit against a married couple, who were defendants in his previous charges, citing fraud, breach of contract, and intentional infliction of emotional distress. Mitchell pleaded guilty on March 8, 2013, to one count of conspiring to file a false tax claim with the federal government. At a hearing on October 24, 2013, in Orlando, Florida, he claimed that his crime stemmed from concussions he suffered during his career in the NFL, adding that he had headaches, insomnia, and memory loss. That memory loss was cited as a possible reason for his failing to pay child support in that case as well. His attorneys asked the judge in the case that Mitchell only be sentenced to community service and probation. On October 29, 2013, he was sentenced to serve 37 months in prison. He began his sentence on December 6, 2013.

On May 4, 2012, Mitchell participated in a charity golfing event to benefit the Palm Beach State College Foundation. He rang the ceremonial Liberty Bell in Philadelphia before the start of a National Basketball Association game between the Philadelphia 76ers and Toronto Raptors on December 22, 2018.

In September 2021, Mitchell was affected by Hurricane Ida, after his home was flooded.
