= Durell Price =

American football player (born 1978)

Profile
- Positions: Running back, fullback

Personal information
- Born: March 25, 1978 (age 48); Pasadena, California
- Listed height: 6 ft 0 in (1.83 m)
- Listed weight: 234 lb (106 kg)

Career information
- High school: Sylmar (Los Angeles, California)
- College: UCLA Bruins (1996–1999)

Durell Price was a football player for the UCLA Bruins and Sylmar High School Spartans between 1993 and 1999. Despite being highly regarded out of college, he was never drafted and did not make it to the NFL except for a short stint with the San Diego Chargers in 2000.

== High school ==
Durell was a major component of the heyday of Jeff Engileman's powerhouse Sylmar High School's dominance of the City Section. In 1994 and 1995, he was named 4A City player of the year and team MVP, and lead the Spartans to a 1994 City Championship with a 38-6 win over Crenshaw. In the game, he had 166 yards on 19 carries, with 3 touchdowns. He set career Sylmar High records of 4,144 yards and 78 touchdowns.

== UCLA ==
Price's college signing led to the most notable incident of fax machine failure in National Letter of Intent history. He faxed his letter of intent to Ohio State University from a local drugstore, only to realize that he did not want to attend college so far from home. Although Price believed that his choice was already made, he learned that his fax had not been transmitted properly. The next day, he signed with UCLA.

At UCLA he played as a running back and did get some touches at running back his freshman year, 1996, including a career-high 110 yard rushing game verses Northeast Louisiana University (now known as UL-Monroe). In 1997, he switched to fullback, and saw little time. It was not until his junior year in 1998 when he became a starter at fullback. The highlight of his career, undoubtedly, was a 61 yard touchdown, on a trick pass play from wide receiver Freddie Mitchell, in the 1999 Rose Bowl. He changed his number each season, increasing the number each time.

He was of 14 UCLA football players charged with illegally obtaining handicapped parking passes.

== Stats ==
| Year | Att | Yards | TD | Long | Rec | Yards | TD | Long |
|---|---|---|---|---|---|---|---|---|
| 1995 (Sr, SHS) | | 1,666 | 36 | | | | | |
| 1996 (Fr, UCLA) | 61 | 210 | 0 | 28 | 3 | 3 | 0 | 2 |
| 1997 (So, UCLA) | 12 | 36 | 0 | 7 | 5 | 48 | 0 | 24 |
| 1998 (Jr, UCLA) | 33 | 141 | 0 | 40 | 14 | 222 | 1 | 61 |
| 1999 (Sr, UCLA) | 16 | 46 | 0 | 9 | 6 | 85 | 0 | 34 |
