= Moses Regular =

American football player (born 1971)

No. 86, 89
- Position: Linebacker

Personal information
- Born: October 30, 1971 (age 55); Miami, Florida, U.S.
- Listed height: 6 ft 3 in (1.91 m)
- Listed weight: 255 lb (116 kg)

Career information
- High school: Gateway (Kissimmee, Florida)
- College: Missouri Valley (1992–1995)
- NFL draft: 1996: undrafted

Career history
- New York Giants (1996); Jacksonville Jaguars (1996)*; St. Louis Rams (1997)*; Frankfurt Galaxy (1998)
- * Offseason or practice squad member only
- Stats at Pro Football Reference

Moses Regular Jr. (born October 30, 1971) is an American former professional football linebacker who played one season with the New York Giants of the National Football League (NFL). He played college football at Missouri Valley College. He was also a member of the Frankfurt Galaxy of NFL Europe.

== Early life and college ==
Moses Regular Jr. was born on October 30, 1971, in Miami, Florida. He played high school football at Gateway High School in Kissimmee, Florida as a linebacker and tight end. He led the team in tackles and receptions as a senior, earning all-conference honors at linebacker.

He played college football for the Missouri Valley Vikings from 1992 to 1995 as an inside and outside linebacker. He garnered All-HAAC recognition all four seasons.

== Professional career ==
After going undrafted in the 1996 NFL draft, Regular signed with the New York Giants on April 27, 1996, as a linebacker. He played in three games for the Giants during the 1996 season before being released on October 25, 1996.

Regular was signed to the practice squad of the Jacksonville Jaguars on November 27, 1996. He became a free agent after the season.

Regular was signed by the St. Louis Rams on February 13, 1997. He converted to tight end/long snapper with the Rams. He was released later in 1997.

He played for the Frankfurt Galaxy of NFL Europe in 1998, recording one special teams tackle.
