= Jeremiah Wilson (American football) =

American football player (born 2004)

Profile
- Position: Cornerback

Personal information
- Born: February 18, 2004 (age 22); Chicago, Illinois, U.S.
- Listed height: 5 ft 10 in (1.78 m)
- Listed weight: 178 lb (81 kg)

Career information
- High school: Osceola (Kissimmee, Florida)
- College: Syracuse (2022–2023); Houston (2024); Florida State (2025)
- NFL draft: 2026: undrafted

Career history
- Los Angeles Chargers (2026)*
- * Offseason or practice squad member only

Jeremiah Wilson (born February 18, 2004) is an American football cornerback. He played college football for the Florida State Seminoles, Houston Cougars, and for the Syracuse Orange.

== Early life ==
Wilson attended Osceola High School in Kissimmee, Florida. He was rated as a three-star recruit by 247Sports and committed to play college football for the Syracuse Orange over offers from other schools such as Coastal Carolina, Iowa State, Arkansas State, and Colorado State.

== College career ==
=== Syracuse ===
As a freshman in 2022, Wilson appeared in all 12 games, notching 21 tackles. He entered the NCAA transfer portal after the season, but later withdrew his name and returned to the Orange for the 2023 season. In 2023, Wilson tallied 16 tackles with one going for a loss, five pass deflections, and an interception which he returned for a touchdown. After the season, he entered the NCAA transfer portal.

=== Houston ===
Wilson transferred to play for the Houston Cougars. In week 2 of the 2024 season, he recorded an interception in a loss to Oklahoma. Wilson finished the season with 16 tackles, four interceptions, and four pass deflections. After the conclusion of the season, he once again entered the NCAA transfer portal.

=== Florida State ===
Wilson transferred to play for the Florida State Seminoles. In 2025, he played in all 12 games, recording 42 tackles with one being for a loss, three pass deflections, and three interceptions.

== Professional career ==
Pre-draft measurables
Height	Weight	Arm length	Hand span	Wingspan	40-yard dash	10-yard split	20-yard split	Vertical jump	Broad jump	Bench press
5 ft 10 1/2 in (1.79 m)	178 lb (81 kg)	29 3/4 in (0.76 m)	8 5/8 in (0.22 m)	5 ft 10 3/8 in (1.79 m)	4.41 s	1.52 s	2.53 s	32.5 in (0.83 m)	9 ft 9 in (2.97 m)	17 reps
All values from Pro Day

After not being selected in the 2026 NFL draft, Wilson signed with the Los Angeles Chargers as an undrafted free agent. He was waived with an injury designation on May 12, 2026, and reverted to injured reserve the following day.
