= Liberty High School (Kissimmee, Florida) =

Coordinates: 28.166017°N 81.44018°W

Location
- 4250 Pleasant Hill Road; Kissimmee, Florida 34746; United States

Information
- School district: Osceola County
- Principal: La Tonia Harris
- Staff: 82.50 (FTE)
- Grades: 9-12
- Enrollment: 1,969 (2019-20)
- Student to teacher ratio: 19.55
- Language: English
- Hours in school day: 7:15am – 2:10pm 7:15am – 1:10pm (Wednesdays)
- Campus type: Suburban
- Color
- Athletics: Yes
- Athletics conference: Orange Belt Conference
- Sports: Yes
- Mascot: Charger
- Website: https://lbhs.osceolaschools.net/

Liberty High School is located in unincorporated Osceola County, Florida, near Kissimmee. It is in the School District of Osceola County, Florida.

== Special programs ==
=== Advancement Via Individual Determination ===
Liberty High School participates in the Advancement Via Individual Determination (AVID) program. This program helps prepare students in the academic middle for post-secondary education.

=== Cambridge Program ===
Liberty High School has discontinued the Cambridge International Examination Program. There was only one cohort of students who finished all 4 years.

== Extracurricular activities ==
Liberty has a comprehensive list of clubs and other extra curricular activities in which students may be engaged, including athletics, Ambassadors, band, drama (which has most of the awards rating superior in many of their shows including one MAINSTAGE "clean house"), digital design, Environmental Club, FFA, Army JROTC, Keyettes, National Honor Society, National Technical Honor Society, Web Design, and Skills USA. LHS also offers many varsity sports: football, golf, cross country, swim & dive, volleyball, wrestling, competitive cheer, basketball, soccer, tennis, baseball, softball and weight lifting.
