= Beaumont Middle School =

Middle school in Kissimmee, Florida

Beaumont Middle School is a decommissioned middle school located in Kissimmee, Florida. Beaumont once served as the magnet middle school for the Osceola County region.

The school opened in 1951, and was closed in February 1997 when its replacement, Kissimmee Middle School, opened.

== History ==
Beaumont was built a few blocks from Lake Toho and downtown Kissimmee, at the corner of Beaumont and Sumner St. Classes ceased in the main High School building in 1975. During the 1974–1975 school year, the student body was cut in half, with those generally north and east of the campus being assigned to the new Denn- John school which was under construction. Those assigned to Denn-John were placed in classrooms in the old original Osceola High School building, and those assigned to stay at Beaumont Middle occupied the newer section of campus. Common areas such as the cafeteria, shop, PE and Home Ec. were shared.

Each school had its own office and administrators, the office for Denn John being in the Old building. In January 1975, the new Denn-John middle school campus was completed, and all the students assigned to that school moved to the new campus. At that time the Original Osceola High School building was no longer being used for students. The School Districts Audio-visual department and 16MM film library continued to be housed at that site, as it had been for several years prior to the closure to students in 1975. The property however remained in use by the county as a textbook storage facility and by truant students looking for a quick smoke.

The school was closed in February 1997 when its replacement opened. In September, the Osceola School Board determined the school would be demolished (at a cost of about $276,000), due to vandals, mold and leaking damage to the entire campus.

In June 1999, lightning produced by a severe thunderstorm ignited a fire that consumed the historic portion of Beaumont. Osceola County officials determined the building a complete casualty and planned to re-develop the site as office buildings. A coalition of former students argued for the design and construction of a community center. In the end, neither plan was approved. This portion of the site remains vacant.

Beaumont Middle school buildings now contain a mix of county and state offices. In September 2017, Osceola County sold the property to the city of Kissimmee, with the city leasing the office space from the county through the middle of 2021.
