= Aaron Herr =

American baseball player (born 1981)

- Right fielder / Third baseman
- Born: March 7, 1981 (age 44); Lancaster, Pennsylvania, U.S.
- Bats: Right Throws: Right

Aaron Mitchell Herr (born March 7, 1981) is an American professional baseball player who played for the Lancaster Barnstormers of the independent Atlantic League in 2011. He has played the majority of his minor league career with the Atlanta Braves organization.

He is the son of Tom Herr, who was also a professional baseball player and Aaron's high school coach. His younger brother, Jordan, is a member of the Great Falls Voyagers, the Rookie-level affiliate of the Chicago White Sox.

== Career ==
=== Rookie and Single-A beginning ===
Herr was drafted by the Braves in the first round of the 2000 amateur early draft, and he was later selected by the Seattle Mariners in the Rule 5 draft but was later released. After playing with the Braves rookie and AA-level affiliates in Lake Buena Vista, Danville, Macon, Myrtle Beach, and Greenville, he signed with his hometown Lancaster Barnstormers in 2005, but never played a game.

=== Double-A rising star to Triple-A All-Star ===
The St. Louis Cardinals picked up Herr and allocated him to their AA-level team, the Springfield Cardinals.

In 2006, Herr joined the Cincinnati Reds organization, and was initially assigned to the Chattanooga Lookouts. Later in the 2006 season, he moved his way up to the AAA-level Louisville Bats.

Granted free agency after the season, Herr signed a minor-league contract with the Cleveland Indians, and played for the AAA-level Buffalo Bisons. Herr had his best season with Louisville in 2007, when he hit a .274 batting average with thirty-one doubles and nineteen home runs and played as a member of the 2007 International League All-Star team.

On June 23, 2008, he was traded back to the Cincinnati Reds organization for cash considerations, and he was assigned to the Louisville Bats.

=== The return home ===
On March 5, 2009, his hometown Lancaster Barnstormers signed Aaron Herr for the 2009 season. His return to Lancaster was the result of the Cincinnati Reds dropping him from their system after a severe groin injury. Herr's signing with the Barnstormers was his attempt to show an affiliated team that he was healthy enough for professional baseball. Coincidentally, his father was Lancaster's bench coach for the 2009 season.

Herr retired following the 2011 season.

== Trivia ==
Aaron served as a batboy for the St. Louis Cardinals in the 1980s, when his father played on the team.
