= Celebration High School =

Public high school in Celebration, Florida

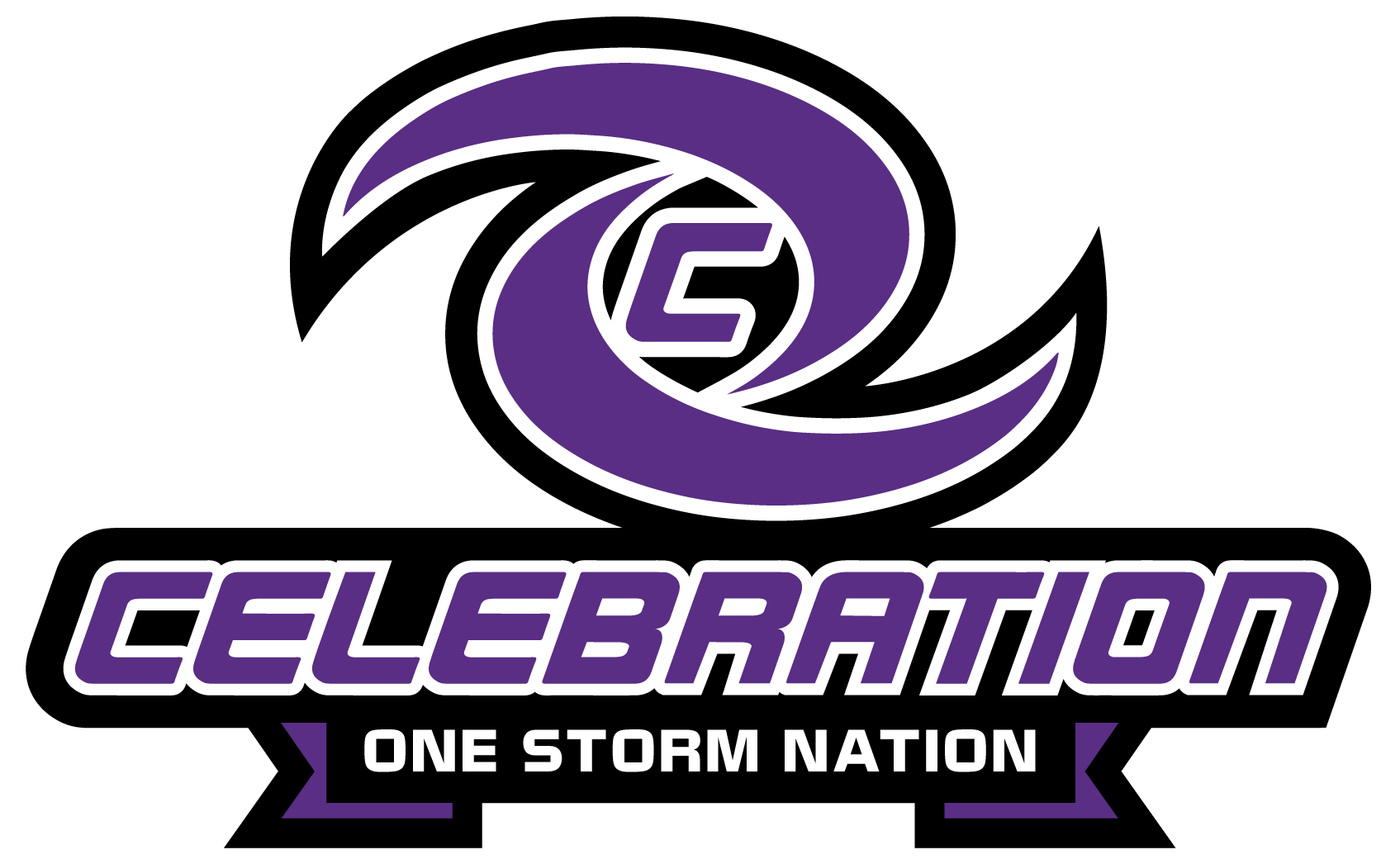

Location
- 1809 Celebration Boulevard; Celebration FL 34747; United States; 28.29867°N 81.568982°W

Information
- School type: Title I, Public
- Motto: Make it Matter
- Established: 2003
- Status: Active
- School district: School District of Osceola County
- NCES District ID: 1201470
- Superintendent: Mark Shanoff
- NCES School ID: 120147004118
- Principal: Christopher Todd
- Teaching staff: 113.50 (FTE)
- Grades: 9–12
- Enrollment: 2,681 (2025-2026)
  - Grade 9: 717
  - Grade 10: 635
  - Grade 11: 705
  - Grade 12: 624
- Student to teacher ratio: 23.62
- Education system: Secondary education
- Classes offered: Regular, Advanced Placement, IB Programme, AICE
- Language: English
- Hours in school day: 7:15am – 2:10pm 7:15am – 1:10pm (Wednesdays)
- Campus type: Suburban
- Colors: Purple; Silver
- Slogan: Home of the Storm
- Athletics: Yes
- Athletics conference: Orange Belt Conference
- Sports: Yes
- Mascot: The Storm
- Accreditation: Southern Association of Colleges and Schools
- Newspaper: The Aftermath
- Yearbook: The Storm Record
- Website: clhs.osceolaschools.net

Celebration High School is a public four year high school located in Celebration, Florida, United States. It is a part of the School District of Osceola County, Florida. It is one of two schools in the Osceola County district to offer the International Baccalaureate (IB) program.

Christopher Todd, the current principal as of 2026, puts pride in the school's diversity of programs and their success, specifically its Visual and Performing Arts, IB Program, and AFJROTC. Every morning announcement, he quotes a saying, "Good, better, best. Never let it rest. 'Til your good is better and your better is best." With such determination, he hopes to bring Celebration High School up to an 'A' school and to continue supporting both staff and students on a journey for everyone to reach "their fullest potential."

== Overview ==
Celebration High School was graded a 'B' school by the Florida Department of Education. The graduation rate in 2025 was 97%.

Students have the opportunity to take Advanced Placement course work and exams. The AP participation rate at Celebration High School is 55%. The school currently has a College Readiness Score of 44.1/100.0. 29% of students are economically disadvantaged, and are eligible for free (29%) or reduced-price (1%) lunch as of 2021.

Celebration High School graduates have gone on to attend a wide range of colleges and universities across Florida and the United States. Many students continue their education at top state universities such as University of Florida, University of Central Florida, Florida State University, and the University of South Florida. Others have earned admission to highly selective out-of-state institutions, including New York University, University of Pennsylvania, Northeastern University, Johns Hopkins University, California Institute of Technology, University of California, Davis, Dartmouth College, Brown University, and Cornell University.

== Athletics ==
Celebration High School competes in the Florida High School Athletic Association (FHSAA) using the nickname of "The Storm." The football field, which is located in front of the main school buildings and parking lot, is currently named “La Rosa Field at John Bushey Stadium”. The stadium is named after Celebration High School's first principal John Bushey, and La Rosa Realty currently owns the naming rights. The Celebration Storm Football, Flag Football, Soccer, and Lacrosse, teams all play their home games on this field.

Athletic Programs offered at Celebration High School:

- Baseball
- Basketball
- Bowling
- Cheerleading
- Cross Country
- Fishing
- Flag Football
- Football
- Golf
- Lacrosse
- Marching Band
- Soccer
- Softball
- Swimming
- Tennis
- Track & Field
- Volleyball
- Weightlifting
- Wrestling

== International Baccalaureate Programme ==
Celebration High School was authorized as an International Baccalaureate (IB) school on March 18, 2011. As of 2026, Kayla Vazquez is the counselor, and Donald Blackmon is the coordinator. The school provides both the Diploma Programme (DP) and Career-related Programme (CP), as well as a pre-IB course for 9th and 10th grade students. The program offers a variety of courses including:

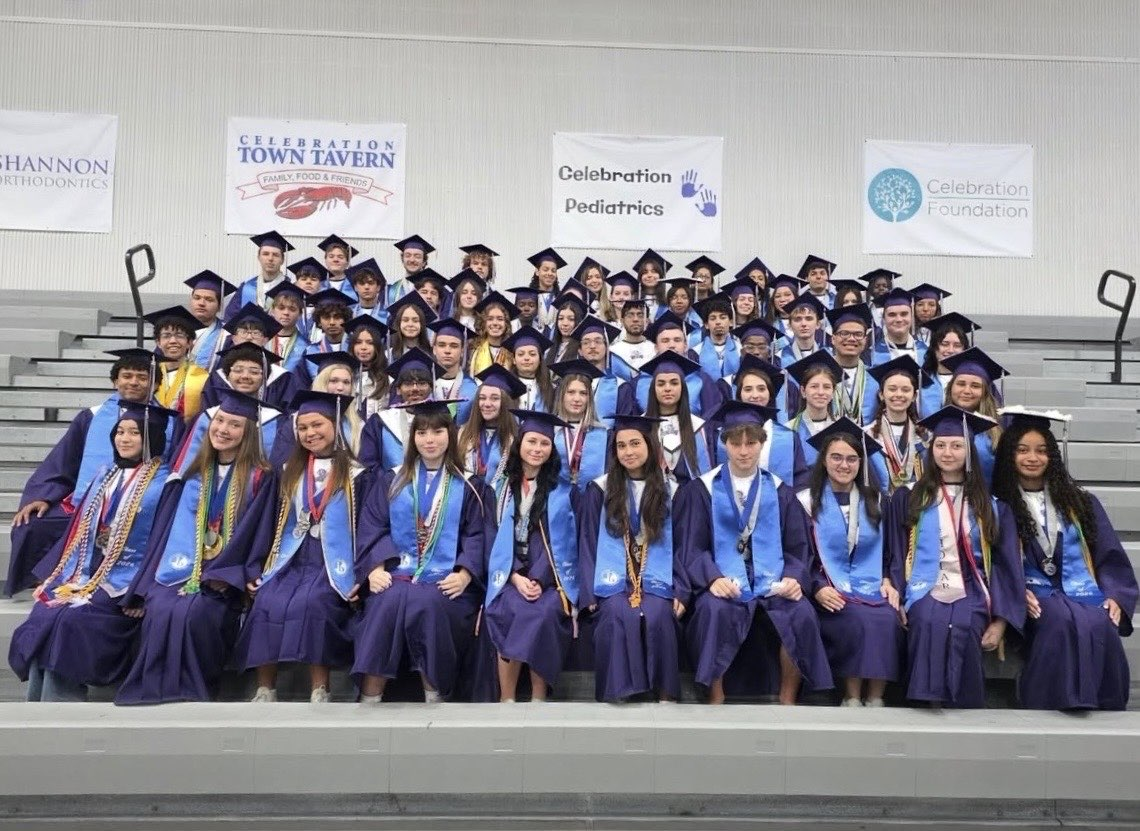
Class photo of the graduating IB class of 2026 at Celebration High School.

- Biology HL/SL
- Chemistry HL/SL
- Sports, exercise and health science HL/SL
- Environmental Systems and Societies HL/SL
- Dance SL
- Music HL/SL
- English A Language and Literature HL
- Global Politics SL
- Mathematics: analysis and approaches HL/SL
- Mathematics: applications and interpretation SL
- Philosophy HL/SL
- Psychology SL
- Geography HL/SL
- Theory of Knowledge
- Visual Arts HL
- Spanish B HL/SL
- Spanish ab initio SL
- French B HL/SL

== Special programs ==
Along with the numerous classes offered Celebration High School offers a variety of academic and career-oriented programs designed to prepare students for college, careers, and future success. These special programs include:

- Dual Enrollment
  - Majority of students earn their Associate in Arts (A.A.) Degree through Valencia College
- Biomedical (Project Lead the Way)
  - Students can take this program for 3–4 years, in which they are given the opportunity to take the Biotechnology Aptitude and Competency Exam (BACE), Administered through Biotility at the University of Florida.
- Computer Programming
- World Languages
- Health Science
- AVID
- Digital Media
- Family and Consumer Science
- First Aid & Safety
- Air Force ROTC
- Residential Property Management
- Hospitality

== AFJROTC ==
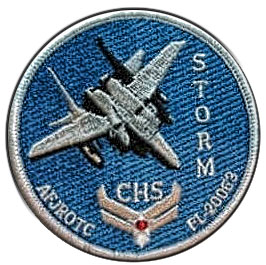
FL-20053's Unit Patch.

Celebration High School has an Air Force Junior ROTC that operates within the school as an elective class. It was established in 2005. It is one of the top-performing ROTC programs in Osceola County, having won the county championship three years in a row.

== Enrollment demographics ==
Celebration High School enrollment characteristics for the 2025–2026 school year.

Total number of students enrolled: 2,681

Enrollment by gender:

- Female students: 1,352 (50.43%)
- Male students: 1,329 (49.57%)

Enrollment by race and ethnicity:

- Non-Hispanic White: 668 (24.92%)
- African-American: 191 (7.12%)
- Asian-American: 76 (2.83%)
- American Indian/Alaskan Native: 7 (0.26%)
- Hawaiian Native/Pacific Islander: 6 (0.22%)
- Hispanic or Latino of any race: 1,656 (61.77%)
- Two or More Races: 77 (2.87%)
