= Harmony High School =

Coordinates: 28.1941807°N 81.1575662°W

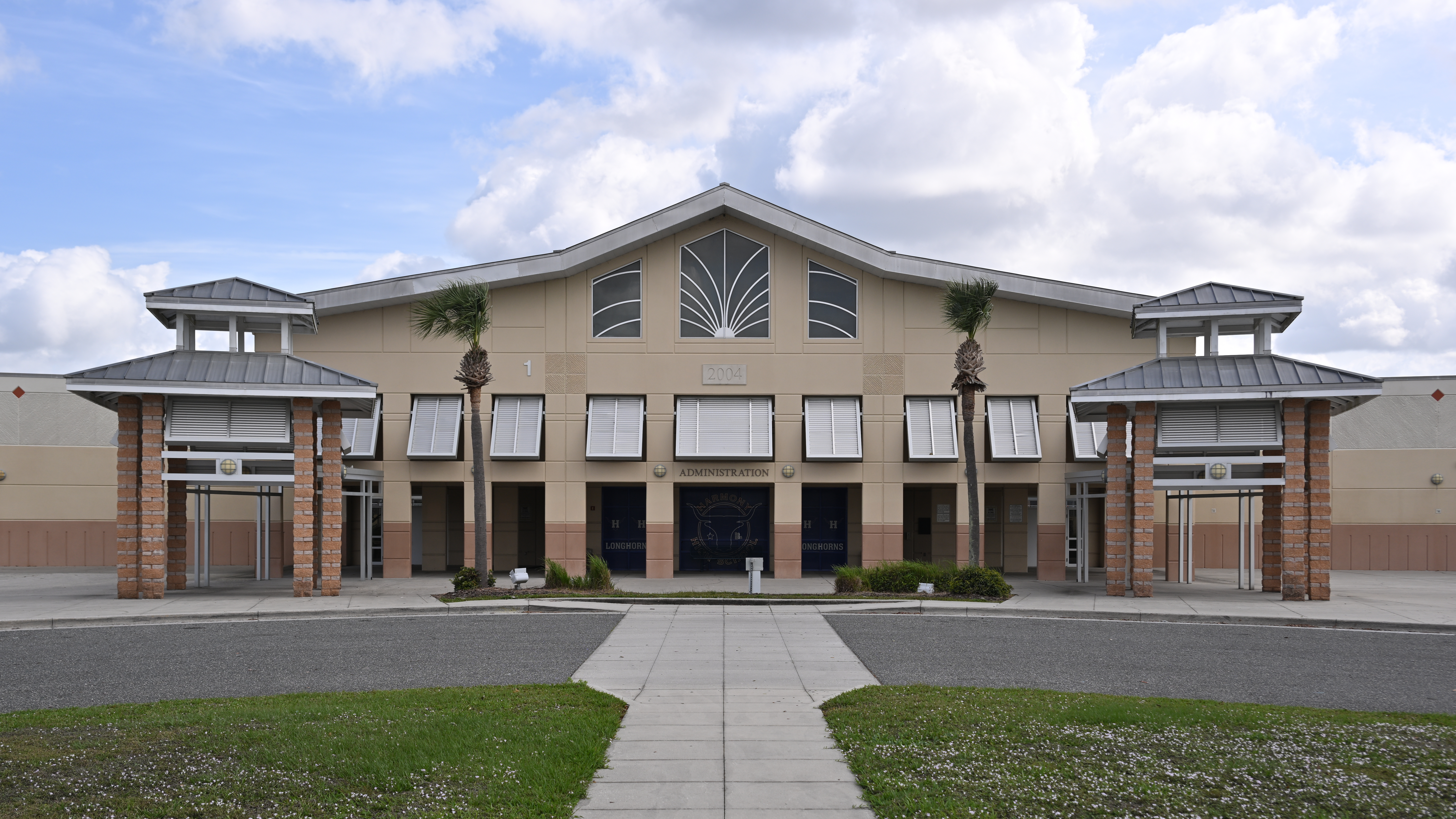

Location
- 3601 Arthur J. Gallagher Blvd. Harmony, Florida; United States

Information
- Type: Public
- Motto: "We are here to receive, so we have more to give"
- Established: 2004
- School district: Osceola County
- Principal: Jennifer Ramsey
- Staff: 125.50 (FTE)
- Faculty: 97
- Grades: 9–12
- Student to teacher ratio: 22.27
- Campus size: 42 acres (170,000 m^{2})
- Campus type: Suburban/Rural
- Color: Burnt Orange Cobalt Blue
- Athletics: FHSAA Member School
- Athletics conference: Orange Belt Conference
- Mascot: Touchdown the Longhorn
- Affiliation: None
- Website: hrhs.osceolaschools.net

Harmony High School (often abbreviated to HHS) is a public high school in Harmony, Florida, United States. It is one of nine schools in the Osceola County School District.

== Athletics ==
Harmony High School is a member of the FHSAA and the Orange Belt Conference. Harmony High School offers the following sports:

- Baseball
- Basketball
- Cross Country
- Flag Football
- Football
- Golf
- Cheerleading
- Soccer
- Swimming and Diving
- Tennis
- Track and Field
- Volleyball
- Weightlifting
- Wrestling
- Marching Band
- Color Guard
- Winter Guard
- Fishing

== Demographics ==
- School enrollment: 2014
- White students: 58.6%
- Multiracial: 34.4%
- Pacific Islander: 0.1%
- Black students: 4.6%
- Asian students: 1.8%
- Hispanic Students: 80%
- Native American students: 0.5%
- Female students: 47.0%
- Male students: 53.0%
