= Osceola Technical College =

Public school in Florida, United States

- Type: Public community college
- Established: 1994
- Principal: Tom Ott
- Faculty: 99
- Students: 1003
- Location: Kissimmee, Florida, U.S. 28.298646°N 81.349478°W
- Colors: Maroon and Gold
- Mascot: Patriot
- Website: otec.osceolaschools.net

Osceola Technical College is a public community college in unincorporated Osceola County, Florida.
