= Harmony, Florida =

- Unincorporated community
- Town of Harmony
- Location of Harmony in Florida
- Coordinates: 28°11′22″N 81°08′42″W
- Country: United States
- State: Florida
- County: Osceola
- Established: 2003
- Elevation: 79 ft (24 m)
- Time zone: UTC-5 (Eastern (EST))
  - Summer (DST): UTC-4 (EDT)
- ZIP code: 34773
- Area codes: 407, 689
- FIPS code: 12-12097
- GNIS feature ID: 2063058

Harmony is an unincorporated master-planned community near St. Cloud, Florida, United States. It is part of the Orlando–Kissimmee Metropolitan Statistical Area.

According to 2010 Census data, Harmony is home to more than 1,000 residents.

Harmony is a Green-certified community, certified by the Florida Green Building Coalition.

Development plans for Harmony were set in motion by 1996. The Harmony Community Development District was established by local ordinance in March 2000.

Harmony developed a cooperative relationship with the University of Florida's Department of Wildlife Ecology and Conservation in 2001. Harmony was demonstrating a real-life example of people living and working in the same community. The goal was to show that this could be done in a sustainable way while also minimizing the impact on the local ecology.

The Harmony Residential Owners Association (ROA) was created on October 8, 2002. The Harmony ROA is noteworthy among home owners associations in that it established within its founding documents guidelines delineating the peaceful coexistence of humans and wild animals.

Harmony was opened for occupancy in approximately 2003 and ownership was transferred to Starwood Capital Group in 2005.
