= Poinciana High School =

Location
- 2300 S. Poinciana Blvd. 34758; Kissimmee, Florida; United States

Information
- Type: Public
- Established: 1991
- School district: Osceola County
- Dean: Mrs. Jennifer Alisson, Mr. Robert Miller, Mr. Rodrick Scott
- Principal: Jeffrey Schwartz
- Staff: 125.00 (FTE)
- Grades: 9-12
  - Grade 9: 637
  - Grade 10: 650
  - Grade 11: 619
  - Grade 12: 549
- Student to teacher ratio: 19.64
- Campus type: Suburban/Rural
- Colors: Red and blue
- Athletics: FHSAA Member School
- Athletics conference: Orange Belt Conference
- Mascot: Egle the Eagle
- Website: Poinciana High School

Poinciana High School is located near Campbell in the census-designated area of Poinciana, in Osceola County, Florida. It is part of the Osceola County School District.

== Fine Arts ==
Though Poinciana High School had very quality band and choral programs in the beginning of the 2000 decade, and produced many fine musicians during this time, including high seated Florida All-State musicians, the music programs are still in a state of rebuilding. Thanks to the former Principal, Belynda Pinkston, there was an effort to revive the fine arts programs to their previous levels. The school finally opened its first performing arts center before the 2009–10 school year, named after former principal, and now Superintendent of the Osceola County School District, Debra Pace.

== Junior ROTC ==
Poinciana High School also has a Navy Junior ROTC program, which was, highly ranked in the state, as well as in the country, many times over in the former decade.

== Hurricanes of 2004 ==
In the historic hurricane season for the Central Florida area in 2004, Poinciana High School was hit very hard by Hurricane Charley. Damage to the Gymnasium and Cafeteria was the worst of the damage on campus. After some time of no pep rallies, basketball games, football games, or school dances, the building was able to be completely redone towards the end of the school year.

== TV Arrivals ==
In the 2003–04 school year, after the death of two students in a drag-racing related incident, as well as the death of a teacher from cancer, students were able to help start a surprise visit by the rapper Ludacris during a pep-rally style event, hosted by MTV. The following school year, after hurricanes Charley, Frances, and Jeanne caused heavy damage to the school, MTV selected the essay written by students of Poinciana High School as the winner of the "MTV Made My School Year" contest. This included $135,000 in awards, most popular of which was the $25,000 worth of enhancements to the prom that year. Aside from MTV, Poinciana more recently received a surprise visit from architect, television host, and producer Danny Forster of Discovery Channel January 2014.

== Egle the Eagle ==
Egle the Eagle received his name in Poinciana High School's opening school year. During a pep rally, the cheer leader leading the cheer misspelled the word 'Eagles', yelling "E - G - L - E - S" and this was then used later that year to name the mascot as Egle the Eagle, though the name has been forgotten over the years, and is rarely referenced by any name now.

== Enrollment Characteristics ==
Poinciana High School enrollment characteristics for the 2019–2020 school year.

Total number of students enrolled: 2,045 (100%)

Enrollment by gender:

- Male Students: 1,098 (53.90%)
- Female Students: 947 (46.09%)

Enrollment by race and ethnicity:

- African-American: 366 (17.96%)
- Non-Hispanic White: 265 (13.00%)
- Asian-American: 42 (2.06%)
- American Indian/Alaskan Native: 7 (0.34%)
- Hawaiian Native/Pacific Islander: 6 (0.29%)
- Two or More Races: 38 (1.86%)
- Hispanic or Latino of any race: 1,313 (64.45%)

== Notable alumni ==
- Dariusz Bladek, Professional Canadian football offensive lineman for the Toronto Argonauts of the Canadian Football League (CFL)
- R Dub! Internationally syndicated radio DJ, sultan, world traveler
- Tama Tonga, Tongan-American professional wrestler
