= Gateway High School (Florida) =

Location
- 93 Panther Paws Trail; Kissimmee, Florida 34744; United States
- 28°17′41″N 81°21′40″W

Information
- Type: Public High School
- Motto: Graduation and Beyond
- Established: 1986
- Status: Currently Operational
- School district: Osceola County
- NCES District ID: 1201470
- NCES School ID: 120147002476
- Principal: Georgette Paul-Zin
- Teaching staff: 84.00 (FTE)
- Grades: 9-12
- Gender: Coed
- Enrollment: 1,882 (2024–2025)
- Student to teacher ratio: 22.40
- Campus type: Suburban
- Colors: Black,silver,white and red
- Mascot: Panthers
- Affiliation: None
- Website: GHS

Gateway High School is a high school located in Kissimmee, Florida. It is home to Osceola County's International Baccalaureate Program and is also the site for one of the largest Performing Arts Centers in the county, which houses the Thespian Society, known for its various productions and awards won at the Florida Thespian Competition.

== Notable alumni ==
- Moses Regular (class of 1989), former NFL and NFL Europe player
- Joe Torres (class of 2000), former baseball player and current MLB coach
- Victor Montalvo (class of 2012), breakdancer
