= Osceola High School (Kissimmee, Florida) =

Public high school in Kissimmee, Florida, United States

Location
- 420 South Thacker Avenue; Kissimmee, Florida 34741; United States; 28°17′16″N 81°25′38″W

Information
- School type: Public, high school High School
- Motto: Every Child, Every Chance, Every Day!
- Established: September 5, 1887
- School district: School District of Osceola County
- NCES District ID: 1201470
- Superintendent: Mark Shanoff
- CEEB code: 100860
- NCES School ID: 120147001469
- Principal: Elizabeth Kennedy
- Teaching staff: 116.00 FTE
- Grades: 9-12
- Gender: Coed
- Enrollment: 2,408 (2024-25)
- Student to teacher ratio: 20.61
- Colors: Blue and gold
- Athletics conference: Orange Belt Conference
- Mascot: Kowboy Jake
- Nickname: Kowboys
- Accreditation: Southern Association of Colleges and Schools
- Website: Osceola High School website

Osceola High School (OHS) is a public high school located in Kissimmee, Florida, United States. The school was established on September 5, 1889 along with 20 other schools in Osceola County. It was referred to as "the Kissimmee school" until it was renamed "Osceola High School" in 1889.

== Demographics ==
OHS enrolls students in grades 9-12 and is part of the School District of Osceola County. The school enrolled 2,408 Kissimmee students as of the 2024–2025 school year. It is a minority-majority school in that students who identify as Hispanic outnumber students who identify as other ethnicities.

As of the 2024–2025 school year, the ethnic makeup of OHS is as follows:

Ethnicity	Percentage
American Indian/Alaskan Native	1%
Asian/Pacific Islander	3%
Black/Non-Hispanic	13%
Hispanic/Latino	68%
Multiracial	2%
White/Non-Hispanic	14%

== Notable alumni ==
- Charles Bronson, Florida Department of Agriculture and Consumer Services commissioner
- William James Bryan, United States Senator of Florida
- John Hugh "Buddy" Dyer, mayor of Orlando and Florida State Senator
- Taula "Hikuleo" Fifita, professional wrestler
- Bo Mascoe, college football cornerback for the Texas Longhorns
- Vanessa Vanjie Mateo, Drag Queen from Rupaul's Drag Race
- AJ McLean, singer from the Backstreet Boys
- Markus Paul, American football player
- Edwin Rios, Major League Baseball player
- Bobby Sippio, NFL, Arena football, arena coach
- Paula Stark, politician
- Brett Williams, American football player
- Jeremiah Wilson, American football player
