= McKissack Ponds =

Lake in the state of Florida, United States

- Location of McKissack Ponds
- Location: Carrabelle, Florida
- Coordinates: 29°50′33″N 84°41′5″W (center)
- Max. length: Largest pond is.32 kilometres (0.20 mi) long
- Surface elevation: 3 feet (1 m)

The McKissack Ponds (sometimes misspelled as McKissick) are five small ponds in the city limits of Carrabelle, Franklin County, Florida, just west – 0.3 miles (0.48 km) to 0.8 miles (1.3 km) – of the Carrabelle–Thompson Airport, on the north and south sides of Airport Road. The McKissack Ponds are owned by Franklin County.

== History ==
=== Locations ===
Carrabelle is a coastal inland rural town, contiguous to St. George Sound (part of the Apalachee Bay system), just west of St. James Island, on the Gulf of Mexico's northeastern coast – sometimes referred to as "the Forgotten Coast" – in the Panhandle. The ponds are south of the Carrabelle River and west of U.S. Route 98 in an area called Carrabelle Beach, which was known before World War II as McKissack Beach. From another perspective, the ponds are 3.4 miles (5.5 km) due north (and slightly west) of the southern tip of Dog Island.

- The most northerly pond – the second largest, sometimes referred to as Lake Pristine – lies within Lake Pristine Circle (a road in a real estate subdivision), about 2/10ths of a mile (0.32 km) south-southwest of the Carrabelle River's southern shore.
- The largest pond – south of Lake Pristine, sometimes referred to as Big Lake McKissack – lies south of McKissack Lane (a road in another real estate subdivision), north of Airport Road (aka Franklin County Road 376).

==== Sections, townships, and ranges ====
Under a United States Public Land Survey System, originally defined by the United States General Land Office, McKissack Ponds are located in:

- Sections 19 and 30, Township 7 South, Range 4 West, and
- Sections 24 and 25, Township 7 South, Range 5 West of the

Tallahassee meridian (a principal meridian).

=== 1977 USGS designation ===
The United States Geological Survey (USGS) Board on Geographic Names (BGN), in its mission to standardize geographic features, formally rendered a decision to recognize McKissack Ponds December 8, 1977.

According to the USGS, The largest McKissack Pond is located 2.1 kilometres (1.3 mi) southwest of the Carrabelle village center.

== Namesake ==
McKissack is the surname of a family, long-time residents of the area, the first Floridian generation being William Crawford McKissack (born in Shorterville, Alabama; 1878–1958), a pharmacist and real estate developer who – with his wife, Mae Pickett (maiden; born in Apalachicola, Florida, 1879–1925) – moved from Shorterville to Carrabelle in 1903, and, for more than 50 years, in Carrabelle, operated a drugstore on Main Street – "The W.C. McKissack Drug Store." W.C. McKissack was often called "Doc" McKissack, though, he was not a medical doctor. McKissack had purchased about 3,000 acres in the Carrabelle area. One of his grandsons, Luke McKissack (né Charles Luke McKissack; 1937–2010) was a notable civil rights lawyer in Los Angeles. One of his greatgranddaughters (Luke's daughter) is Lana McKissack (née Lana Cordezia McKissack; born 1984), a film actress and producer, who, since 2012, has been married to Nathan John Moore, Jr. (born 1880), also an actor and producer.

== Maps ==
- Nautical Chart 11404 (alternate link), National Oceanic and Atmospheric Administration (degrees, minutes, seconds: 29° 50' 0" 32.9928"; N 84° 41' W)
