= Forgotten Coast =

Region in Florida

Counties constituting the Forgotten Coast.

The Forgotten Coast refers to a largely undeveloped and sparsely populated coastline in the panhandle of the US state of Florida. The trademarked term was first used in 1992, but the Forgotten Coast's exact extent is not agreed upon.

== Description ==
The Forgotten Coast is a trademark first used by the Apalachicola Bay Chamber of Commerce on September 1, 1992. The name is most commonly used to refer to a relatively quiet, undeveloped and sparsely populated section of coastline stretching from Mexico Beach on the Gulf of Mexico to St. Marks on Apalachee Bay in the U.S. state of Florida. The nearest major cities are Tallahassee, about 90 miles northeast of Apalachicola, and Panama City, home of Tyndall Air Force Base, about 60 miles to the northwest.

The Tourist Development Council of Franklin County defines the Forgotten Coast as Franklin County itself. They add that the Forgotten Coast got its name "because it’s the last remaining stretch of unspoiled, pristine Gulf Coast beaches that haven’t been overrun by high rises and strip malls." In the council's definition of the Forgotten Coast, there are 200 miles of coastline, 5 islands, and nearly 100 historic sites, and it is a part of the Big Bend geographic region.

== Communities ==
In addition to the endpoints, it encompasses the coastal communities of (west to east):

- Port St. Joe
- Cape San Blas
- Apalachicola
- Eastpoint
- Carrabelle
- Lanark Village
- Alligator Point
- Panacea
- Shell Point

These communities are located in the following counties, which by extension may be included in references to the Forgotten Coast by some writers:

- Gulf County, Florida
- Franklin County, Florida
- Wakulla County, Florida

=== Peninsulas and barrier islands ===
The area is renowned for its oyster and shrimp production, marine wildlife, and fine white-sand beaches. Peninsulas and barrier islands along the coast include:

- Gulf County:
  - St. Joseph Peninsula
  - Cape San Blas
- Franklin County:
  - St. Vincent Island
  - Cape St. George Island
  - St. George Island
  - Dog Island

=== Protected natural and historic areas ===
- St. Joseph Peninsula State Park
- Apalachicola National Estuarine Research Reserve
- Prospect Bluff Historic Sites
- St. Vincent National Wildlife Refuge
- St. George Island State Park
- Tate's Hell State Forest
- Bald Point State Park
- Wakulla State Forest
- Edward Ball Wakulla Springs State Park
- San Marcos de Apalache Historic State Park
- St. Marks National Wildlife Refuge
- Tallahassee-St. Marks Historic Railroad State Trail

== See also ==
- Florida Panhandle
- Emerald Coast, to the west
- Nature Coast, to the east and south
