= X13 =

X13 may refer to:

- X13 (New York City bus)
- Carrabelle–Thompson Airport, in Florida, United States
- Chris Higgins (musician) (born 1972), American musician
- Crown of Ancient Glory, an adventure module for the Dungeons & Dragons fantasy role-playing game
- Ryan X-13 Vertijet, an American experimental aircraft
- ThinkPad X13, a series of laptops manufactured by Lenovo
- "X13", a song by GZR from Plastic Planet
