= St. James Island =

Island in the United States of America

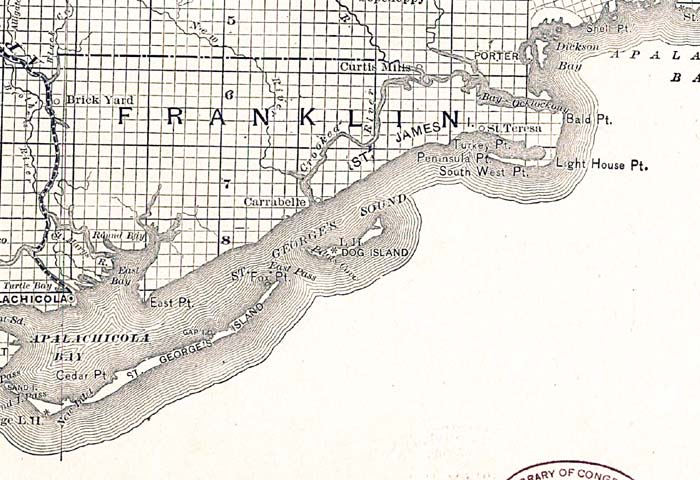
- 1888 map of Franklin County showing St. James Island

- St. James Island

Geography
- Coordinates: 29°57′04″N 84°31′36″W
- Length: 20 mi (30 km)
- Width: 4 mi (6 km)

Administration
- United States
- State: Florida
- County: Franklin

St. James Island is an inhabited area along the Florida Panhandle surrounded by the Carrabelle River, Crooked River, Ochlockonee River, and St. George Sound in Franklin County, Florida. It is more than 20 miles (32 km) long and averages 4 miles (6.4 km) wide. It is separated from the mainland by the tidal Crooked River. The highest elevation on St. James Island is 70 feet (21 m) above sea level, the highest on the Gulf coast of Florida between Pensacola and Tampa.

The city of Carabelle and communities of Lanark Village, St. Teresa, Alligator Point, and Bald Point are on the island. Bald Point State Park is on the eastern end of the island and another part of the island is in Tate's Hell State Forest. The area has been used commercially for timber and commercial fishing with tourism and retirement increasing more recently. Locally it is not usually spoken of as an island.
