= Bald Point State Park =

State park in Florida, United States

- IUCN category IV (habitat/species management area)
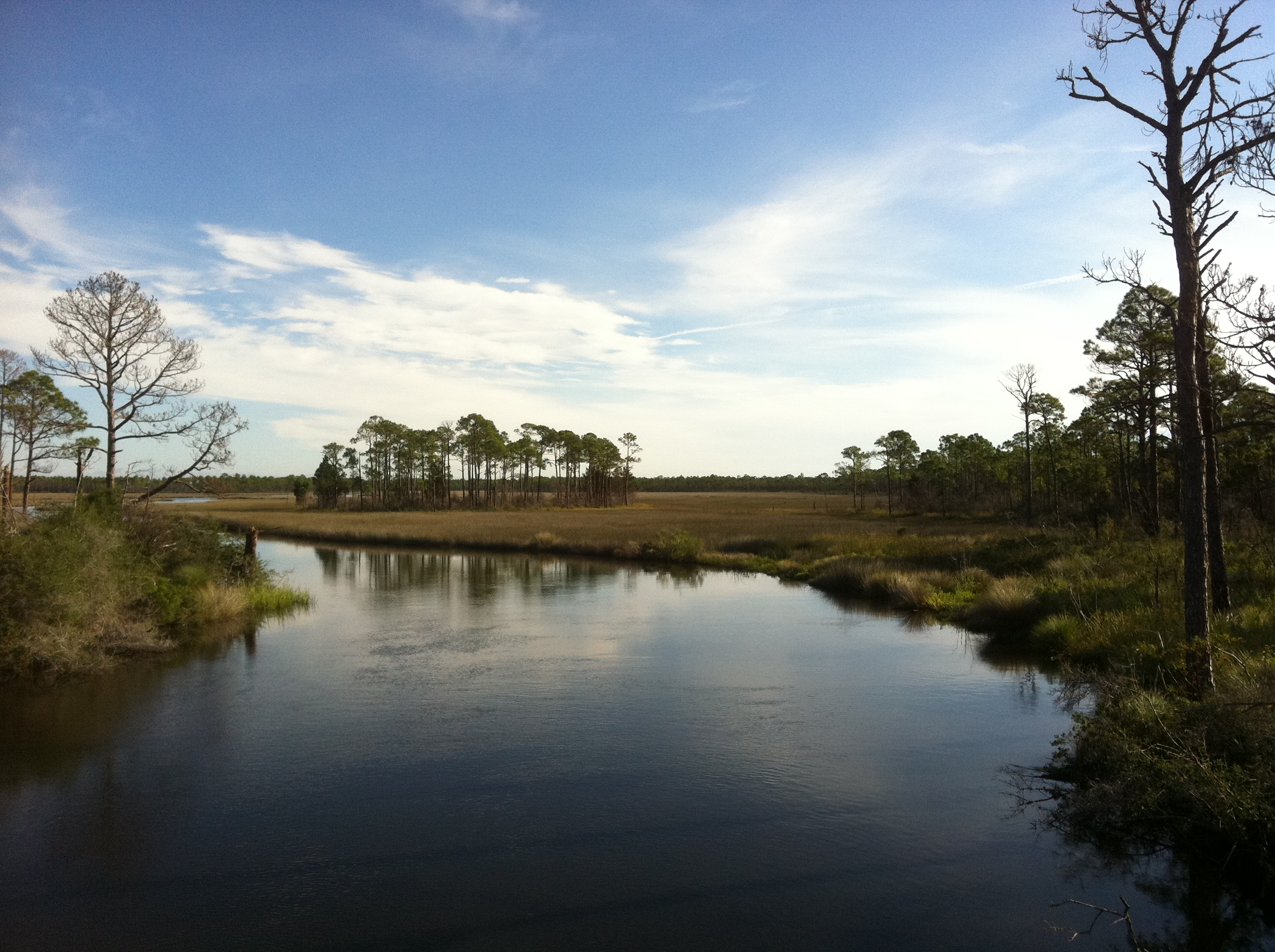
- Overlooking Chaires Creek

- Location within Florida Location within the United States
- Interactive map of Bald Point State Park
- Location: Franklin County, Florida, U.S.
- Nearest city: Alligator Point
- Coordinates: 29°56′51″N 84°20′29″W
- Area: 12,152.22 acres (4,917.83 ha)
- Established: August 30, 1999
- Visitors: 38,162 (in 2012–2021 average)
- Governing body: Florida Department of Environmental Protection

Bald Point State Park is a Florida State Park located south of Ochlockonee Bay, approximately seven miles southeast of Panacea, on St. James Island in Alligator Point, Tallahassee's closest beach, off U.S. 98, in Franklin County northwestern Florida. The address is 146 Box Cut. Park was named after Bald Point cape on eastern tip of St. James Island in Ochlockonee Bay.

The first land in Bald Point State Park, 1,349 acres (5.46 km^{2}) primarily along the shore of Apalachee Bay, was purchased by the state in 1999. A major expansion of the park occurred in 2002 when Florida purchased 2,851 acres (11.54 km^{2}) of land from St. Joe Company for $10.3 million. The purchased land was on Ochlockonee Bay, east of the Crooked River (Florida) in Franklin County, Florida. As of 2006, the park included approximately 4,860 acres (19.7 km^{2}).

== History ==
=== Precontact ===
Human activity in the Big Bend coastal region stretches back over 12,000 years, though most Paleoindian-period sites in the region were submerged by the Holocene sea level rise or buried under several layers of soil. By the Middle Archaic period, permanent villages emerged in conjunction with the newly formed estuaries giving rise to extensive shell middens. Occupation continued in the region through the Woodland period with Deptford, Swift Creek, and Weeden Island cultures with pottery, middens, and village remains defining each period.

Into the first millennium, the Mississippian period is noted in the archaeological record with the prominence of the Fort Walton culture in this region. Key features include new pottery practices, larger village sizes, maize farming, and taller platform mounds.

=== Archaeology ===
Thirty-one archaeological sites are recorded in the Florida Master Site File within or partially within the Bald Point Tract, and eighteen more on the St. Teresa Tract. The largest is the Tucker site (8FR00004), a shell midden associated with a permanent Native American village whose occupation spans the Deptford through Fort Walton periods. Recorded artifacts from the site include aboriginal ceramics, animal bone, seventy human burials, lithics, mica, galena beads, copper, and worked shell; the portion within the park boundary remains largely undisturbed and supports a closed maritime hammock.

The adjacent Yent Mound (8FR00005), first investigated by Clarence B. Moore in 1902, is considered one of the best-known North Florida expressions of the Hopewellian Ceremonial Complex (circa 500 BC – AD 500) and yielded seventy-four human burials along with ceramics, worked shell, and copper artifacts. Most of the Yent Mound has since been damaged by residential development and looting. Additional recorded sites at the park document Deptford, Swift Creek, Weeden Island, and Fort Walton occupations, several with diagnostic Carrabelle Incised, Wakulla Check Stamped, Weeden Island Red, and Pensacola Plain ceramics.

== Recreation ==
The park has beaches, bicycling, birding, canoeing, fishing, hiking, kayaking, swimming and wildlife viewing.

Five trailheads provide access to 18 miles (29 km) of hiking and cycling trails through coastal marshes, pine flatwoods, and oak thickets.

== Gallery ==
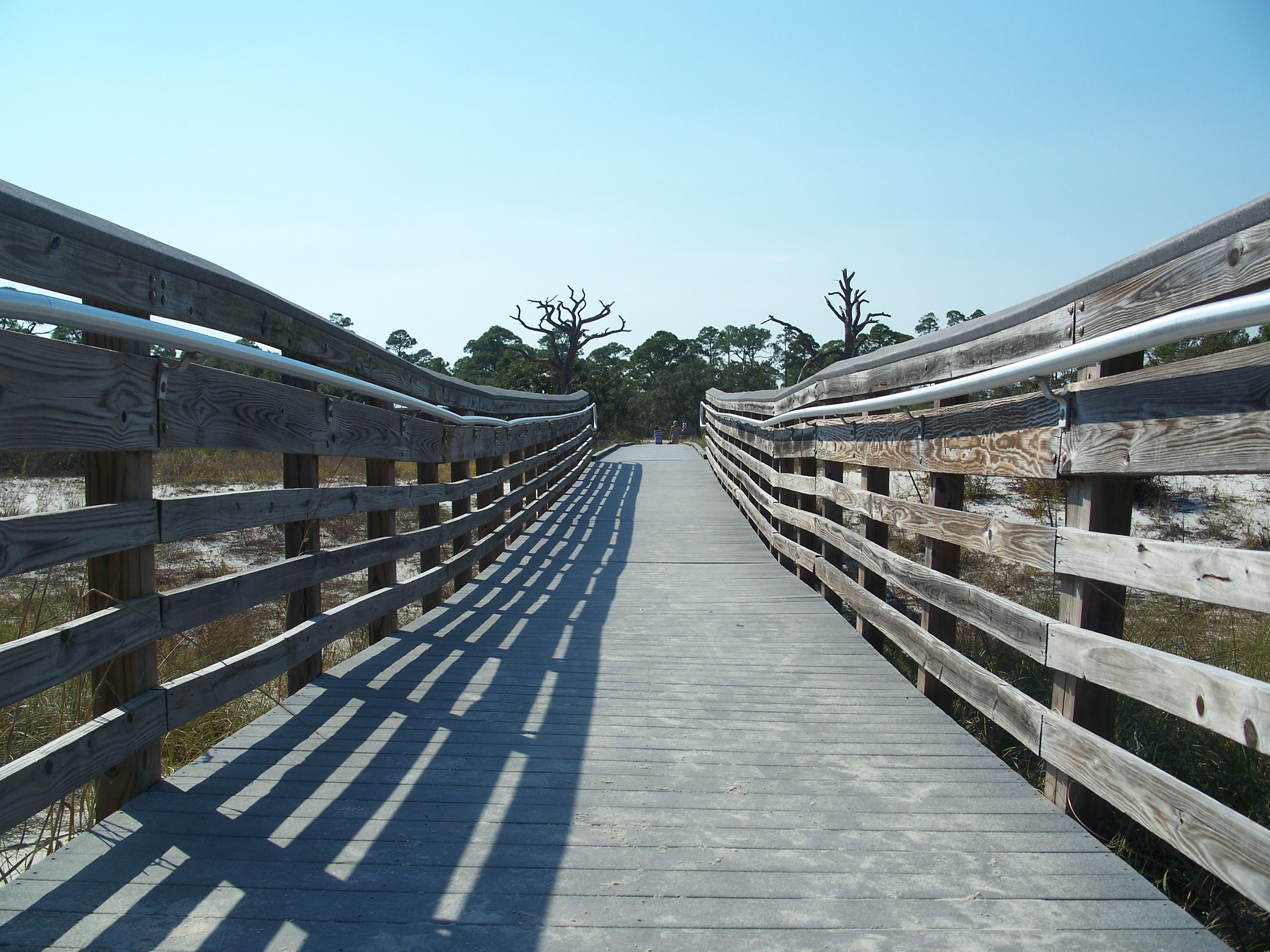

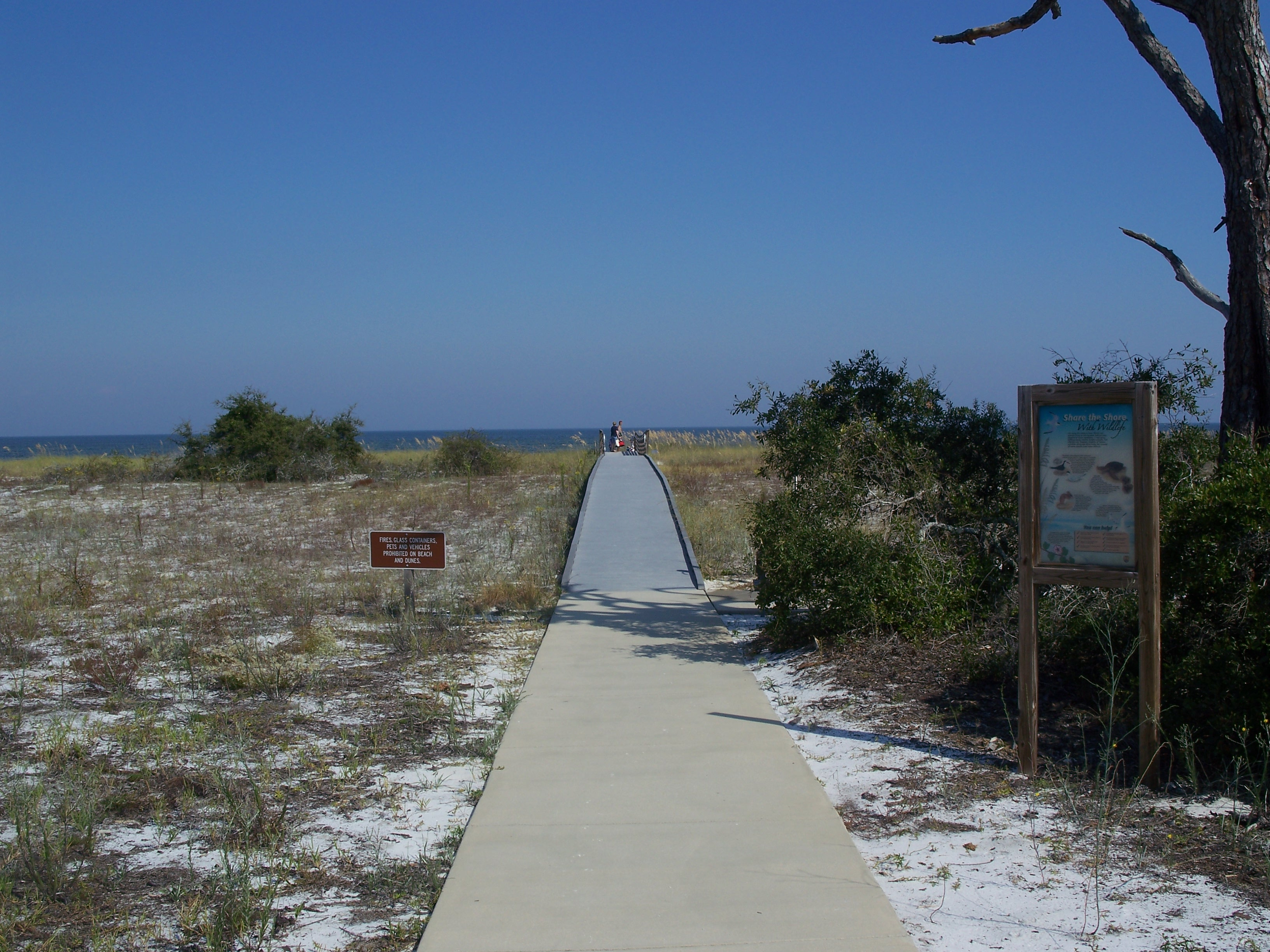

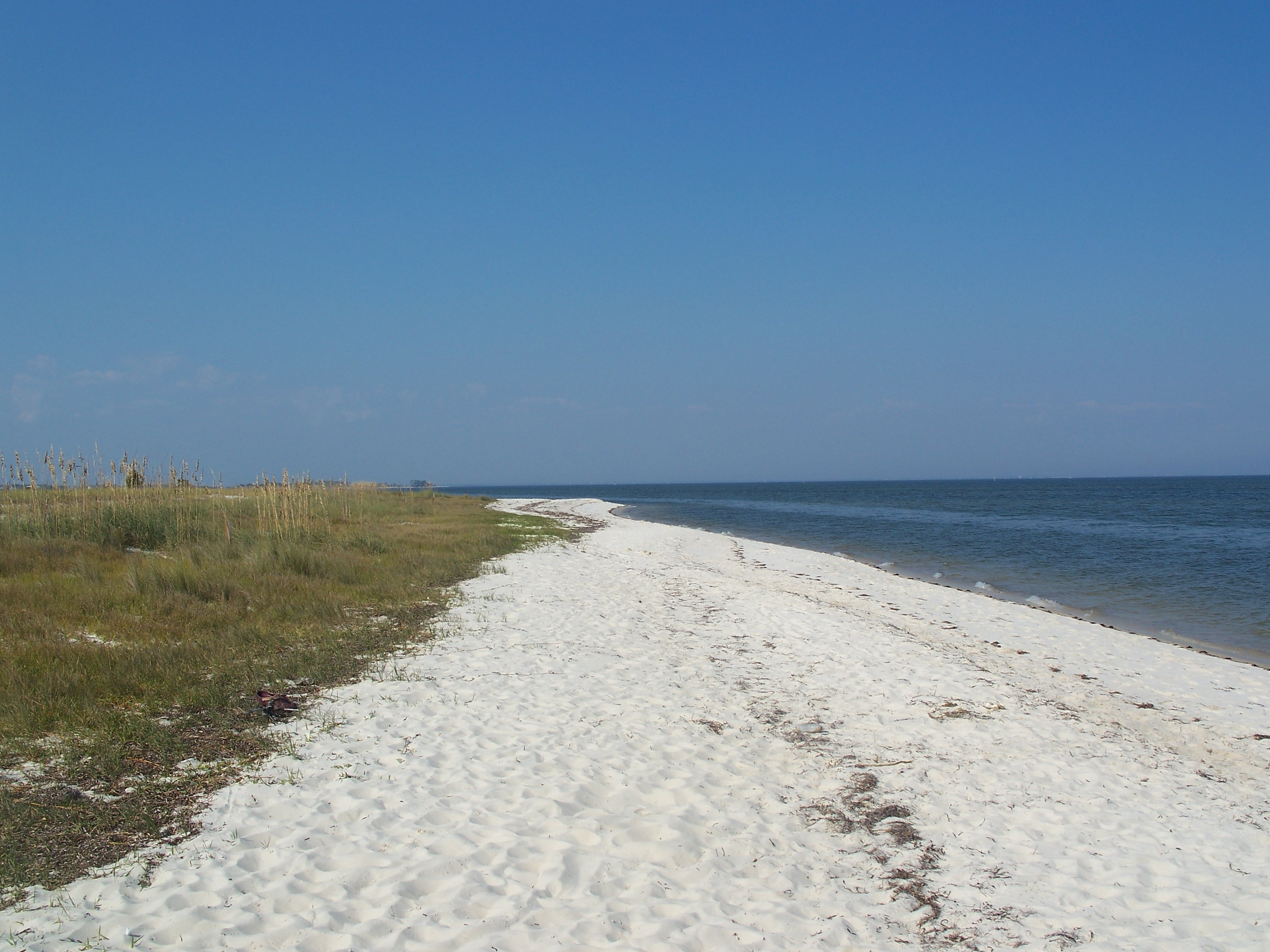

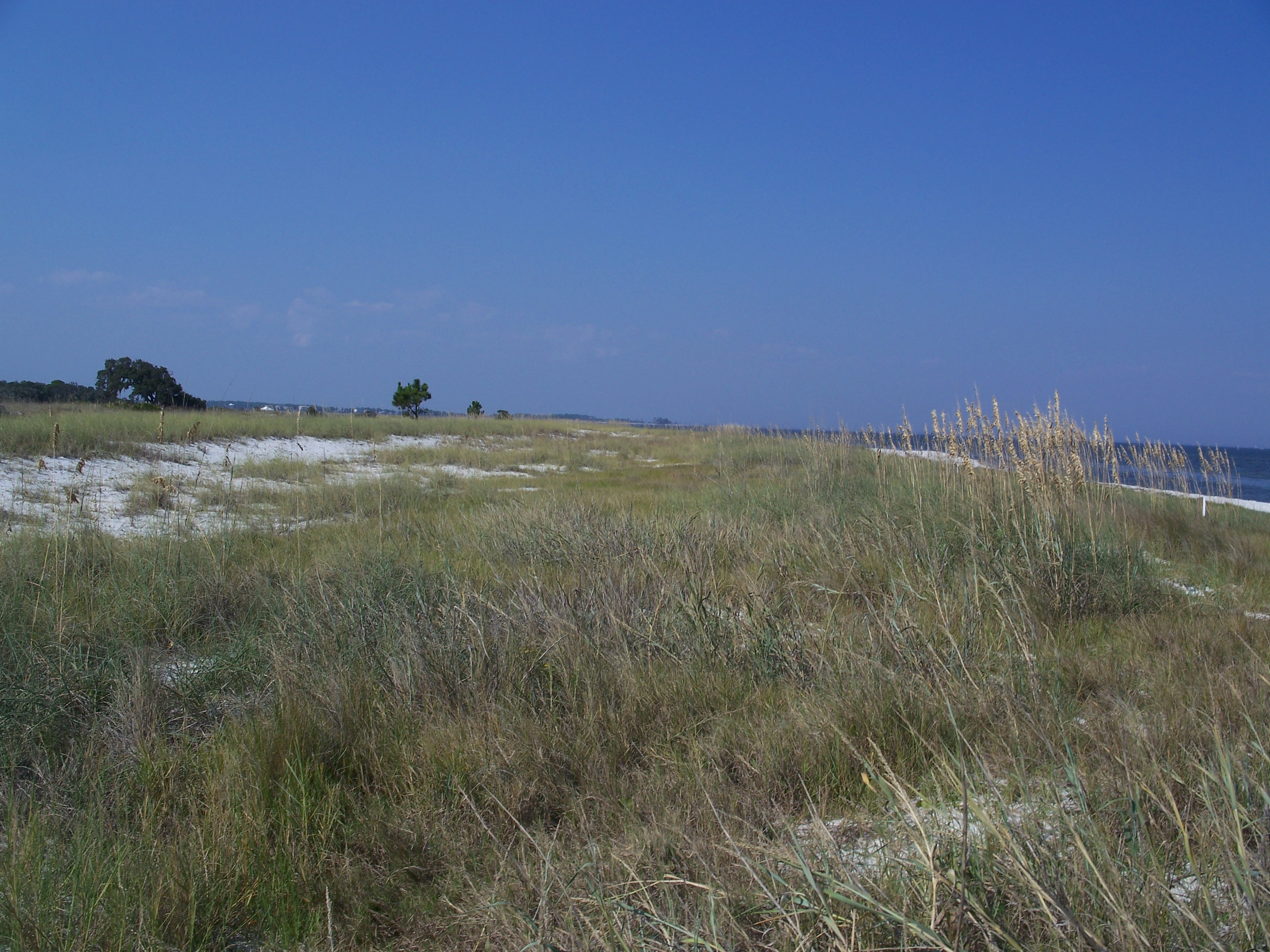

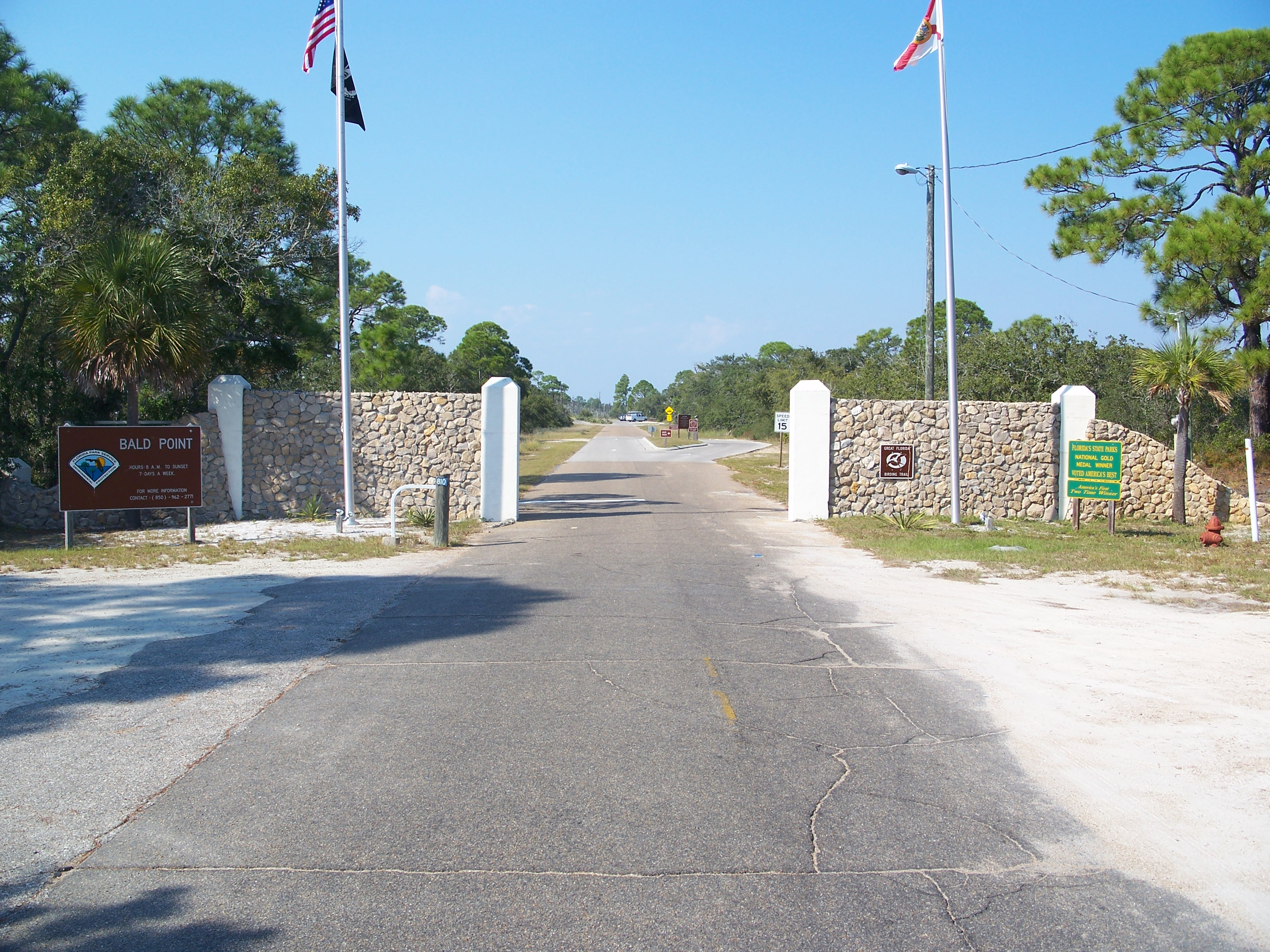

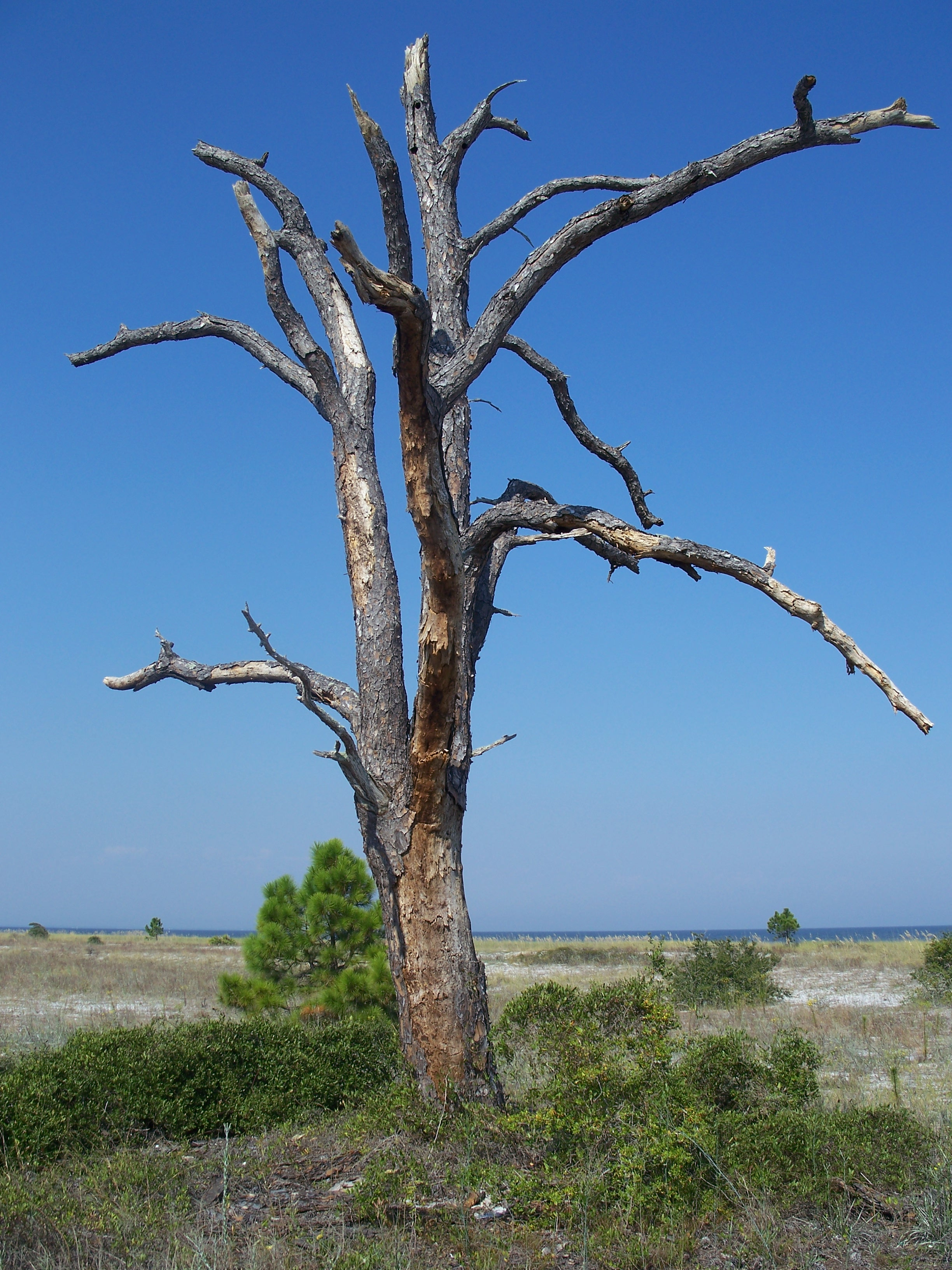
