= Alligator Point, Florida =

Alligator Point
- Unincorporated community
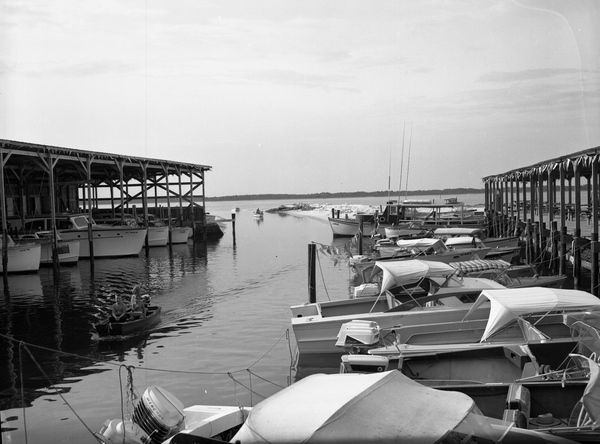
- The Marina at Alligator Point during the 1960s

- Location within Florida
- Coordinates: 29°54′18″N 84°25′01″W
- Country: United States
- State: Florida
- County: Franklin

Government
  - Body: Franklin County, Florida
  - District 2 Commissioner: Bert B. Bolt II

Population (2012)
  - Total: 447
- Rough Estimate; Not Conducted by the U.S. Census
- Time zone: UTC-5 (EST)
  - Summer (DST): UTC-4 (EDT)

Alligator Point is an unincorporated community on St. James Island in Franklin County, Florida, United States. It is located along U.S. 98, south of Bald Point State Park, along the Gulf of Mexico. Alligator Point is a small beach community made up of mostly beach homes and the Alligator Point Yacht Basin. Located on Florida's "Forgotten Coast", nearby attractions include Bald Point State Park and the St. Marks Wildlife Refuge. Alligator Harbor is known for its clam harvesting and was featured on Discovery Channel's "Dirty Jobs."

== Alligator Harbor ==
Alligator Harbor is a shallow, neutral estuary and a barrier spit lagoon. The Harbor is east of the Apalachicola estuary and is enclosed by the Alligator Point sand spit. The harbor is 4 miles long and 1 mile wide with an average low water depth of 4 ft. Because there is little freshwater flowing into the harbor, salinity levels are almost the same as the Gulf of Mexico. The salinity levels allow for the successful clam harvesting industry within the harbor. The bay also contains shallow oyster bars, that contain good fishing areas.

== Alligator Point Taxpayers Association ==
The Alligator Point Taxpayers Association is a group of 5 officers and 10 board members that meets each month to discuss the issues and concerns facing Alligator Point home owners.

== Homes and Development ==
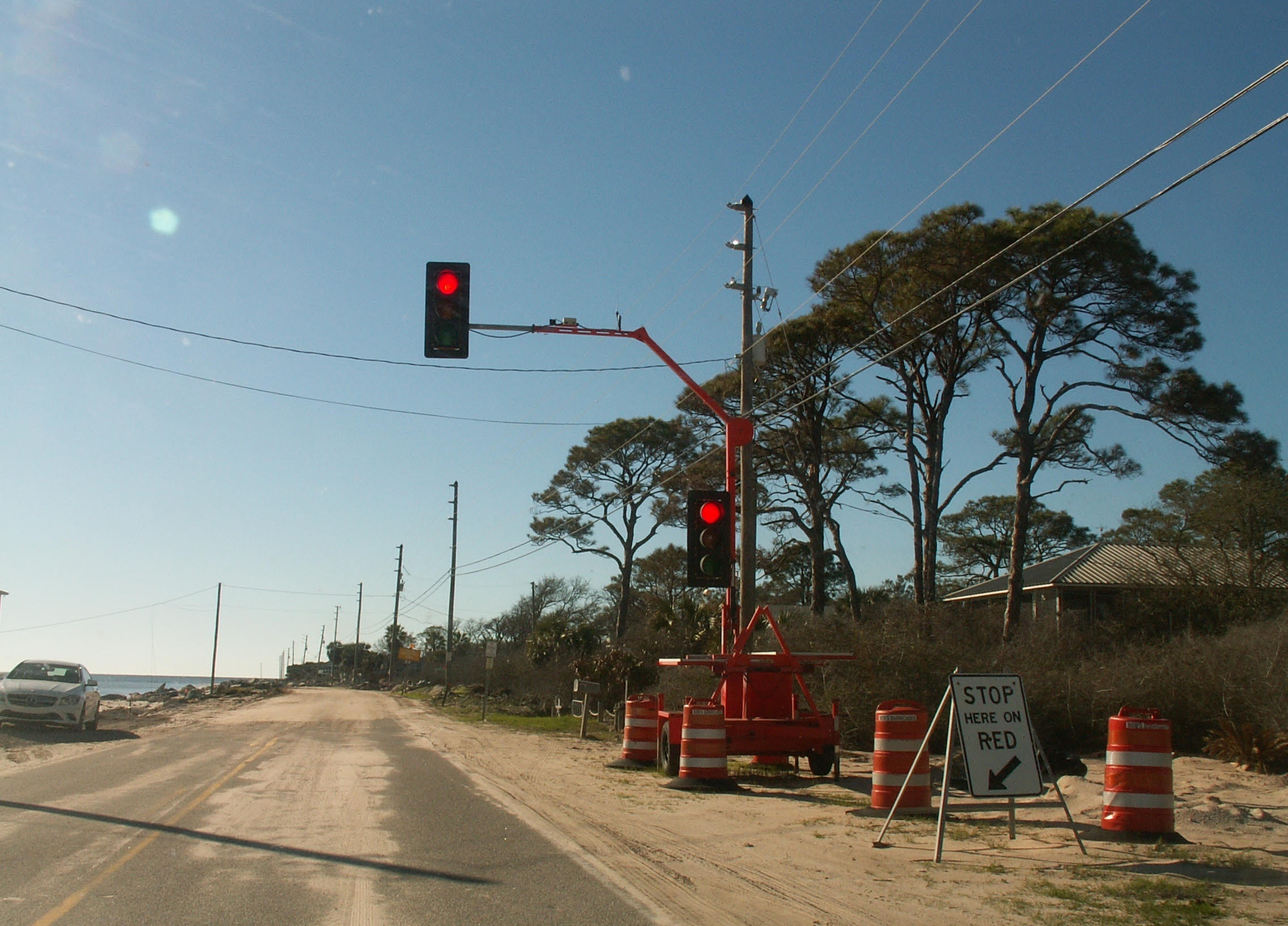
Reconstruction of a road in Alligator Point after Hurricanes Hermine and Michael

Alligator Point contains condos near the marina, and has houses on the bayside and gulf side. Some houses are as old as 70 years. The end of the point is kept as a wildlife refuge for birds and turtles.
