= Camp Gordon Johnston Museum =

Museum in Carrabelle, Florida, US

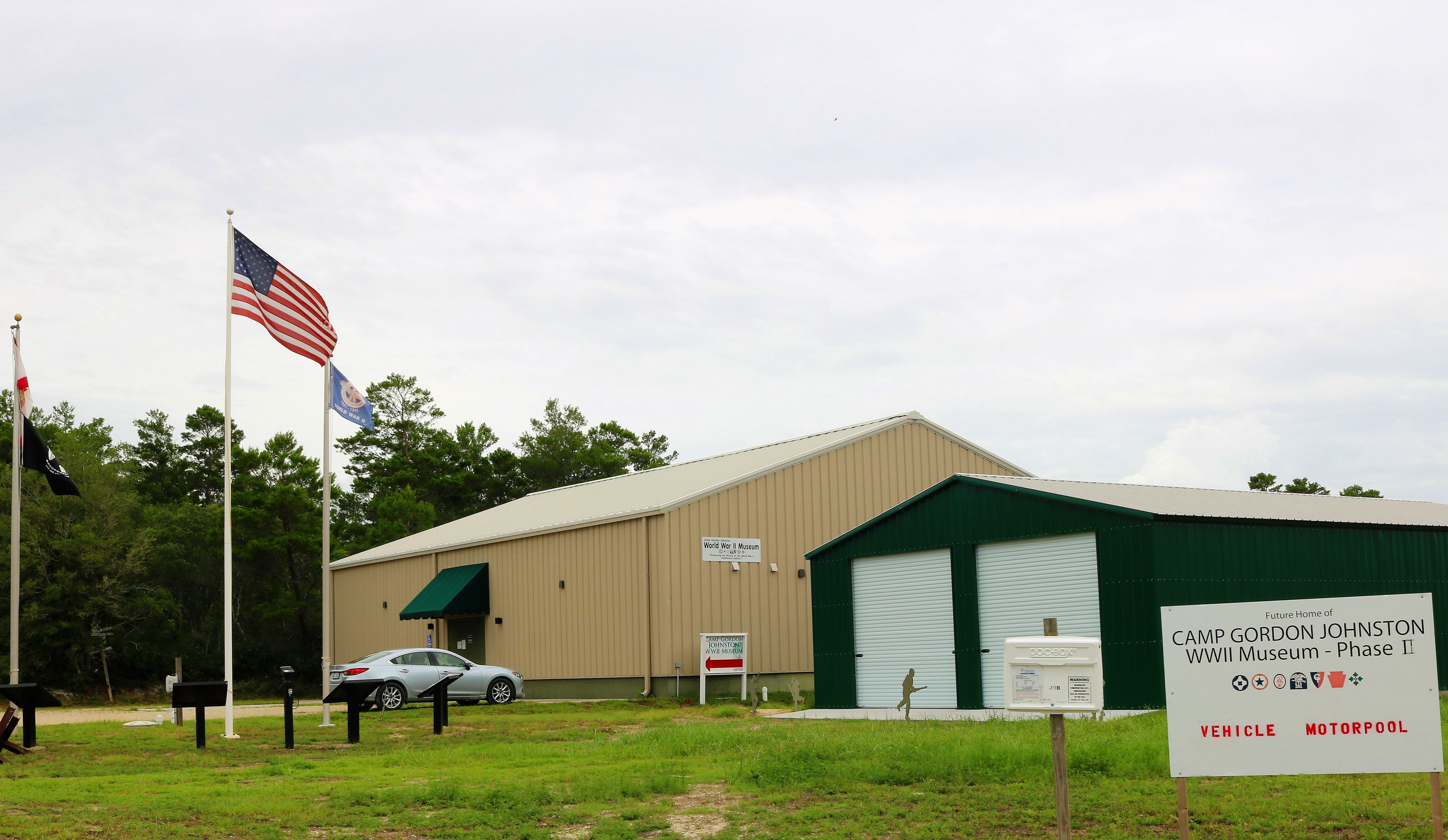
- Camp Gordon Johnston Museum
- Location: Carrabelle, Florida, U.S.
- Coordinates: 29.829579°N 84.693391°W
- Type: Military
- President: Randy Usher
- Owner: Camp Gordon Johnston Association
- Website: www.campgordonjohnston.com

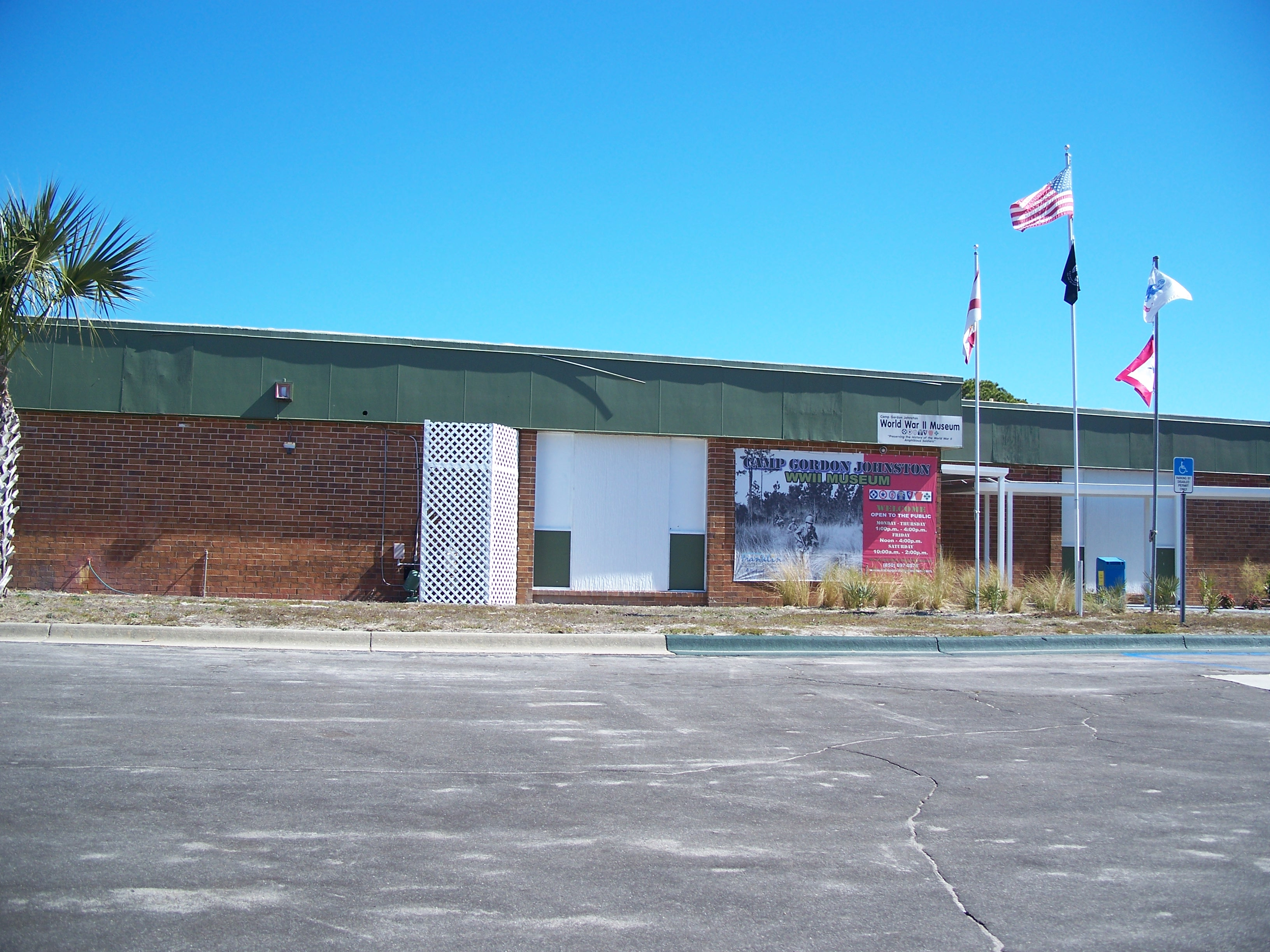
Previous museum site at the Carrabelle Municipal Complex

The Camp Gordon Johnston Museum is a historical museum of World War II history and artifacts. It is located at 1873 Highway 98 West in unincorporated Franklin County, Florida, outside the city limits of Carrabelle, across the highway from Carrabelle Beach, one of the several beaches on which troops practiced amphibious landings. The museum highlights the history of Camp Gordon Johnston, focusing especially on the quarter of a million soldiers who received training in amphibious operation in Carrabelle. The museum's exhibits include vehicles, photographs and thousands of artifacts including uniforms, mess kits and soldiers' war souvenirs. It is open from 11:00 A.M. to 5:00 P.M. on Tuesday through Saturday and it is closed on Sunday and Monday.

The museum is owned by the Camp Gordon Johnston Association, a 501(c)(3) nonprofit organization. Randy Usher serves a president of the Camp Gordon Johnston Association.

Its previous location was the Carrabelle Municipal Complex, which functioned as city hall, and which was formerly the Carrabelle School.
