= Crooked River (Florida) =

Waterway in Franklin County, Florida, US

Coordinates: 29°52′4.7″N 84°40′57.4″W

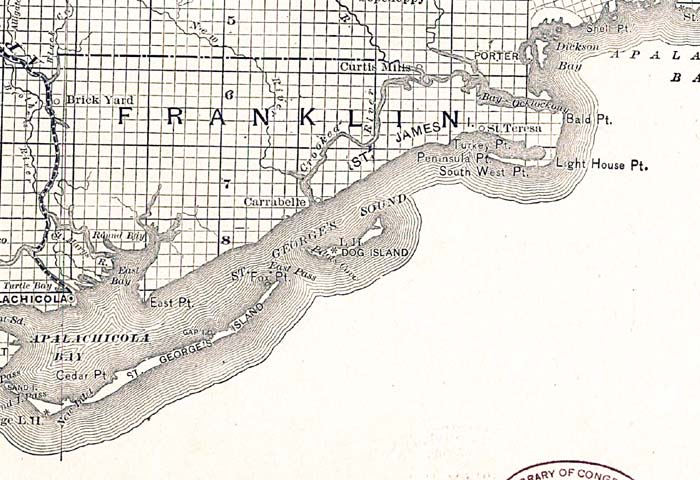
1888 map of Franklin County showing the Crooked River between the Carabelle and Ochlockonee rivers

Crooked River is a waterway in Franklin County, Florida, that connects the tidal estuary of the Ochlockonee River to a junction with the tidal Carrabelle River and the New River above the town of Carrabelle, Florida. The Crooked River channel is 41 kilometres (25 mi) long, while its ends are 24 kilometres (15 mi) apart.

The Crooked River is sometimes described as a principal tributary of the Ochlockonee River, while G.H. Dury described the Crooked River as a tidal channel connecting the Carrabelle River with the Ochlockonee River, separating St. James Island from the mainland.

Segment Five (Crooked River/St. Marks Refuge) of the Florida Circumnavigational Paddling Trail runs through the length of Crooked River.

== Conservation ==
Florida approved the purchase of 13,000 acres of marshland along the Crooked River from St. Joe Company in 2003 for $14.5 million. The preserve was meant to help protect Florida black bear territory. The purchased land was added to Tate’s Hell State Forest.
