= Franklin Correctional Institution =

State correctional institution located in Franklin County, Florida

Coordinates: 29°52′47″N 84°38′45″W

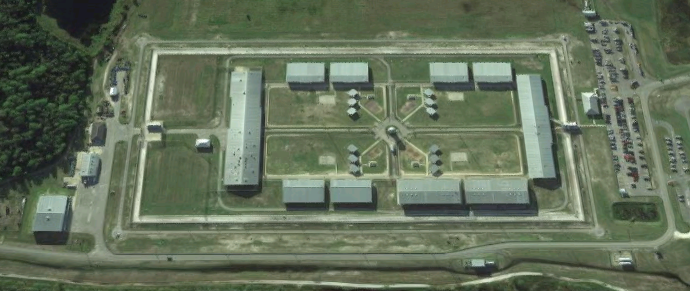
- Aerial view of FCI
- Interactive map of Franklin Correctional Institution
- Location: 1760 Co Hwy 67 Carrabelle, Florida
- Status: Operational
- Security class: Minimum, medium, and close
- Capacity: 1,346
- Population: 1,051 (October 2023)
- Opened: 2005
- Managed by: Florida Department of Corrections
- Warden: Keyanna Shabar Clack

The Franklin Correctional Institution is a state prison for men located in Carrabelle, Franklin County, Florida, owned and operated by the Florida Department of Corrections.

Franklin has a mix of security levels, including minimum, medium, and close. Franklin first opened in 2005 and has a maximum capacity of 1,346 prisoners.

== History ==
Construction first began in 2004, and was estimated to cost $53 million (equivalent to $90,340,909 in 2025).

In 2013, six prisoners were charged with forging release documents for convicted murderers Joseph Jenkins and Charles Walker, who escaped on September 27th and October 8th. The pair were recaptured in Panama City weeks later.

A federal civil rights lawsuit filed in 2016 accused prison guards of beating a prisoner and then fatally gassing him with 600 grams (21 oz) of chemical agents.

The facility was the scene of riots in June 2016. Some three hundred inmates destroyed two housing dorms after drilling through a concrete and brick wall using improvised tools. The prisoners reportedly surrendered after about two hours, and no injuries were reported.

A fourth disturbance occurred in November 2016.
