= Carrabelle, Florida =

- City
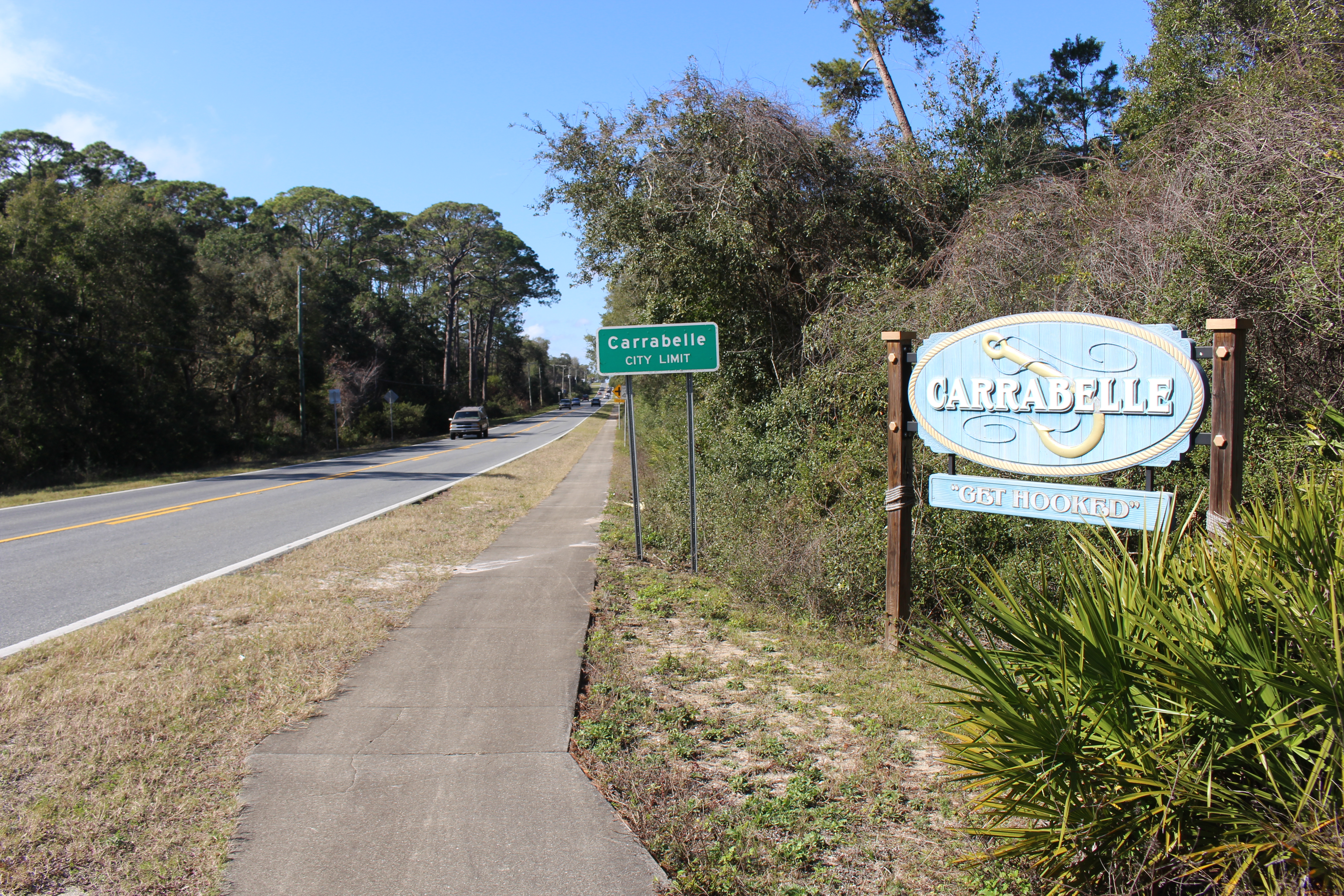
- City entrance sign
- Motto: "Get hooked"
- Interactive map of Carrabelle, Florida
- Location in the United States Carrabelle, Florida (the United States)
- Coordinates: 29°52′06″N 84°39′55″W
- Country: United States
- State: Florida
- County: Franklin
- Settled (Rio Carrabella): 1875
- Incorporated (Town of Carrabelle): December 24, 1881
- Incorporated (City of Carrabelle): May 11, 1893

Government
  - Type: Commission–Manager
  - Mayor: Sebrina Brown
  - Commissioners: Anthony “Tony” Millender, Russell “Keith” Walden, Vance Pedrick, and William “Bill” Gray
  - City Administrator: Courtney Dempsey
  - City Clerk: Keisha Kay Messer
  - City Attorney: Daniel W. Hartman

Area
  - Total: 5.93 sq mi (15.35 km^{2})
  - Land: 4.79 sq mi (12.40 km^{2})
  - Water: 1.14 sq mi (2.95 km^{2})
- Elevation: 26 ft (7.9 m)

Population (2020)
  - Total: 2,606
  - Density: 544.4/sq mi (210.18/km^{2})
- Time zone: UTC-5 (Eastern (EST))
  - Summer (DST): UTC-4 (EDT)
- ZIP Code: 32322
- Area code(s): 850, 448
- FIPS code: 12-10725
- GNIS feature ID: 2403998
- Website: www.mycarrabelle.com

Carrabelle is a city in Franklin County, Florida, United States. It is located east of Apalachicola at the mouth of the Carrabelle River on the Gulf of Mexico, within the Florida Panhandle. The population was 2,606 as of the 2020 census.

== History ==
In 1528, the first Spanish expedition of Pánfilo de Narváez passed through the area on its way from Tampa Bay to the Rio Grande. From the late 17th century through early 18th century, a few passages referring to the area are mentioned. Carrabelle, Dog Island, and St. George Island served as points to stage raids on local ports, as well as San Marcos de Apalache in 1677 and 1682.

In 1875, explorer Nathaniel Holmes Bishop of Medford, Massachusetts, navigated the Crooked River through the lowlands east to the Ochlockonee River. In 1877, Oliver Hudson Kelley from Massachusetts founded the town and named it "Rio Carrabella", after his niece, Caroline Arabella Hall. The following year, the first U.S. post office was established with its address as Rio Carrabella, and Hall served as the community's first postmaster. It was later renamed the "Town of Carrabelle" when it was first incorporated as a municipality on December 24, 1881.

In 1891, the Carrabelle, Tallahassee and Georgia Railroad was established to connect Carrabelle northward through Tallahassee to the Florida-Georgia line, eventually terminating in Augusta, Georgia.

Twelve years after being incorporated as a town, it officially became the City of Carrabelle, when it was chartered and reincorporated by the Florida Legislature on May 11, 1893.

On August 1, 1899, the 2nd hurricane of the season struck the area, almost destroying the town and leaving just nine homes.

In 1942, Camp Gordon Johnston was opened for the purpose of training amphibious soldiers on nearby beaches. The camp trained a quarter of a million men and closed in 1946.

On August 23, 2008, Tropical Storm Fay made its record fourth landfall in the state of Florida at Carrabelle.

== Geography ==
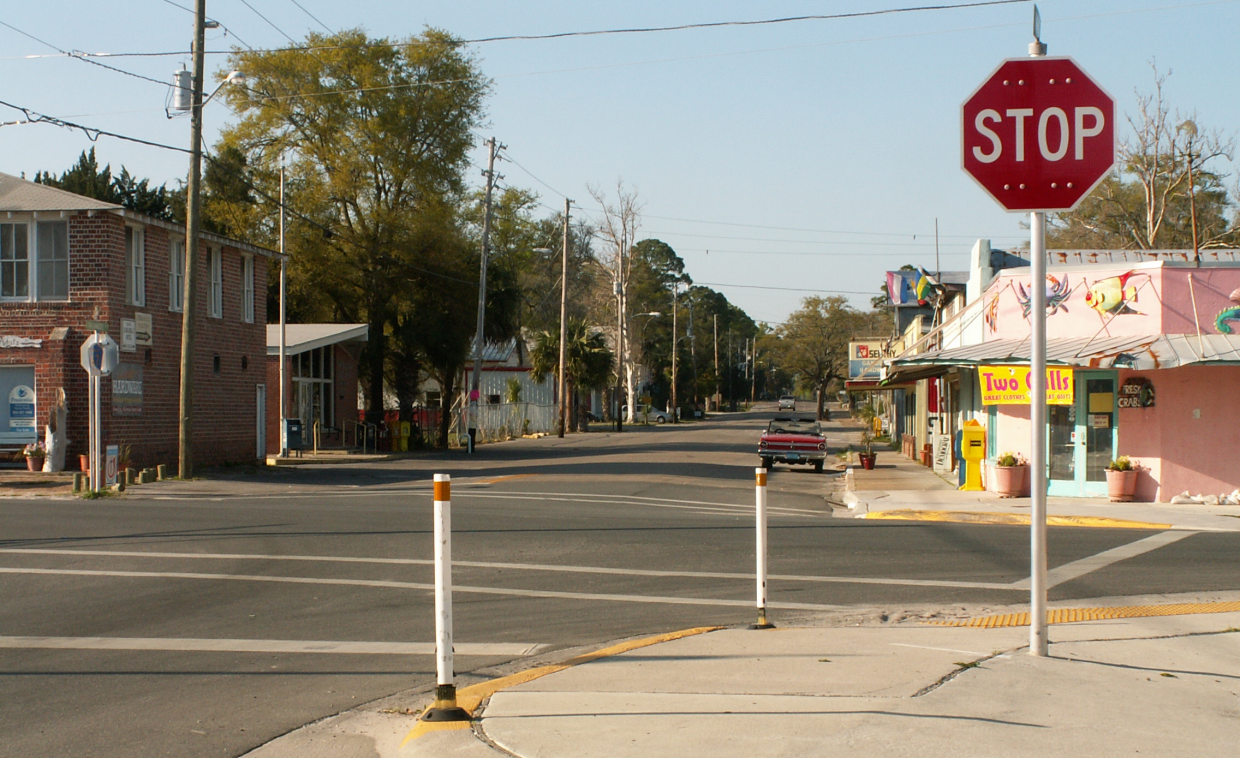
Downtown Carabelle

Carrabelle is located east of the center of Franklin County along the Carrabelle River and on St. James Island, between St. George Sound to the south and both the Crooked River and New River to the north. To the south is Dog Island, separating St. George Sound from the Gulf of Mexico.

U.S. Route 98 passes through Carrabelle, leading west 22 miles (35 km) to Apalachicola and northeast 30 miles (48 km) to Medart. Tallahassee, the state capital, is 54 miles (87 km) to the northeast.

According to the United States Census Bureau, Carrabelle has a total area of 5.6 square miles (14.6 km^{2}), of which 4.5 square miles (11.7 km^{2}) is land and 1.1 square miles (2.9 km^{2}), or 20.12%, is water.

Carrabelle is the eastern terminus of the Gulf Intracoastal Waterway.

=== Climate ===
The climate for the City of Carrabelle is characterized by hot, humid summers and generally mild to cool winters. According to the Köppen Climate Classification system, Carrabelle has a humid subtropical climate zone, abbreviated "Cfa" on climate maps.

== Demographics ==
Historical population
Census	Pop.	Note	%±
1890	482		—
1900	923		91.5%
1910	900		−2.5%
1920	1,055		17.2%
1930	920		−12.8%
1940	1,019		10.8%
1950	970		−4.8%
1960	1,146		18.1%
1970	1,044		−8.9%
1980	1,304		24.9%
1990	1,200		−8.0%
2000	1,303		8.6%
2010	2,778		113.2%
2020	2,606		−6.2%
U.S. Decennial Census

The population of Carrabelle rose from 1,303 in 2000 to 2,778 in 2010 with the expansion of the city limits to the northeast to include the Franklin Correctional Institution.

=== Racial and ethnic composition ===
Carrabelle racial composition (Hispanics excluded from racial categories) (NH = Non-Hispanic)
Race	Pop 2010	Pop 2020	% 2010	% 2020
White (NH)	1,724	1,567	62.06%	60.13%
Black or African American (NH)	754	707	27.14%	27.13%
Native American or Alaska Native (NH)	7	4	0.25%	0.15%
Asian (NH)	11	6	0.40%	0.23%
Pacific Islander or Native Hawaiian (NH)	1	0	0.04%	0.00%
Some other race (NH)	0	16	0.00%	0.61%
Two or more races/Multiracial (NH)	40	77	1.44%	2.95%
Hispanic or Latino (any race)	241	229	8.68%	8.79%
Total	2,778	2,606		

=== 2020 census ===
As of the 2020 census, Carrabelle had a population of 2,606. The median age was 41.2 years. 8.9% of residents were under the age of 18 and 15.5% of residents were 65 years of age or older. For every 100 females, there were 272.8 males, and for every 100 females age 18 and over, there were 307.2 males age 18 and over.

0.0% of residents lived in urban areas, while 100.0% lived in rural areas.

There were 608 households in Carrabelle, of which 21.1% had children under the age of 18 living in them. Of all households, 46.5% were married-couple households, 22.2% were households with a male householder and no spouse or partner present, and 26.8% were households with a female householder and no spouse or partner present. About 32.2% of all households were made up of individuals and 16.9% had someone living alone who was 65 years of age or older.

There were 920 housing units, of which 33.9% were vacant. The homeowner vacancy rate was 4.9% and the rental vacancy rate was 15.1%.

In the 2020 American Community Survey 5-year estimates, there were 300 families residing in the city.

=== 2010 census ===
As of the 2010 United States census, there were 2,778 people, 878 households, and 489 families residing in the city.

=== 2000 census ===
As of the census of 2000, there were 1,303 people, 562 households, and 370 families residing in the city. The population density was 349.2 inhabitants per square mile (134.8/km^{2}). There were 790 housing units at an average density of 211.7 per square mile (81.7/km^{2}). The racial makeup of the city was 91.48% White, 5.68% African American, 0.31% Native American, 0.08% Asian, 0.08% Pacific Islander, 0.84% from other races, and 1.53% from two or more races. Hispanic or Latino of any race were 1.61% of the population.

In 2000, there were 562 households, out of which 26.9% had children under the age of 18 living with them, 48.0% were married couples living together, 12.1% had a female householder with no husband present, and 34.0% were non-families. Of all households 30.6% were made up of individuals, and 12.3% had someone living alone who was 65 years of age or older. The average household size was 2.30 and the average family size was 2.83.

In 2000, in the city the population was spread out, with 23.3% under the age of 18, 7.8% from 18 to 24, 24.1% from 25 to 44, 27.5% from 45 to 64, and 17.3% who were 65 years of age or older. The median age was 41 years. For every 100 females, there were 93.3 males. For every 100 females age 18 and over, there were 92.3 males.

In 2000, the median income for a household in the city was $23,749, and the median income for a family was $27,955. Males had a median income of $26,719 versus $19,018 for females. The per capita income for the city was $14,677. About 14.8% of families and 19.4% of the population were below the poverty line, including 18.9% of those under age 18 and 24.2% of those age 65 or over.

== Government and infrastructure ==
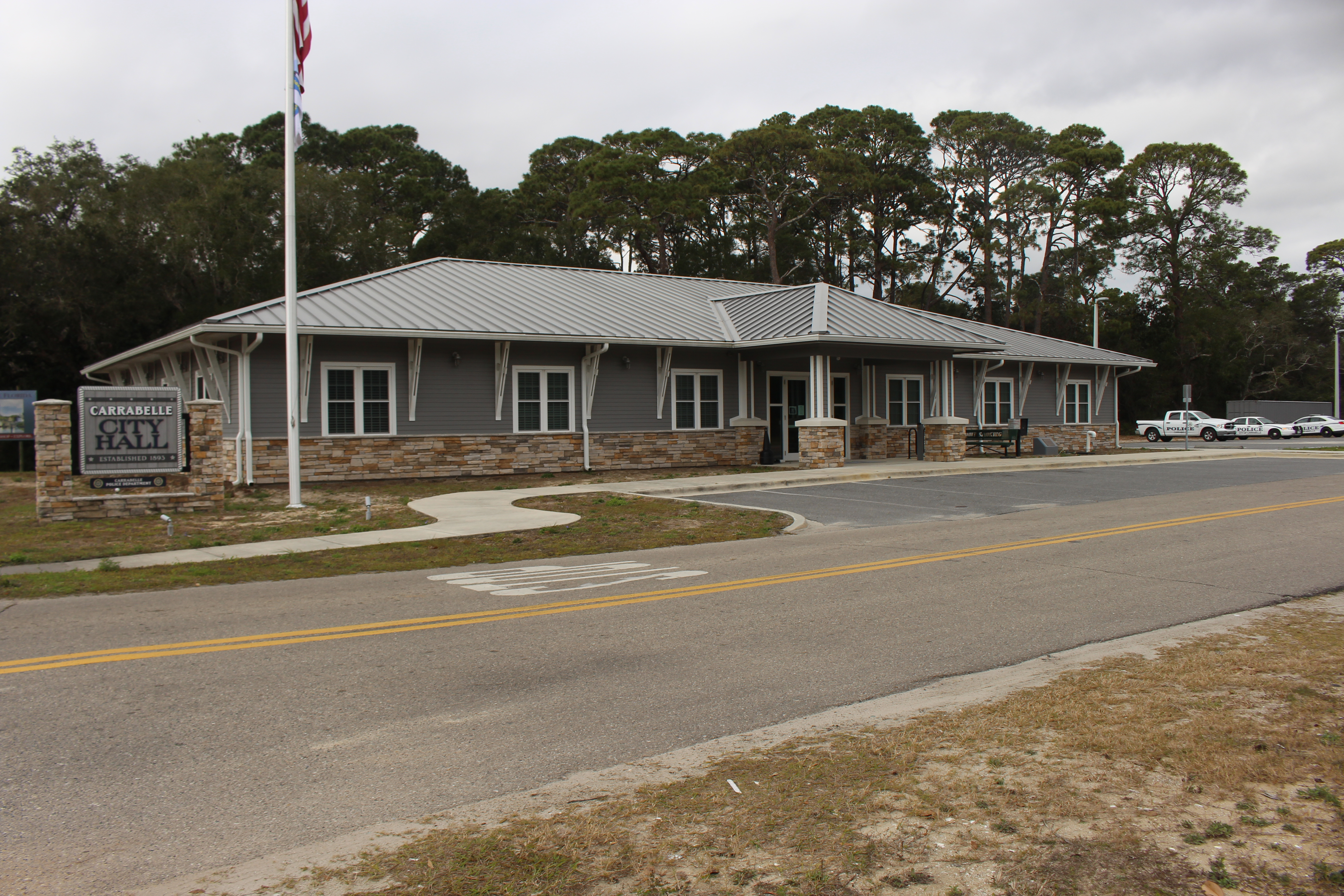
Carrabelle City Hall and Police Department

The current city hall began operations prior to September 30, 2019.

A former city hall facility, which was built in 1938, later became the Carrabelle History Museum, which began operations in April 2009.

Previously the city government used the 60,000-square-foot (5,600 m^{2}) Carrabelle City Complex, which it owned, as its city hall. This facility was formerly used as the Carrabelle School. In 2015 the city government only used about 3,000 square feet (280 m^{2}) of that space for municipal function, while it rented other portions to the Camp Gordon Johnston Museum. That year, Keisha Messer, the city clerk, stated that the city government was considering moving to another space that is less costly to use. After the new city hall opened, the city government no longer used the former city complex.

== Notable people ==
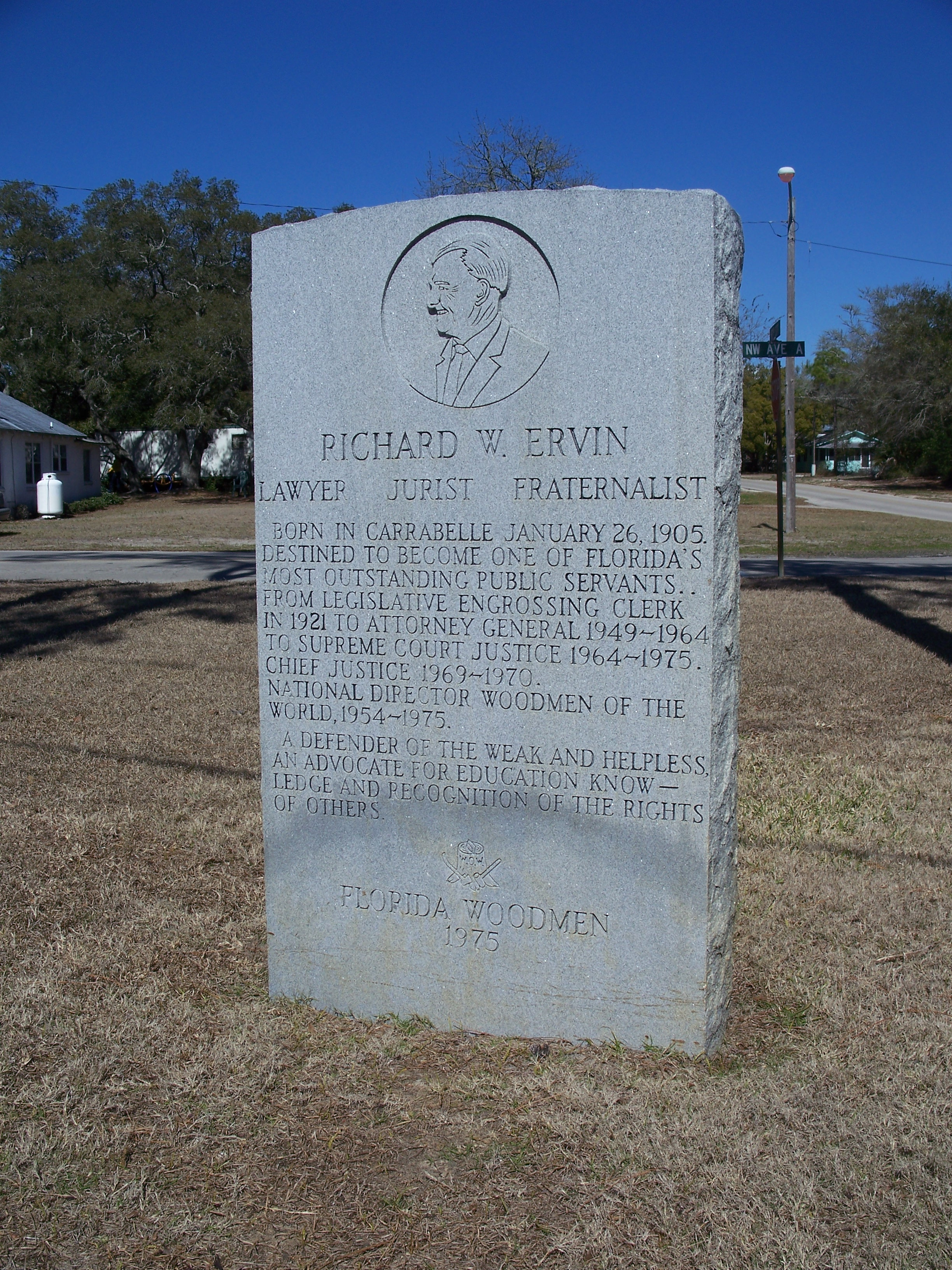
Richard W. Ervin monument in Carrabelle

- Richard W. Ervin, Jr. (1905–2004), was the Florida Attorney General from 1949 to 1964
- Caroline Hall, one of the eight founders of The Grange
- John Jordan "Buck" O'Neil (1911–2006), Negro league baseball player and coach for the Kansas City Monarchs
- John Robinson, aviator
- Jack Rudloe, naturalist and cofounder of the Gulf Specimen Marine Laboratory at nearby Panacea, Florida

== Attractions and geological features ==
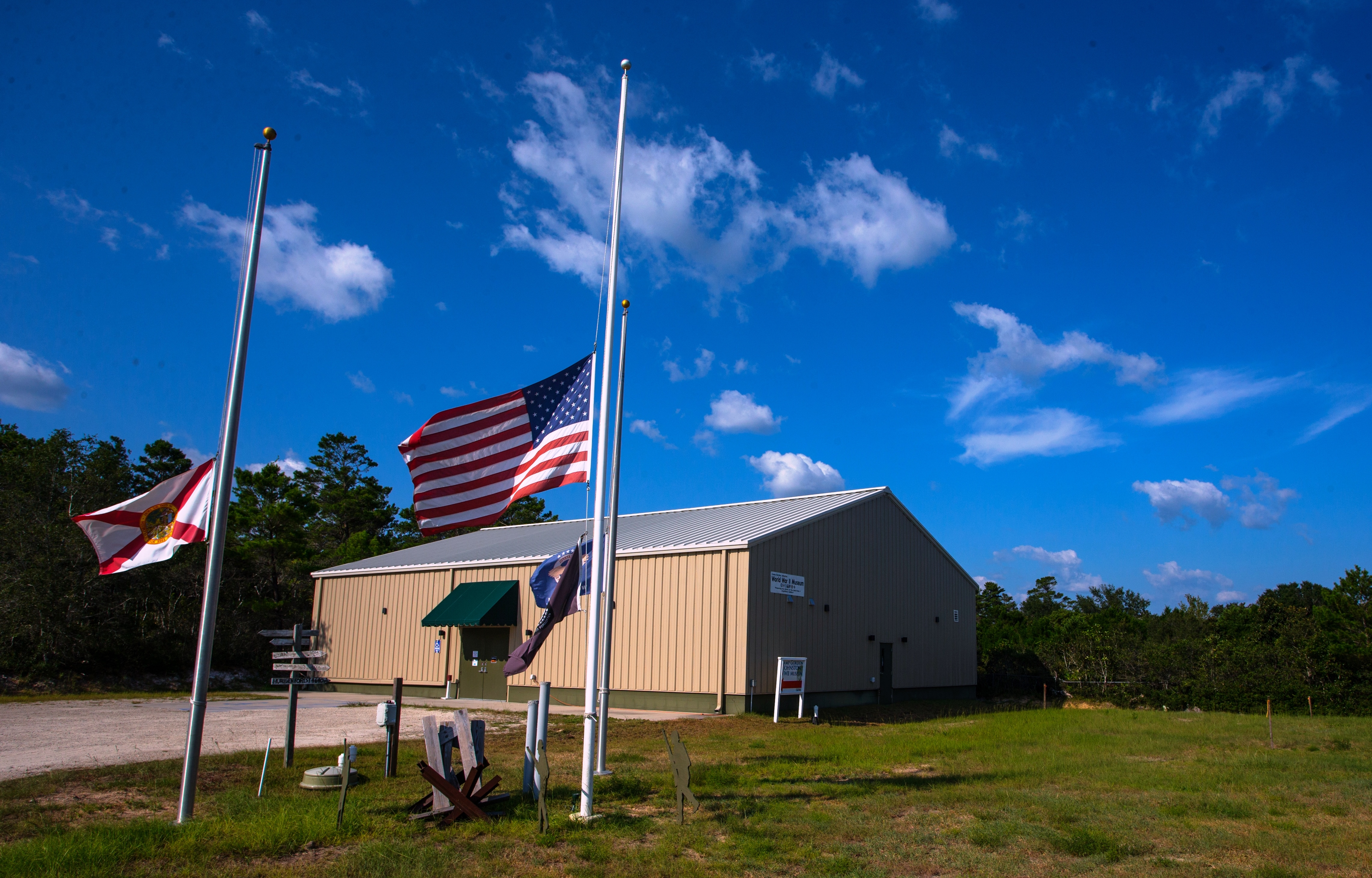
Current photo of the Camp Gordon Johnston WWII Museum across from Carrabelle Beach (the museum moved to a new location in 2018).

- Boat Parade of Lights
- Camp Gordon Johnston Museum
- Carrabelle Beach
- Carrabelle History Museum
- Carrabelle–Thompson Airport
- Carrabelle Riverfront Festival
- Crooked River Lighthouse
- Historic deepwater fishing village
- McKissack Ponds, five small ponds owned by Franklin County, near the Carrabelle–Thompson Airport
- St. James Bay Golf Club
- Tate's Hell State Forest
- Waterway to Dog Island, St George Sound, and eastern start point to the Gulf Intracoastal Waterway
- World's Smallest Police Station

=== World's Smallest Police Station ===
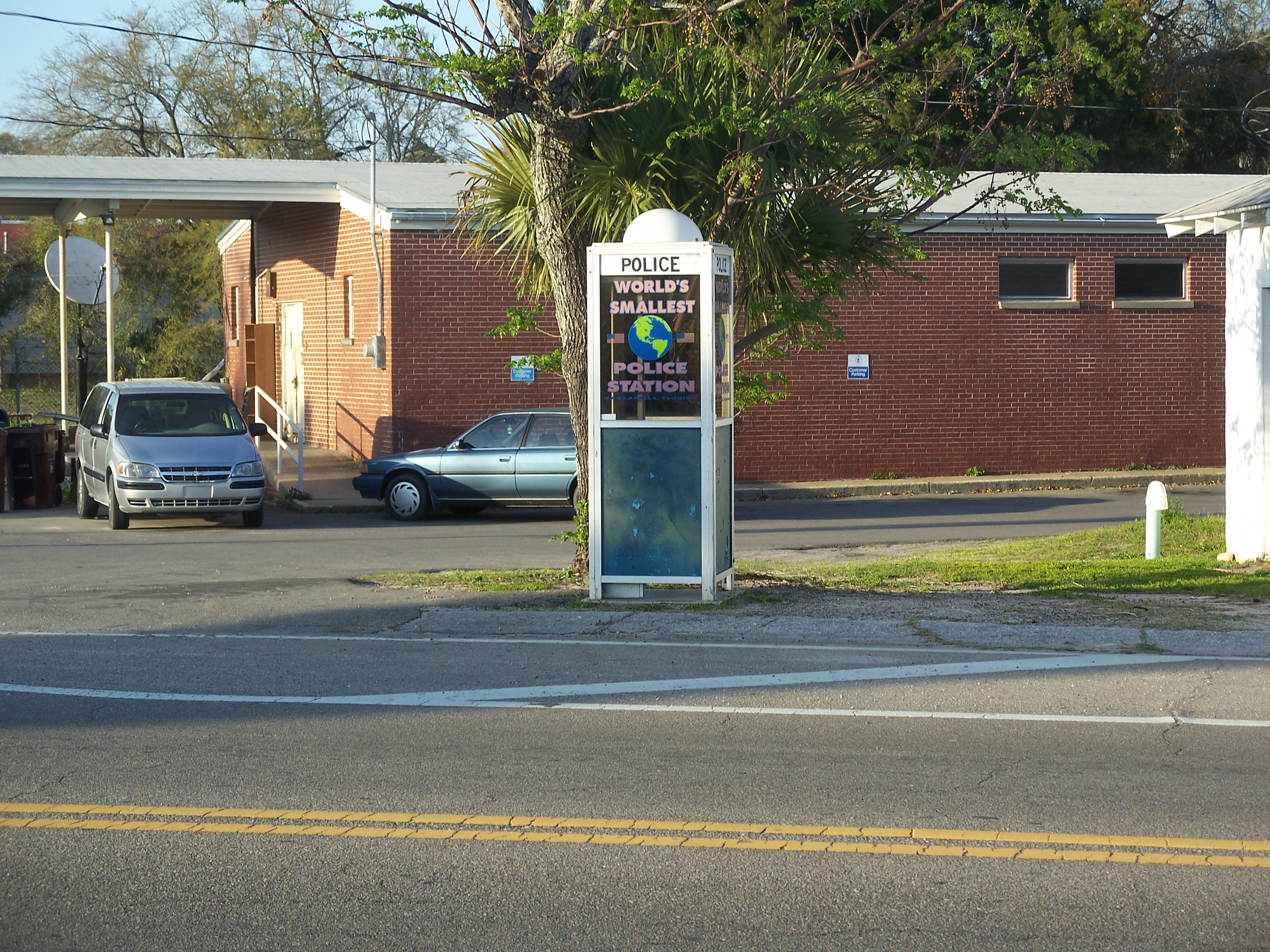
The World's Smallest Police Station

Carrabelle is the home of the "World's Smallest Police Station", which came into being on March 10, 1963. The city had been having problems with tourists making unauthorized long-distance phone calls on its police phone. The phone was located in a call box that was bolted to a building at the corner of U.S. 98 and Tallahassee Street. Johnnie Mirabella, St. Joe Telephone's lone Carrabelle employee at the time, first tried moving the call box to another building, but the illegal calls continued.

Mirabella noticed that the policeman would get drenched while answering phone calls when it was raining. So when the telephone company decided to replace its worn-out phone booth in front of Burda's Pharmacy, he decided to solve both problems at once by putting the police phone in the old booth.

With the help of Curly Messer, who was a deputy sheriff at the time, Mirabella moved the phone booth to its current site on U.S. 98. The booth did protect the officers from the elements, but some people still snuck into it to make long-distance calls. Eventually the dial was removed from the phone, making it impossible for tourists to make calls.

It has been featured on television shows Real People, Ripley's Believe It or Not!, The Today Show, and The Tonight Show Starring Johnny Carson. It was featured in the movie Tate's Hell, which was produced at Florida State University. Along with police station T-shirts—the design is copyrighted—there are police station hats, visors, postcards, and calendars.

But life has not always been easy for the retired St. Joseph Telephone and Telegraph Company phone booth. Vandals have ripped phones out of the booth and shot holes through the glass. It has been knocked over by a pickup truck, a tourist once asked a gas station attendant to help him load it into his vehicle to take it back to Tennessee, and it was knocked over and damaged by Hurricane Kate. Today a replica still stands on the original spot along US Highway 98 in downtown Carrabelle. The original World's Smallest Police Station is safely housed and on display at the Carrabelle History Museum at 106 SE Avenue B.

=== Museums ===
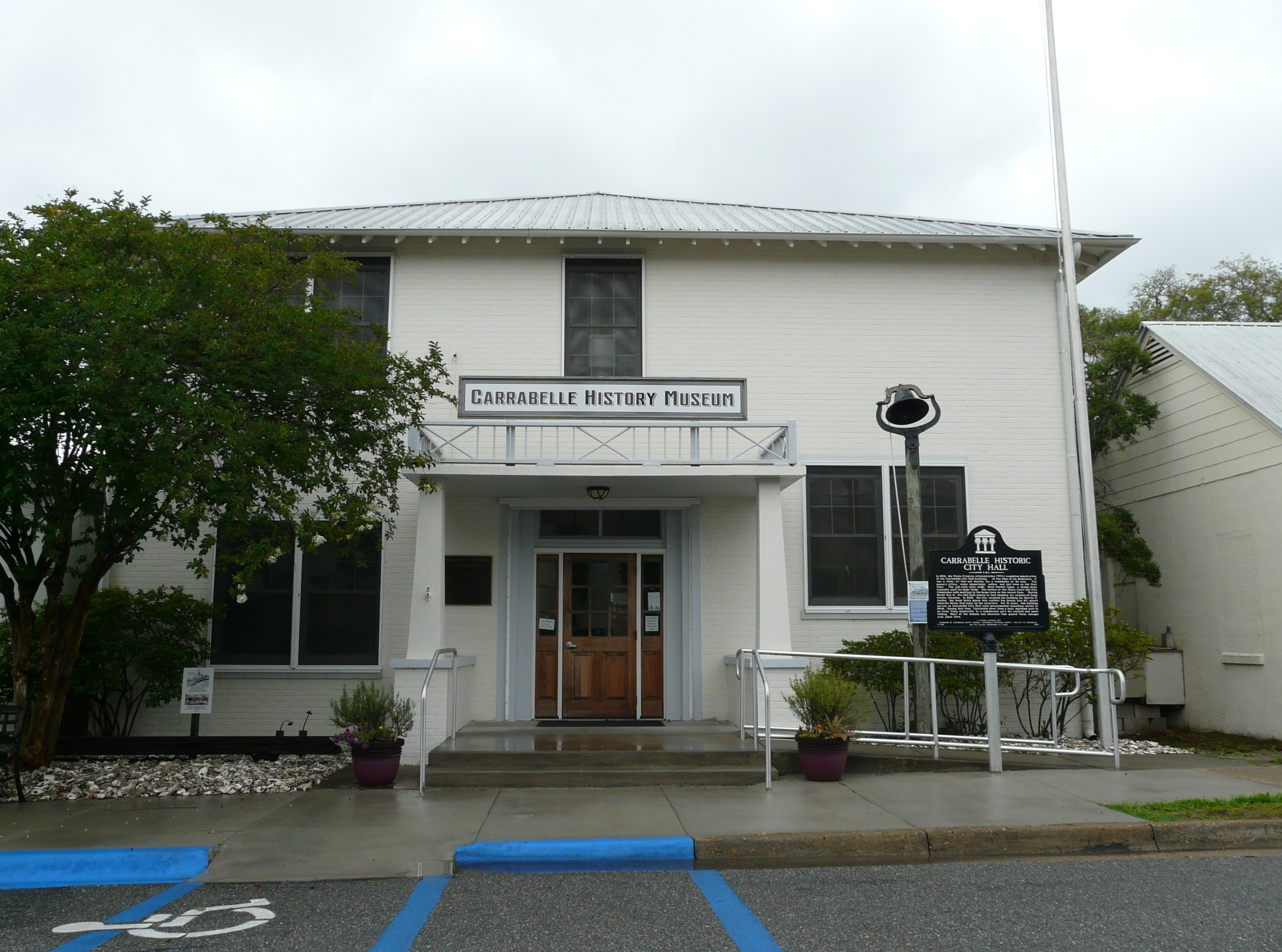
Carrabelle History Museum (old city hall)

Carrabelle has a local history museum, the Carrabelle History Museum, which is located at 106 SE Avenue B, in the historic Marvin Justiss building, also known as "Old City Hall". The museum is free and open on Wednesday and Sunday from 12 pm to 5 pm and on Thursday, Friday and Saturday from 10 am to 5 pm and by appointment other days, for visitors interested in learning about the history and culture of Carrabelle and the surrounding area. The Camp Gordon Johnston World War II Museum is located at 1873 Highway 98 West, across the street from Carrabelle Public Beach, and admission is free. The museum was named after Colonel Gordon Johnston, an American soldier who served in the Spanish–American War, Philippine–American War and World War I.

Crooked River Lighthouse, constructed in 1895, is located 2 miles (3 km) west of town, just past the Carrabelle Beach RV Park. It is the tallest lighthouse on the Forgotten Coast, standing 103 feet tall. The Carrabelle Lighthouse Association manages the Keeper's House Museum and a gift shop.

== Education ==
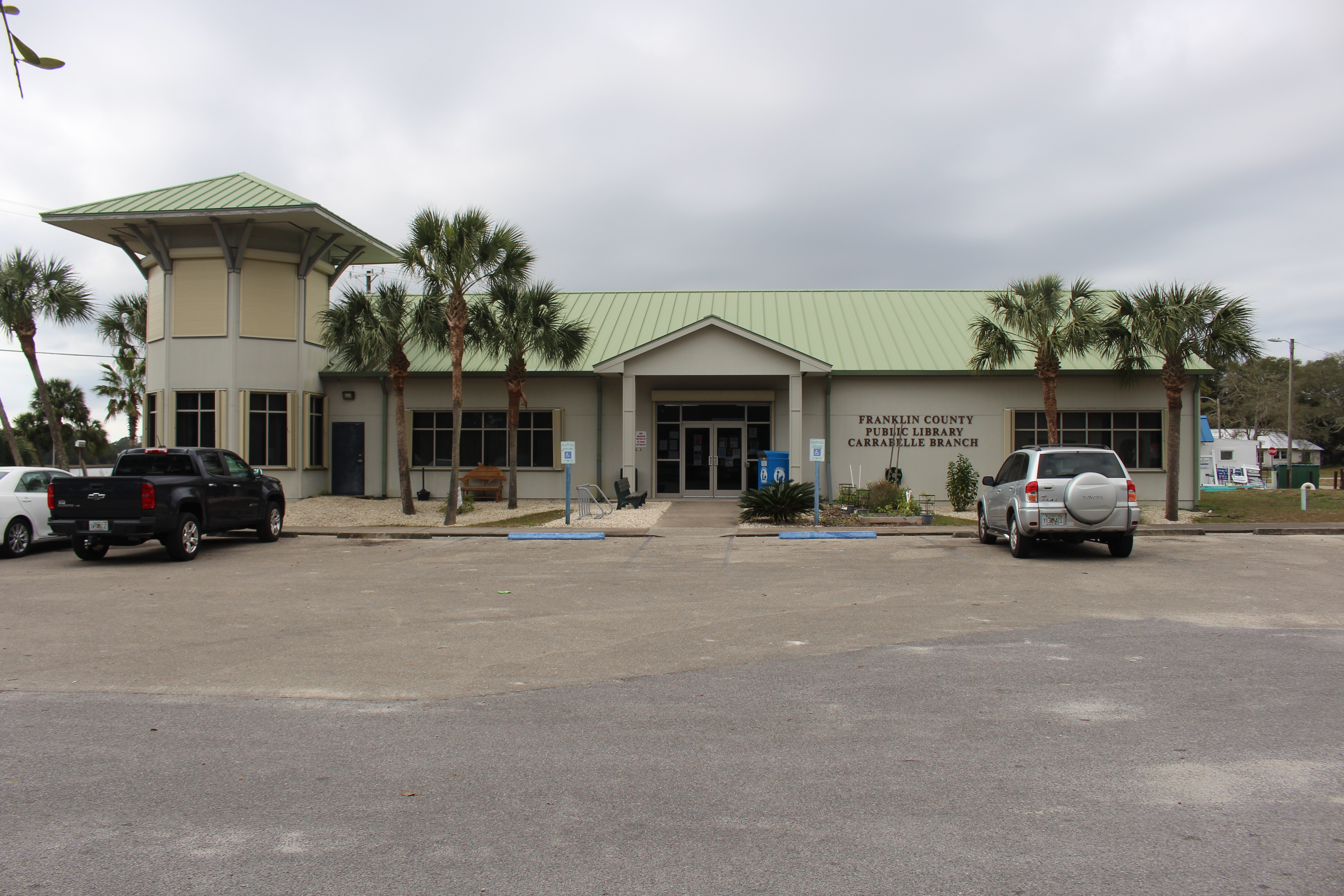
Library

Carrabelle is a part of the Franklin County Schools system. Students attend the Franklin County K–12 School, in Eastpoint, that was built in 2008.

Previously Carrabelle High School was the community's comprehensive high school. The Carrabelle K-12 schools merged with the Apalachicola ones to form the Franklin County School. The former school later was used as a city hall.

In 1972, Carrabelle High had a course on ocean-based careers, called "sea farming".

Franklin County Public Library maintains the Carrabelle Branch.

Gulf Coast State College operates the Gulf/Franklin Campus in Port St. Joe in Gulf County.

== Government and infrastructure ==
Franklin Correctional Institution, a prison of the Florida Department of Corrections, is within the city of Carrabelle.

== Gallery ==
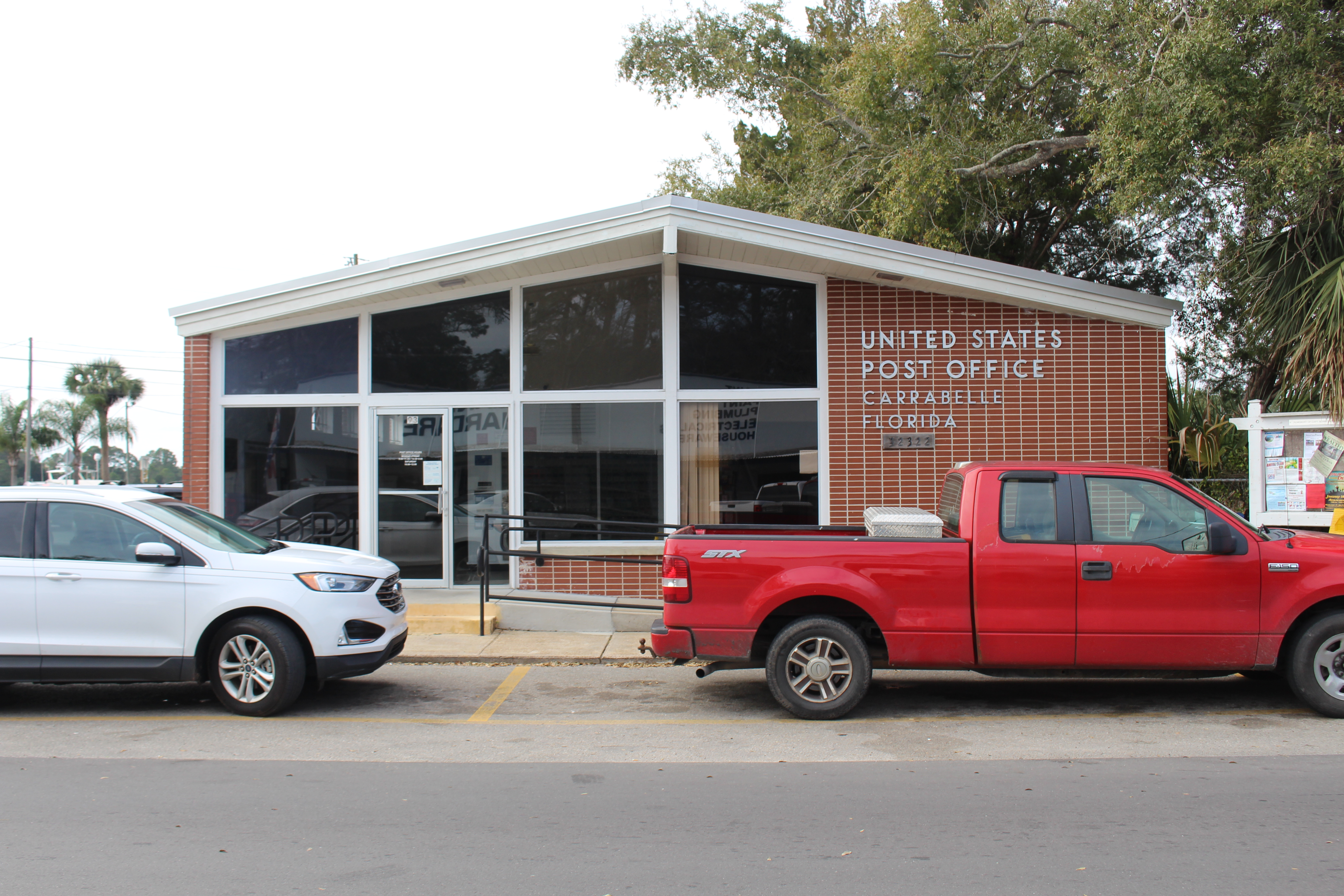
Post office

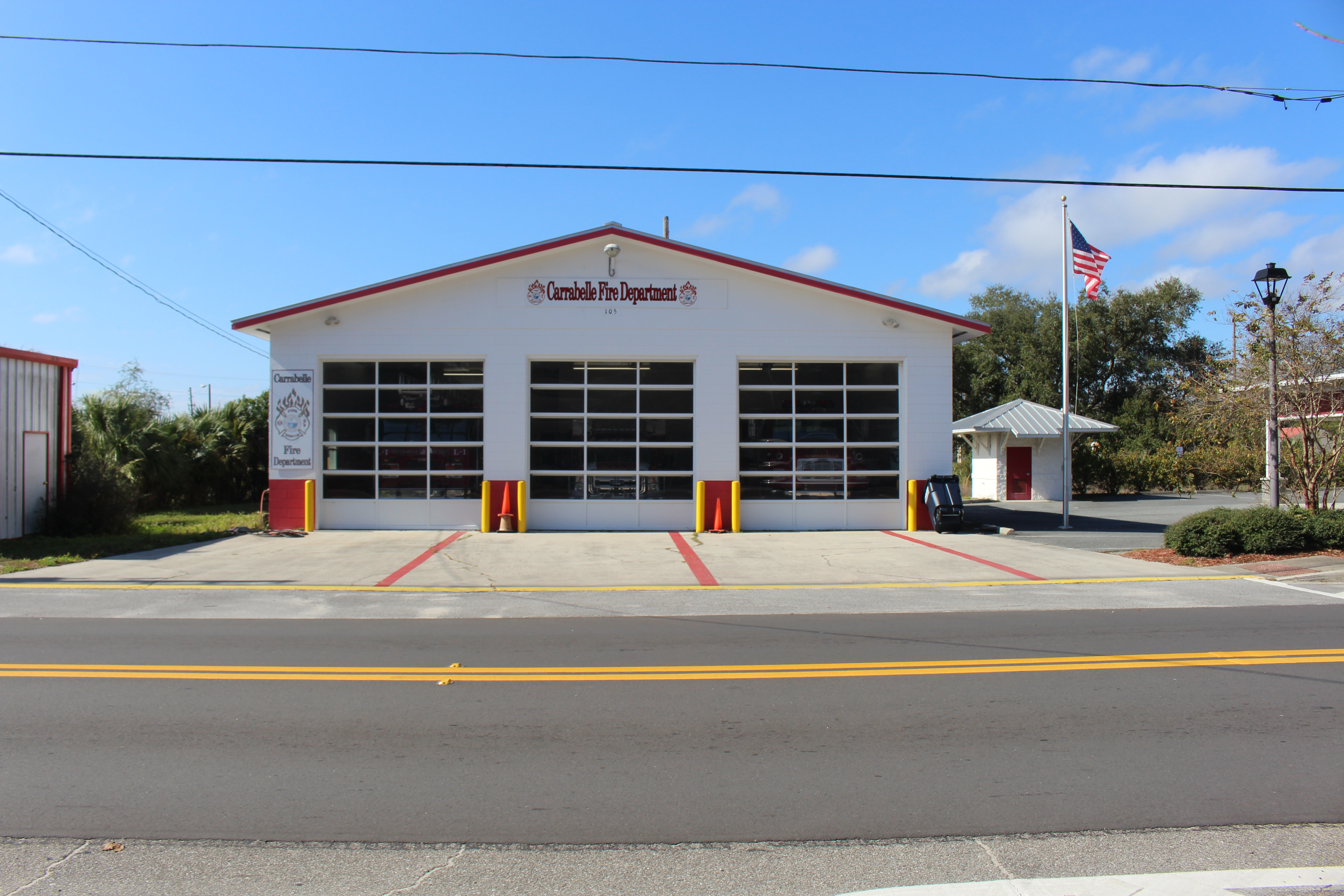
Fire station

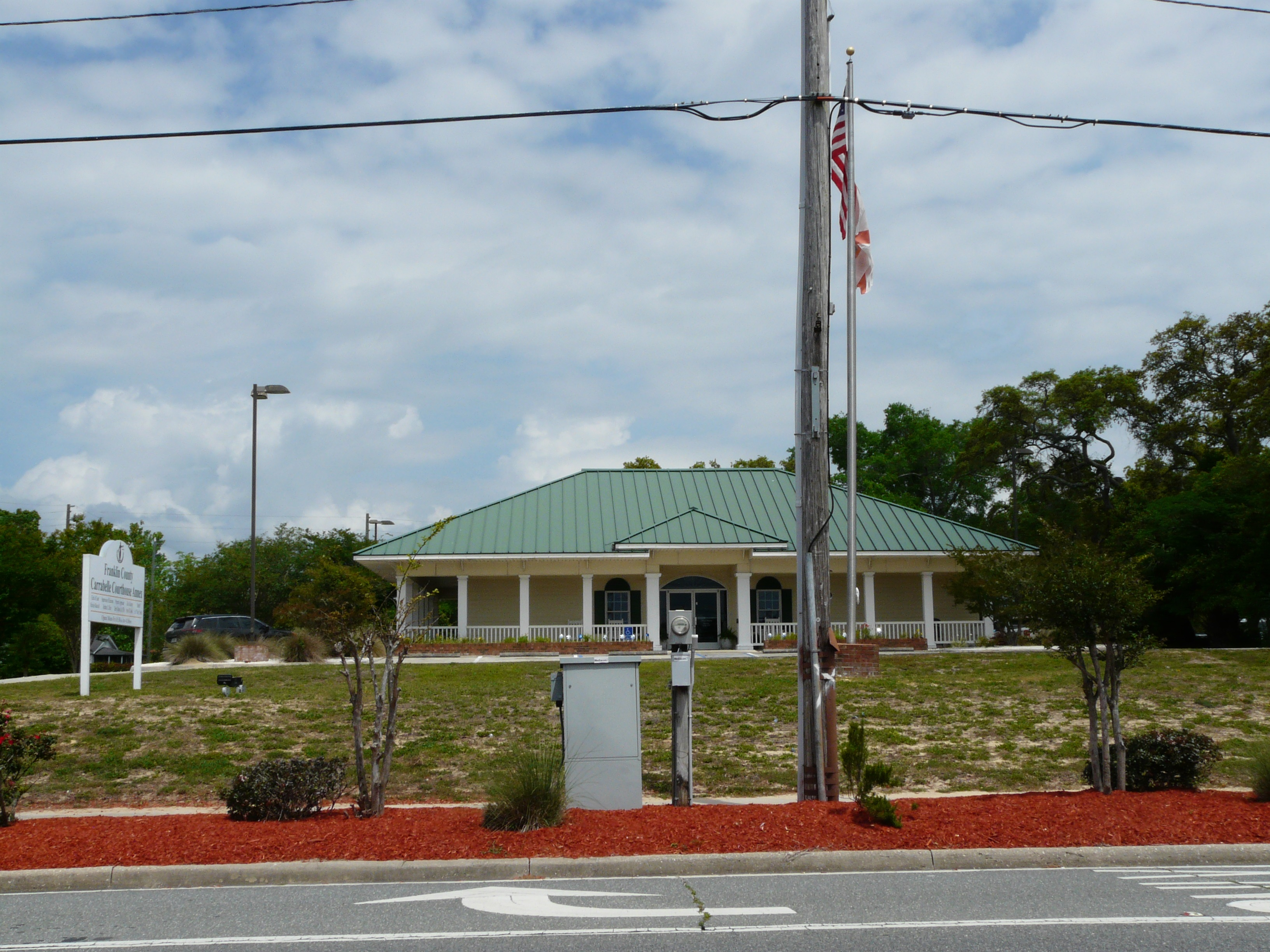
Courthouse annex

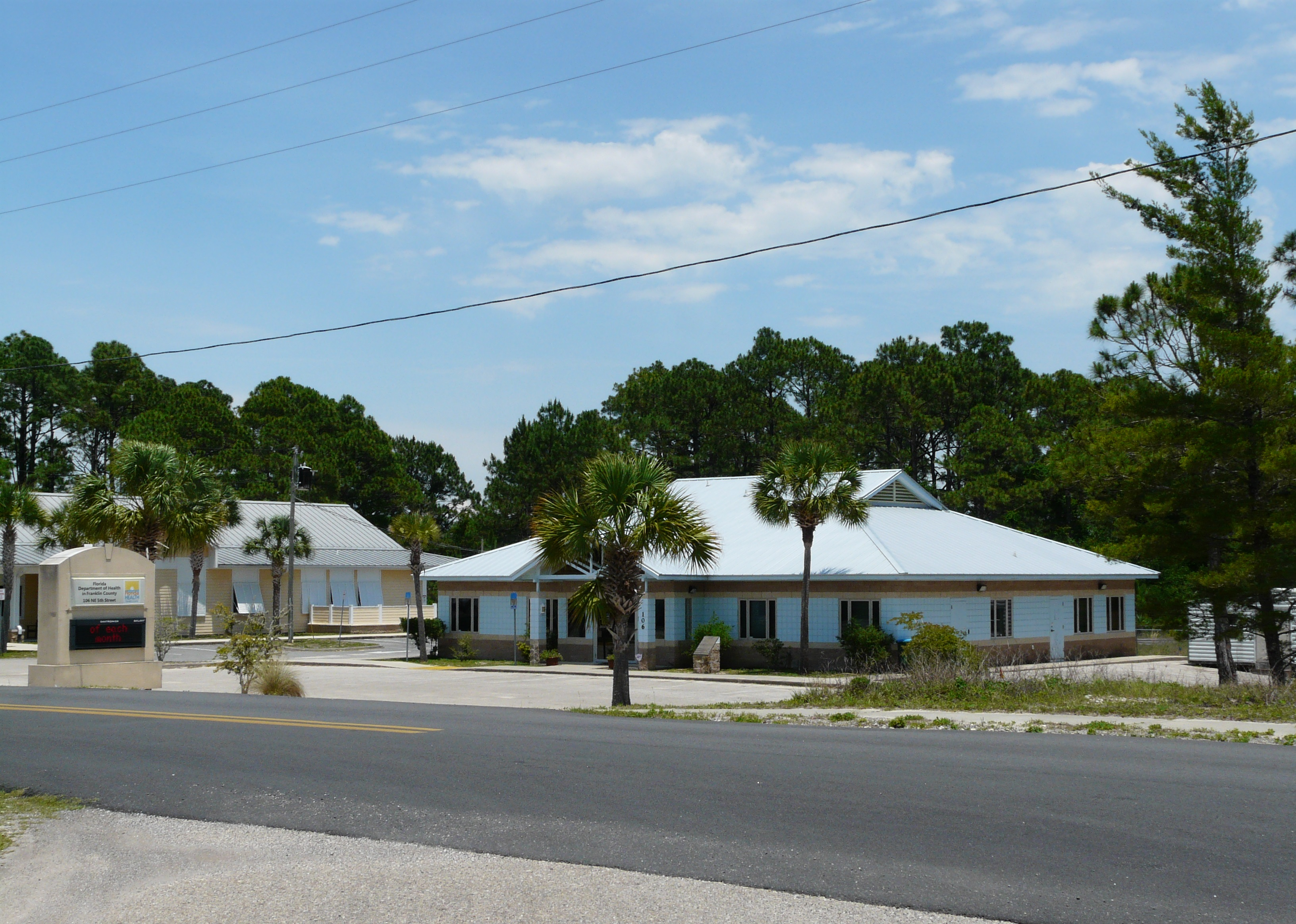
Florida Department of Health facility

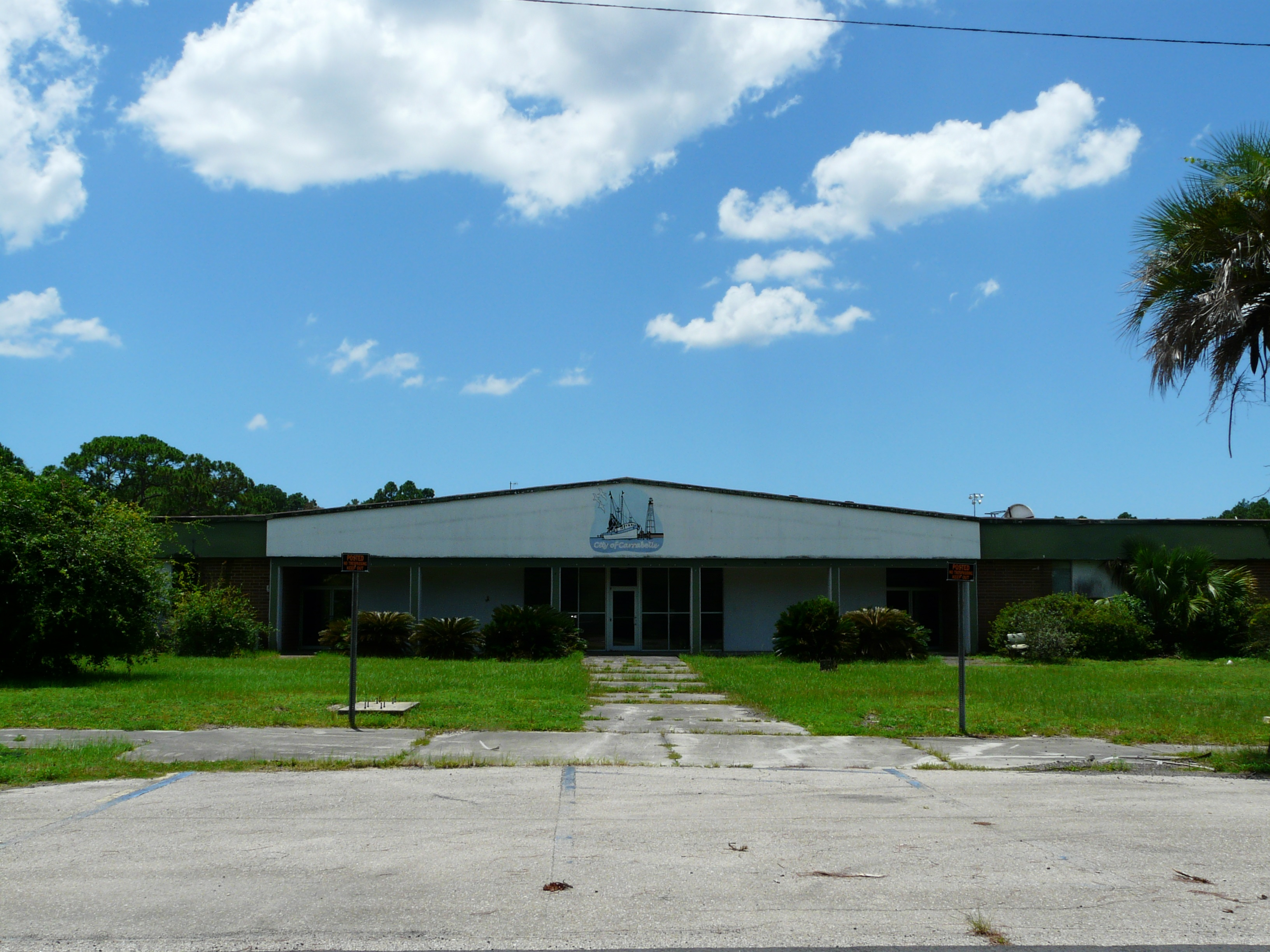
Former City of Carrabelle municipal complex (Also formerly the school of Carrabelle)

== See also ==
- Camp Gordon Johnston
- Crooked River Light
- Florida Panhandle
- Forgotten Coast
- Lanark Village
