= Camp Gordon Johnston =

World War II US Army training center in Florida

Coordinates: 29.9120°N 84.5418°W

- Big Bend, Florida
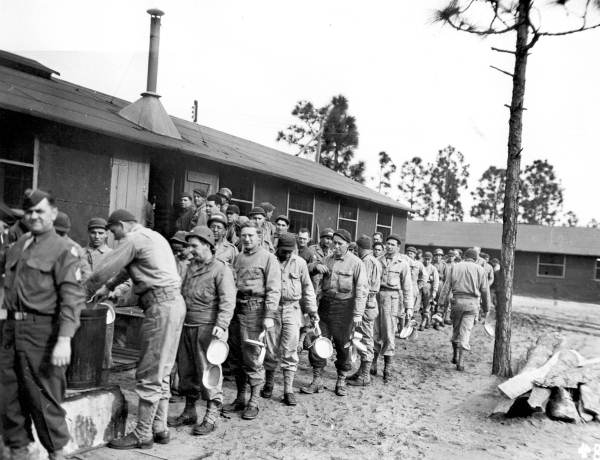
- Soldiers lined up for chow at Camp Gordon Johnston

Site information
- Type: Military training base
- Controlled by: United States Army

Site history
- Built: 1942
- In use: September 1942 – 1946

Garrison information
- Past commanders: Brig. General Frank Keating

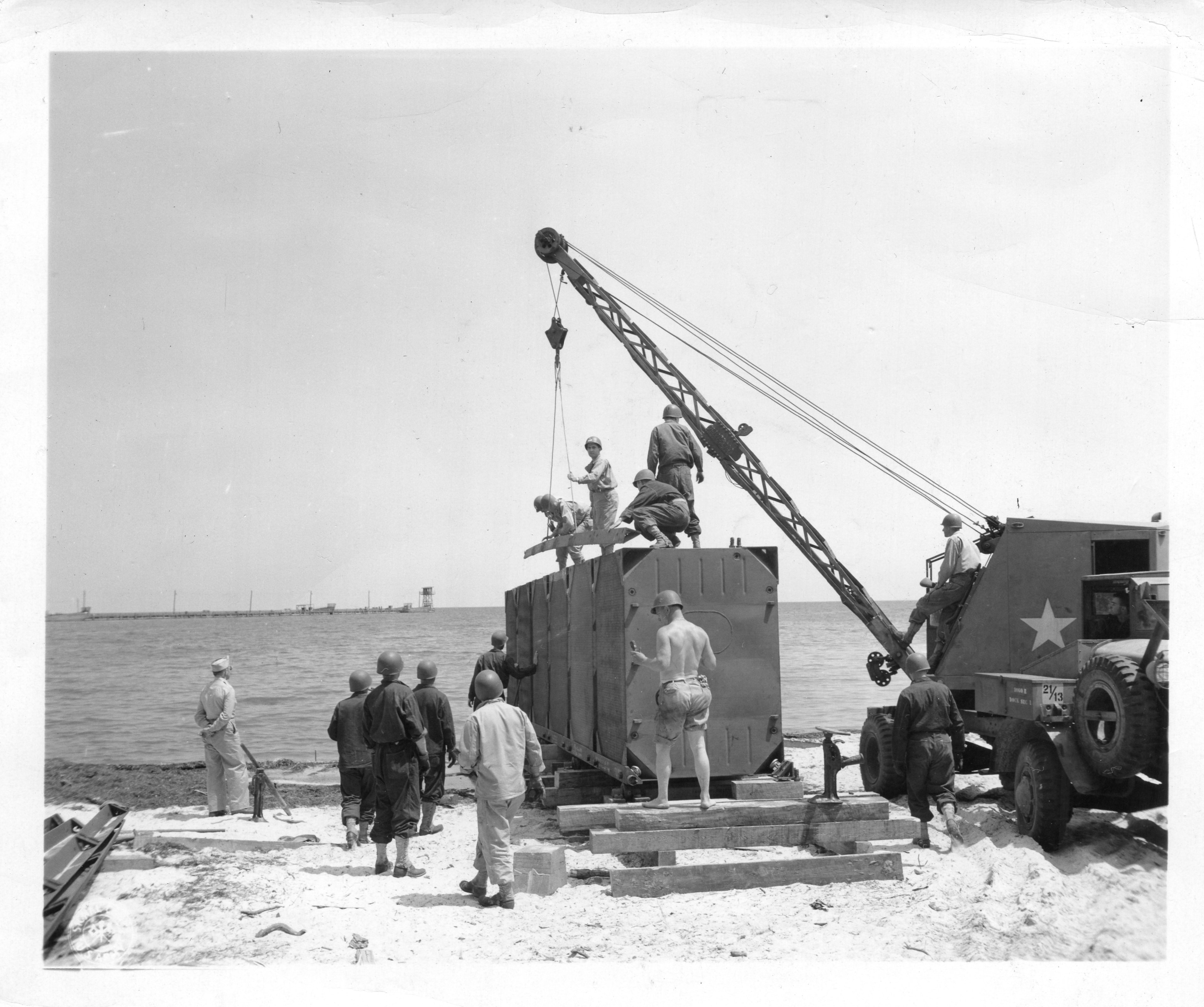
Men of an Engineer Port Construction and Repair Group at ASFTC Camp Gordon Johnston, Florida, build a floating dock from Navy pontoon gear. 9 May 1944.

Camp Gordon Johnston was a World War II United States Army training center located in Carrabelle, Florida, United States. The site's history is featured at the Camp Gordon Johnston Museum.

== History ==
Camp Gordon Johnston opened in September 1942 as Camp Carrabelle and was later named after Colonel Gordon Johnston, a well-decorated soldier who served in the Spanish–American War in Cuba with the Rough Riders, in the Philippine–American War, and in World War I.

The camp at 165,000 acres (670 km^{2}) served as an amphibious training base housing around 10,000 troops at one time and rotating between 24,000 and 30,000 soldiers from 1942 through 1946. The nearby islands of Dog Island and St. George Island were used as landing points for exercises.

== Units ==
Units stationed at Camp Gordon Johnston:

- Hq. & Hq. Company, 3rd ESB
- HQ Medical Detachment
- 1061st Port Construction and Repair Group
- 1463rd Engineer Maintenance
- 563rd Engineer Boat Maintenance
- 375 Transportation Corps Harbor Craft
- 22nd Infantry, 4th Infantry Division
- 105th Harbor Craft Training Reg. & Coast Guard Detachment
- 332nd, 339th, 352nd, 353rd, 356th, 376th, 377th Harbor Craft
- 534th, 544th, 593rd, 584th EB & SR
- 815th, 816th, 817th, 818th and 820th Amphibious Truck Companies.
- Engineer Special Brigades
- Amphibious Training Center
- 534th Scouts
- 351st 5th Platoon

In 1946, many buildings, facilities and the land was sold as war surplus. Officers quarters later became the retirement community of Lanark Village. Live munitions had been used in exercises, as well as dummies. In 2001, a U.S. Army Corps of Engineers found that specially trained technicians were needed to clear certain areas that had been sold into private hands.
