= New River (Carrabelle River tributary) =

River in the Florida Panhandle, United States

Coordinates: 29°51′54″N 84°40′54″W

New River is in the Florida Panhandle. It originates in the far north of the Apalachicola National Forest and joins with the Crooked River (Florida) above Carrabelle, Florida to become the Carrabelle River, which opens onto St. George Sound and the Gulf of Mexico. The New River watershed drains a large part of Liberty County, Florida with the Apalachicola River to the west and the Wakulla River to the east.

New River is used by paddlers south of Carr Bridge along a corridor of the Mud Swamp/New River Wilderness and, year-round, further south where it is wider with fewer obstructions. It leaves the national forest and enters Franklin County, Florida, passing through Tate's Hell State Forest.
