= Tate's Hell State Forest =

Florida protected area

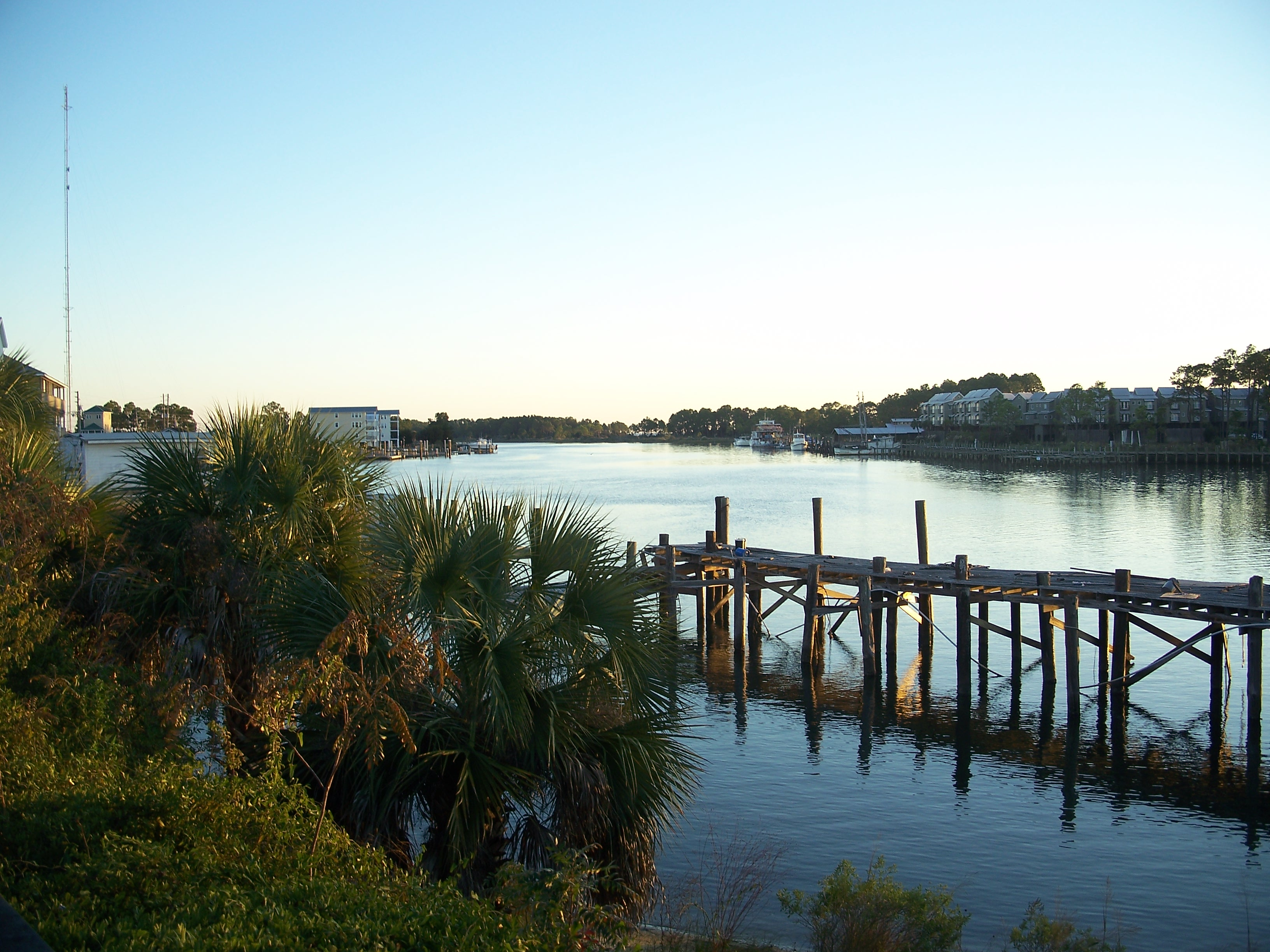
- Carrabelle, Florida
- Interactive map of Tate's Hell State Forest
- Location: Franklin and Liberty counties, Florida
- Nearest city: Carrabelle, Florida
- Coordinates: 29°55′13.52″N 84°49′29.11″W
- Area: 212,645 acres (86,054 ha)
- Created: 1994

Tate's Hell State Forest is 212,645 acres (860 km^{2}) of land in Franklin and Liberty counties in Florida. The forest is located near Carrabelle off US 98 along the Gulf coast and on St. James Island. At one time, Tate's Hell supported at least 12 major habitats including: wet flatwoods, wet prairie, seepage slope, baygall, floodplain forest, floodplain swamp, basin swamp, upland hardwood forest, sandhill, pine ridges, dense titi swamp thickets and scrub. Tate's Hell State Forest is an important hydrologic area and includes a section of the New River (Florida Panhandle). The forest's watershed provides fresh water into the Apalachicola Bay, the Carrabelle River and the Ochlockonee River.

During a 40-year period of private ownership prior to the state's acquisition in 1994, over 800 miles (1,300 km) of forest roads and ditches were constructed on the property to accommodate intensive commercial forest management operations. Most of the area was planted with pine monoculture and the drainage canals dried what had been previously wetlands. There was extensive loss of habitat and wildlife. Apalachicola Bay suffered from the loss of the previously continuous fresh water flow into the bay provided by the wetlands, adding to the effect of loss of water flow into the bay from the Apalachicola River. Causes include surface water use upstream of the Apalachicola River basin, such as supplying drinking water to the city of Atlanta, and agriculture use in Georgia. Debate over the use of water in this basin is the subject of a long-standing feud among the three southern states over which use or which user takes precedence over the others. A recent court ruling sets forth the history of water use in the upper reaches of the basin.

== Name ==
Local legend attributes the forest's unusual name to Cebe Tate, a local homesteader who became lost in the woods in the mid 1870s. He had ventured into the woods with his hunting dog in order to shoot a panther that had attacked his livestock. The legend is often recounted with Tate becoming separated from his dogs and lost for seven days and seven nights before coming to a clearing near Carrabelle, where he lived only long enough to say to a passerby, "My name is Cebe Tate, and I just came from Hell", before collapsing.

== Restoration ==
Since its acquisition by the State of Florida Department of Agriculture and Consumer Services in 1994, 12 restoration projects have been undertaken to restore some of the natural drainage and natural communities. These projects include removal or planting of some road beds, restoring natural water flow, and alteration of planted species. As of 2007, eight of the 12 projects had been completed at a cost of $1.446 million and affecting 39,070 acres (158.1 km^{2}) of the State Forest. It will however, take a much longer time for the forest to return to a more natural state. The Florida Department of Agriculture and Consumer Services and North West Florida Water Management District continue to study and plan for future restoration of the Forest.

== Animals and plant life ==
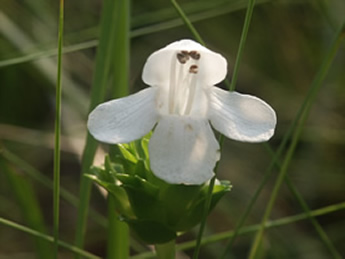
White Birds-in-a-nest (Macbridea alba)

Many endangered or threatened animals live in Tate's Hell State Forest, including the gopher tortoise and red-cockaded woodpecker. Some rare plant species living in the forest include thick-leaved water-willow (Justicia crassifolia), white birds-in-a-nest (Macbridea alba), Florida bear grass (Nolina atopocarpa), Chapman's butterwort (Pinguicula planifolia), and small-flowered meadow beauty (Rhexia parviflora). Common animals such as alligators and wild cats are found in the area as well.
