= Lanark Village, Florida =

- Unincorporated community
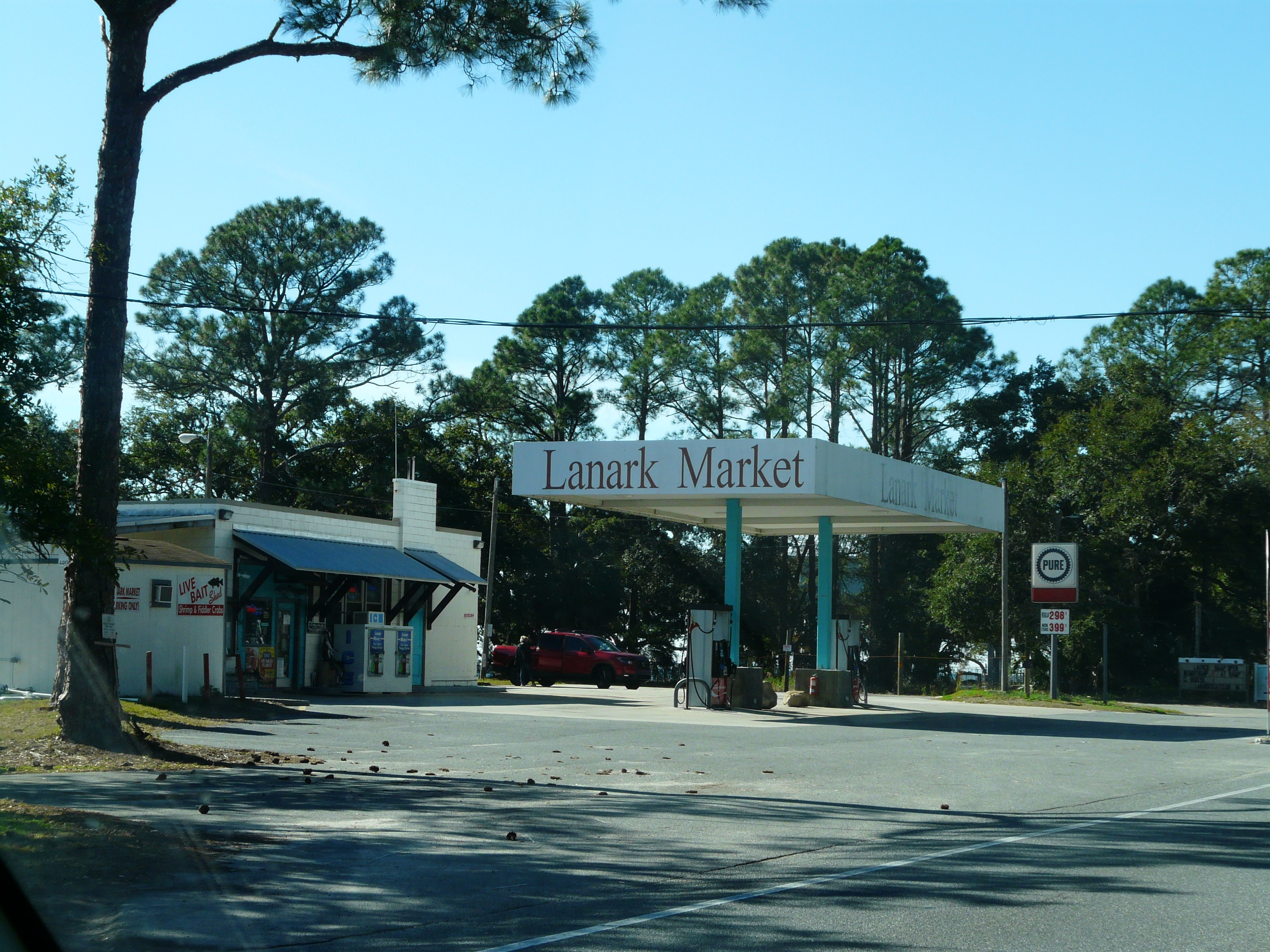
- Lanark Market

- Location within Florida
- Coordinates: 29°53′0″N 84°35′45″W
- Country: United States
- State: Florida
- County: Franklin
- Time zone: UTC-5 (Eastern (EST))
  - Summer (DST): UTC-4 (EDT)
- Area code: 850
- GNIS feature ID: 305927

Lanark Village is an unincorporated community in Franklin County, Florida, United States, located along U.S. 98, on the Gulf of Mexico. It is 5 miles (8.0 km) east of Carrabelle, Florida. In the late 19th and early 20th centuries, it was known as Lanark-on-the-Gulf.

== The Lanark Inn ==
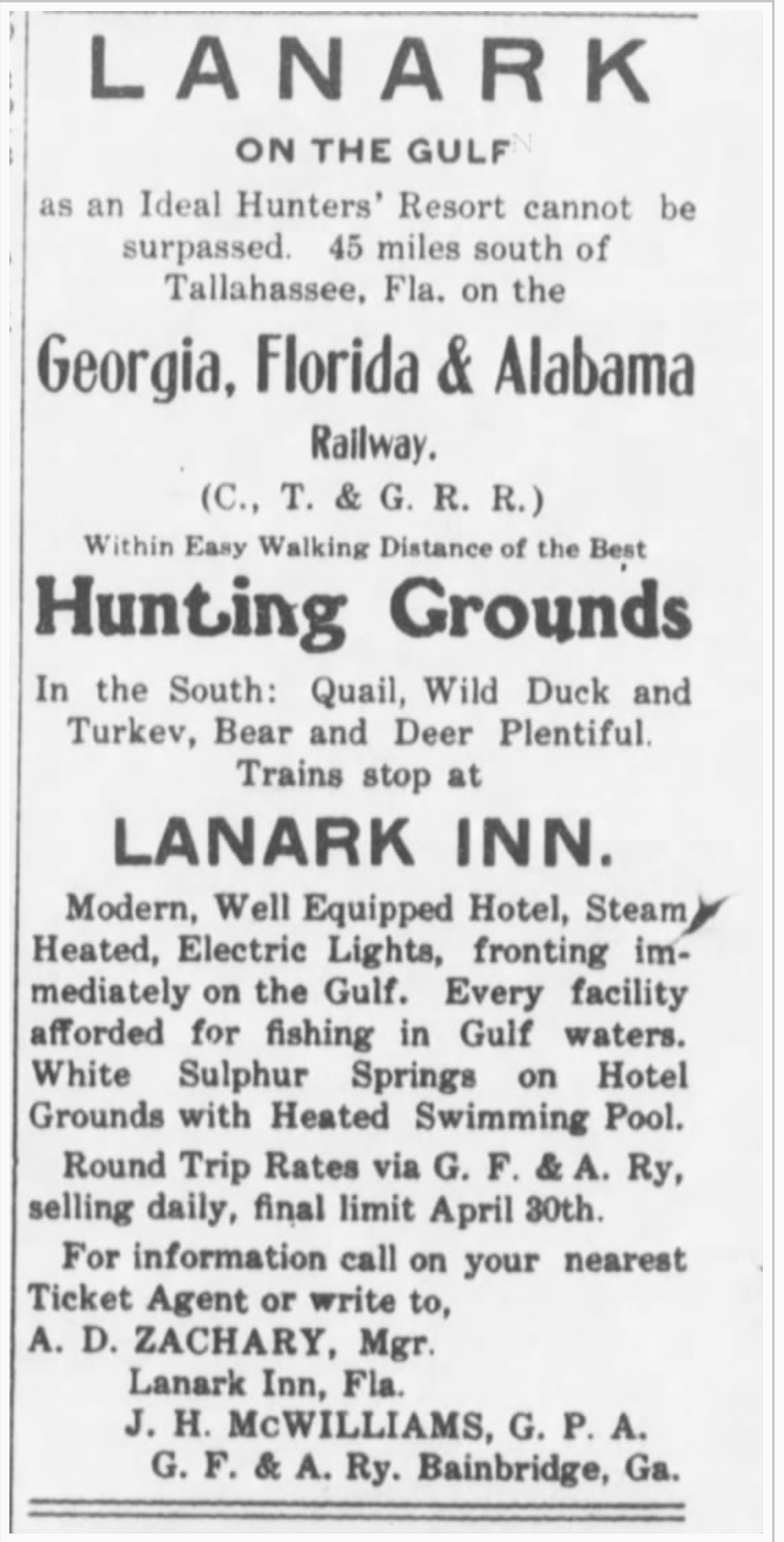
Advertisement for Lanark Inn, 1905

Lanark-on-the-Gulf was a resort with a large hotel, the Lanark Inn, patronized principally by people from Tallahassee. The hotel's brochure claimed that Lanark "is the most picturesque place in western Florida".

It was destroyed in the second hurricane of 1899, but was rebuilt. The rebuilt Lanark Inn was destroyed by fire in 1907, reopening after rebuilding in 1908. It had 100 rooms, and had live music almost every night at the dock, where there was a dancing pavilion.

The dock was connected to the hotel by a boardwalk. The Carrabelle, Tallahassee & Georgia Railroad ran excursion trains from Tallahassee.

== Camp Gordon Johnston ==
The Lanark Inn was torn down at the beginning of the United States' involvement in World War II, and was replaced in 1942 by Camp Gordon Johnston. This Army base trained amphibious soldiers and their support teams. A quarter of a million men were trained there. The trained soldiers were used in the D-Day attack.

The camp closed in June 1946.

== See also ==
- Lanark Reef
