= Carrabelle–Thompson Airport =

Airport in Florida, United States

Carrabelle–Thompson Airport (former Carrabelle Flight Strip)
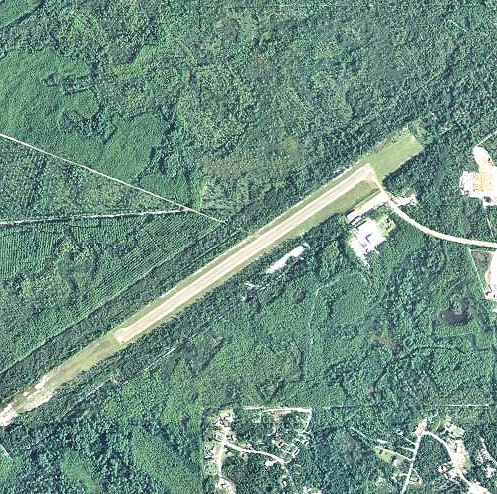
- USGS 2006 orthophoto
- IATA: none; ICAO: none; FAA LID: X13

Summary
- Airport type: Public
- Owner: Carrabelle Port and Airport Authority
- Serves: Carrabelle, Florida
- Elevation AMSL: 20 ft (6.1 m)
- Coordinates: 29°50′31″N 084°42′04″W

Map
- Location of airport in Florida X13 (the United States)

Runways
Direction	Length		Surface
Direction	ft	m	Surface
5/23	4,000	1,219	Asphalt

Statistics (2018)
- Aircraft operations (year ending 4/2/2018): 4,261
- Source: Federal Aviation Administration

Carrabelle–Thompson Airport (FAA LID: X13) is a public use airport located three nautical miles (6 km) west of the central business district of Carrabelle, a city in Franklin County, Florida, United States. It is owned by the Carrabelle Port and Airport Authority.

== History ==
During World War II, the facility was built in 1943 by the United States Army Air Forces as a Third Air Force auxiliary landing field known as Carrabelle Flight Strip. During the war, it served as an auxiliary airfield, controlled by Dale Mabry Army Airfield near Tallahassee. No permanent units were assigned to the airfield.

Turned over to civil use after the war, it is now a public airport providing general aviation service.

== Facilities and aircraft ==
Carrabelle–Thompson Airport covers an area of 202 acres (82 ha) at an elevation of 20 feet (6 m) above mean sea level. It has one runway designated 5/23 with an asphalt surface measuring 4,000 by 75 feet (1,219 x 23 m).

For the 12-month period ending April 2, 2018, the airport had 4,261 aircraft operations, an average of 82 per week: 99% general aviation and <1% military.

The airport has a fixed-base operator.

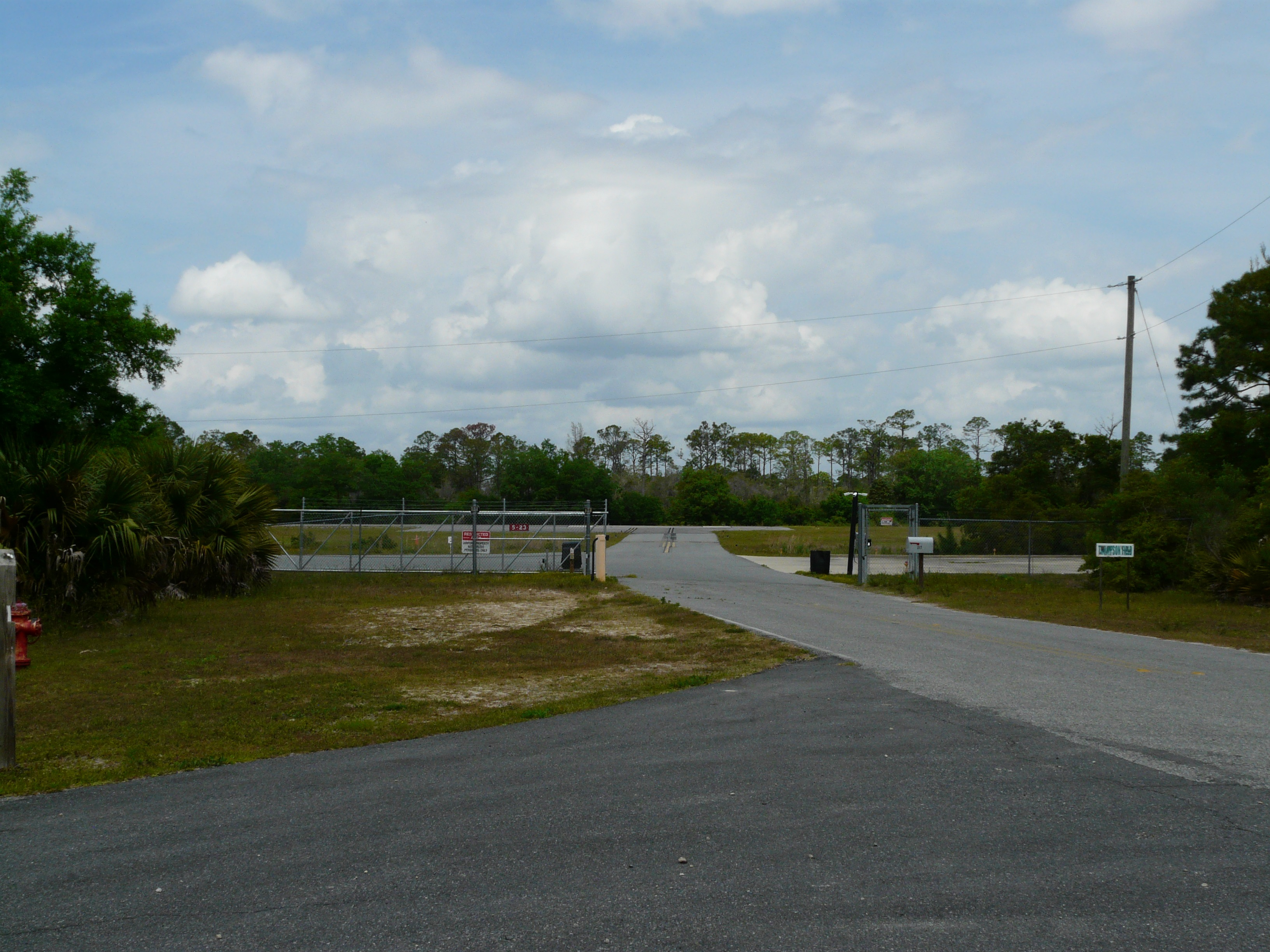
Carrabelle–Thompson Airport entrance

== Accidents and incidents ==
- On February 5, 2018, an experimental Sonex Trainer aircraft experienced a loss of engine power after takeoff and subsequently crashed.

== See also ==
- Florida World War II Army Airfields
- List of airports in Florida
