= Carrabelle River =

River in Florida, United States

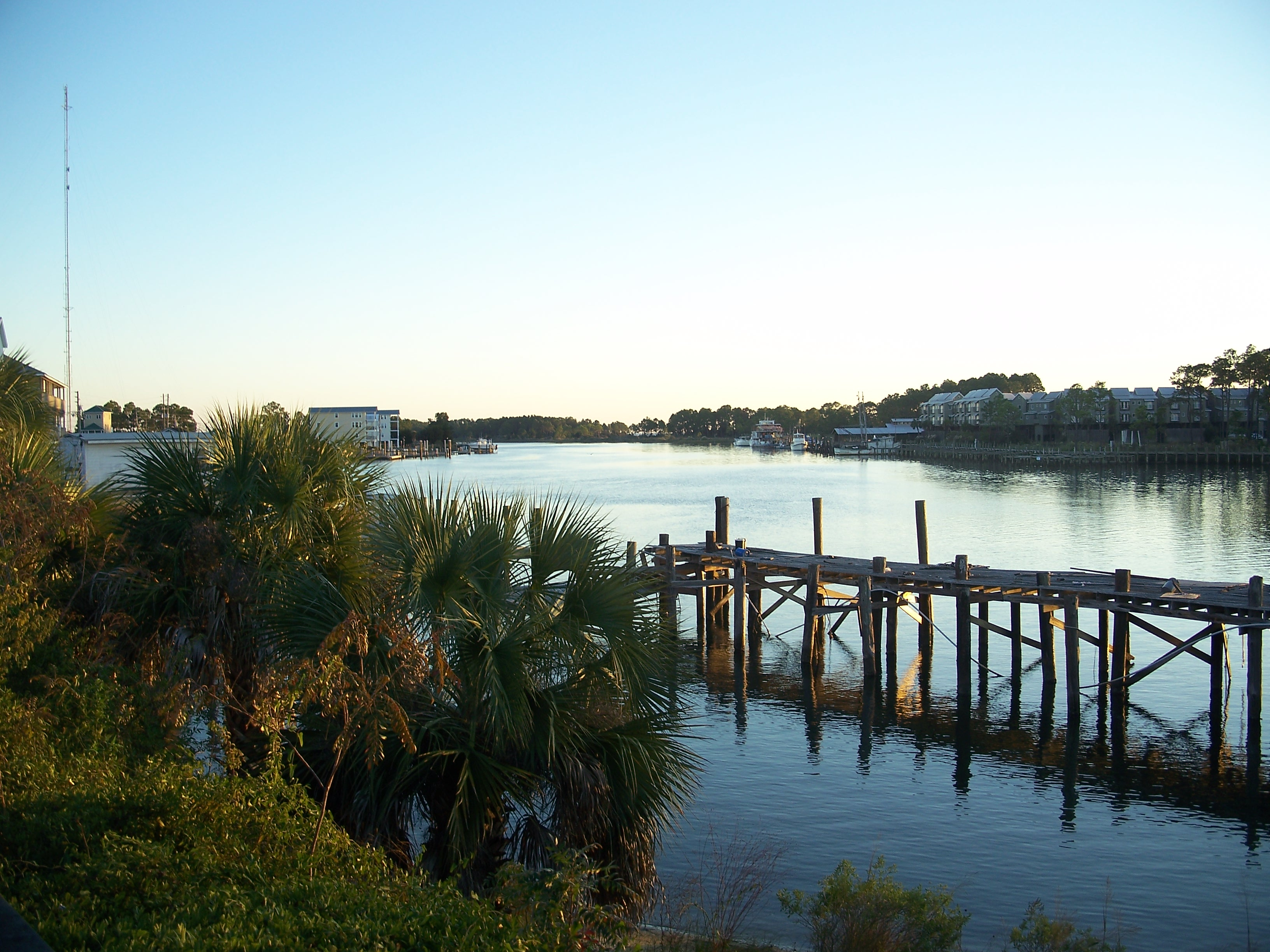
- Carrabelle River in city of Carrabelle, Florida

- Location within Florida

Location
- Country: United States

Physical characteristics
- Mouth
  - location: 29°50′20″N 84°39′43″W

Carrabelle River is located in Carrabelle, Florida, and flows into St. George Sound in Apalachicola Bay and the Gulf of Mexico. The area has been a base for commercial fishermen. It is home to a river festival. It is crossed by the Carrabelle River Bridge on U.S. Route 98. Upstream, the Carrabelle forks into the New River and Crooked River.
