= National Register of Historic Places listings in Franklin County, Florida =

Location of Franklin County in Florida

This is a list of the National Register of Historic Places listings in Franklin County, Florida.

This is intended to be a complete list of the properties and districts on the National Register of Historic Places in Franklin County, Florida, United States. The locations of National Register properties and districts for which the latitude and longitude coordinates are included below, may be seen in a map.

There are 11 properties and districts listed on the National Register in the county, including 1 National Historic Landmark.

This National Park Service list is complete through NPS recent listings posted July 31, 2026.

Contents: Counties in Florida (non-linked contain no National Register listings)
Alachua - Baker - Bay - Bradford - Brevard - Broward - Calhoun - Charlotte - Citrus - Clay - Collier - Columbia - DeSoto - Dixie - Duval - Escambia - Flagler - Franklin - Gadsden - Gilchrist - Glades - Gulf - Hamilton - Hardee - Hendry - Hernando - Highlands - Hillsborough (Tampa) - Holmes - Indian River - Jackson - Jefferson - Lafayette - Lake - Lee - Leon - Levy - Liberty - Madison - Manatee - Marion - Martin - Miami-Dade (Miami) - Monroe - Nassau - Okaloosa - Okeechobee - Orange - Osceola - Palm Beach - Pasco - Pinellas - Polk - Putnam - St. Johns - St. Lucie - Santa Rosa - Sarasota - Seminole - Sumter - Suwannee - Taylor - Union - Volusia - Wakulla - Walton - Washington

== Current listings ==
	Name on the Register	Image	Date listed	Location	City or town	Description
1	Apalachicola Historic District	Apalachicola Historic District	November 21, 1980 (#80000951)	Roughly bounded by the Apalachicola River, Apalachicola Bay, and 17th and Jefferson Streets; 29°43′42″N 84°59′31″W	Apalachicola	
2	Cape St. George Light	Cape St. George Light	September 10, 1974 (#74000625)	St. George Island; 29°39′46″N 84°51′48″W	St. George Island	
3	Crooked River Lighthouse	Crooked River Lighthouse	December 1, 1978 (#78000941)	Southwest of Carrabelle off U.S. Route 319; 29°49′37″N 84°42′02″W	Carrabelle	
4	Downtown Carrabelle Historic District	Downtown Carrabelle Historic District	July 11, 2024 (#100009459)	Roughly between Carrabelle R., Ave C SE, SE 3rd St., and E Meridian St. 29°51′02″N 84°39′49″W	Carrabelle	
5	Fort Gadsden Historic Memorial	Fort Gadsden Historic Memorial	February 23, 1972 (#72000318)	6 miles southwest of Sumatra; 29°56′29″N 85°00′45″W	Sumatra	
6	Pierce Site		January 11, 1974 (#74000624)	Address Restricted	Apalachicola	
7	Porter's Bar Site		January 23, 1975 (#75000553)	Address Restricted	Eastpoint	
8	David G. Raney House	David G. Raney House	September 22, 1972 (#72000316)	Southwestern corner of Market Street and Avenue F 29°43′42″N 84°59′08″W	Apalachicola	
9	St. Paul A.M.E. Church	St. Paul A.M.E. Church	June 20, 2025 (#SG100011954)	81, 83, and 85 Avenue I 29°43′43″N 84°59′27″W	Apalachicola	
10	Trinity Episcopal Church	Trinity Episcopal Church	June 30, 1972 (#72000317)	Avenue D and 6th Street (Gorrie Square); 29°43′30″N 84°59′07″W	Apalachicola	
11	Yent Mound		May 24, 1973 (#73000577)	Address Restricted	St. Teresa	

== See also ==
- List of National Historic Landmarks in Florida
- National Register of Historic Places listings in Florida
