= 1873 Atlantic hurricane season =

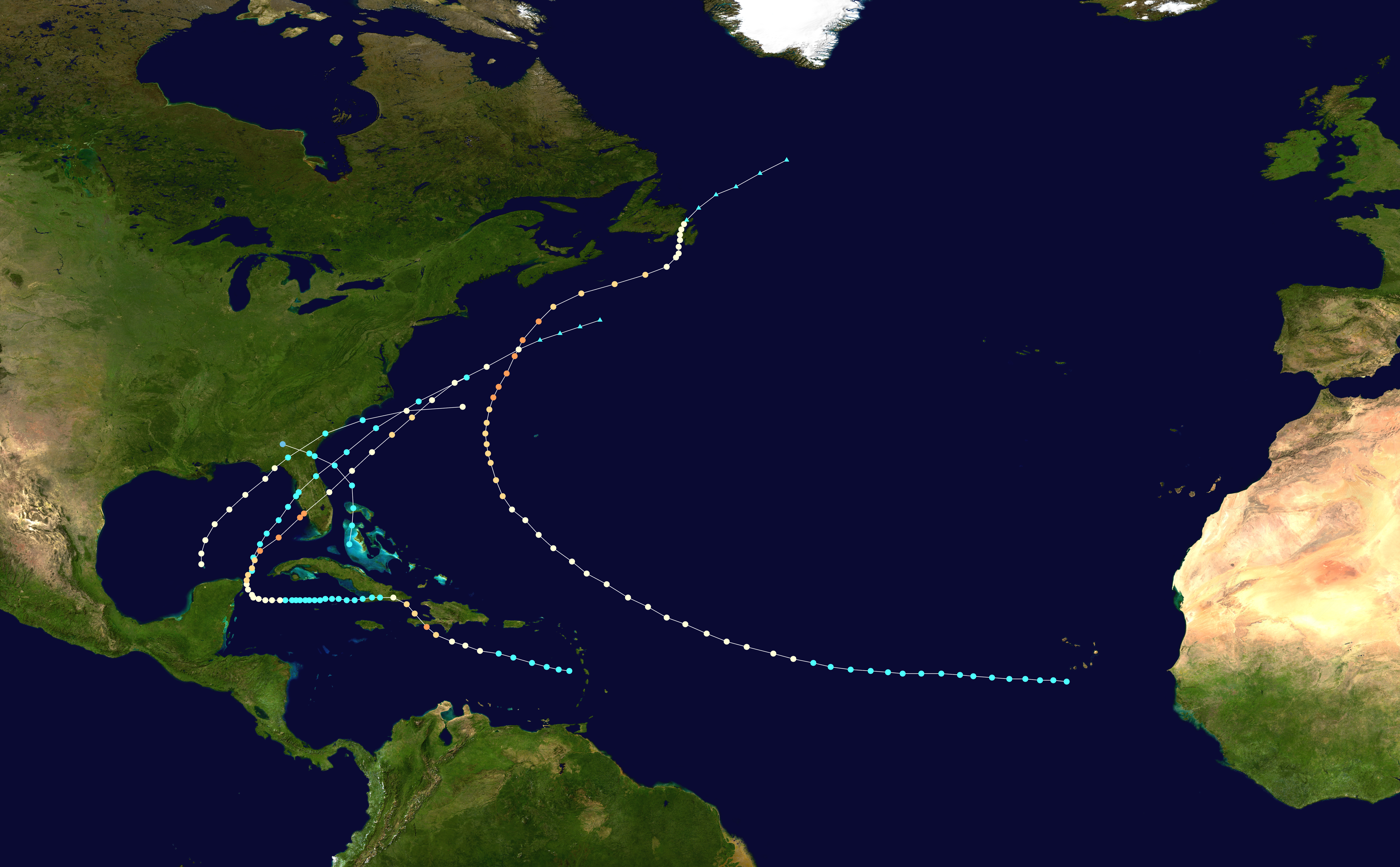
- Season summary map

Seasonal boundaries
- First system formed: June 1, 1873
- Last system dissipated: October 9, 1873

Strongest storm
- Name: Five
  - Maximum winds: 115 mph (185 km/h) (1-minute sustained)
  - Lowest pressure: 959 mbar (hPa; 28.32 inHg)

Seasonal statistics
- Total storms: 5
- Hurricanes: 3
- Major hurricanes (Cat. 3+): 2
- Total fatalities: 252-630
- Total damage: $4.055 million (1873 USD)

The 1873 Atlantic hurricane season was quiet, featuring only five known tropical cyclones, but all of them made landfall, causing significant impacts in some areas of the basin. Of these five systems, three intensified into a hurricane, while two of those attained major hurricane status. (Note: A major hurricane is a storm that ranks as Category 3 or higher on the Saffir–Simpson hurricane wind scale.) However, in the absence of modern satellite and other remote-sensing technologies, only storms that affected populated land areas or encountered ships at sea were recorded, so the actual total could be higher. An undercount bias of zero to six tropical cyclones per year between 1851 and 1885 and zero to four per year between 1886 and 1910 has been estimated.

Of the known cyclones, large changes were made to the tracks of second and fifth systems in 1995 by José Fernández-Partagás and Henry Díaz, who also proposed smaller changes to the known track of the third system. Neither Fernández-Partagás and Díaz nor the Atlantic hurricane reanalysis project introduced any previously undocumented tropical cyclones during their reanalyses of the 1873 season. Another reanalysis study, authored by climate researcher Michael Chenoweth and published in 2014, theorizes that six cyclones formed. Chenoweth proposes the removal of the first and fourth storms from the official hurricane database (HURDAT), as well as the addition of three new storms. However, these changes have yet to be incorporated into HURDAT.

The season's first known cyclone was initially observed near the Bahamian island Andros on June 1. After crossing Grand Bahama, it moved northwestward and hit Georgia on the next day, leaving minimal damage. More than two months passed before the track for the next storm began on August 13. After nearly two weeks at sea, the hurricane extensively impacted Atlantic Canada, with at least 223 fatalities in the region and about $3.5 million (1873 US$) in damage. (Note: All damage figures are in 1873 US$, unless otherwise noted) Three more storms developed in September, the first of which struck near St. Marks, Florida, on September 19, causing more than $550,000 in damage and at least three deaths, mostly over the eastern Florida panhandle. The season's final known storm was detected over the eastern Caribbean on September 26 and transitioned into an extratropical cyclone on October 9. The cyclone struck Haiti, Cuba, and Florida at hurricane intensity, killing at least 26 people and leaving a substantial but unknown amount of damage. Overall, the storms of the 1873 season caused at least 252 deaths and more than $4.055 million in damage.

== Season summary ==
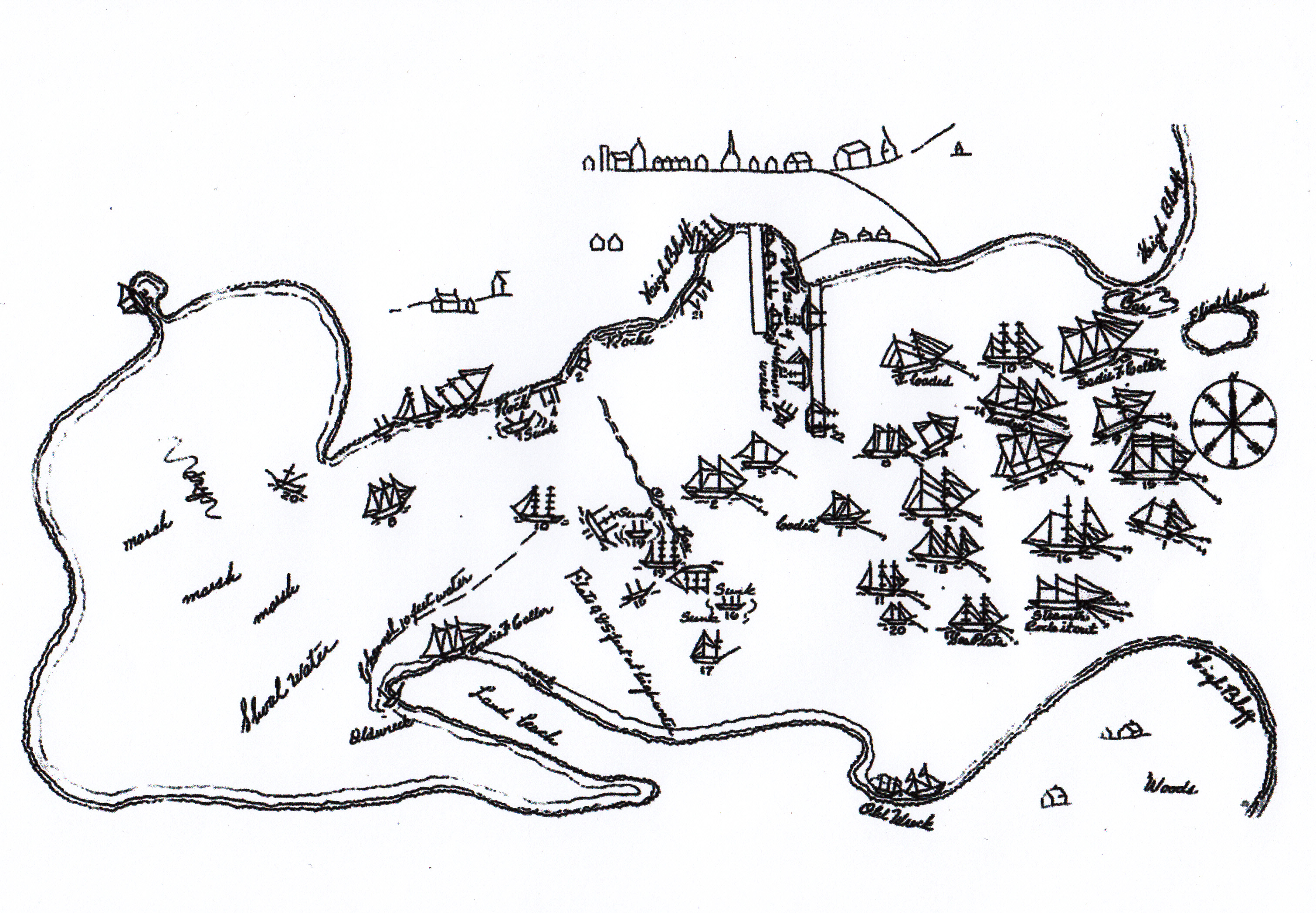
Map of shipwrecks in Cow Bay, Nova Scotia, due to the second storm

The Atlantic hurricane database (HURDAT) recognizes five tropical cyclones for the 1873 season. Three storms attained hurricane status, maximum sustained winds of 75 mph (119 km/h) or greater. Of those three, two intensified into major hurricanes, becoming Category 3 cyclones with winds of 115 mph (185 km/h). No previously undocumented cyclones were added by meteorologists José Fernández-Partagás and Henry Díaz in 1995 or by the Atlantic hurricane reanalysis project. However, in 2014 study, climate researcher Michael Chenoweth proposed the addition of three cyclones and the removal of the first and fourth systems, but these changes have yet to be incorporated into HURDAT.

On June 1, the season's first known storm formed in the Bahamas near Andros island and made landfall just north of the Florida-Georgia state line on the next day, shortly before dissipating. More than two months elapsed until the next system developed, with that storm's track beginning near the Cabo Verde Islands on August 13. The cyclone moved in a parabolical path across the Atlantic for two weeks until making landfall in Newfoundland on August 25, prior to becoming extratropical on August 27. September became the most active month of the season, featuring three storms. The third and final peaked as a Category 3 hurricane with winds of 115 mph (185 km/h) and a minimum atmospheric pressure of 959 mbar (28.3 inHg), making it the strongest cyclone during the 1873 season. It transitioned into an extratropical cyclone on October 9.

All five of the known tropical systems during the season made landfall, three at hurricane intensity. The second storm caused significant impact in Atlantic Canada in late August. At least 223 deaths occurred, while estimates on the number of fatalities range as high as 600. Regardless, the system remains the second deadliest cyclone in Canada, behind only the 1775 Newfoundland hurricane. Damage totaled approximately $3.5 million. In September, the third storm caused more than $550,000 in damage and at least three deaths, mostly in the eastern Florida panhandle. Between late September and early October, the season's final system made three landfalls at hurricane intensity, particularly rendering severe impacts in Haiti's Jacmel area and Cuba's Guantánamo Bay area. Additionally, at least 26 fatalities occurred, 24 due to a schooner capsizing near Isla de la Juventud. The storms of the 1873 season collectively caused 252-630 deaths and over $4.055 million in damage.

The season's activity was reflected with an accumulated cyclone energy (ACE) rating of 73, only slightly higher than the previous season despite no major hurricanes in 1872. ACE is a metric used to express the energy used by a tropical cyclone during its lifetime. Therefore, a storm with a longer duration will have higher values of ACE. It is only calculated at six-hour increments in which specific tropical and subtropical systems are either at or above sustained wind speeds of 39 mph (63 km/h), which is the threshold for tropical storm intensity. Thus, tropical depressions are not included here.

== Systems ==
=== Tropical Storm One ===
- Tropical storm (SSHWS)
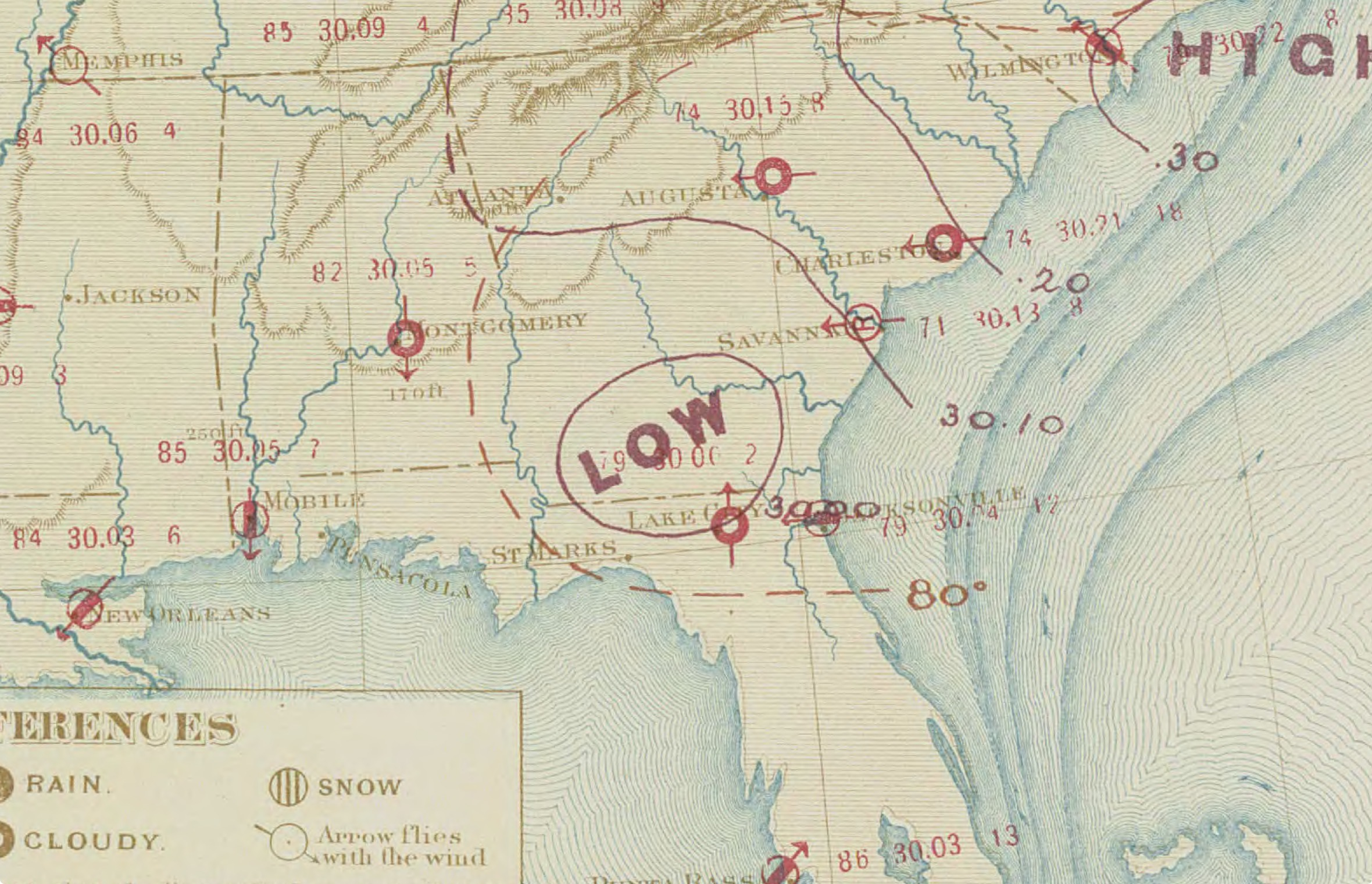
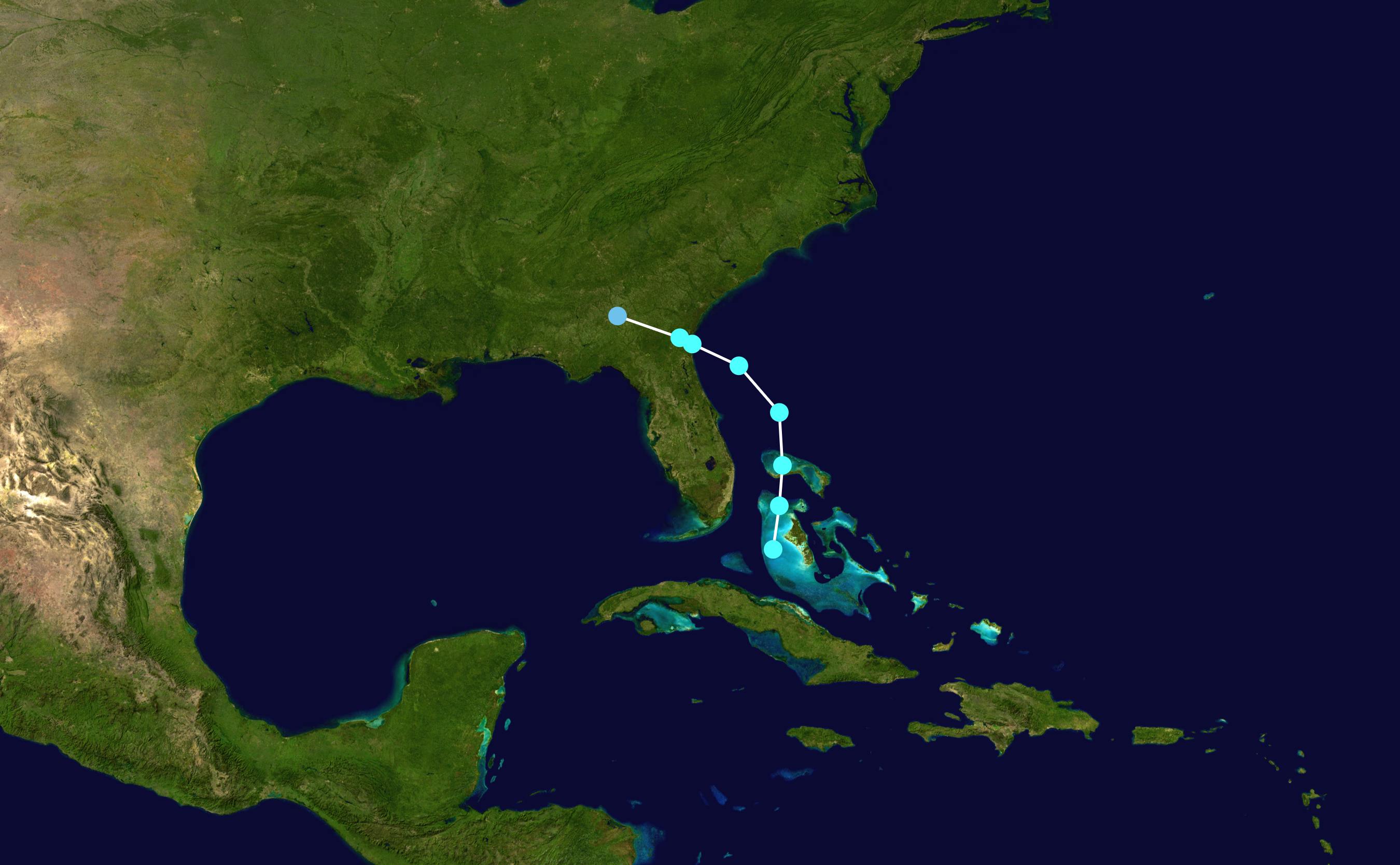
- Duration: June 1 – June 2
- Peak intensity: 45 mph (75 km/h) (1-min);

The first storm of the season developed on June 1 over the western Bahamas. It moved northward before turning northwestward and striking just north of the Florida–Georgia state line on June 2. The storm quickly dissipated. It produced 28 mph (45 km/h) wind gusts in Jacksonville, Florida. Climate researcher Michael Chenoweth proposed in a reanalysis study, published in 2014, that this storm did not exist.

=== Hurricane Two ===
- Category 3 hurricane (SSHWS)
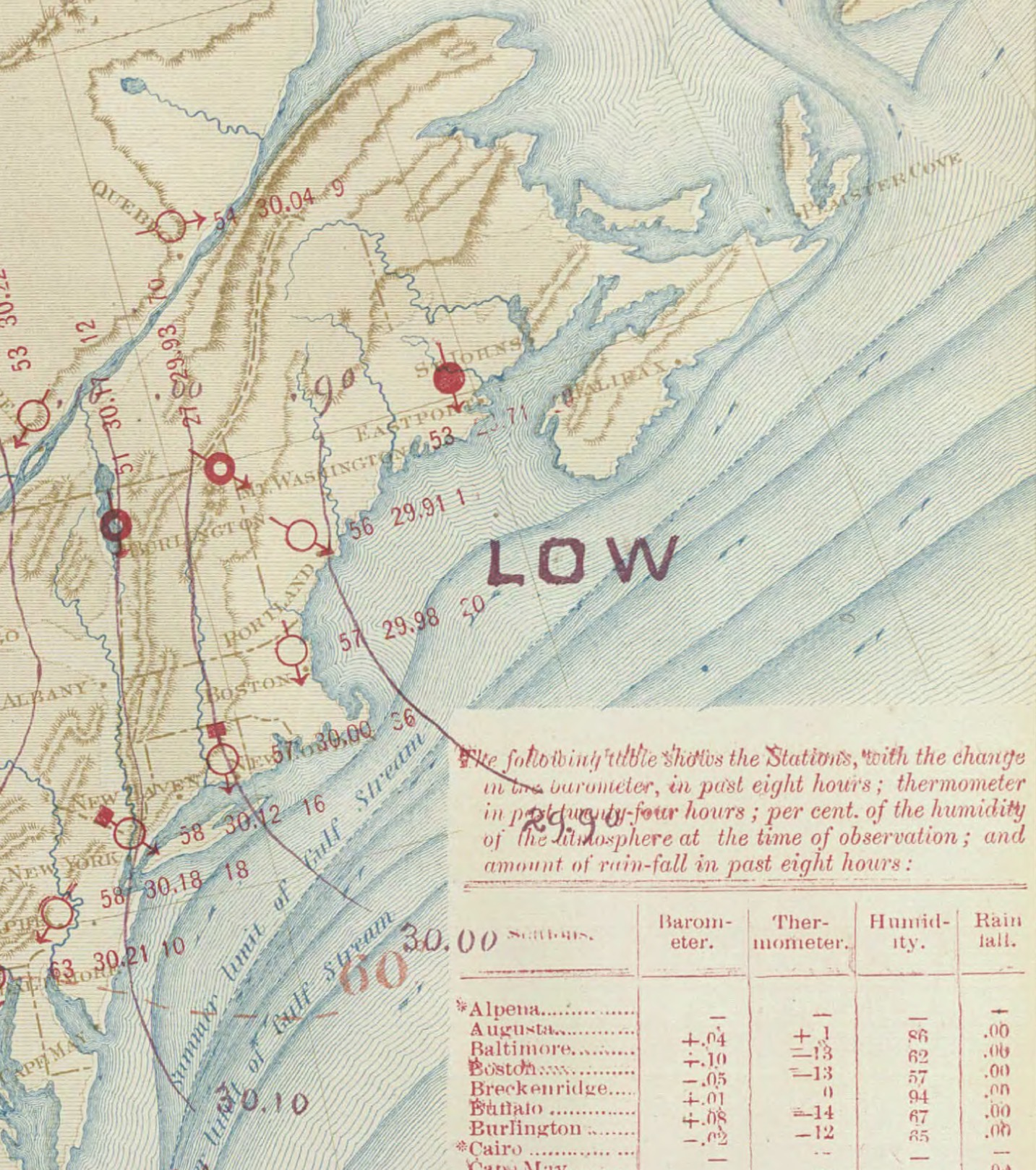
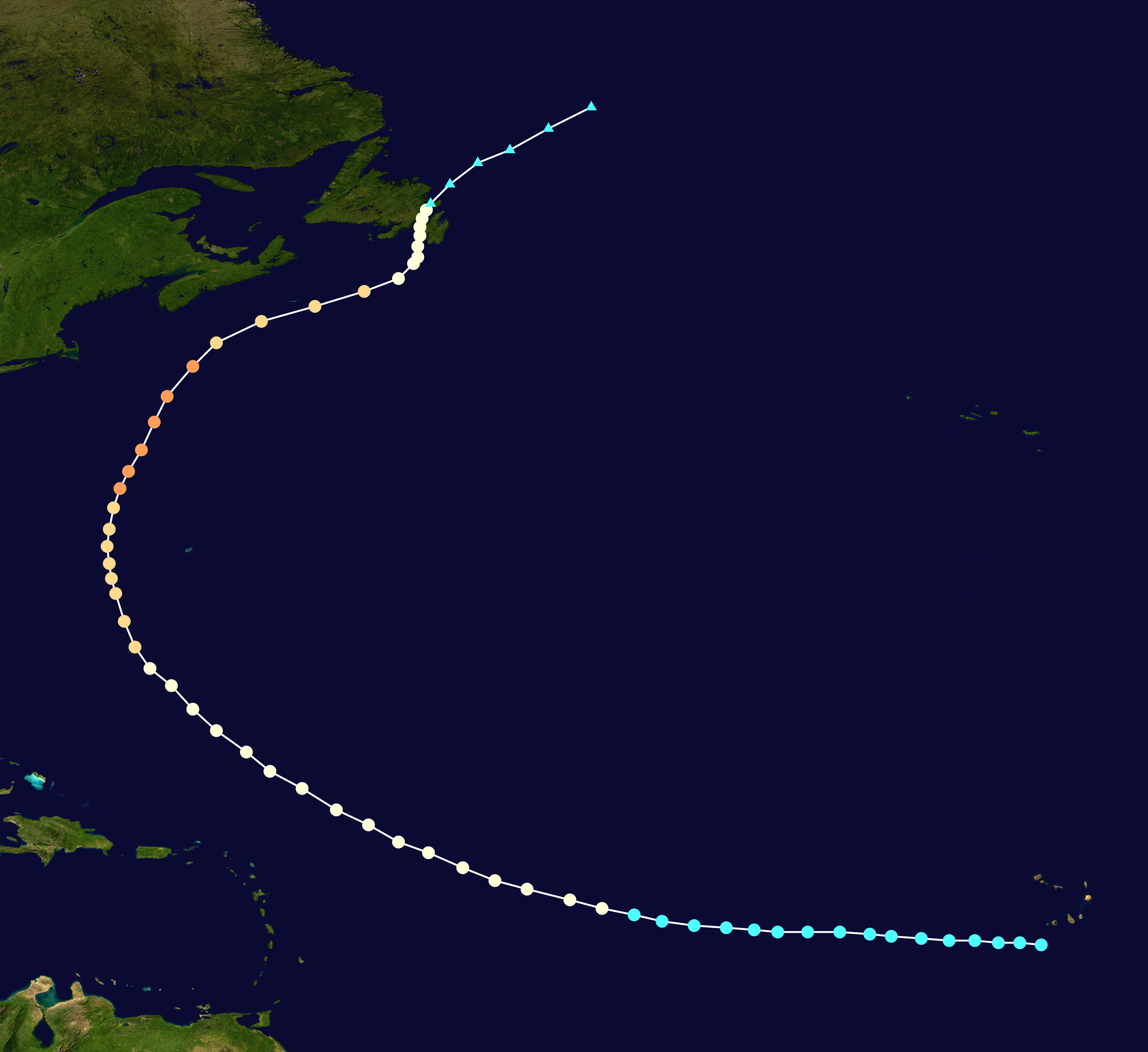
- Duration: August 13 – August 27
- Peak intensity: 115 mph (185 km/h) (1-min); 962 mbar (hPa)

The official track for this storm begins just south of the Cape Verde islands on August 13, the same day it was encountered by the bark Crest of the Wave. Following the track of a Cape Verde hurricane, the cyclone became a hurricane on August 17. It recurved north-northwestward on August 21 and then north-northeastward by the next day. On August 23, the storm peaked with winds of 115 mph (185 km/h), equivalent to a minimal Category 3 hurricane on the Saffir–Simpson scale. As it passed to the south of Nova Scotia, the storm turned northeastward, moving near Sable Island early on August 25. The Atlantic hurricane reanalysis project estimated in 2011 that the cyclone attained a barometric pressure of 962 mbar (28.4 inHg) around this time, although the storm had likely weakened to a Category 2 hurricane. By late on August 25, the system turned northward and decelerated, striking the Cape Shore region of Newfoundland's Avalon Peninsula on the following day. Thereafter, the storm became extratropical on August 27 over eastern Newfoundland or just offshore. The extratropical remnants moved northeastward and dissipated over the Labrador Sea late on August 28.

Although a bulletin issued by the Signal Service on August 23, 1873, is sometimes considered the first warning issued in relation to a hurricane, this has been contested. Meteorologists José Fernández-Partagás and Henry F. Díaz noted that the bulletin does not explicitly discuss a hurricane and argued that the agency likely issued the warning for high winds due to a weather pattern unrelated to the hurricane. Also known as "The Lord's Day Gale" and "The Great Nova Scotia Hurricane of 1873," the storm generated gales at Sydney, Truro, and Halifax, and produced at least 2.0 in (50 mm) of rain at each of those locations. Overall, the hurricane destroyed about 1,200 boats and 900 buildings in Nova Scotia. Guysborough County and Cape Breton Island in particular suffered extensive impacts, with a number of damaged or destroyed homes, businesses, and churches. Victoria County also reported massive crop losses. At least 223 people died, mostly sailors who were lost at sea. This number is disputed, as the Monthly Weather Review recorded 223 fatalities but The New York Times published a death toll of 600. Of those, approximately 100 occurred in Newfoundland, while about 40 people died after two American vessels sank near Prince Edward Island. The hurricane caused roughly $3.5 million in damage.

According to Chenoweth's study, published in 2014, this storm developed three days earlier and farther south than HURDAT suggests. The system follows a similar, yet less parabolical path and transitions into an extratropical cyclone several hours before reaching Newfoundland.

=== Hurricane Three ===
- Category 1 hurricane (SSHWS)
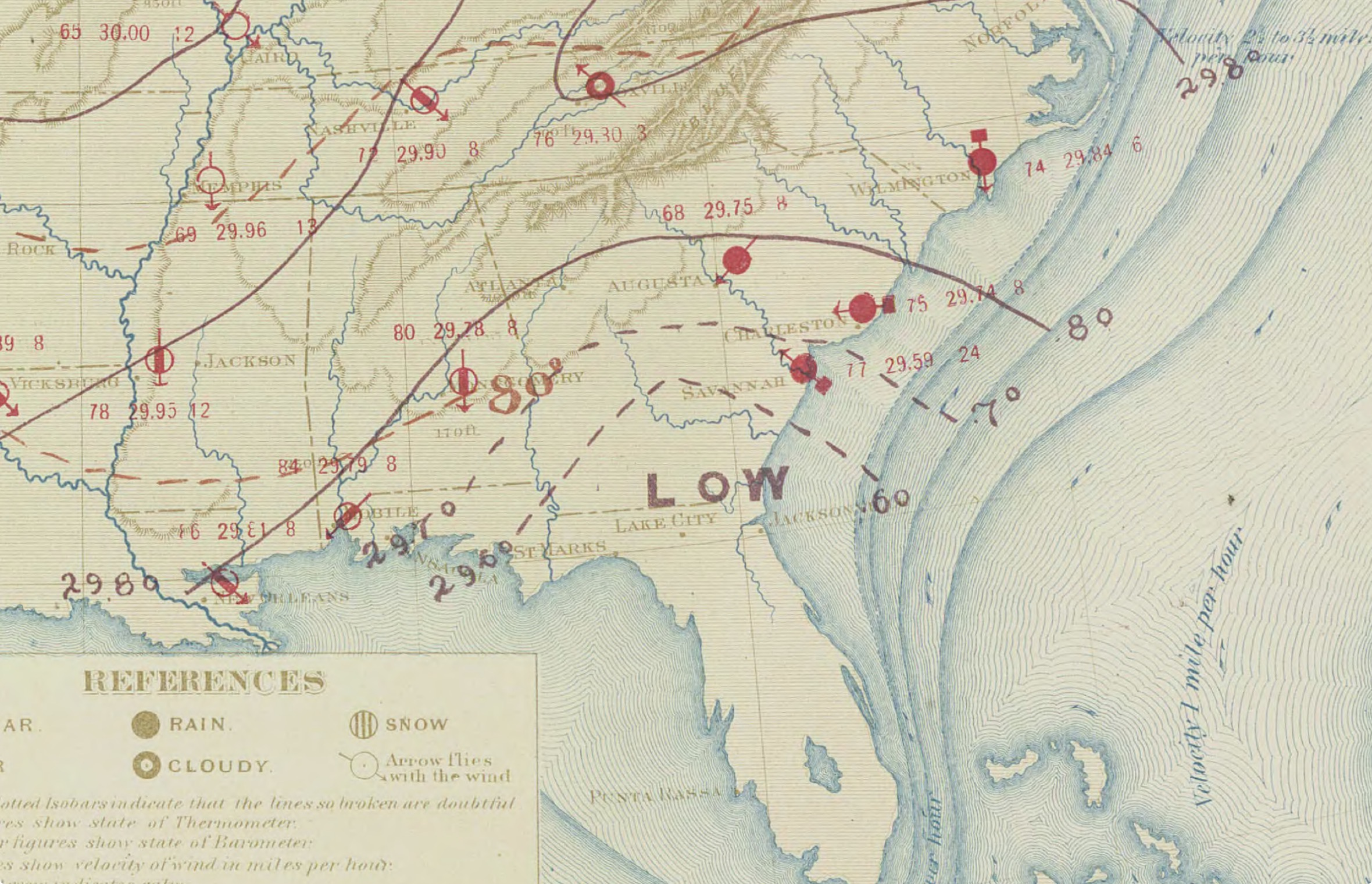
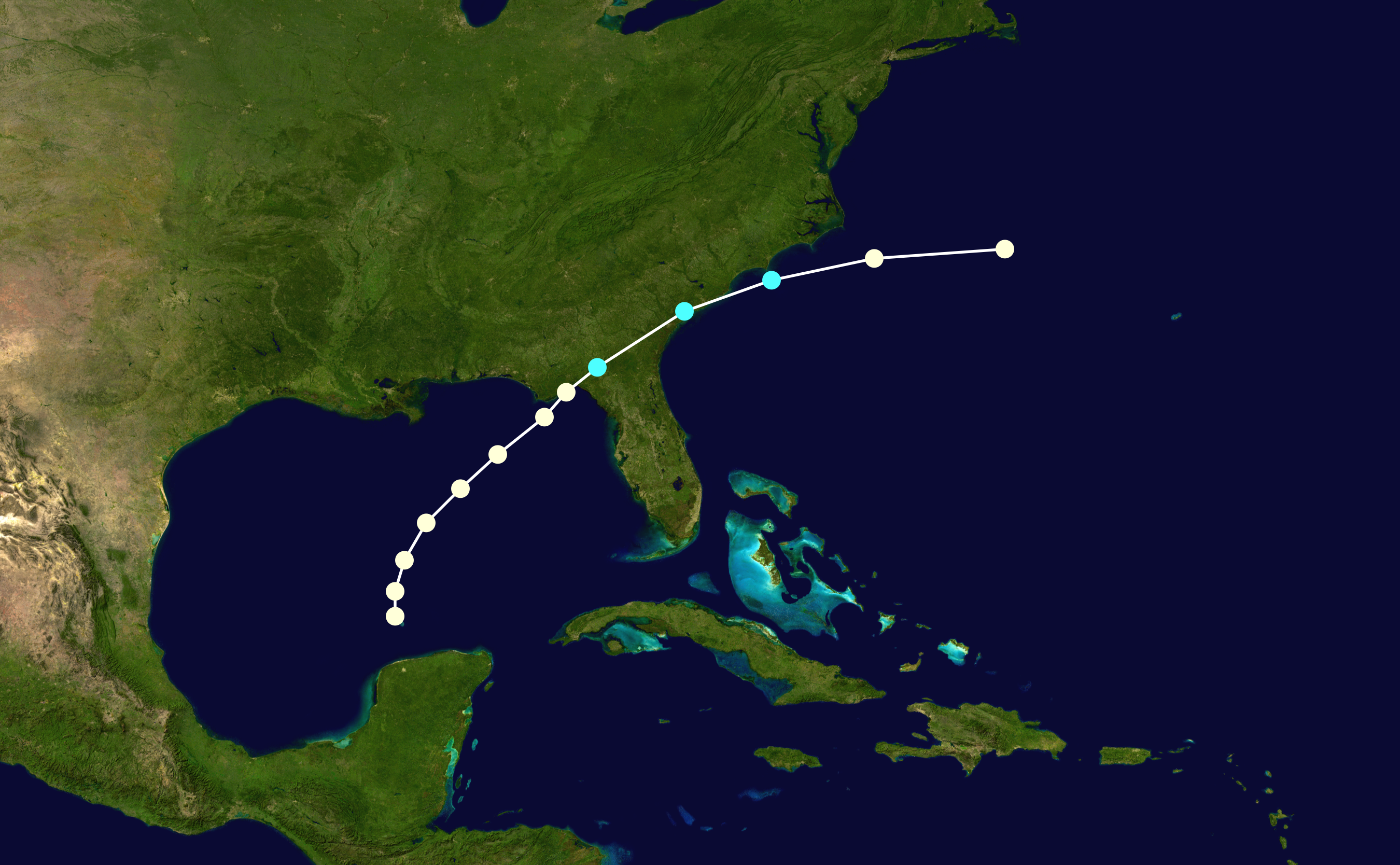
- Duration: September 18 – September 20
- Peak intensity: 80 mph (130 km/h) (1-min); ~982 mbar (hPa)

A hurricane was first observed in the south-central Gulf of Mexico on September 18. It moved quickly northeastward, striking St. Marks, Florida, around 15:00 UTC on September 19. The Atlantic hurricane reanalysis project estimated in 2011 that the storm had a barometric pressure of 982 mbar (29.0 inHg) upon landfall, along with sustained winds of 80 mph (130 km/h). Moving inland, the eye of the storm crossed Tallahassee, attended by an hour-long calm. Sustained winds in town were unofficially estimated at up to 100 mph (160 km/h). Later on September 19, the system weakened to a tropical storm as it entered Georgia. The storm then crossed into South Carolina early the next day and soon emerged into the Atlantic. Based on ship reports, the cyclone likely re-intensified into a hurricane on September 20 but was last noted on that day about 300 mi (485 km) east of North Carolina. Chenoweth extends its path back to September 12 over the southeastern Caribbean Sea and adds one additional day at the end of its duration, with the system accelerating northeastward towards the Grand Banks of Newfoundland.

The storm was considered the most severe to affect interior North Florida between the close of the American Civil War and the early 1900s. In Florida, only two homes remained standing at St. Marks, leaving twenty families homeless. The storm demolished about 20 residences in Apalachicola and unroofed approximately twice as many, while also damaging about half of businesses and many vessels in the town. Damage in Apalachicola reached about $250,000, and cypress trees nearby were shorn of their bark, as if "shaved by a knife". Many "substantial" buildings in town were leveled, including 15 brick stores. All the local orange trees were toppled. The Dog Island Light was blown apart. An 18-foot-high (5.5 m) storm tide inundated St. Marks, and farther south, the hurricane destroyed 12 dwellings on Cedar Key. At St. Teresa the storm felled large trees and destroyed boats. Strong winds in Tallahassee unroofed stores and demolished numerous gin houses. Additionally, the storm destroyed 30–40 homes and substantially damaged many others. Among the many other structures suffering damage in Tallahassee was the Florida State Capitol, with floodwaters noted in several sections of the building. Trees littered the Capitol grounds. Chimneys and porches were ripped off homes. Leon County alone recorded $100,000 to $200,000 in damage. The New York Times reported three or four deaths occurring in the area. Damage in neighboring Jefferson County was estimated at $200,000. The eastern Florida panhandle suffered a loss of about one-third of its cotton crops, and wind gusts were estimated to have reached 150 mph (240 km/h). Many tornadoes were suspected, their paths marked by sheared-off trees. In Georgia, heavy rains fell as far north as Macon; these caused agricultural damage across southern Georgia and washed out railroad tracks, leading to some fatal train accidents.

=== Tropical Storm Four ===
- Tropical storm (SSHWS)
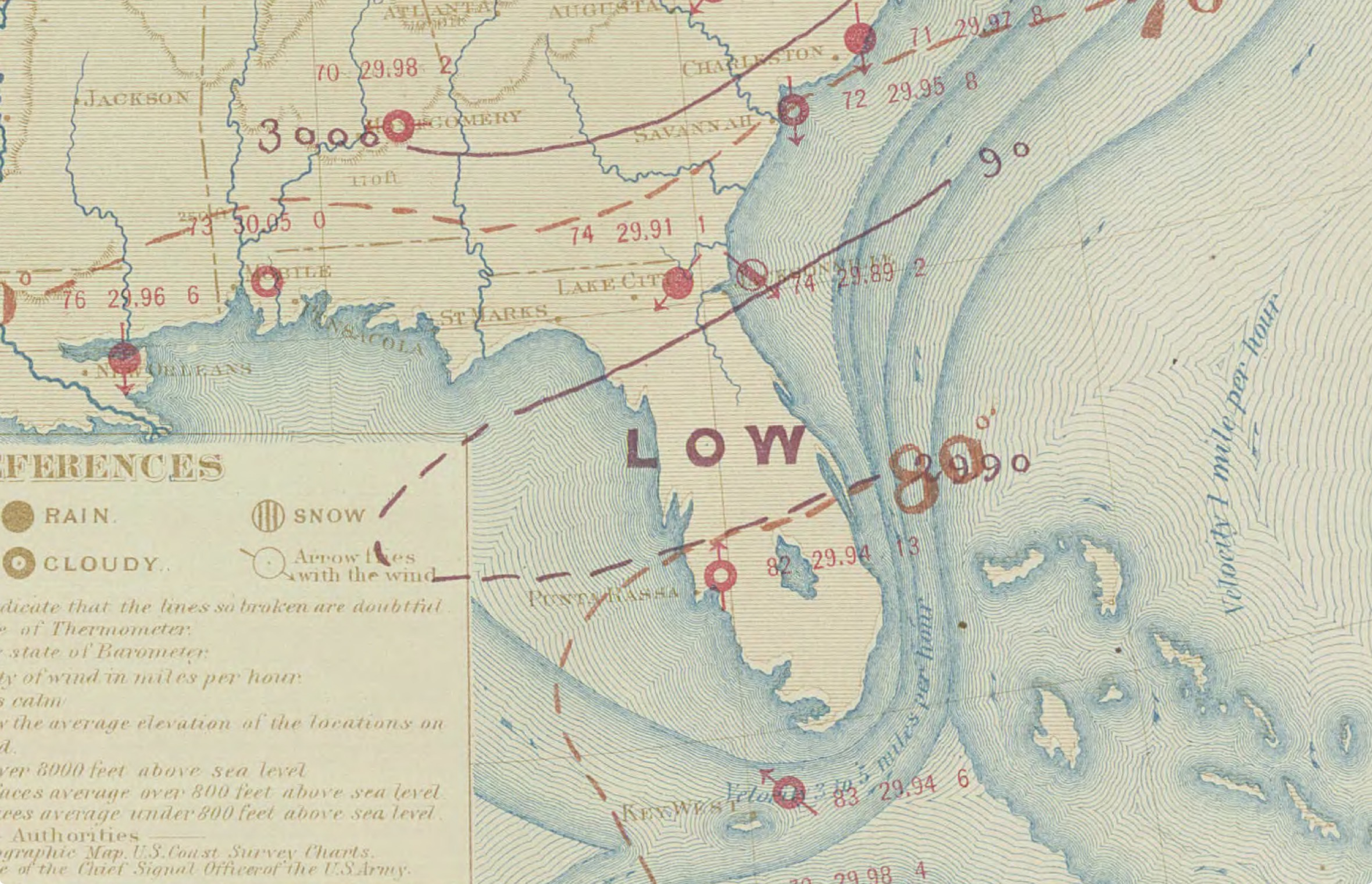
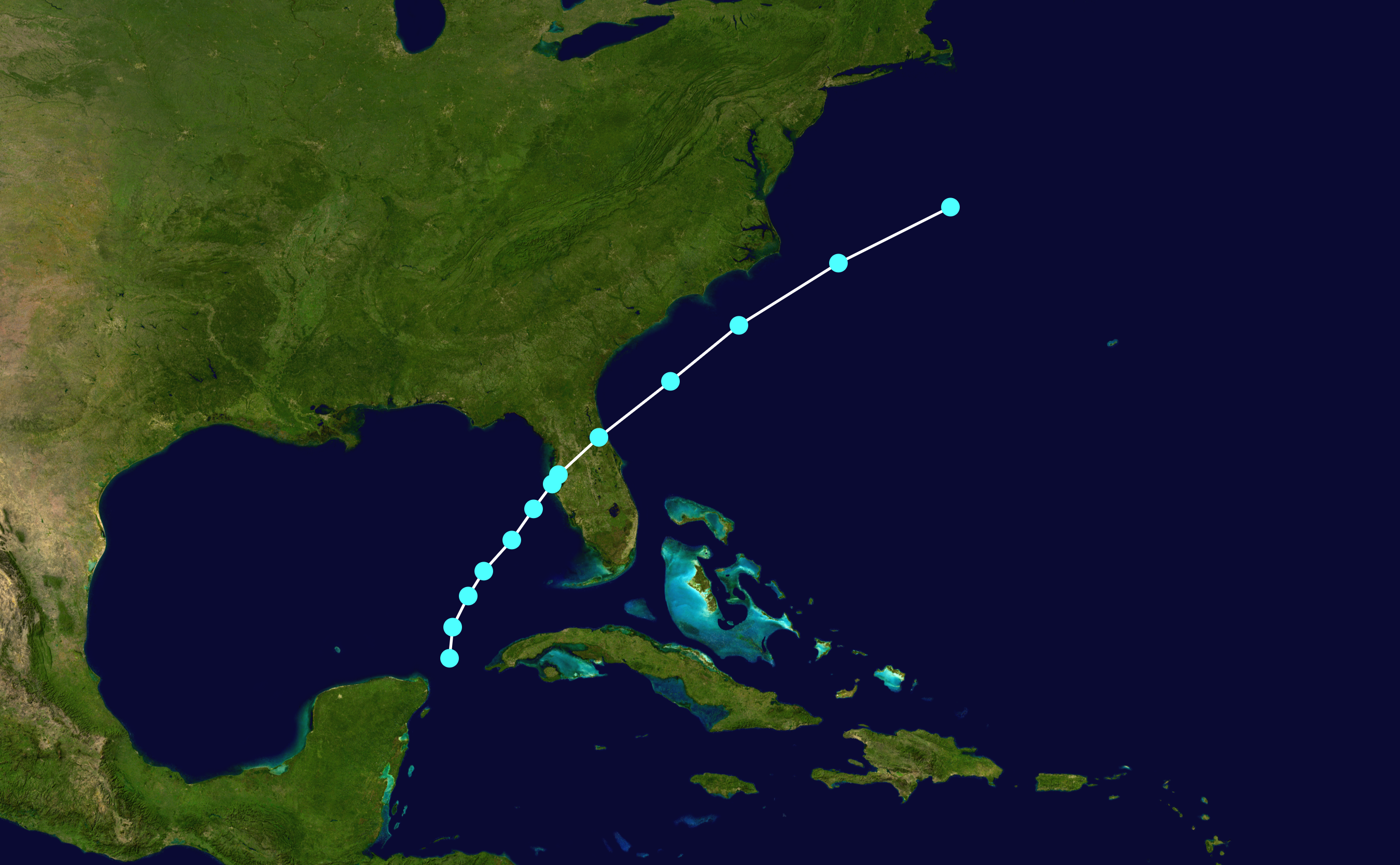
- Duration: September 22 – September 24
- Peak intensity: 60 mph (95 km/h) (1-min);

A few days after the previous storm, another storm was observed just north of the Yucatán Channel in the eastern Gulf of Mexico on September 22. Tracking northeastward, the storm reached sustained winds of 60 mph (95 km/h) before making landfall near present-day Madeira Beach, Florida, around 10:00 UTC on the following day. Little impact occurred, with the Tampa Guardian only reporting "beating showers and driving winds." The cyclone emerged into the Atlantic near Palm Coast late on September 23 and continued rapidly northeastward. Presumably, the schooner H. Hulrburt made the last encounter with this storm on September 24, with the official track ending about midway between Bermuda and Long Island, New York, on that day. Chenoweth's reanalysis, published in 2014, proposes removing this cyclone from HURDAT, instead classifying it as a weak frontal boundary.

=== Hurricane Five ===
- Category 3 hurricane (SSHWS)
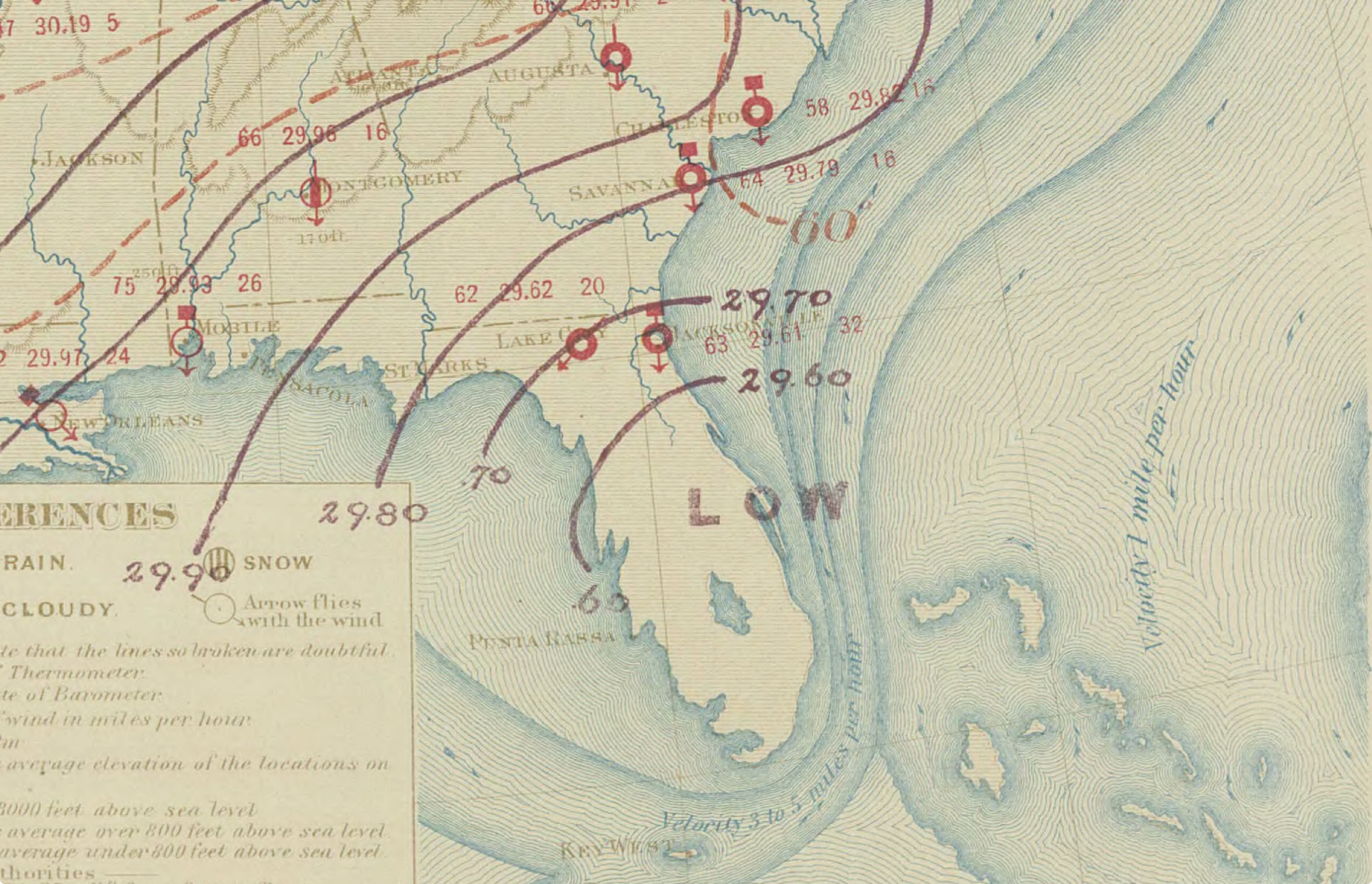
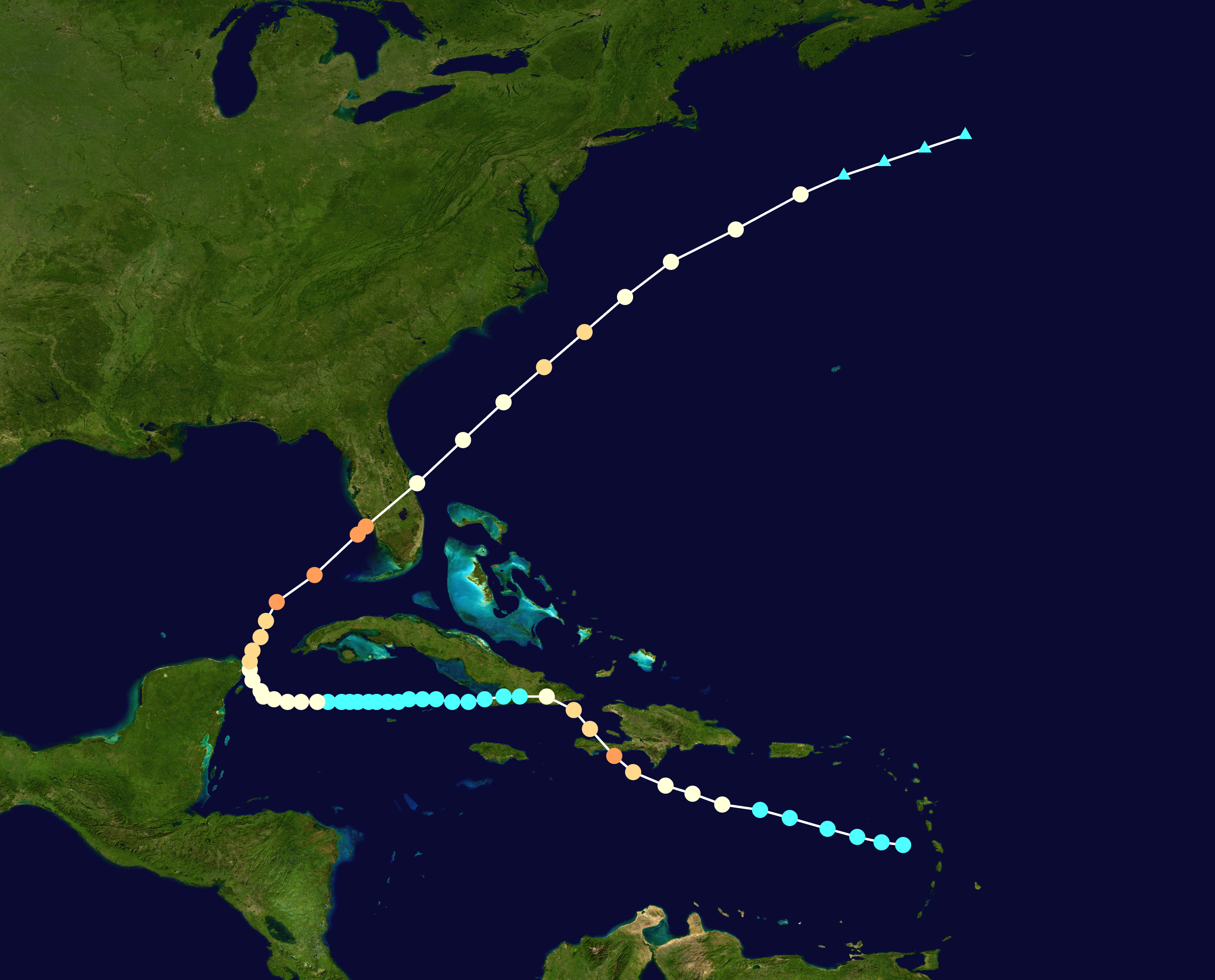
- Duration: September 26 – October 9
- Peak intensity: 115 mph (185 km/h) (1-min); 959 mbar (hPa)

A tropical storm was first seen in the eastern Caribbean Sea near Martinique on September 26. It moved west-northwestward and likely intensified into a hurricane by the following day. It then moved northwestward, hitting Haiti's Tiburon Peninsula just west of Jacmel on September 28 with winds of 115 mph (185 km/h). A weather station at Jacmel registered a barometric pressure of 28.60 inHg (969 mb), outside the eye. Briefly re-emerging into the Caribbean, the storm struck Cuba near Guantánamo Bay early the next day at a slightly weaker intensity, with winds of 105 mph (165 km/h). The system then turned westward over southern Oriente Province and soon weakened to a tropical storm, before again re-entering the Caribbean early on September 30. By October 3, the cyclone re-strengthened into a hurricane over the northwest Caribbean. After curving northward a few days later, the system passed just offshore the Yucatán Peninsula as it entered the Gulf of Mexico on October 5. Thereafter, the hurricane accelerated northeastward and re-intensified to reach sustained winds of 115 mph (185 km/h) prior to making landfall near Punta Rassa, Florida, early on October 7. The lowest pressure on land was estimated to be 959 mb (28.3 inHg), based on observations from Punta Rassa. The system emerged into the Atlantic near present-day Melbourne several hours later and continued northeastward until October 9, when it became an extratropical cyclone, which dissipated on the following day.

In Haiti, severe damage occurred in the Jacmel area, while The New York Times reported a "considerable loss of life." The storm demolished some 200 homes, downed "immense" trees, and wrecked many vessels in the port. Additionally, Jacmel suffered the total loss of its prison and a church sustained major damage. Similar impacts occurred in the Guantánamo Bay area of Cuba, with a number of vessels beached and many homes being unroofed. The steamer Maisi capsized near Isla de la Juventud, drowning 24 people. After the storm entered the Gulf of Mexico, the Havana area reported high tides and strong winds on October 6 and October 7. Waves caused extensive damage to the interior of homes along San Lazaro street and flooded many other roads, reportedly drowning several people. Telegraph lines were downed throughout the island. In Florida, Key West reported sustained winds of 80 mph (130 km/h), while Punta Rassa observed sustained winds of 90 mph (140 km/h). The latter also recorded a 14-foot (4.3 m) storm tide and a barometric pressure of 961.6 mbar (28.40 inHg); the high tide "completely inundated" and swept away the settlement. On Biscayne Bay storm tides ran 6 to 8 ft (1.8 to 2.4 m) above normal, and hurricane-force winds badly damaged exposed vegetation. Several vessels wrecked or became disabled by the storm, including one along the then-isolated southeast coast of the state, with the crew not rescued for several days. This led to the establishment of the Houses of Refuge at the behest of Sumner Increase Kimball. The hurricane may have also caused the schooner Missouri to capsize in the Bahamas at a reef near Bimini. Overall, at least 26 deaths are attributed to the storm.

In a reanalysis study published in 2014, Chenoweth extends both the beginning and end of the storm's duration by one day. Additionally, the proposed changes also suggest the cyclone remained much closer to the south coast of Cuba and did not weaken to a tropical storm after striking the island.

=== Other storms ===
Chenoweth proposed three new storms in his reanalysis study, published in 2014. The first unofficial storm formed over the central Atlantic well east-northeast of Bermuda on August 18. Moving generally northeastward, the system transitioned into an extratropical cyclone on August 25 to the east of Newfoundland. On October 1, another unofficial storm developed just east of the Cabo Verde Islands. The cyclone soon crossed through the islands and intensified into a hurricane by October 3. It curved northwestward and then northeastward over the central Atlantic, before weakening to a tropical storm on October 7 and being last noted on the next day. A third and final proposed storm formed about halfway between Bermuda and the Madeira archipelago on October 16. The system maintained hurricane status for 12 hours on October 17, before weakening to a tropical storm early the following day and transitioning into an extratropical storm northwest of the Azores several hours later.

== Season effects ==
This is a table of all of the known storms that formed in the 1873 Atlantic hurricane season. It includes their known duration (within the basin), areas affected, damages, and death totals. Deaths in parentheses are additional and indirect (an example of an indirect death would be a traffic accident), but were still related to that storm. Damage and deaths include totals while the storm was extratropical, a wave, or a low, and all of the damage figures are in 1873 USD.

Saffir–Simpson scale
TD	TS	C1	C2	C3	C4	C5

1873 North Atlantic tropical cyclone season statistics
Storm name	Dates active	Storm category at peak intensity	Max 1-min wind mph (km/h)	Min. press. (mbar)	Areas affected	Damage (US$)	Deaths	Ref(s).
One	June 1–2	Tropical storm	45 (75)	Unknown	Southeastern United States (Georgia)	Unknown	None	
Two	August 13–27	Category 3 hurricane	115 (185)	962	Maine, Atlantic Canada (Newfoundland)	$3.5 million	223-600	
Three	September 18–20	Category 1 hurricane	80 (130)	982	Southeastern United States (Florida)	>$550,000	3-4	
Four	September 22–24	Tropical storm	60 (95)	Unknown	Florida	Unknown	None	
Five	September 26 – October 9	Category 3 hurricane	115 (185)	959	Greater Antilles (Haiti and Cuba), Florida, Bahamas	Unknown	≥26	
Season aggregates
5 systems	June 1 – October 9		115 (185)	959		>$4.055 million	252-630	

== See also ==
- List of Florida hurricanes (pre-1900)
- List of hurricanes in Canada
- List of Newfoundland hurricanes
- Tropical cyclone observation
