= Yent Mound =

Archaeological site in Florida, United States

- U.S. National Register of Historic Places
- Location within Florida Location within the United States
- Location: Franklin County, Florida
- Nearest city: St. Teresa
- Coordinates: 29.9°N 84.365°W
- NRHP reference No.: 73000577
- Added to NRHP: May 24, 1973

The Yent Mound (8FR5) is a Santa Rosa-Swift Creek culture archaeological site located on Alligator Harbor west of St. Teresa, Florida. It is on the east side of County Road 370, approximately 2.5 miles from the junction of U.S. Route 98. On May 24, 1973, it was added to the U.S. National Register of Historic Places.

The Yent Mound was constructed by people of the Deptford culture around the beginning of the Current Era. William Sears defined the archaeological Yent complex based on artifacts found in the Yent Mound, Pierce Mound and Crystal River Mounds. The Yent complex was related to the Hopewell tradition, and some of the artifacts were trade items from the Hopewell area.

== See also ==
- List of burial mounds in the United States
