= Pierre Viaud =

Pierre Viaud was the author of a book titled Shipwreck and Adventures of Monsieur Pierre Viaud. First published in French in 1768 and in English in 1771, the book was reprinted several times in both languages and was an 18th-century international bestseller.

It tells the story of the shipwreck on 16 February 1766 of Le Tigre, a French merchant brigantine on which Viaud was a passenger. The ship was wrecked en route to New Orleans 300 yards east of Dog Island in a great storm.
