= 1899 Atlantic hurricane season =

- Season summary map

Seasonal boundaries
- First system formed: June 26, 1899
- Last system dissipated: November 10, 1899

Strongest storm
- Name: "San Ciriaco"
  - Maximum winds: 150 mph (240 km/h) (1-minute sustained)
  - Lowest pressure: 930 mbar (hPa; 27.46 inHg)

Seasonal statistics
- Total depressions: 10
- Total storms: 10
- Hurricanes: 5
- Major hurricanes (Cat. 3+): 2
- Total fatalities: 3,885
- Total damage: ≥ $21.21 million (1899 USD)

Related article
- 1890s North Indian Ocean cyclone seasons

The 1899 Atlantic hurricane season featured the longest-lasting tropical cyclone in the Atlantic basin on record. There were nine tropical storms, of which five became hurricanes. Two of those strengthened into major hurricanes, which are Category 3 or higher on the modern day Saffir–Simpson scale. The first system was initially observed in the northeastern Gulf of Mexico on June 26. The tenth and final system dissipated near Bermuda on November 10. These dates fall within the period with the most tropical cyclone activity in the Atlantic. In post-season analysis, two tropical cyclones that existed in October were added to HURDAT – the official Atlantic hurricane database. At one point during the season, September 3 through the following day, a set of three tropical cyclones existed simultaneously.

The most significant storm of the season was Hurricane Three, nicknamed the San Ciriaco hurricane. A post-season analysis of this storm indicated that it was the longest-lasting Atlantic tropical cyclone on record. The path impacted the Lesser Antilles, Puerto Rico, Dominican Republic, the Bahamas, Florida, South Carolina, North Carolina, Virginia, and the Azores. The San Ciriaco hurricane alone caused about $20 million (1899 US$) in damage and at least 3,855 deaths. (Note: All damage figures are in 1899 US$, unless otherwise noted) Another notable tropical cyclone, the Carrabelle hurricane, brought extensive damage to Dominican Republic and Florida panhandle. Losses in Florida reached about $1 million. At least nine deaths were associated with the storm. Hurricane Nine in October brought flooding to Cuba and Jamaica, as well as minor damage to South Carolina, North Carolina, and Virginia.

== Systems ==
=== Tropical Storm One ===
- Tropical storm (SSHWS)
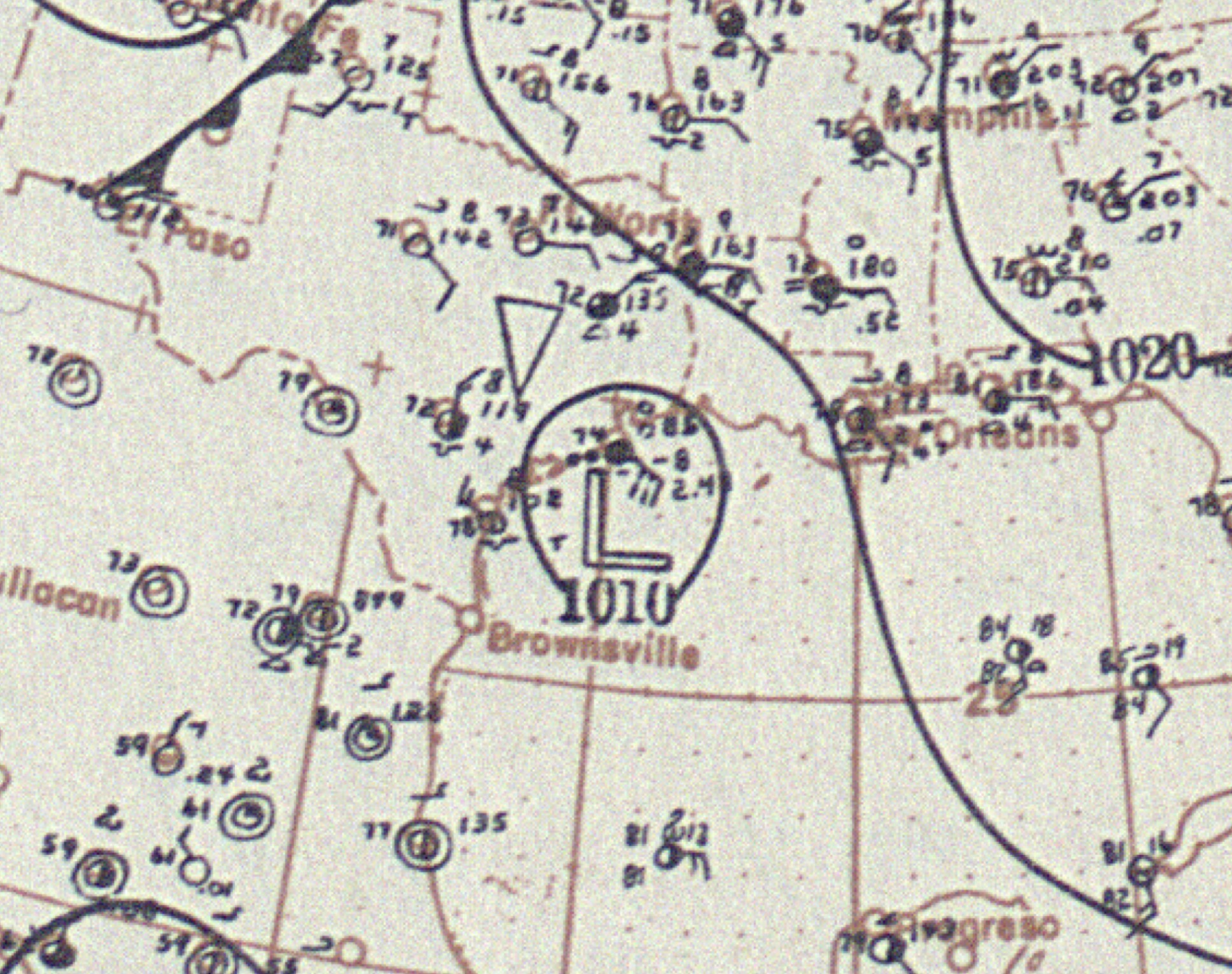
- Duration: June 26 – June 27
- Peak intensity: 40 mph (65 km/h) (1-min);

Weather maps first indicated a tropical storm in the extreme northwestern Gulf of Mexico on June 26. With initial sustained winds of 40 mph (64 km/h), the storm did not differ in intensity as it headed northwestward. At 0900 UTC on June 27, the system made landfall near the southwestern end of Galveston Island, Texas at the same intensity. Three hours later, it weakened to a tropical depression and later dissipated over Southeast Texas at 1800 UTC. Heavy rainfall produced by the storm from Granbury to Waco and toward the coast contributed to an ongoing flood event in the state. According to Texas State Senator Asbury Bascom Davidson, the Brazos, Colorado, Guadalupe rivers overflowed, while other reports note that the Navasota and San Saba rivers also exceeded their banks. Consequently, an estimated 12,000 sq mi (31,000 km^{2}) of land was inundated. In Hearne, water rose above every rain gauge. Thousands of people were left homeless. The flood caused $9 million in damage and 284 deaths.

=== Hurricane Two ===
- Category 2 hurricane (SSHWS)
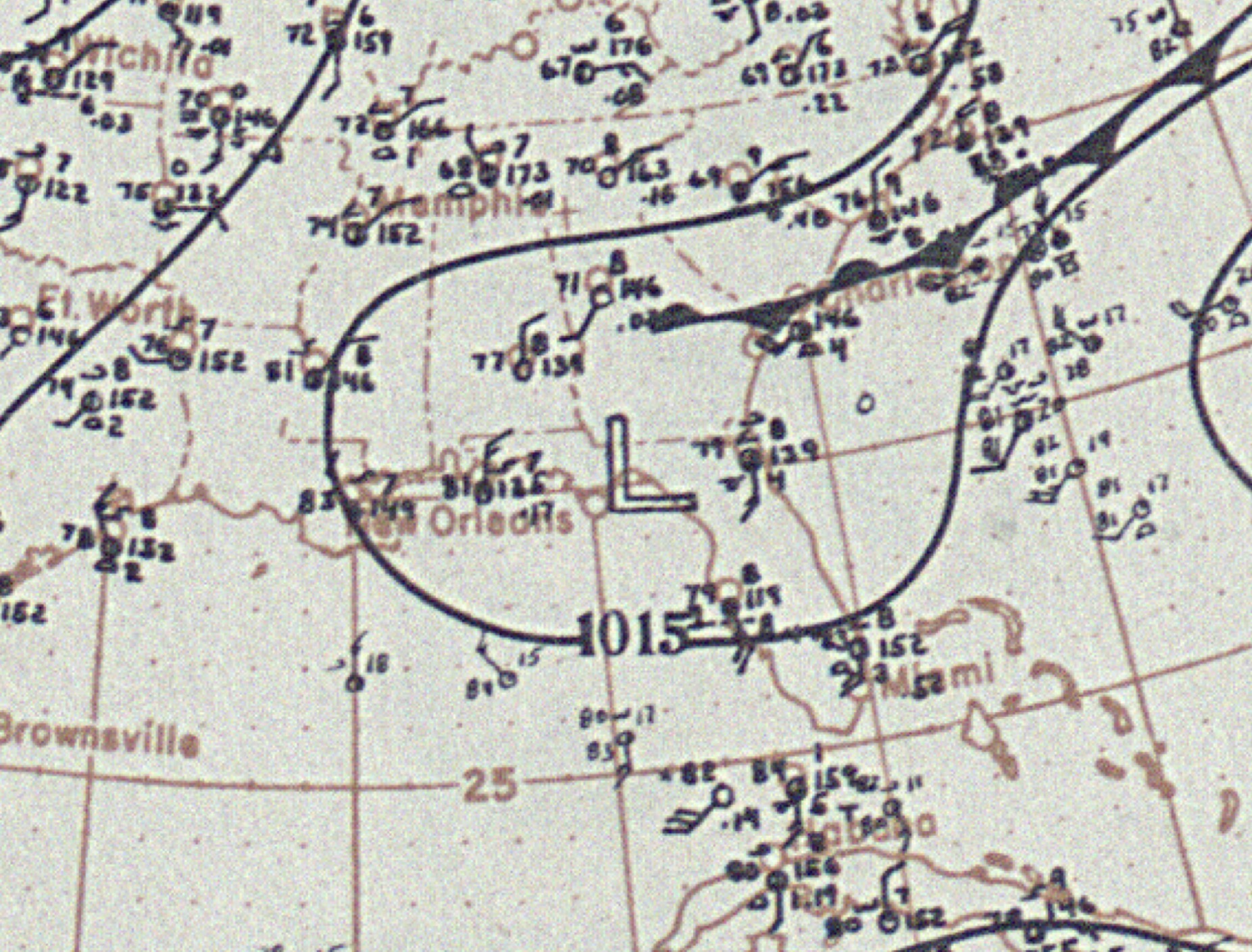
- Duration: July 28 – August 2
- Peak intensity: 100 mph (155 km/h) (1-min); 979 mbar (hPa)

The 1899 Carrabelle Hurricane

A hurricane was first observed south of Dominican Republic on July 28. Shortly thereafter, it made landfall in Azua Province with an intensity equivalent to a Category 1 hurricane. Early on July 29, the system weakened to a tropical storm, shortly before emerging into the southwestern Atlantic Ocean. It then moved west-northwestward and remained at relatively the same intensity over the next 24 hours. The storm made landfall near Islamorada, Florida, on July 30. Crossing the Florida Keys, it soon emerged into the Gulf of Mexico. The storm began to re-intensify on July 31 and became a hurricane later that day. Early on August 1, it peaked with winds of 100 mph (160 km/h), several hours before making landfall near Apalachicola, Florida, at the same intensity. The storm quickly weakened inland and dissipated over southern Alabama on August 2.

In Dominican Republic, three large schooners were wrecked at Santo Domingo; only one crew member on the three vessels survived. "Great" damage was reported along coastal sections of the country, while a loss of telegraph service impacted most of interior areas. In Florida, damage in the city of Carrabelle was extensive, with no more than a score of "unimportant" houses remained. Losses in the city reached approximately $100,000. At least 57 shipping vessels were destroyed; damage from these ships collectively totaled about $375,000. Additionally, 13 lumber vessels were beached. Many boats at the harbor and the wharfs in Lanark were wrecked. Large portions of stores and pavilions in the city were damaged. The towns of Curtis Mill and McIntyre were completely destroyed, while the resort city of St. Teresa suffered significant damage. Seven deaths were confirmed in Florida. Overall, losses reached at least $1 million.

=== Hurricane Three ===
- Category 4 hurricane (SSHWS)
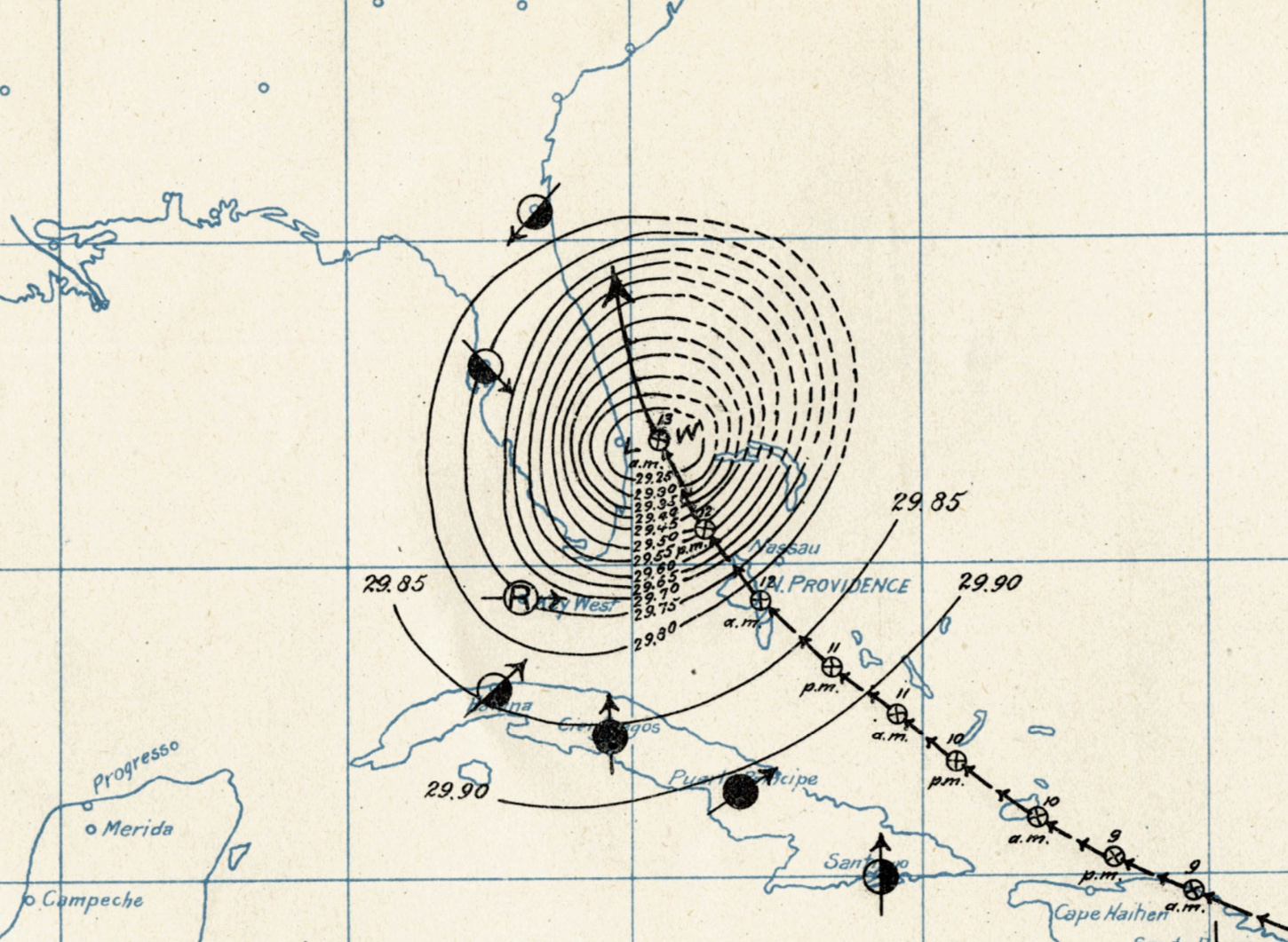
- Duration: August 3 – September 4
- Peak intensity: 150 mph (240 km/h) (1-min); 930 mbar (hPa)

Hurricane San Ciriaco of 1899 or The Great Bahamas Hurricane of 1899

The next storm was first observed as a tropical storm to the southwest of Cape Verde on August 3. It slowly strengthened while heading steadily west-northwestward across the Atlantic Ocean. By late on August 5, the storm strengthened into a hurricane. During the following 48 hours, it deepened further, reaching Category 4 hurricane status before crossing the Leeward Islands on August 7. Later that day, the storm attained its peak intensity with maximum sustained winds of 150 mph (240 km/h) and a minimum barometric pressure of 930 mbar (27 inHg). The storm weakened slightly before making landfall in Guayama, Puerto Rico, with sustained winds of 140 mph (230 km/h) on August 8. Several hours later, it emerged into the southwestern Atlantic as a Category 3 hurricane; it would remain at that intensity for over nine days. The system paralleled the north coast of Dominican Republic and then crossed the Bahamas, striking several islands, including Andros and Grand Bahama. After clearing the Bahamas, it began heading northward on August 14, while centered east of Florida. Early on the following day, the storm re-curved northeastward and appeared to be heading out to sea. However, by August 17, it turned back to the northwest. At 0100 UTC on August 18, the storm made landfall near Hatteras, North Carolina, with 120 mph (190 km/h) winds.

The storm weakened after moving inland and fell to Category 1 intensity by 1200 UTC on August 18. Later that day, the storm re-emerged into the Atlantic Ocean. Now heading northeastward, it continued weakening, but maintained Category 1 intensity. By late on August 20, the storm curved eastward over the northwestern Atlantic. It also began losing tropical characteristics and transitioned into an extratropical cyclone at 0000 UTC on August 22, while located about 325 mi (525 km) south of Sable Island. However, after four days, the system regenerated into a tropical storm while located about 695 mi (1,120 km) west-southwest of Flores Island in the Azores on August 26. It moved slowly north-northwestward, until curving to the east on August 29. Between August 26 and September 1, the storm did not differentiate in intensity, but began re-strengthening while turning southeastward on September 2. Early on the following day, the storm again reached hurricane intensity. It curved northeastward and passed through the Azores on September 3, shortly before transitioning into an extratropical cyclone. The storm had the longest duration of an Atlantic hurricane on record, lasting for 31 days, about 28 of which it was tropical.

In Guadeloupe, the storm unroofed and flooded many houses. Communications were significantly disrupted in the interior portions of the island. Impact was severe in Montserrat, with nearly every building destroyed and 100 deaths reported. About 200 small houses were destroyed on Saint Kitts, with estates suffering considerable damage, while nearly all estates were destroyed on Saint Croix. Eleven deaths were reported on the island. In Puerto Rico, the system brought strong winds and heavy rainfall, which caused extensive flooding. Approximately 250,000 people were left without food and shelter. Additionally, telephone, telegraph, and electrical services were completely lost. Overall, damage totaled approximately $20 million, with over half were losses inflicted on crops, particularly coffee. At the time, it was the costliest and worst tropical cyclone in Puerto Rico. It was officially estimated that the storm caused 3,369 fatalities in Puerto Rico. In the Bahamas, strong winds and waves sank 50 small crafts, most of them at Andros. Severe damage was reported in the capital city of Nassau, with over 100 buildings destroyed and many damaged, including the Government House. A few houses were also destroyed in Bimini. The death toll in the Bahamas was at least 125. In North Carolina, storm surge and rough sea destroyed fishing piers and bridges, as well as sink about 10 vessels. Because Hatteras Island was almost entirely inundated with 4 to 10 feet (1.2 to 3.0 m) of water, a great proportion of homes on the island were damaged, with much destruction at Diamond City. There were at least 20 deaths in the state of North Carolina. In the Azores, the storm also caused one fatality and significant damage on some islands.

=== Hurricane Four ===
- Category 2 hurricane (SSHWS)
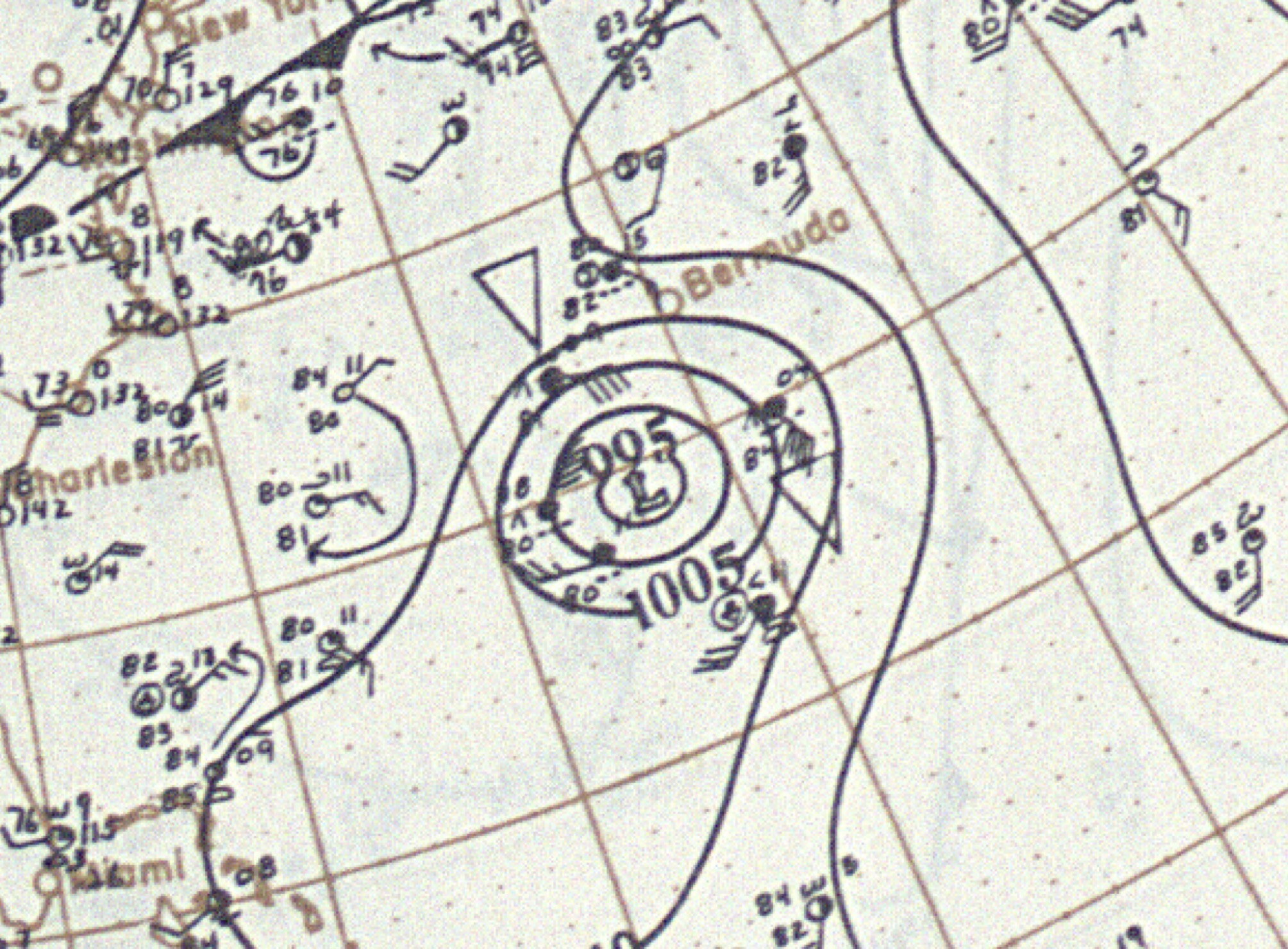
- Duration: August 29 – September 5
- Peak intensity: 105 mph (165 km/h) (1-min);

Weather maps indicated a tropical storm just east of the Lesser Antilles beginning on August 29. The storm moved westward and strengthened into a hurricane early on August 30. Several hours later, it entered the Caribbean Sea after passing near Antigua and Montserrat. Impact was generally light in the Lesser Antilles. At San Juan, Puerto Rico, sustained winds reached 48 mph (77 km/h). The storm maintained winds of 80 mph (130 km/h) as it continued westward across the Caribbean Sea. Vessels sailing from ports in Cuba and Hispaniola were advised to "take every precaution". After the storm curved northward late on September 1, vessels from Hispaniola only were advised to take caution.

Late on September 1, the hurricane made landfall east of Jacmel, Haiti with winds of 80 mph (130 km/h). By 1800 UTC, it weakened to a tropical storm. The storm emerged into the Atlantic Ocean early on September 2, after weakening further. While passing just east of the Turks and Caicos Islands early on September 3, the storm re-strengthened and attained hurricane status again. Several hours later, it strengthened into a Category 2 hurricane and peaked with winds of 105 mph (169 km/h). After weakening to a Category 1 hurricane late on September 4, the storm passed northwest of Bermuda. Hurricane-force winds caused considerable damage on the island. At 1200 UTC on September 5, the hurricane became extratropical.

=== Hurricane Five ===
- Category 3 hurricane (SSHWS)
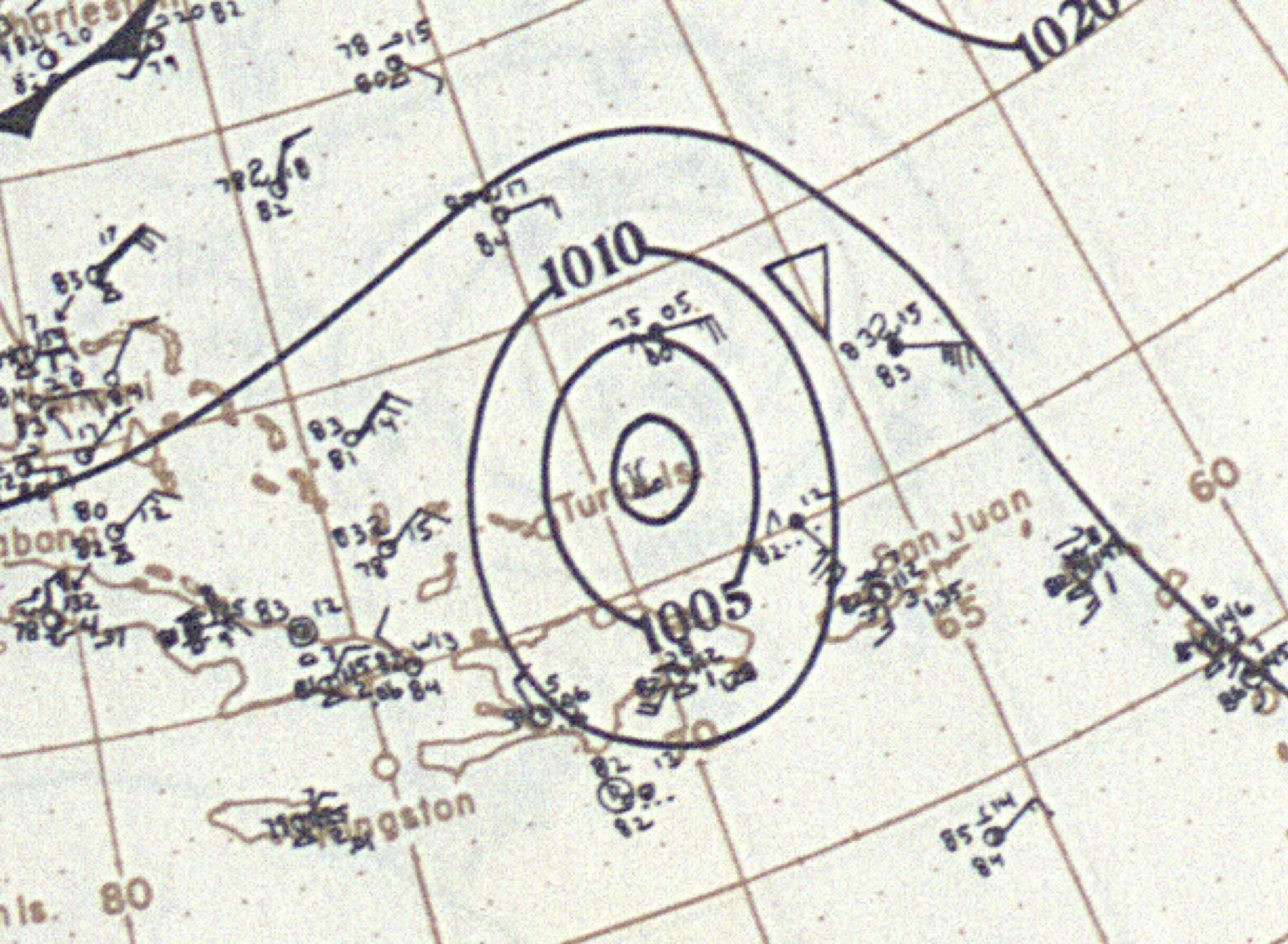
- Duration: September 3 – September 15
- Peak intensity: 120 mph (195 km/h) (1-min); 939 mbar (hPa)

HURDAT initially indicates a tropical storm about 920 mi (1,480 km) west-southwest of Brava, Cape Verde on September 3. The storm moved west-northwestward and slowly intensified, reaching hurricane status late on September 5. It continued to slowly strengthen, becoming a Category 2 hurricane on September 6. About 24 hours later, the cyclone deepened into a Category 3 hurricane while located near the Lesser Antilles. On Saint Kitts, sustained winds reached 62 mph (100 km/h), while up to 3.13 inches (80 mm) of rainfall was reported. Many houses were destroyed on Anguilla and Barbuda. In the former, an estimated 200 homes were demolished, leaving 800 people homeless. Early on September 9, the storm reached maximum sustained winds of 120 mph (190 km/h). The storm maintained intensity as a Category 3 hurricane and re-curved northward by September 11.

The hurricane turned northeastward on September 12 and began to accelerate. Early on September 13, it passed very close to Bermuda, with a minimum barometric pressure of 939 mbar (27.7 inHg) observed on the island. Cedar trees were uprooted, while fruit and ornamental trees were swept out to sea. Some houses were destroyed, while others were deroofed. Severe damage was also reported at the naval yard and colonial government buildings. At Her Majesty's Dockyard alone, damage was "at least five figures". Early on September 14, the storm weakened to a Category 2 hurricane, then to a Category 1 several hours later. Shortly after 0000 UTC on September 15, the hurricane struck the Avalon Peninsula of Newfoundland with winds of 85 mph (137 km/h). It soon became extratropical. In Newfoundland, severe damage was reported at fishing premises. The schooners Angler, Daisy, and Lily May either capsized or were driven ashore, resulting in 16 deaths.

=== Tropical Storm Six ===
- Tropical storm (SSHWS)
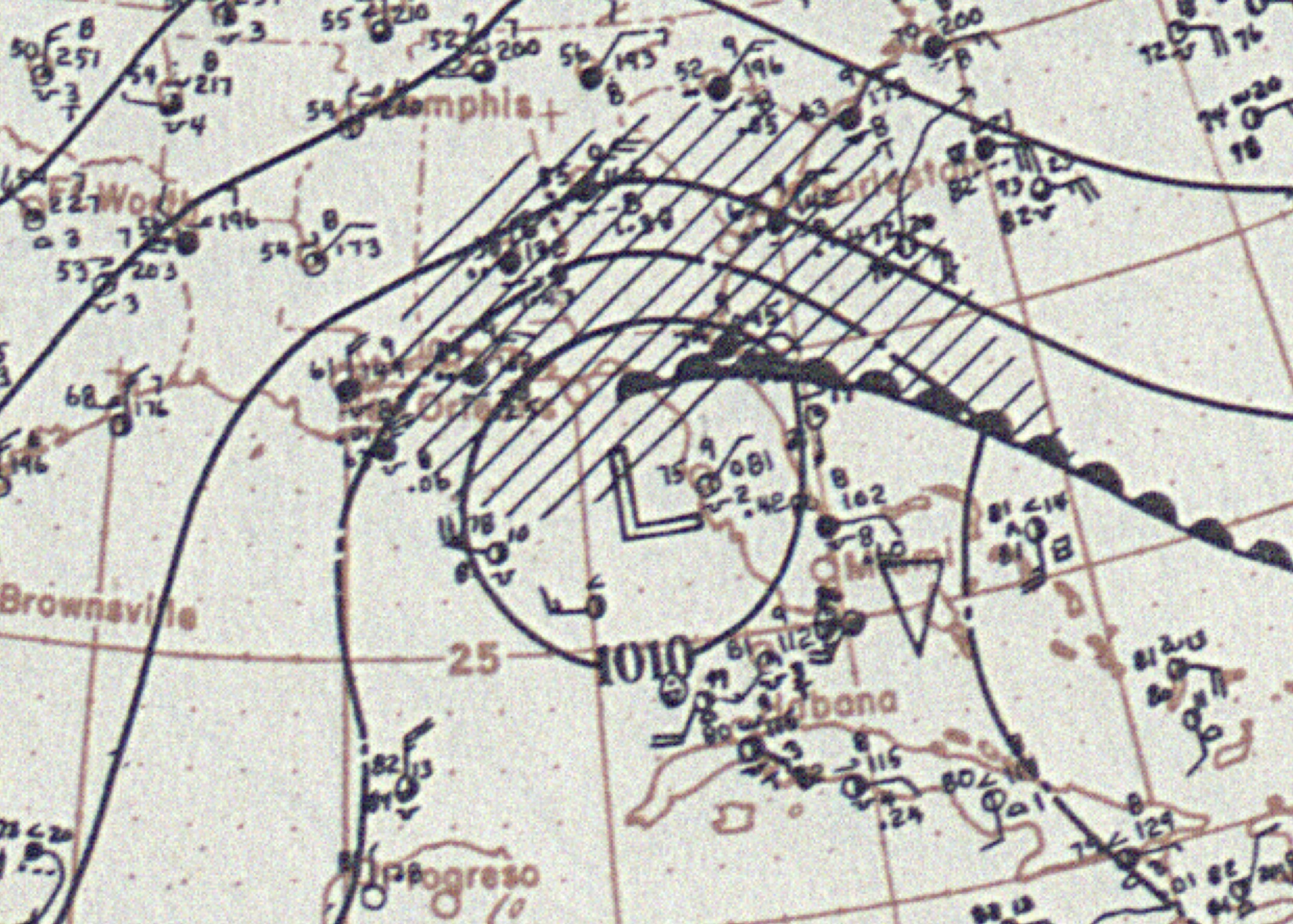
- Duration: October 2 – October 6
- Peak intensity: 60 mph (95 km/h) (1-min);

A ship in the western Caribbean Sea reported a tropical storm on October 2. The storm moved north-northwestward and entered the Gulf of Mexico early on the following day. Late on October 3, it peaked with maximum sustained winds of 60 mph (97 km/h). The storm re-curved eastward while situated over the northeastern Gulf of Mexico. At 0000 UTC on October 5, this system made landfall in modern-day Largo, Florida at the same intensity. Thereafter, the storm headed northeastward, until becoming extratropical early on October 6, while located offshore Georgia.

Impact from this system was generally minor. Prior to landfall in Florida, the storm produced winds up to 40 mph (64 km/h) in Port Eads, Louisiana. The highest wind speed in Florida was 37 mph (60 km/h) in Jupiter. There, the storm also dropped 4.94 inches (125 mm) of rain. The Jupiter area also reported rough seas, with the highest tides in 7 years. The storm wrecked two schooners – the John R. Anidia at Fernandina Beach and the John H. Tingue at Cumberland Island, Georgia. After becoming extratropical, the remnants of the storm brought wind gusts up to 56 mph (90 km/h) to Cape Henry, Virginia and Block Island, Rhode Island.

=== Tropical Storm Seven ===
- Tropical storm (SSHWS)
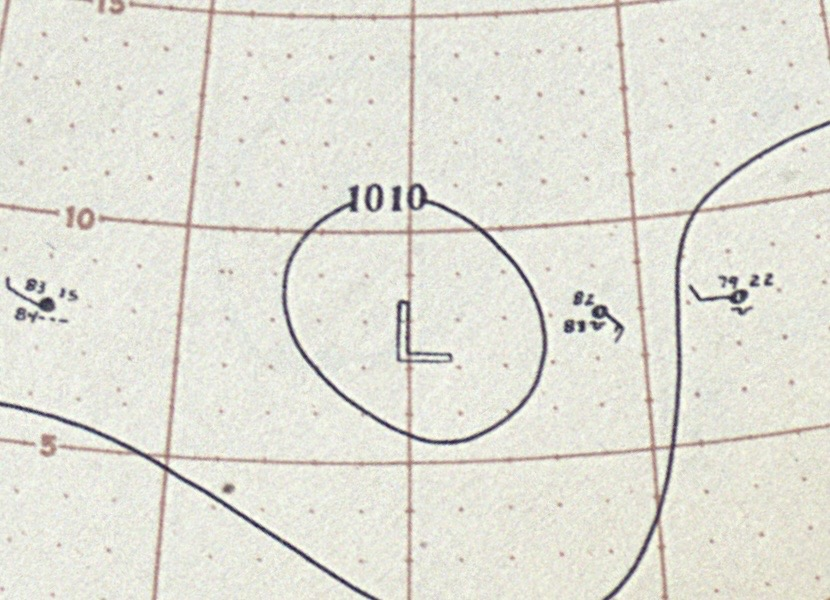
- Duration: October 10 – October 14
- Peak intensity: 45 mph (75 km/h) (1-min);

Reports from a ship on October 10 indicated a tropical storm with sustained winds of 45 mph (72 km/h) and a minimum barometric pressure of 1,008 mbar (29.8 inHg). Located well southwest of Cape Verde, the storm moved northwestward without differentiating in intensity. It was lasted noted on October 14, while situated at 21.5°N, 43.5°W.

=== Tropical Storm Eight ===
- Tropical storm (SSHWS)
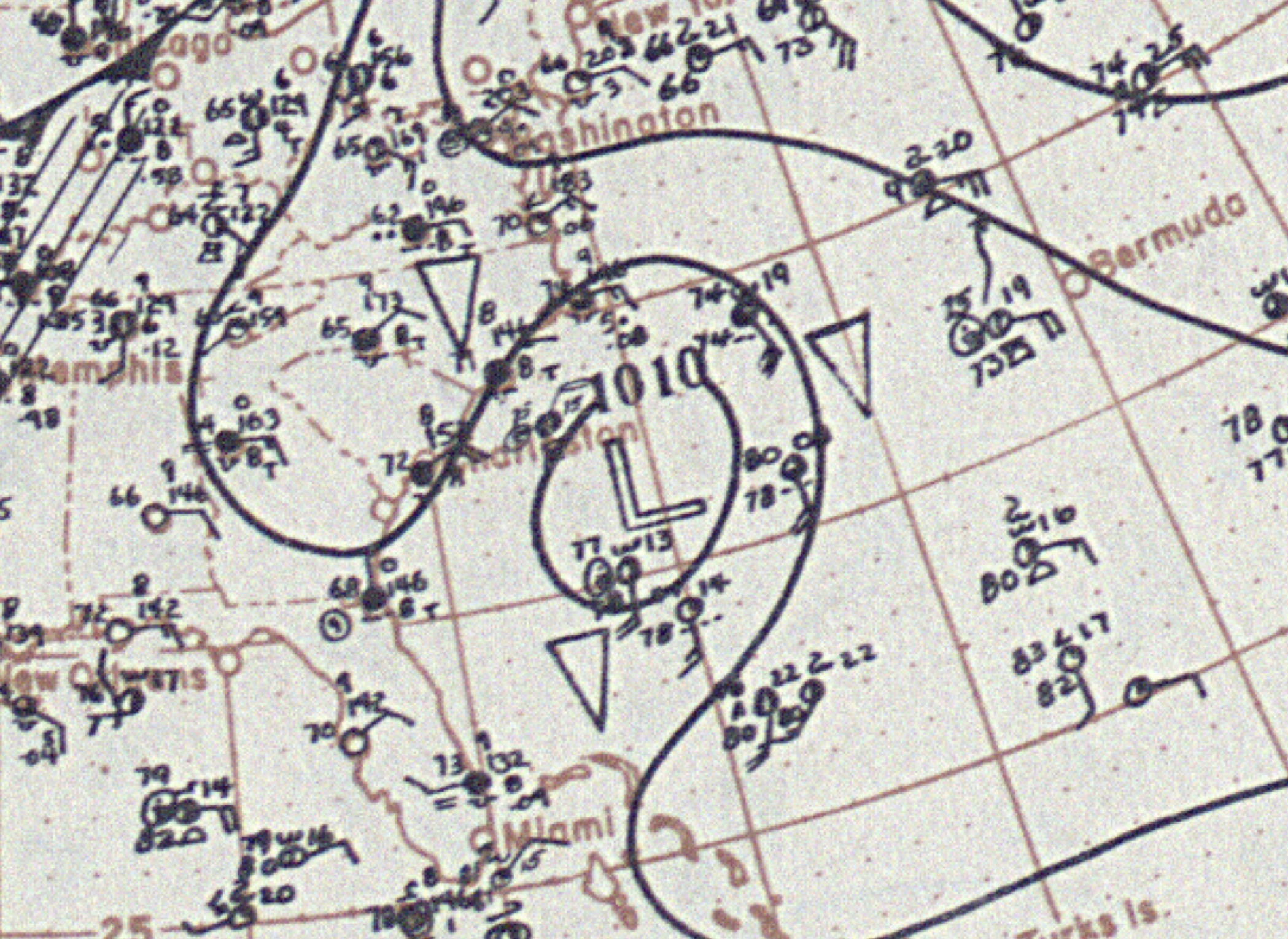
- Duration: October 15 – October 18
- Peak intensity: 45 mph (75 km/h) (1-min);

A tropical depression developed in the central Bahamas on October 15. The depression moved east-northeastward strengthened into a tropical storm by the following day. Later on October 16, the storm peaked with winds of 45 mph (72 km/h). It re-curved northwestward and slowly began to weaken. Early on October 18, the system fell to tropical depression intensity. Several hours later, the cyclone dissipated while located about 195 mi (315 km) east-southeast of Virginia Beach, Virginia.

=== Hurricane Nine ===
- Category 2 hurricane (SSHWS)
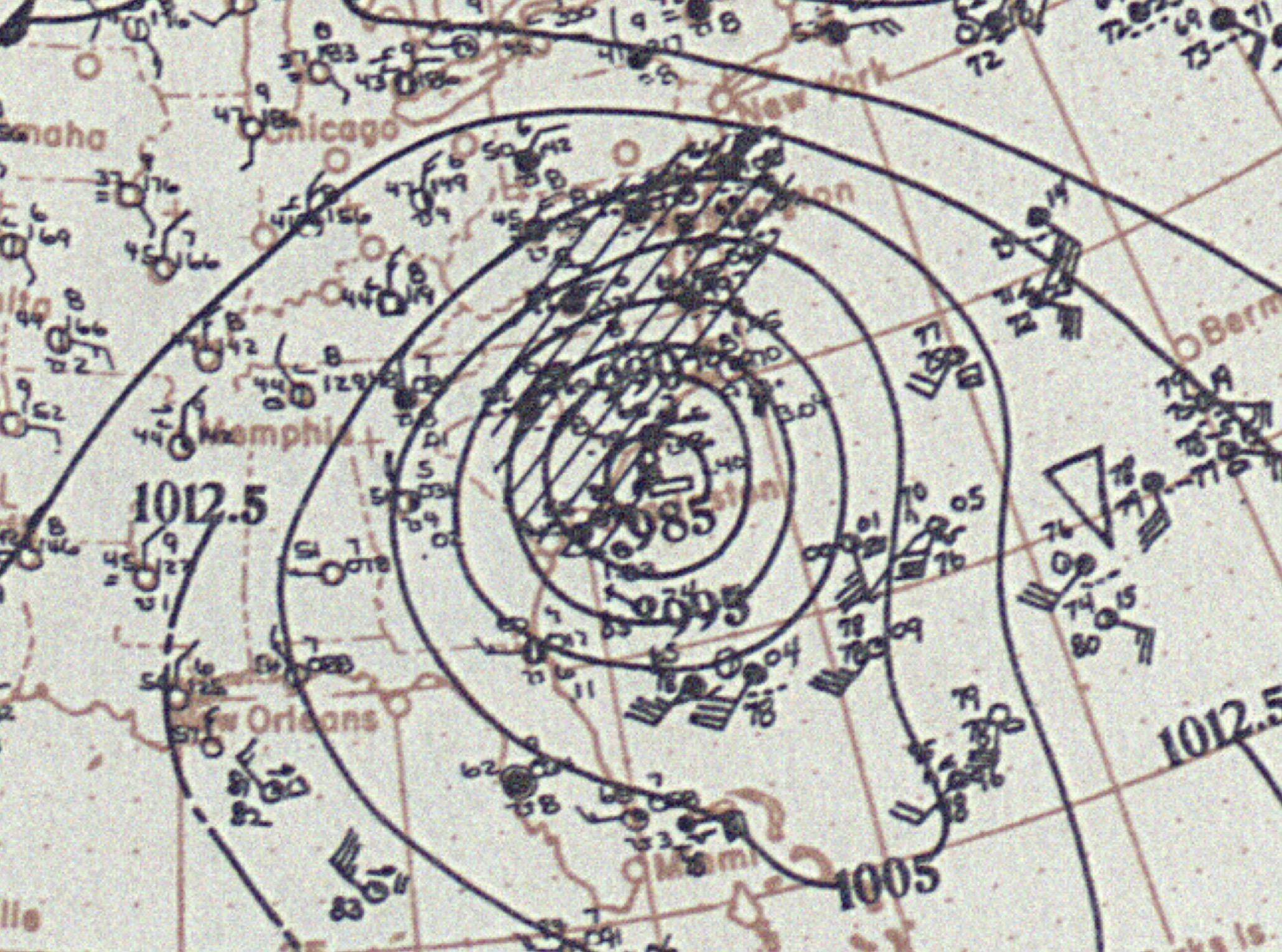
- Duration: October 26 – October 31
- Peak intensity: 110 mph (175 km/h) (1-min); 955 mbar (hPa)

An area of disturbed weather developed into a tropical storm while located south-southwest of Jamaica on October 26. The system moved slowly north-northwestward and gradually strengthened, reaching hurricane status on October 28. By early on the following day, it made landfall on the southern coast of Sancti Spíritus Province, Cuba. Briefly weakening to a tropical storm, the system re-intensified into a hurricane after reaching the Atlantic Ocean late on October 29. Moving toward the Bahamas, the storm became a Category 2 hurricane on October 30. Around that time, it struck Grand Bahama island. After peaking with winds of 110 mph (180 km/h), the system accelerated north-northwestward and made landfall near Myrtle Beach, South Carolina, on October 31. The cyclone then quickly weakened and became extratropical over Virginia later that day.

In the city of Black River, Jamaica, rough seas caused significant damage to the marine industry and washed out crops. There were "many dead" in Jamaica, though the actual number of fatalities is unknown. Damage from the storm in Cuba was reported in the Sancti Spíritus and Santa Clara Provinces. Due to the threat of the Zaza River overflowing, residents were forced to evacuate. Strong winds and flooding destroyed several houses and severely damaged a number of others. At Wrightsville Beach, North Carolina, tides were reported as 8 feet (2.4 m) above normal. Water came over the wharves in Wilmington and inundated some streets; there was also flooding in New Bern, Morehead City, and Beaufort. One steamer was wrecked on the coast and 10 smaller vessels were driven ashore. One fatality was reported and damage was estimated at $200,000.

=== Tropical Storm Ten ===
- Tropical storm (SSHWS)
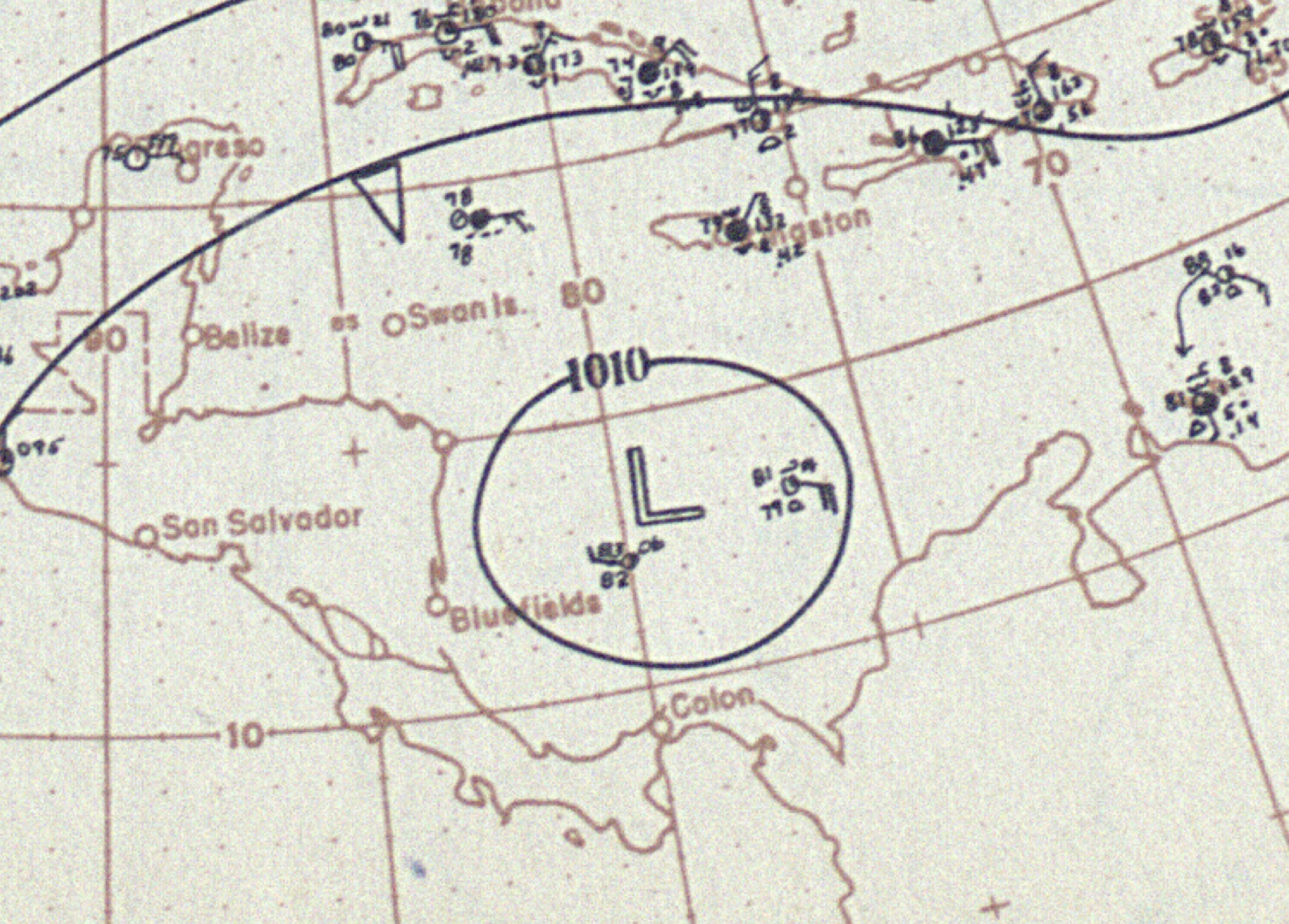
- Duration: November 7 – November 10
- Peak intensity: 65 mph (100 km/h) (1-min);

A ship observed a tropical storm north of Panama on November 7. The storm strengthened and headed northeastward across the central Caribbean Sea. It curved northward on November 8, around the time of peaking with winds of 65 mph (105 km/h). Later that day, the storm made landfall in Saint Thomas Parish, Jamaica, at the same intensity. Thereafter, the system weakened and struck extreme western Santiago de Cuba Province, Cuba, with winds of 50 mph (80 km/h) on November 9. It continued to weaken while crossing the island and emerged into the southwestern Atlantic Ocean later that day. The storm curved northeastward and passed through the Bahamas on November 10. It then weakened to a tropical depression, several hours before dissipating about 385 mi (620 km) southeast of Bermuda.

The storm brought strong winds and heavy rainfall to Jamaica and Cuba. Significant damage was reported at Port Antonio, Jamaica, especially to the property and agriculture of the United Fruit Company. Several districts of Saint Thomas Parish became isolated and the town of Morant Bay was "shattered", according to The New York Times. In Cuba, rainfall peaked at 5.7 in (140 mm) in the city of Santiago de Cuba. Damage to buildings and crops were reported in the region. Four fatalities occurred when a tree fell on a farmhouse in Manzanillo, Granma Province.

== Season effects ==
This is a table of all of the known storms that have formed in the 1899 Atlantic hurricane season. It includes their duration, landfall, damages, and death totals. Deaths in parentheses are additional and indirect (an example of an indirect death would be a traffic accident), but were still related to that storm. Damage and deaths include totals while the storm was extratropical, a wave, or a low, and all of the damage figures are in 1899 USD.

Saffir–Simpson scale
TD	TS	C1	C2	C3	C4	C5

1899 North Atlantic tropical cyclone season statistics
Storm name	Dates active	Storm category at peak intensity	Max 1-min wind mph (km/h)	Min. press. (mbar)	Areas affected	Damage (US$)	Deaths	Ref(s).
One	June 26–27	Tropical storm	40 (65)	Unknown	Texas	Unknown	Unknown	
Two	July 28 – August 2	Category 2 hurricane	100 (155)	979	Hispaniola (Dominican Republic)	>$1 million	9	
Three	August 3 – September 4	Category 4 hurricane	150 (240)	930	Lesser Antilles (Guadeloupe and Puerto Rico), Bahamas, Southeastern United States (North Carolina), Azores	>$20 million	3,855	
Four	August 29 – September 5	Category 2 hurricane	105 (165)	Unknown	Lesser Antilles, Greater Antilles (Haiti), Bermuda	Unknown	Unknown	
Five	September 3–15	Category 3 hurricane	120 (195)	939	Lesser Antilles, Bermuda, Newfoundland	>$10,000	16	
Six	October 2–6	Tropical storm	60 (95)	Unknown	Gulf Coast of the United States (Florida), East Coast of the United States	Unknown	None	
Seven	October 10–14	Tropical storm	45 (75)	Unknown	None	None	None	
Eight	October 15–18	Tropical storm	45 (75)	Unknown	Bahamas, North Carolina	None	None	
Nine	October 26–31	Category 2 hurricane	110 (175)	955	Jamaica, Cuba (Sancti Spíritus Province), Bahamas, North Carolina, Virginia, Northeastern United States	>$200,000	>1	
Ten	November 7–10	Tropical storm	45 (75)	Unknown	Greater Antilles (Cuba), Bahamas	Unknown	4	
Season aggregates
10 systems	June 26 – November 10		150 (240)	930		>$21.21 million	3,885	

== See also ==
- Atlantic hurricane reanalysis project
- Tropical cyclone observation
