= Dog Island (Florida) =

Island in Florida, United States

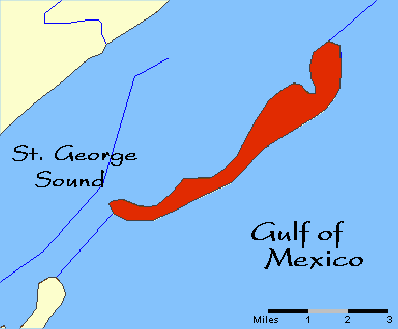
- Dog Island, Florida

- Dog Island

Geography
- Coordinates: 29.80°N 84.61°W

Administration
- United States
- State: Florida
- County: Franklin

Dog Island is located in the northwestern Florida Gulf coast, just 3.5 mi (5.6 km) off-shore from Carrabelle, in Franklin County, Florida. There is, by reservation, ferry transportation to Dog Island on weekends.

There are no stores, restaurants, or public restrooms on Dog Island. A hotel, the Pelican Inn, closed in 2016. The island is less than one mile wide at its widest, and just under seven miles long. The bulk of the island is owned by The Nature Conservancy and is a wilderness preserve. Bird nesting sites on several areas of the east end and west end of the island are strictly off-limits for people and pets. There is a volunteer fire department. Electricity and trash pickup are available.

Much of the island is within the Dog Island Conservation District, an independent special district and political subdivision of the State of Florida, created to guide development and help preserve the island.

The island is home to the Dog Island wren, a subspecies of the Carolina wren only found on Dog Island.

== Airport ==
Dog Island Airport
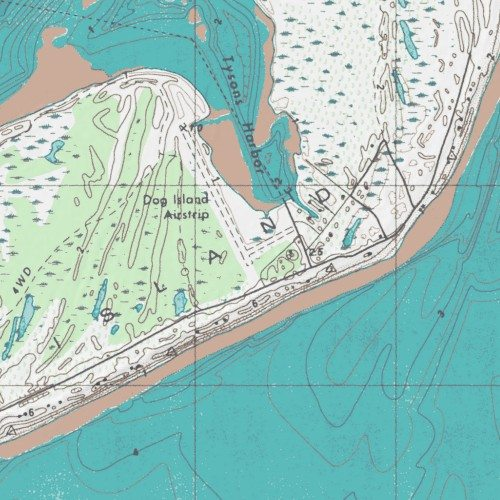
- USGS Topographic Map
- IATA: none; ICAO: none; FAA LID: FA43

Summary
- Airport type: Private
- Owner: Dog Island Conservation District
- Location: Dog Island, Florida
- Elevation AMSL: 4 ft (1.2 m)
- Interactive map of Dog Island Airport

Runways
Direction	Length		Surface
Direction	ft	m	Surface
15/33	2,700	823	Turf
- Source: Federal Aviation Administration

Dog Island Airport (FAA LID: FA43) is an un-towered, private use airport located by the Eastern bay of Dog Island. The airport opened in 1930.

== Origin ==
The island and its two small neighbors were discovered by the French in 1536 and named Dog Island, Isle des Chiens, because, according to different legends: 1) wild dogs were found on them; 2) the island resembles a crouched dog, or 3) the early ships put their common sailors — known as dogs — on the island before docking on the mainland so they could not jump ship. Later, the two neighbors were renamed: St. Vincent, which is a Federal wildlife refuge, and St. George, which has a causeway and an airport (FA43), has developed into a seaside vacation community with shops and beach rentals.

After World War II, Jeff Lewis, a Florida businessman, saw its potential as a vacation area and paid $12,000 for the island. Native Americans used Dog Island as a fishing camp, and the 1985 hurricanes uncovered potsherds on the west end of the island.

== History ==
Dog Island shows evidence of human presence dating back over 8,000 years. The island also has a rich maritime history. The discovery of a 9th-century canoe is a testament to prehistoric mariners on the island. During the 17th and 18th centuries, the barrier islands may have served as a haven for piracy and smuggling.

=== 18th century ===
On February 16, 1766, Le Tigre, a French merchant brigantine, was en route to New Orleans and wrecked 300 yards (270 m) east of Dog Island in a great storm. A survivor, Monsieur Pierre Viaud, chronicled the experience in the best-selling narrative The Shipwreck and Adventures of Monsieur Pierre Viaud, published 1769 (and translated to English in 1771).

In 1799, the Royal Navy purchased HMS Fox, a 14-gun British schooner, only to see it wreck later that year between Dog and St. George Islands.

=== 19th century ===
As part of the United States, economic shipping greatly increased as St. Marks, St. Joseph, and Apalachicola became major ports on the Gulf Coast. Both sail and steam ships traveled to Dog Island to exploit its resources of lumber and naval stores, such as turpentine and pitch products. In 1838, Dog Island Light was built on the western tip of the island.

During the Civil War, Dog Island was used by the Union Navy as a base for staging the blockade of Apalachicola.

On the first of August 1899, the 2nd hurricane of the season struck the area, almost destroying the town of Carrabelle, leaving just nine homes. Roughly 6 miles inland at McIntyre, only two mill boilers were left. The summer resort of Lanark Inn was said to be "blown into the Gulf". The Carrabelle, Tallahassee and Georgia Railroad was destroyed for a distance of 30 miles, and a locomotive was displaced some 100 yards off the track.

Up to fifteen ships were wrecked (some permanently destroyed), 12 loaded with lumber. Although contemporary documents sometimes have conflicting information as to the names and nationalities of these ships, they are believed to include:

- American ships
  - James A. Garfield, a schooner, under the command of Capt. Cottingham.
  - Mary E. Morse a schooner, under the command of Capt. Densmore.
  - Benjamin C. Cromwell, a schooner under the command of Capt. McClean.
  - Grace Andrews, a schooner under the command of Capt. Brown.
  - Warren Adams, a schooner under the command of Capt. Gibbons
  - Vidette, a barkentine under the command of Capt. Waldren.
  - Capitola, a steamship
  - Iola, a steamship
  - Albert Haley, a fishing smack.

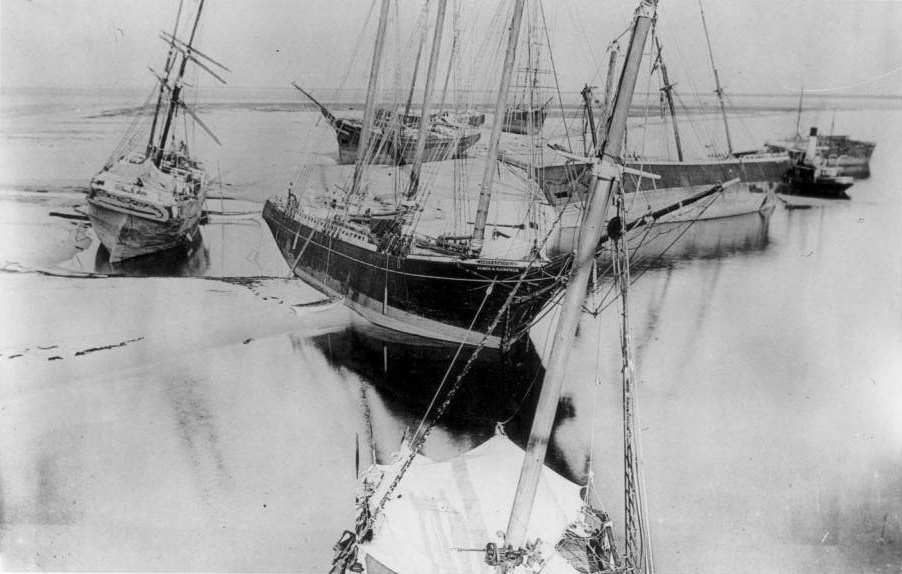
Photo of Dog Island hurricane shipwrecks, 1899

- Norwegian ships
  - Ranavola, bark under the command of Capt. Edwardson.
  - Vale, a bark, under the command of Capt. Andersen (this shipwreck has been identified by archaeologists).
  - Elsbeth, a bark under the command of Capt. Pedersen.
  - Jafnhar, a bark under the command of Capt. Tygensen.
  - Hindoo, a bark under the command of Capt. Madsen.
- Russian ships:
  - Latara, a bark under the command of Capt. Krantman
- Italian ships
  - Corteria, a bark which was split in half

Another 40 ships under 20 tons were sunk or destroyed.

=== 20th century ===
During World War II, Dog Island was part of Camp Gordon Johnston. Four separate camps comprised the complex: three for regimental combat teams, and the fourth for the headquarters and support facilities. Dog Island was used for amphibious landings and airdrops.

An archaeological research project, the Dog Island Shipwreck Survey, was initiated in 1999 by Florida State University researcher Chuck Meide to systematically search the waters off Dog Island, using acoustic and electromagnetic devices, to discover historic shipwrecks. Project archaeologists conducted excavations on the wreck of the 1899 Norwegian lumber ship Vale mentioned above, and also located a number of other submerged archaeological sites, including the ruins of the Dog Island Lighthouse, using sonar and magnetometer.

=== 21st century ===
After Hurricane Michael of 2018, portions of two more shipwrecks likely from the 1899 hurricane wrecking event re-emerged from the sand.
