= Crooked River Light =

Lighthouse in Florida, US

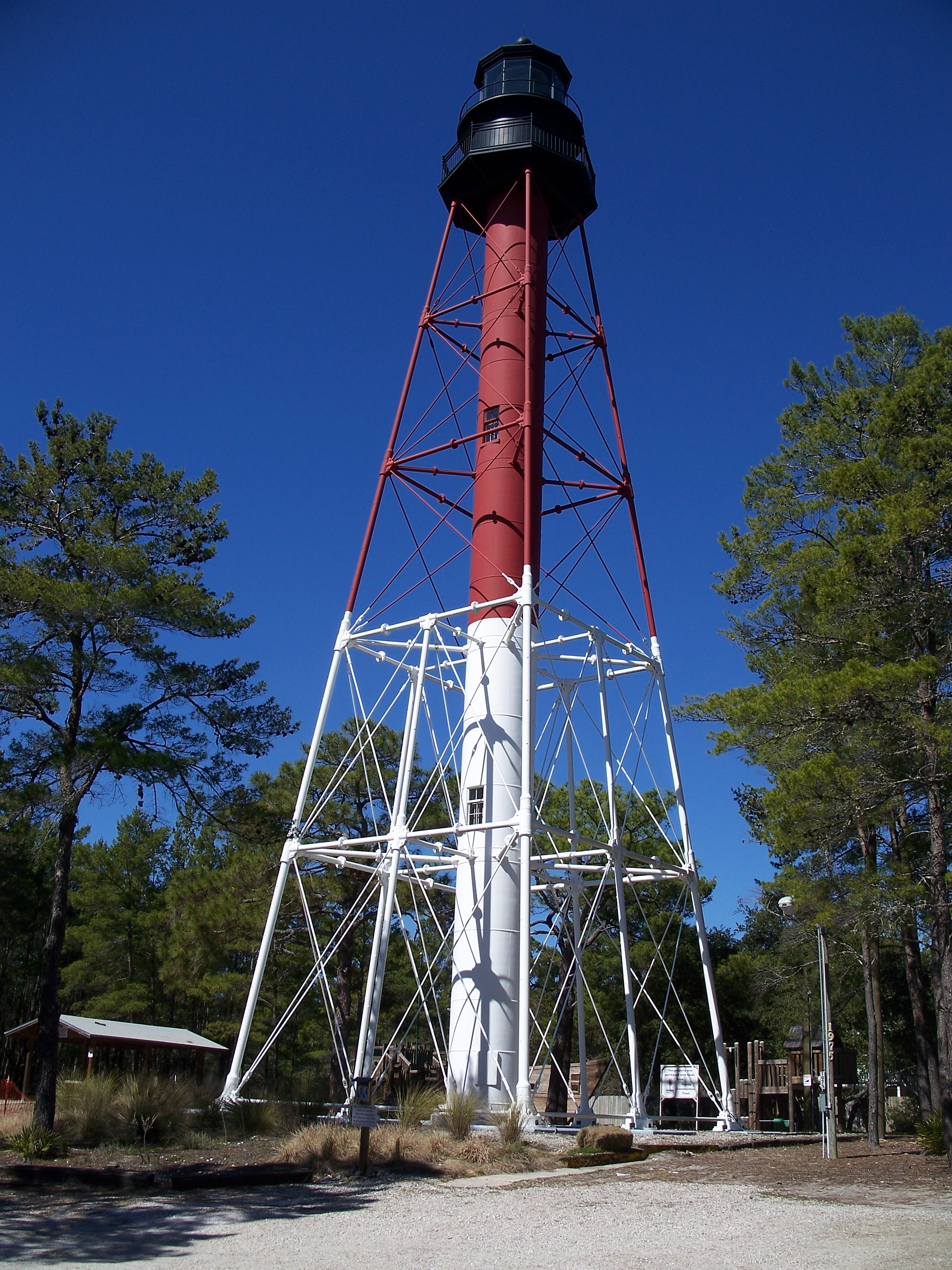
- Location: Carrabelle; Florida; United States
- Coordinates: 29°49′39″N 84°42′04″W

Tower
- Constructed: 1895
- Foundation: concrete base
- Construction: wrought iron skeletal tower
- Automated: 1965
- Height: 100 feet (30 m)
- Shape: square pyramidal skeletal tower with central cylinder, balcony and lantern
- Markings: white lower half tower, red upper half tower, black lantern
- Operator: Carrabelle Lighthouse Association
- Heritage: National Register of Historic Places listed place

Light
- Deactivated: 1995-2007
- Focal height: 115 feet (35 m)
- Lens: fourth order Fresnel lens
- Range: 17 nautical miles (31 km; 20 mi)
- Characteristic: Fl (2) W 15s.
- Crooked River Lighthouse
- U.S. National Register of Historic Places
- Nearest city: Carrabelle, Florida
- Area: less than one acre
- Built: 1895
- NRHP reference No.: 78000941
- Added to NRHP: December 1, 1978

The Crooked River Light, also known as the Carrabelle Light, was built in 1895 to replace the Dog Island Light on Dog Island, which had been destroyed in 1875 by a hurricane. The location on the mainland allowed the light to serve as the rear range light for the channel to the west of Dog Island, used by ships in the lumber trade.

== History ==
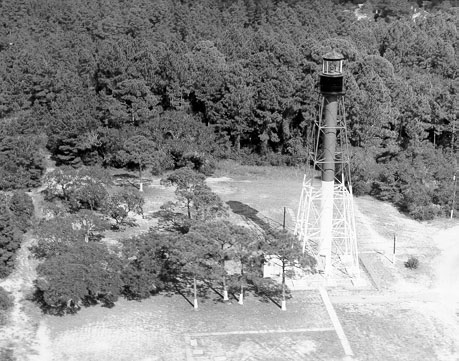
Crooked River Light (by U.S. Coast Guard)

The Crooked River Lighthouse, built in 1895, replaced three lighthouses on Dog Island that over the years were destroyed by storms. The tower was fitted with a 4th Order, bivalve Fresnel lens constructed in Paris, France in 1894. The lightstation grounds originally included a house for both the Keeper and the Assistant Keeper, and several outbuildings. At first the lighthouse was painted solid dark red except for the black lantern room. Later (at the end of 1901) the lower half was painted white to offset it from the surrounding pine forest. This is the same daymark seen on the lighthouse today - the lower half white, the upper half red and a black lantern room. After being electrified in 1933, the lighthouse was automated and unmanned in 1952. In 1964 the two houses and all outbuildings were sold and removed from the site. The original 4th Order lens was removed by the Coast Guard in 1976, due to mercury leakage in the float container. The lens was replaced by a modern optic and this beacon remained in operation until the lighthouse was decommissioned in 1995.

In 1999 the Carrabelle Lighthouse Association was formed to restore, preserve, and open the lighthouse to the public. This goal was achieved between 2007 and 2009. An acrylic replica of the original glass Fresnel lens was installed and the lighthouse serves as an aid to navigation once again. In 2020, the original 4th Order Fresnel lens was returned to the Crooked River Lighthouse and is on display in the Keeper's House Museum.

== Head keepers ==
- James A. Williams (1895 – 1906)
- Albert A. Williams (1906 – 1912)
- Carl Wilson (1913)
- Jefferson D. Miller (1913 – 1918)
- Milton E. Wheelock (1919)
- Thorwald Hansen (at least 1921 – at least 1945)

== See also ==
- List of lighthouses in Florida
- List of lighthouses in the United States
