= Porter's Bar Site =

Archaeological site in Florida, United States

- U.S. National Register of Historic Places
- Location within Florida Location within the United States
- Location: Franklin County, Florida
- Nearest city: Eastpoint
- Coordinates: 29.749°N 84.851°W
- NRHP reference No.: 75000553
- Added to NRHP: January 23, 1975

The Porter's Bar Site is a Pre-Columbian archaeological site in Eastpoint, Florida. It is located two miles northeast of Eastpoint off U.S. 98/319. On January 23, 1975, it was added to the U.S. National Register of Historic Places.
