= Dog Island Light =

Lighthouse in Florida, US

Dog Island Lights
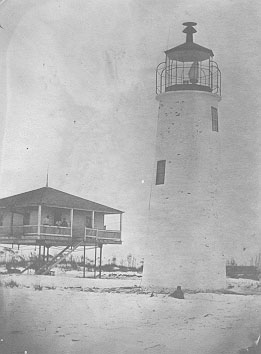
- Location: Dog Island, Florida, United States
- Coordinates: 29°47′N 84°40′W
- Constructed: 1839
- 1839 light
- Construction: brick
- Height: 50 ft (15 m)
- Shape: truncated cone
- First lit: 1839
- Deactivated: 1843
- Lens: 45 lamps w/ 20-in. reflectors
- 1843 light
- Construction: lumber
- Height: 40 ft (12 m)
- Shape: truncated cone
- First lit: 1843
- Deactivated: 1851
- 1851 light
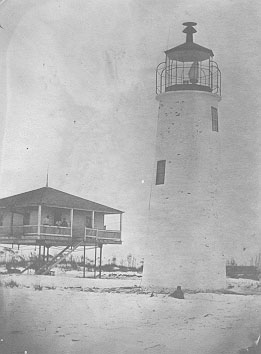
- Construction: brick
- Height: 40 ft (12 m)
- Shape: truncated cone
- First lit: 1851
- Deactivated: 1872
- Lens: fourth order Fresnel lens

Several lighthouses called Dog Island Light were constructed on the western tip of Dog Island south of Carrabelle, Florida. They marked the "middle entrance to St. George's Sound," between St. George and Dog Islands, during the nineteenth century, until its collapse by a hurricane in 1873.

== History ==
The first lighthouse, a 50-foot (15 m) brick tower, was completed in 1839. A storm in 1842 destroyed the keeper's house and badly damaged the lighthouse tower. A 40-foot (12 m) wooden tower was completed in 1843 to replace the brick tower. This second tower was destroyed by a hurricane in 1851. A 40-foot (12 m) brick tower was built in 1851. This is the lighthouse in the photo above. The obsolete lamp and reflector system in the light was replaced by a Forward drop lens in 1856, which was more efficient.

During the Civil War, Confederate forces burned the stairs in the tower and damaged the lens to prevent the tower from being used as a lighthouse or a watchtower. The light was repaired and put back into service after the war. In 1872 beach erosion undermined the tower and caused it to fall. The lantern was salvaged and was moved to the top of the keeper's dwelling. On September 18, 1873 a hurricane destroyed both the tower and the keeper's dwelling.

Congress appropriated funds for a replacement in 1874, but the Lighthouse Board stated, "This light can only serve a local commerce, of which, for several years, there has been little or none; and it is therefore recommended that the new work be indefinitely postponed." The Dog Island Light was never replaced. The Crooked River Light (built near Carrabelle on the mainland in 1895) serves as a leading light for the same channel that was formerly marked by the Dog Island Light.

== Discovery and investigations ==
In 1999, a team of maritime archaeologists led by Chuck Meide, as part of Florida State University's Dog Island Shipwreck Survey, discovered the remains of the Dog Island Lighthouse using side-scan sonar. The submerged brick ruins are now located on the offshore side of the island, as the island itself is slowly migrating towards land and has passed completely over the lighthouse's original position inside the island. The site was re-investigated by Florida State University archaeologists as part of a 2006 summer field school, and various features of the lighthouse—including remains of the keeper's house—were found.

== See also ==
- List of lighthouses in Florida
- List of lighthouses in the United States

== Sources ==
- "Historic Light Station Information and Photography: Florida". United States Coast Guard Historian's Office. Archived from the original on May 1, 2017.
- "Dog Island Light". Lighthouse Depot. March 6, 2006. Archived from the original on October 6, 2007.
- Florida Lighthouse Page - Dog Island Lighthouse History. Retrieved June 29, 2008.
- Meide et al. 2000 Dog Island Shipwreck Survey 1999: Report of Historical and Archaeological Investigations, FSU Program in Underwater Archaeology Research Reports No. 4 (Can be viewed or downloaded as 252 pages in pdf format on Academia.edu)
