= Apalachicola Historic District =

Historic district in Florida, United States

- U.S. National Register of Historic Places
- U.S. Historic district
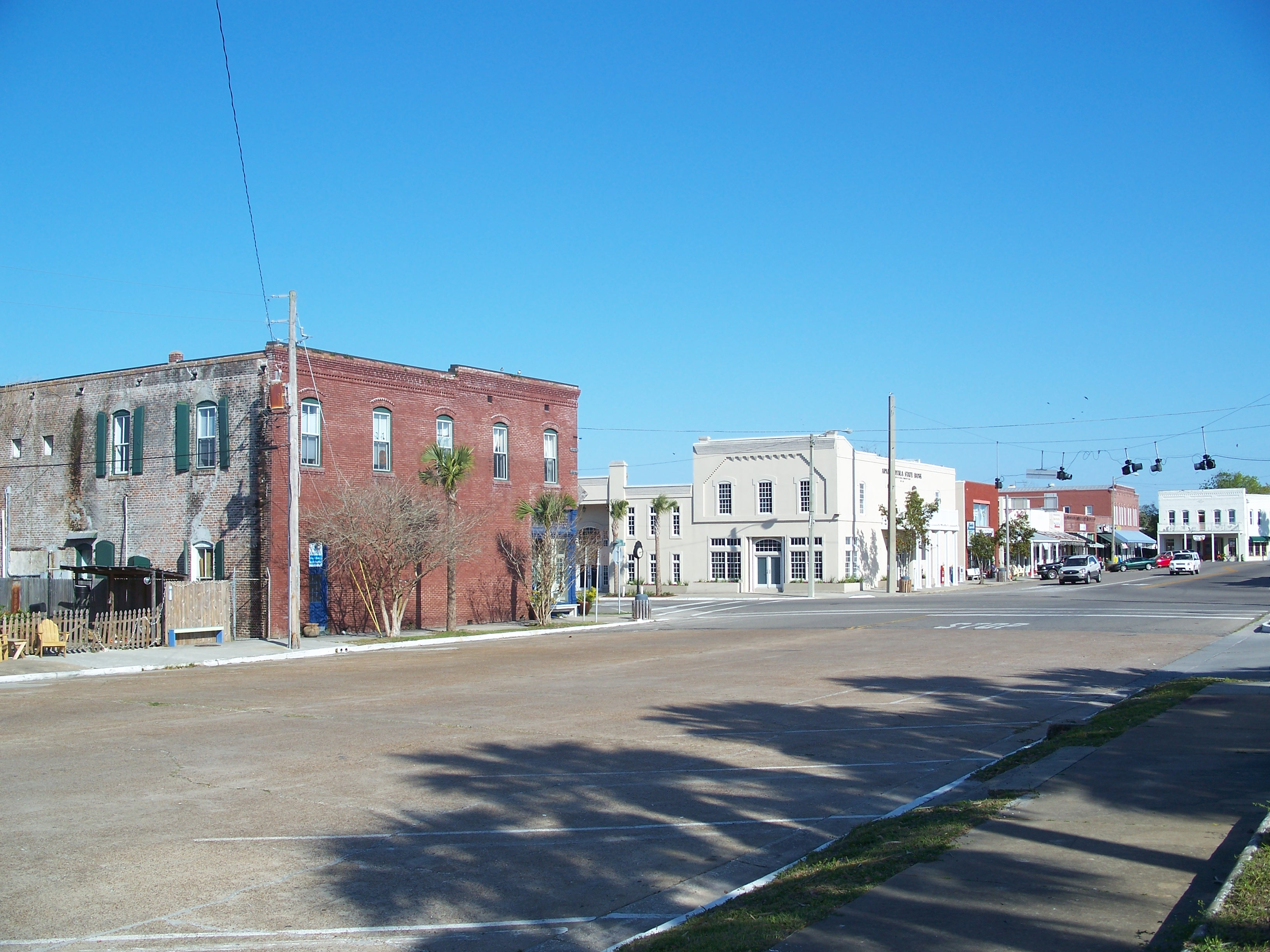
- Looking southeast down Market Street towards US 98

- Location within Florida Location within the United States
- Location: Apalachicola, Florida
- Coordinates: 29°43′42″N 84°59′31″W
- Area: 460 acres (190 ha)
- Built: 1836
- Architectural style: Mid 19th Century Revival, Late 19th And 20th Century Revivals, Late Victorian
- NRHP reference No.: 80000951
- Added to NRHP: November 21, 1980

The Apalachicola Historic District is a U.S. historic district in Apalachicola, Florida. It is bounded by the Apalachicola River, Apalachicola Bay, 17th and Jefferson Streets, encompasses approximately 4600 acres (19 km^{2}), and contains 652 historic buildings. On November 21, 1980, it was added to the U.S. National Register of Historic Places.
