= Pierce Site =

Archaeological site in Florida, United States

- U.S. National Register of Historic Places
- Location within Florida Location within the United States
- Location: Apalachicola, Florida
- Coordinates: 29.73°N 85.01°W
- NRHP reference No.: 74000624
- Added to NRHP: January 11, 1974

The Pierce Site (also known as Pierce Mounds and Middens and 8FR14, and other numbers) is a Pre-Columbian archaeological site in Apalachicola, Florida. It is located approximately 1 mile northwest of Apalachicola on 12th Street. On January 11, 1974, it was added to the U.S. National Register of Historic Places. It was occupied during the Middle Woodland Period, which includes ceramics of early Weeden Island and Swift Creek types. It also was occupied during the late prehistoric Fort Walton Period.
