= St. Teresa, Florida =

- Unincorporated community
- Location within Florida
- Coordinates: 29°55′51″N 84°27′15″W
- Country: United States
- State: Florida
- County: Franklin
- Elevation: 20 ft (6.1 m)
- Time zone: UTC-5 (Eastern (EST))
  - Summer (DST): UTC-4 (EDT)
- Area code: 850
- GNIS feature ID: 308409

St. Teresa is an unincorporated community in Franklin County, Florida, United States. It is located along U.S. Route 98, on St. James Island and the Gulf of Mexico. It is home to Florida State University's Coastal and Marine Laboratory, an oceanic research facility established in 1949.
