= List of shipwrecks in 1899 =

The list of shipwrecks in 1899 includes ships sunk, foundered, grounded, or otherwise lost during 1899.

table of contents
1899
Jan	Feb	Mar	Apr
May	Jun	Jul	Aug
Sep	Oct	Nov	Dec
Unknown date

== January ==
=== 1 January ===
List of shipwrecks: 1 January 1899
Ship	State	Description
Harry	United States	The steam barge was sunk by ice in Chesapeake Bay off Pools Island.
Protection	United States	The freighter sank in a heavy gale off the mouth of the Columbia River. Survivors rescued by Colgate (United Kingdom). One crewman died.

=== 5 January ===
List of shipwrecks: 5 January 1899
Ship	State	Description
Alex Yost	United States	The steamer hit a snag on Middle Creek Bar in the Big Sandy River and sank, later breaking up. Her machinery was later salvaged.

=== 6 January ===
List of shipwrecks: 6 January 1899
Ship	State	Description
Genivieve	United States	The steamer sprang a leak and sank in the Great Kanawha River at Deep Water, West Virginia, later raised and repaired.

=== 9 January ===
List of shipwrecks: 9 January 1899
Ship	State	Description
Annie May	United States	The sloop was wrecked when she broke loose from her moorings in Cross Island, Maine by heavy seas and high wind. After the storm she was stripped.

=== 12 January ===
List of shipwrecks: 12 January 1899
Ship	State	Description
Forest Hall	United Kingdom	The barque got in trouble off Porlock, Somerset, England. The Lynmouth Lifeboat Station answered her distress call by taking the lifeboat Louisa ( Royal National Lifeboat Institution), pulled by horses and people, overland for 15 miles (24 km) to go to her rescue, climbing 1,423 feet (434 m) during the journey.
Startle	United States	The sloop ran aground in dense fog near Wood End. Refloated on 22 January.

=== 13 January ===
List of shipwrecks: 13 January 1899
Ship	State	Description
Jewel	United States	The ferry was wrecked on rocks near Caspar, California. One crewman died.

=== 14 January ===
List of shipwrecks: 14 January 1899
Ship	State	Description
Andelana	United Kingdom	A photograph of most of the crew of Andelana taken on her deck at Tacoma, Washington, on 14 January 1899. She sank later the same day with the loss of all the men in the photograph. The four-masted barque, newly arrived from China, capsized during a storm in Commencement Bay in Tacoma, Washington. Seventeen of the crew and her officers were lost.
Edith M. McInnis	United States	The fishing schooner went ashore in fog near the Cape Sable Island Lighthouse. Her crew were rescued.

=== 16 January ===
List of shipwrecks: 16 January 1899
Ship	State	Description
Bristow	United Kingdom	The composite barquentine, from Sunderland for Dover with coal, was badly damaged in collision with steamer Glenlochy (United Kingdom). She was towed into Ramsgate, and arrived at IJmuiden on 24 February to be broken up.
Neches Belle	United States	The laid up steamer sank in the Sabine River at Logansport, Louisiana.

=== 17 January ===
List of shipwrecks: 17 January 1899
Ship	State	Description
R. C. Gunter	United States	The laid up steamer was sunk by ice at Kampsville, Illinois. Raised later.

=== 19 January ===
List of shipwrecks: 19 January 1899
Ship	State	Description
Ouachita	United States	The steamer burned and sank at Memphis, Tennessee. Three passengers died.

=== 22 January ===
List of shipwrecks: 22 January 1899
Ship	State	Description
William D.	United States	The launch was sunk in a collision with the ferry Oakland (United States) in San Francisco Bay. Two passengers died.

=== 24 January ===
List of shipwrecks: 24 January 1899
Ship	State	Description
M. M. Davis	United States	The bugeye sank in a collision with Gov. Robt. M. McLane (United States) at the entrance to the harbor of Cambridge, Maryland.
Santiago	United States	The steamer was wrecked at Brazos Santiago.

=== 25 January ===
List of shipwrecks: 25 January 1899
Ship	State	Description
Tycoon	United States	The steamer burned and sank at Newport, Arkansas.

=== 26 January ===
List of shipwrecks: 26 January 1899
Ship	State	Description
Jessie Wilson	United States	The steamer sprang a leak and sank at Shawneetown, Illinois. Raised and repaired.
Royal Pierce	United States	The steamer sprang a leak and sank at Pond River.

=== 29 January ===
List of shipwrecks: 29 January 1899
Ship	State	Description
Cathie C. Berry	United States	The schooner sprung a leak and was abandoned by her crew while going from Edgartown, Massachusetts to Boston and was wrecked when she went ashore one-half mile (0.80 km) from the Peaked Hill, Massachusetts Life-saving Station. She was stripped and abandoned. Total loss.

=== 31 January ===
List of shipwrecks: 31 January 1899
Ship	State	Description
Fannie Flint	United States	The schooner fowled the anchored William M. Bird (United States) and sprung a leak when the seas slapped her against the larger vessel's hull. She got clear and anchored, but her pumps could not keep up and she sank in the area of Monomoy Island. Crew transferred by boat to William M. Bird.
James Baird	United States	The schooner ran aground during a storm and foundered on Santa Rosa Island, Florida, 29 miles (47 km) east of the entrance to Pensacola Bay.
Rhynland	Belgium	The ocean liner ran aground on Fenwick Island. Refloated on 4 February.

=== Unknown date ===
List of shipwrecks: Unknown date January 1899
Ship	State	Description
Voorwaarts	Italy	The steamship was wrecked at Morwenstow, Cornwall, United Kingdom.

== February ==
=== 4 February ===
List of shipwrecks: 4 February 1899
Ship	State	Description
Katherine Francesco	United States	The steamer sank due to a leaking gasket at New York City. Raised the next day.
Mary Hannah	United Kingdom	A Penzance schooner on passage from Cardiff to Plymouth with a cargo of coal. Disabled after the main boom was damaged in a huge sea and gale off the Lizard, she headed for Newlyn but was unable to enter the harbour and ran ashore at Tolcarne. All four crew were rescued by breeches-buoy.

=== 8 February ===
List of shipwrecks: 8 February 1899
Ship	State	Description
George E. Dudley	United States	The schooner stranded in a gale and snowstorm six miles (9.7 km) south of the Cobb Island, Virginia life-saving station off New Inlet. Refloated on 28 February.
Robert A. Snow	United States	The 225-foot (68.6 m), 1,556-gross register ton schooner lost her tow in a snowstorm and was stranded in heavy seas near Rockaway, Queens, New York, and sank in 23 feet (7 m) of water. The United States Life-Saving Service rescued her crew from her rigging. She was declared a total loss.
William Lawrence	United States	The steamer foundered on the bar off Hunting Island, South Carolina in a storm.

=== 9 February ===
List of shipwrecks: 9 February 1899
Ship	State	Description
F. J. O'Connell	United States	The steamer was sunk by ice at Evansville, Indiana.
Fred Wilson	United States	The steamer was sunk by ice at Hall's Wood Yard in the Ohio River. Raised and repaired.
Resistance	United Kingdom	The decommissioned broadside ironclad, under tow from Spithead to Mersey shipbreakers, was diverted to Holyhead, Wales as leaking after gale. She was put ashore to prevent foundering and, after repair, refloated on 17 February and towed to her destination.

=== 10 February ===
List of shipwrecks: 10 February 1899
Ship	State	Description
Annie M. Reynolds	United States	The schooner sank in a violent snowstorm off the Metomkin Inlet, Virginia life saving station where she had been anchored after damage in a series of storms since the 10th. Crew rescued by United States Life-Saving Service. Total loss.
Brazil	United Kingdom	The barkentine stranded two miles (3.2 km) west of the Moriches, New York life saving station in a snowstorm. Crew rescued by United States Life-Saving Service. The vessel broke up in another snowstorm on 12 or 13 February, and declared a total loss.
Maggie Etter	United States	The schooner stranded two miles (3.2 km) north west of the Gull Shoal, North Carolina life saving station after being carried out of the harbor at Rodanthe, North Carolina by ice flows. She was refloated by the United States Life-Saving Service on 21 February.

=== 12 February ===
List of shipwrecks: 12 February 1899
Ship	State	Description
E. L. Dow	United States	The schooner was stranded by drift ice one and a half miles (2.4 km) southeast of the Coskata, Massachusetts lifesaving station during a thick snowstorm. The crew were rescued by the United States Life-Saving Service. She broke up on 16 February, a total loss.
Novelty	United States	The steamer burned at Vicksburg, Mississippi.

=== 13 February ===
List of shipwrecks: 13 February 1899
Ship	State	Description
Germanic	United Kingdom	The ocean liner sank at New York, United States. Subsequently refloated, repaired and returned to service
Jas. A. Carney	United States	The steamer was sunk by ice in Mobile Bay. Raised and repaired.
Ralph	United States	The steamer was sunk by ice at Memphis, Tennessee. Raised and repaired.
Winnegance	United States	The schooner was stranded in a north east gale one and three-quarters miles (2.8 km) east of the Muskeget Island life saving station. The crew were rescued by the United States Life-Saving Service. Refloated on 4 March.

=== 14 February ===
List of shipwrecks: 14 February 1899
Ship	State	Description
Charlie McDonald	United States	The steamer was sunk by ice in the Ohio River near White House, Kentucky.
John V. Morgan	United States	The steamer sprung a leak and sank while in ice near Muskegon, Michigan.
St. George	United States	The schooner sunk in shallow water by ice eight miles (13 km) north north west of the Sabine Pass life saving station. Crew boarded a nearby schooner. She was pumped out and refloated by the United States Life-Saving Service on 16 February.

=== 15 February ===
List of shipwrecks: 15 February 1899
Ship	State	Description
Addie M. Anderson	United States	Carrying a cargo of coal, the 184-foot (56 m), 934-gross register ton four-masted schooner sank in 50 feet (15 m) of water off Rhode Island in the West Passage of Narragansett Bay 0.5 nautical miles (0.9 km; 0.6 mi) northeast of Whale Rock at 41°27.02′N 71°24.76′W after striking a submerged wreck.
Demozelle	United Kingdom	The schooner was stranded on a shoal off Tuckernuck Island off Nantucket, Massachusetts. She was refloated on 28 February.
Sarah	United States	The fishing schooner was lost in a gale on the Banks. Her crew were rescued by Schooner Mabel Leighton.

=== 18 February ===
List of shipwrecks: 18 February 1899
Ship	State	Description
Captain Cook	United Kingdom	The steamship was wrecked at Clogher Head, County Louth. She was on a voyage from Glasgow, Renfrewshire to Drogheda, County Louth.
Fair Play	United States	The steamer was sunk by ice in the Big Sandy River at White House, Kentucky.

=== 21 February ===
List of shipwrecks: 21 February 1899
Ship	State	Description
Huston Combs No.2	United States	The steamer sank between New Iberia and Morgan City, Louisiana when Hogchains failed. Three crewmen died.
Mark Winnett	United States	The laid up steamer was sunk by ice at Marmet's Coal Harbor.

=== 22 February ===
List of shipwrecks: 22 February 1899
Ship	State	Description
Island Queen	United States	The ferry sprang a leak and sank at New Harmony, Indiana.

=== 23 February ===
List of shipwrecks: 23 February 1899
Ship	State	Description
U and I	United States	The steamer burned on the Red River near Coushatta, Louisiana.

=== 24 February ===
List of shipwrecks: 24 February 1899
Ship	State	Description
John S. Ames	United States	The schooner stranded on Galveston Island 15 miles (24 km) south south west of the Galveston, Texas life saving station in thick weather. Her captain, his wife, and the crew were rescued by the United States Life-Saving Service. Broke up the next day, a total loss.
Unknown	United States	The naptha launch broke loose from her moorings and was wrecked on Point Diablo breaking up. Her engine was salvaged by the United States Life-Saving Service. A total loss.

=== 25 February ===
List of shipwrecks: 25 February 1899
Ship	State	Description
Anna	United States	The steamer burned at Wilmington, North Carolina.
State of Texas	United States	The steamer was damaged by ice in the Chesapeake Bay and beached on Guinns Island, Virginia. Later refloated and repaired.

=== 27 February ===
List of shipwrecks: 27 February 1899
Ship	State	Description
May McFarland	United States	The schooner stranded at Long Beach, New York one mile (1.6 km) west of the lifesaving station in a gale. Her crew were rescued by the United States Life-Saving Service. Total loss.
Starbuck	United States	The steamer struck a rock and was beached near Conseguina Point, Nicaragua.

=== Unknown date ===
List of shipwrecks: unknown February 1899
Ship	State	Description
A. M. Burnham	United States	The fishing schooner sailed from Gloucester, Massachusetts 21 January and was probably lost in a gale on the Georges Bank on 14 February. All 12 crew died.
Maggie Murtagh	United States	The towboat foundered between dusk on 10 February and dawn on 11 February at the foot of Bush Street, Brooklyn, New York. Later raised.

== March ==
=== 1 March ===
List of shipwrecks: 1 March 1899
Ship	State	Description
Labrador	United Kingdom	The passenger ship was wrecked on Skerryvore. All on board survived. She was on a voyage from Saint John, New Brunswick, to Liverpool, Lancashire.
R. S. Van Meter	United States	The steamer burned at Quincy, Illinois.

=== 4 March ===
List of shipwrecks: 4 March 1899
Ship	State	Description
Ada	Australia	Cyclone Mahina: The fishing schooner/pearling lugger was lost off Cape Melville.
Adi Alum	Australia	Cyclone Mahina: The fishing schooner/pearling lugger was lost off Cape Melville.
Admiral	Australia	Cyclone Mahina: The fishing schooner/pearling lugger was lost off Cape Melville.
Aladdin	Australia	Cyclone Mahina: The fishing schooner/pearling lugger dragged anchor and went ashore. Apparently refloated.
Carrie	Australia	Cyclone Mahina: The fishing schooner/pearling lugger was lost off Cape Melville.
Channel Rock Lightship	Australia	Cyclone Mahina: The lightship was lost off the Channel Rocks, Cape Grenville. Lost with all four hands, or all hands including her four officers.
Charmer	United States	The schooner stranded on the Ocracoke Inlet bar in fog. Her crew were rescued by the United States Life-Saving Service. She broke up, a total loss.
Clara Merriman	Australia	Cyclone Mahina: The fishing schooner/pearling lugger was lost off Cape Melville.
Crest of the waves	Australia	Cyclone Mahina: The fishing schooner either survived the storm without going ashore or was beached to prevent sinking after the storm passed Cape Melville.
Daisy	Australia	Cyclone Mahina: The fishing schooner/pearling lugger was lost off Cape Melville.
Dudley	Australia	Cyclone Mahina: The Queensland Marine Department supply vessel disappeared during the storm in the Torres Strait area. Lost with all four hands.
Eileen	Australia	Cyclone Mahina: The fishing schooner/pearling lugger was lost off Cape Melville.
Endeavour	Australia	Cyclone Mahina: The fishing schooner/pearling lugger was lost off Cape Melville.
Endymion	Australia	Cyclone Mahina: The fishing schooner/pearling lugger was lost off Cape Melville.
Estelle	Australia	Cyclone Mahina: The fishing schooner/pearling lugger was lost off Cape Melville.
Fiji	Australia	Cyclone Mahina: The fishing schooner/pearling lugger was lost off Cape Melville.
Francis	Australia	Cyclone Mahina: The fishing schooner/pearling lugger was lost off Cape Melville.
Gipsy	Australia	Cyclone Mahina: The fishing schooner/pearling lugger was lost off Cape Melville.
Gitana	Australia	Cyclone Mahina: The fishing schooner/pearling lugger was lost off Cape Melville.
Guarra Peres	Australia	Cyclone Mahina: The fishing schooner/pearling lugger was lost off Cape Melville.
Hime	Australia	Cyclone Mahina: The fishing schooner/pearling lugger was lost off Cape Melville.
Jennie	Australia	Cyclone Mahina: The fishing schooner/pearling lugger was lost off Cape Melville.
Jessamine	Australia	Cyclone Mahina: The fishing schooner/pearling lugger was lost off Cape Melville.
Joseph	Australia	Cyclone Mahina: The fishing schooner/pearling lugger was lost off Cape Melville.
Kate	Australia	Cyclone Mahina: The fishing schooner/pearling lugger was lost off Cape Melville.
Kathleen	Australia	Cyclone Mahina: The fishing schooner/pearling lugger was lost off Cape Melville.
Kirkham	Australia	Cyclone Mahina: The fishing schooner/pearling lugger was lost off Cape Melville.
Kotohira	Australia	Cyclone Mahina: The fishing schooner/pearling lugger was lost off Cape Melville.
Eileen	Australia	Cyclone Mahina: The fishing schooner/pearling lugger was lost off Cape Melville.
Leopold	Australia	Cyclone Mahina: The fishing schooner/pearling lugger was lost off Cape Melville.
Little Bell	Australia	Cyclone Mahina: The fishing schooner/pearling lugger was lost off Cape Melville.
Lucia	Australia	Cyclone Mahina: The fishing schooner/pearling lugger was lost off Cape Melville.
Maggie	Australia	Cyclone Mahina: The fishing schooner/pearling lugger was lost off Cape Melville.
Martha	Australia	Cyclone Mahina: The fishing schooner/pearling lugger was lost off Cape Melville.
Maygalle	Australia	Cyclone Mahina: The fishing schooner/pearling lugger was lost off Cape Melville.
Meg Merrilees	Australia	Cyclone Mahina: The schooner stranded during the storm, Princess Charlotte Bay area.
Molyneaux	Australia	Cyclone Mahina: The fishing schooner/pearling lugger was lost off Cape Melville.
Nancy	Australia	Cyclone Mahina: The fishing schooner/pearling lugger was lost off Cape Melville.
Narellan	Australia	Cyclone Mahina: The fishing schooner/pearling lugger was lost off Cape Melville.
North Star	Australia	Cyclone Mahina: The fishing schooner/pearling lugger was lost off Cape Melville.
North Wales	Australia	Cyclone Mahina: The fishing schooner/pearling lugger was lost off Cape York.
Ocean Bride	Australia	Cyclone Mahina: The fishing schooner/pearling lugger was lost off Cape Melville.
Pacific	Australia	Cyclone Mahina: The fishing schooner/pearling lugger was lost off Cape Melville.
Paleatea	Australia	Cyclone Mahina: The fishing schooner/pearling lugger was lost off Cape Melville.
Pearl King	Australia	Cyclone Mahina: The fishing schooner/pearling lugger was lost off Cape Melville.
Pearl Queen	Australia	Cyclone Mahina: The fishing schooner/pearling lugger was lost off Cape Melville.
Pegasus	Australia	Cyclone Mahina: The fishing schooner/pearling lugger was lost off Cape Melville.
Pert	Australia	Cyclone Mahina: The fishing schooner/pearling lugger was lost off Cape Melville.
Pirate	Australia	Cyclone Mahina: The fishing schooner/pearling lugger was lost off Cape Melville.
Rosa	Australia	Cyclone Mahina: The fishing schooner/pearling lugger was lost off Cape York Peninsula.
Sagitta	Australia	Cyclone Mahina: The fishing schooner/pearling lugger was lost off Cape Melville. Lost with all crewmen, either 11 or 20, one female crewmember survived.
Silvery Wave	Australia	Cyclone Mahina: The fishing schooner foundered off Cape Melville. 23 crewmen died, one crewman survived.
Sprig	Australia	Cyclone Mahina: The fishing schooner/pearling lugger was lost off Cape Melville.
Sun	Australia	Cyclone Mahina: The fishing schooner/pearling lugger was lost off Cape Melville.
Tarawa	Australia	Cyclone Mahina: The fishing schooner dragged anchor and was wrecked, but later refloated.
Two Brothers	Australia	Cyclone Mahina: The fishing schooner/pearling lugger was lost off Cape York Peninsula.
Vailele	Australia	Cyclone Mahina: The fishing schooner/pearling lugger was lost off Cape Melville.
Vera	Australia	Cyclone Mahina: The fishing schooner/pearling lugger was lost off Cape Melville.
Vision	Australia	Cyclone Mahina: The fishing schooner/pearling lugger was lost off Cape Melville.
Wai Weer	Australia	Cyclone Mahina: The fishing schooner/pearling lugger dragged anchor and was wrecked, but later refloated.
Xarifa	Australia	Cyclone Mahina: The fishing schooner/pearling lugger was lost off Cape York Peninsula.
Yamotu	Australia	Cyclone Mahina: The fishing schooner/pearling lugger was lost off Cape Melville.
Zanoni	Australia	Cyclone Mahina: The fishing schooner/pearling lugger was washed ashore on Cape Melville near Boulder Rocks Reef and wrecked.
Zypher	Australia	Cyclone Mahina: The fishing schooner/pearling lugger was washed ashore on Cape Melville. Refloated eight weeks later.
Zoe	Australia	Cyclone Mahina: The fishing schooner/pearling lugger was lost off Cape Melville.

=== 5 March ===
List of shipwrecks: 5 March 1899
Ship	State	Description
H. W. Buttorff	United States	The steamer was damaged in a severe thunderstorm and sank in shallow water when blown into the Louisville and Nashville Railroad bridge at Clarksville, Tennessee. Raised and repaired.
Tamesi	United States	The steamer was wrecked on William's Shoal, Wallops Beach, Virginia in thick weather. Her crew were rescued by the United States Life-Saving Service. A total loss.

=== 7 March ===
List of shipwrecks: 7 March 1899
Ship	State	Description
Alfred Brabrook	United States	The schooner went ashore in a Gale two miles (3.2 km) north north east of the Gull Shoal, North Carolina Life Saving Station. Crew rescued by the United States Life-Saving Service. Total loss
Belle	United States	The sloop went ashore in a snowstorm abreast the Chincoteague Lighthouse. Refloated on 21 March.
G. P. Keagle	United States	The 42-gross register ton schooner was lost when she collided with an unidentified vessel at Hampton Roads, Virginia. All three people on board survived.
Henrietta	United States	The schooner dragged anchor and went ashore in a gale three-quarters mile (1.2 km) west of the Big Kinnakeet, North Carolina Life Saving Station. Refloated on 10 March by the United States Life-Saving Service.
Homer D. Alverson	United States	The schooner lost her tow off Lone Hill, New York, drifting ashore in thick weather. Her crew abandoned her on 27 March. A total loss.
James Bowen	United States	The steamer foundered off Hog Island, Virginia. Reported lost with all ten hands.
Mascot	United States	The sloop went ashore in a snowstorm 1 1/4 miles (2.0 km) south south east of the Assateague Life saving station. Crew taken off by the United States Life-Saving Service. Refloated on 8 March.
William B. Steelman	United States	The schooner went ashore in fog and thick weather two miles (3.2 km) north north east of the Lewes, Delaware Life Saving Station. Her crew transferred to a nearby hospital ship. Her wreck was sold.
Willie T.	United States	The schooner dragged anchor and went ashore in a gale three-quarters mile (1.2 km) west of the Big Kinnakeet, North Carolina Life Saving Station. Refloated on 18 March by the United States Life-Saving Service.

=== 12 March ===
List of shipwrecks: 12 March 1899
Ship	State	Description
Castilian	United Kingdom	The cargo liner ran aground on the Gannet Dry Ledge and was wrecked. All on board were rescued. She was on the return leg of her maiden voyage, from Portland, Maine, United States to Liverpool, Lancashire.

=== 16 March ===
List of shipwrecks: 16 March 1899
Ship	State	Description
Cygnet	United States	In a gale the laid up steamer got hung up on her wharf, tipped and sank after flooding at New Bedford, Massachusetts. Later raised.
A. J. Poole	United States	The towboat foundered off Red Hook, Brooklyn when a schooner she was towing put on sail with out cutting the tow line causing the towboat to sink in 12 feet (3.7 m) of water. Raised on 19 March.
Mary Lewis	United States	The towboat foundered off 42nd Street, South Brooklyn, New York when swamped by following seas. Raised the next day.

=== 21 March ===
List of shipwrecks: 21 March 1899
Ship	State	Description
C. D. Owens	United States	The steamer burned at a wharf in the Chatahoochie River at Columbus, Georgia.
Flint	United States	The steamer burned at a wharf in the Chatahoochie River at Columbus, Georgia as a result of C. D. Owens burning.
Hannah Sullivan	United States	The steamer was sunk by a stopcock that was left open at Port Washington, Wisconsin. Raised and repaired.

=== 26 March ===
List of shipwrecks: 26 March 1899
Ship	State	Description
Science	United Kingdom	The steamer collided with the steamer Daybreak (United Kingdom) north of Cape St Vincent, Portugal and sank.

=== 28 March ===
List of shipwrecks: 28 March 1899
Ship	State	Description
Gertrude	United States	The steamer was sunk by a log raft at Catlettsburg, Kentucky.

=== 29 March ===
List of shipwrecks: 29 March 1899
Ship	State	Description
Rowena Lee	United States	The steamer struck an obstruction and was sunk at Tyler, Missouri.

=== 30 March ===
List of shipwrecks: 30 March 1899
Ship	State	Description
Arthur D. Story	United States	The fishing schooner was wrecked on the coast of Newfoundland.
Stella	United Kingdom	The passenger ferry sank off the Casquets, Channel Islands with the loss of 78 lives.

== April ==
=== 1 April ===
List of shipwrecks: 1 April 1899
Ship	State	Description
Foam	United States	The 6-ton, 30.6-foot (9.3 m) schooner was beached on either Nakchamik Island (56°20′N 157°49′W) or Shanachu Island off the south coast of the District of Alaska's Alaska Peninsula after she sprang a leak during a gale. The only person aboard survived, but she became a total loss.

=== 4 April ===
List of shipwrecks: 4 April 1899
Ship	State	Description
Chilkat	United States	The steamer capsized and broke up trying to cross the Humboldt Bay Bar. 11 crewmen died; 6 survivors were rescued by North Fork (United States), and 2 crewmen and 1 passenger made it to shore on their own.

=== 6 April ===
List of shipwrecks: 6 April 1899
Ship	State	Description
Eillen	United States	The steamer struck a snag in the Mississippi River and sank at Stag Island, Missouri near Sterling, Missouri. Raised 17 April.

=== 7 April ===
List of shipwrecks: 7 April 1899
Ship	State	Description
Kanawha	United States	The steamer sank from leaks after entering a hurricane on 4 April, location unspecified. Survivors were rescued by the brig Atalanta and landed at San Juan, Puerto Rico.

=== 8 April ===
List of shipwrecks: 8 April 1899
Ship	State	Description
J. C. McNaughton	United States	The schooner parted her cable, stranded and sank one-half mile (0.80 km) east of the Durants, North Carolina Life Saving Station. The crew rescued by the United States Life-Saving Service. $800 of her cargo of lumber was salvaged. A total loss.

=== 9 April ===
List of shipwrecks: 9 April 1899
Ship	State	Description
John K. Speed	United States	The steamer struck the guide wall of a canal and sank in eight feet (2.4 m) of water at Louisville, Kentucky. 101 passengers and crew rescued by the United States Life-Saving Service. Raised and repaired.

=== 10 April ===
List of shipwrecks: 10 April 1899
Ship	State	Description
Salem	United States	The tow steamer struck a ledge and sank in White Head Passage in Portland Harbor, Maine.

=== 16 April ===
List of shipwrecks: 16 April 1899
Ship	State	Description
Eva	United States	The steamer burned on the Chefunete River at Madisonville, Louisiana.

=== 18 April ===
List of shipwrecks: 18 April 1899
Ship	State	Description
Eliza	United States	The fishing schooner was lost on Rose and Crown shoal. 12 crewmen died.

=== 21 April ===
List of shipwrecks: 21 April 1899
Ship	State	Description
General Whitney	United States	The steamer sank from leaks in the Atlantic Ocean (28°40′N 79°39′W). 19 crewmen survived, 12 drowned, including her captain, when one lifeboat capsized off New Smyrna, Florida.
Mystery	United States	The schooner stranded on St. Joseph Island 13 miles (21 km) north east of the Port Aransas, Texas Life Saving Station. Her master made it to shore, the mate, the only other crew member, drowned in the attempt. Started to break up during a salvage attempt two days later and was abandoned, a total loss.

=== 23 April ===
List of shipwrecks: 23 April 1899
Ship	State	Description
City of Kingston	United States	The steamer was sunk in a collision with Glenogle (United States) near Tacoma, Washington.

=== 24 April ===
List of shipwrecks: 24 April 1899
Ship	State	Description
Loch Sloy	United Kingdom	The three-masted barque sank off Kangaroo Island, South Australia.

=== 25 April ===
List of shipwrecks: 25 April 1899
Ship	State	Description
Dick Clyde	United States	The steamer sprung a leak and sank at Kuttawa, Kentucky.

=== 27 April ===
List of shipwrecks: 27 April 1899
Ship	State	Description
Chamberlain	United States	The vessel burned two miles (3.2 km) below Chamberlain, South Dakota.

=== 29 April ===
List of shipwrecks: 29 April 1899
Ship	State	Description
Alarm	United States	The steamer struck an obstruction and sank at Gretna, Louisiana. Later raised.

=== Unknown date ===
List of shipwrecks: Unknown April 1899
Ship	State	Description
Nellie M. Davis	United States	The fishing schooner foundered on the Grand Banks on 6 or 14 April. One crewman died; survivors were rescued by the schooner Eleanora.

== May ==
=== 1 May ===
List of shipwrecks: 1 May 1899
Ship	State	Description
John Taylor	United States	The ferry burned at Burlington, Iowa.

=== 3 May ===
List of shipwrecks: 3 May 1899
Ship	State	Description
Hendricks	United States	The cat boat capsized and sank in shallow water one-quarter mile (0.40 km) south east of the Short Beach Life Saving Station. The United States Life-Saving Service rescued the two men that had been on board, and dragged the boat on shore and bailed it out.
Robert Byron	United States	The schooner stranded close to the Race Point Life Saving Station and partially sank, she then caught fire and partially burned. Crew rescued by the United States Life-Saving Service. Wreck sold for $25.

=== 4 May ===
List of shipwrecks: 4 May 1899
Ship	State	Description
W. A. Williams	United States	The steamer was flooded by the wake of a passing vessel and sank at her dock in New Orleans, Louisiana.

=== 5 May ===
List of shipwrecks: 5 May 1899
Ship	State	Description
Hiram lowell	United States	The fishing schooner was wrecked in the Magdalen Islands.

=== 7 May ===
List of shipwrecks: 7 May 1899
Ship	State	Description
Fred Jansen	United States	The laid up tow steamer foundered at her dock at Wilmington, Delaware. Pumped out the next day.

=== 11 May ===
List of shipwrecks: 11 May 1899
Ship	State	Description
Thomas Davidson	United States	The steamer stranded on Cana Island, Lake Michigan, seven miles (11 km) east north east of the Baileys Harbor, Wisconsin Life Saving Station. Refloated on 20 May.

=== 13 May ===
List of shipwrecks: 13 May 1899
Ship	State	Description
Nelson	United States	The schooner foundered in a fierce gale in Lake Superior eighteen miles (29 km) west north west of the Muskallonge Lake Life Saving Station. Her master survived, but his infant son and the other seven crewmen did not.

=== 14 May ===
List of shipwrecks: 14 May 1899
Ship	State	Description
Ohau	New Zealand	The 411 ton schooner, carrying timber and coal, supposed foundered in a heavy gale. Last seen off Cape Campbell. Some wreckage was found near Castlepoint. Lost with all 22 crew. The collier belonged to Union Steamship. A council-published heritage trail says locals still find coal on the shore near Cape Campbell, likely from the Ohau. She and sister ship, Taupo, were built by William Denny and Brothers. The Ohau arrived on 14 January 1885 and Taupo on 10 March 1885.

=== 16 May ===
List of shipwrecks: 16 May 1899
Ship	State	Description
Ganges	United States	The schooner was sunk in a collision with Presque Isle (United States) in Lake Erie near Colchester Light.
J. M. Spalding	United States	The schooner was scuttled at dock in Greenbush, Michigan to prevent her from being beaten to pieces by a strong wind. Raised the next day.
Vigilant	United States	The sloop was driven onto Ditch Shoal by wind and seas. Refloated on 23 May.

=== 18 May ===
List of shipwrecks: 18 May 1899
Ship	State	Description
Erie	United States	The steamer struck a boulder and sank near Van Buren Reef.

=== 21 May ===
List of shipwrecks: 21 May 1899
Ship	State	Description
Brittania	United States	The sloop struck a sunken wreck four miles (6.4 km) north west of the Gilbert's Bar, Florida Life Saving Station and was beached. Refloated and repaired.
Paris	United States	The passenger liner was wrecked on The Manacles, off Lowland Point, near Coverack, Cornwall, England. The Falmouth and Porthoustock lifeboats helped transfer her passengers to tugs. She was eventually refloated on 11 July, repaired, and returned to service as Philadelphia.

=== 22 May ===
List of shipwrecks: 22 May 1899
Ship	State	Description
Addie	United States	The lumber schooner struck the bar at Indian River Inlet and sprung a leak. She was worked off the bar by the United States Life-Saving Service and was sailed into the harbor where she filled and sank.

=== 25 May ===
List of shipwrecks: 25 May 1899
Ship	State	Description
Florence Pearl	United States	The schooner stranded on Shovelfull Shoal, sprung a leak and filled. Crew rescued by the United States Life-Saving Service. The wreck later drifted off the shoal and broke up.

=== 26 May ===
List of shipwrecks: 26 May 1899
Ship	State	Description
Amelia	United States	The schooner stranded on middle ground of the pass at San Louis, Texas, sprung a leak and filled. Three crew and four passengers were rescued by a vessel. Attempts to salvage were called off two days later and she was abandoned after being stripped.

== June ==
=== 1 June ===
List of shipwrecks: 1 June 1899
Ship	State	Description
A. J. Wright	United States	The canal boat burned in the Thames River, Connecticut near Allyn's Point.

=== 2 June ===
List of shipwrecks: 2 June 1899
Ship	State	Description
Antelope	United States	The steamer, beached for repairs, listed and sank on the Coquille River with only her deckhouse above water. Righted and refloated two days later.

=== 4 June ===
List of shipwrecks: 4 June 1899
Ship	State	Description
Lindus	New South Wales	The coastal cargo ship was wrecked during a storm on the wreck of the coastal cargo ship Colonist (New South Wales) near Oyster Bank, Newcastle, New South Wales, Australia, at position 32.914°S 151.797°E.
O. M. Nelson	United States	The schooner stranded on Pilot Island in Lake Michigan two and a quarter miles (3.6 km) south east of the Plum Island Life Saving Station in fog and a gale. The crew and the captain's daughter rescued by the United States Life-Saving Service. Stripped and abandoned on 7 June. Total loss.
R.G. Stewart	United States	The packet steamer burned and sank in Lake Superior off Michigan Island in Chequamegon Bay, Lake Superior, with the loss of one life. The other 11 people on board survived, as did the ship's cargo of cattle, which were pushed overboard and swam to shore.

=== 5 June ===
List of shipwrecks: 5 June 1899
Ship	State	Description
Unknown	United States	A sloop capsized and sank in Dorchester Bay in a sudden squall. The crew were rescued by the United States Life-Saving Service.

=== 10 June ===
List of shipwrecks: 10 June 1899
Ship	State	Description
Charles A. Swift	United States	The schooner ran aground and was wrecked on the west side of the entrance to Perdido Bay.
Lota	United States	The laid up steamer burned at her dock at Big Timber Creek, New Jersey.
William Fletcher	United States	The steamer sank in the North River near the New Jersey shore when struck from behind by Campania (United States).

=== 12 June ===
List of shipwrecks: 12 June 1899
Ship	State	Description
Addie Luddington	United States	The fishing schooner was sunk in a collision with S. S. Spartan (United States) off the Brandywine in thick fog. The crew were rescued by S. S. Spartan.

=== 13 June ===
List of shipwrecks: 13 June 1899
Ship	State	Description
Macedonia	Germany	The 2,268-gross register ton steam cargo ship sank in 60 feet (18 m) of water in the North Atlantic Ocean off Sea Bright, New Jersey, at 40°21.418′N 073°56.153′W with the loss of one life after colliding with the ocean liner Hamilton (United States) in thick fog. There were 18 survivors.

=== 15 June ===
List of shipwrecks: 15 June 1899
Ship	State	Description
City of Gloucester	United States	The steamer went ashore on Deer Island in Boston Harbor.
Wabashene	United Kingdom	The lumber schooner sprung a leak in heavy seas in Lake Superior and was towed into Harbor at Marquette, Michigan where she sank at dock. Refloated on 17 June.

=== 16 June ===
List of shipwrecks: 16 June 1899
Ship	State	Description
Blücher (Bluecher)	Germany	The passenger steamer was struck by the steamship Poelitz on the river Oder, near the village of Züllichau (Zuelichow), close to Stettin (now Szczecin). Blücher sank with about 30 passengers drowned; 10 were saved.

=== 17 June ===
List of shipwrecks: 17 June 1899
Ship	State	Description
Argus	United States	The tow steamer and the barge she was towing were wrecked on Montauk Point.

=== 22 June ===
List of shipwrecks: 22 June 1899
Ship	State	Description
Florence	United States	The schooner stranded one-half mile (0.80 km) north east of the Gurnet Point, Massachusetts Life Saving Station in heavy seas. She broke up, a total loss.
Nellie Torrent	United States	The steamer burned off Lime Island on the St. Marys River.

=== 23 June ===
List of shipwrecks: 23 June 1899
Ship	State	Description
Apalachie	United States	The steamer struck a snag in the Chipola River Cut Off and sank. One crewman died.

=== 25 June ===
List of shipwrecks: 25 June 1899
Ship	State	Description
Joe Mathews	United States	Carrying 12 passengers, a crew of five, and a cargo of 17 tons of general merchandise, the 31-gross register ton, 45.8-foot (14.0 m) steamer was wrecked without loss of life at the mouth of the Snake River near Cape Nome on the coast of the District of Alaska.
Satisfaction	United States	The steamer burned 12 miles (19 km) north of Sheboygan, Wisconsin.
Yazonia	United States	The steamer burned at Brown's Landing on the Tallahatchie River. Wreck removed with explosives in 1900.

=== 26 June ===
List of shipwrecks: 26 June 1899
Ship	State	Description
Gate City	United States	The barge sank near Petersburg, Kentucky. Two crewmen from the steamer towing her died.
Pawnee	United States	The steamer burned and sank 90 miles (140 km) north of the Hatteras Lightship. Her crew were rescued by George W. Clyde (United States).

=== 28 June ===
List of shipwrecks: 28 June 1899
Ship	State	Description
Black Diamond	United States	The steamer was sunk at Maberry, Arkansas by a broken suction pipe on a pump.
Margaret Olwill	United States	The steamer capsized and sank in a gale in Lake Erie off Lorain, Ohio. Her master, five crewmen, a woman and a boy died.

=== 30 June ===
List of shipwrecks: 30 June 1899
Ship	State	Description
Mayflower	United States	The steamer sank in the throughfare between the Roanoke River and the Cashie River. One infant drowned.

=== Unknown date ===
List of shipwrecks: Unknown June 1899
Ship	State	Description
Acceptor	United Kingdom	The 71.2-foot (21.7 m) trawler was wrecked sometime in June in the Bunbeg River, County Donegal, Ireland, UK.

== July ==
=== 2 July ===
List of shipwrecks: 2 July 1899
Ship	State	Description
Willard Ainsworth	United States	While on a voyage from Port Clarence to Kotzebue Sound in the District of Alaska with a crew of ten and a cargo of four tons of coal, the 42-gross register ton, 63.8-foot (19.4 m) schooner was driven ashore on Chamisso Island in a gale and wrecked without loss of life.

=== 4 July ===
List of shipwrecks: 4 July 1899
Ship	State	Description
Majestic	United States	The steamer stranded in thick fog eight miles (13 km) south of the Baileys Harbor, Wisconsin Life Saving Station. Refloated 9 July.

=== 5 July ===
List of shipwrecks: 5 July 1899
Ship	State	Description
Three Sisters	United Kingdom	The ketch sank in the Bristol Channel after colliding with the steamship Tweed with the loss of two of her three crew. She was on a voyage from Port Talbot, Glamorgan to Llangrannog, Cardiganshire.

=== 7 July ===
List of shipwrecks: 7 July 1899
Ship	State	Description
Fra Diavola	United States	The steam yacht sank in a collision off Pier 8, North River with wrecking tug Hustler (United States). Passengers and crew rescued by Hustler.

=== 10 July ===
List of shipwrecks: 10 July 1899
Ship	State	Description
Portia	United Kingdom	The steamer was wrecked west of Halifax, Nova Scotia. Her boats were used to go to inner Sambro Island. One 10-year-old boy was lost.

=== 11 July ===
List of shipwrecks: 11 July 1899
Ship	State	Description
S. W. Schuyler No.2	United States	The steamer burned at Vansciver's Warf in the Rancocas River.

=== 12 July ===
List of shipwrecks: 12 July 1899
Ship	State	Description
City of York	United Kingdom	The three-masted barque sank off Rottnest Island, Western Australia.

=== 16 July ===
List of shipwrecks: 16 July 1899
Ship	State	Description
John A. McKie	United States	The schooner stranded one mile (1.6 km) north of the Ship Bottom, New Jersey Life Saving Station and was wrecked. She was stripped of valuables.
Vicksburg	United States	The schooner struck a rock in the Muscle Ridge Channel and sprung a leak. She went to Seal Harbor, Maine and sank at anchor. She was stripped and abandoned to a wrecking company.

=== 18 July ===
List of shipwrecks: 18 July 1899
Ship	State	Description
Mountaneer	United States	The steamer was sunk by a snag above Charleston, West Virginia. Raised and re-hulled.

=== 19 July ===
List of shipwrecks: 19 July 1899
Ship	State	Description
George A. Dean	United States	The tow steamer sank 15 miles (24 km) off Highlands, New Jersey due to a defective sea cock.

=== 21 July ===
List of shipwrecks: 21 July 1899
Ship	State	Description
Nunobiki Maru	Japan	The steamer foundered off Formosa (now Taiwan) in a typhoon.

=== 22 July ===
List of shipwrecks: 22 July 1899
Ship	State	Description
Henrietta	United States	The steamer struck an obstruction at Whitehall, Louisiana and sank.

=== 25 July ===
List of shipwrecks: 25 July 1899
Ship	State	Description
Gossoon	United States	The steamer struck a tow cable running between the tug Conneaut (United States) and steamer Colgate (United States) and sank at Buffalo, New York.

=== 26 July ===
List of shipwrecks: 26 July 1899
Ship	State	Description
HMS Clarence	United Kingdom	The reformatory ship – formerly the screw ship-of-the-line HMS Royal William (Royal Navy) – was destroyed by arson near New Ferry on the Wirral Peninsula in England.

=== 27 July ===
List of shipwrecks: 27 July 1899
Ship	State	Description
Baird and Lymon	United States	The canal boat sank in a collision off Blackwells Island in the East River with Massachusetts (United States).
Sea Gull	United States	The freighter capsized at dock at Spear Street Wharf, San Francisco, California.

=== 29 July ===
List of shipwrecks: 29 July 1899
Ship	State	Description
Bob Anderson	United States	The steamer burned at Grand Marais, Minnesota.
Grace A. Ruelle	United States	The steamer sprung a leak and sank in Lake Huron off Pointe aux Barques. One person died.
Pilot	United States	The steamer burned between Cedar River, Michigan and Menominee, Michigan.
Shamrock	United States	The sloop was damaged in a collision with a tug. She was towed into Cleveland, Ohio where she sank at a slip.

=== 30 July ===
List of shipwrecks: 30 July 1899
Ship	State	Description
C. M. Belshaw	United States	The steamer struck a snag and sank near Dandy Point, Oregon in the Columbia River.
Consuelo	United States	The steam yacht burned at Alexandria Bay, New York.
Grace A. Ruelle	United States	The steamer sprung a leak and sank in Lake Huron 7 miles off Sand Beach, Michigan. Her engineer was picked up off an improvised raft by a passing steamer, her Captain died. swimming to shore

=== 31 July ===
List of shipwrecks: 31 July 1899
Ship	State	Description
Louisa	United States	The steamer was pushed ashore after damage to her wheel, sinking in nine feet (2.7 m) of water off the coast of the District of Alaska 6 nautical miles (11 km; 6.9 mi) west of St. Michael. Later raised.
Saint Michael #8	United States	Anchored while under tow by the steamer Louise (United States) from St. Michael to Fort Gibbon in the District of Alaska after Louise suffered machinery damage in rough seas, the 240-ton barge, with a three-man crew and a cargo of 225 tons of United States Government supplies aboard, dragged her anchor and was wrecked on the coast of the District of Alaska 6 nautical miles (11 km; 6.9 mi) west of St. Michael, breaking in two and becoming a total loss. Louise rescued her crew.

=== Unknown date ===
List of shipwrecks: Unknown date July 1899
Ship	State	Description
Hattie E. Worcester	United States	The fishing schooner went ashore on the north east Bar of Sable Island, Nova Scotia in thick fog on the 7th or 17th, a total loss. Her crew rowed to the Nova Scotia coast in her Dories.
Oakland	New South Wales	The passenger-cargo ship ran aground at the Richmond River on the coast of New South Wales, Australia. She was refloated, repaired, and returned to service.

== August ==
=== 1 August ===
List of shipwrecks: 1 August 1899
Ship	State	Description
Albert Halsey	United States	1899 Carrabelle hurricane: The fishing schooner was driven ashore and wrecked at Carrabelle Harbor, Florida, during the hurricane.
Benjamin C. Cromwell	United States	1899 Carrabelle hurricane: The schooner was beached and wrecked at Dog Island, Florida, during the hurricane.
Cortesa	Unknown	1899 Carrabelle hurricane: The vessel was wrecked during the hurricane.
Hindos	Unknown	1899 Carrabelle hurricane: The vessel was wrecked during the hurricane.
Jafnhar	Unknown	1899 Carrabelle hurricane: The vessel was wrecked during the hurricane.
James A. Garfield	United States	James A. Garfield (center) beached after the hurricane. 1899 Carrabelle hurricane: The three-masted bark was beached at Dog Island, Florida, during the hurricane. She was intact, but salvaging her was deemed impossible.
Latava	Unknown	1899 Carrabelle hurricane: The vessel was wrecked during the hurricane.
Mary E. Morse	Unknown	1899 Carrabelle hurricane: The vessel was wrecked during the hurricane.
Unknown	mostly United States	1899 Carrabelle hurricane: Approximately 57 other vessels was beached and wrecked during the hurricane.
Unknown	United States	1899 Carrabelle hurricane: The sloop capsized and was blown ashore near the Cape St. George Lighthouse during the hurricane. A couple was found dead on board.
Vale	Norway	1899 Carrabelle hurricane: The lumber bark was beached and wrecked at Apalachicola Bay, Florida, during the hurricane.
Vivette	Unknown	1899 Carrabelle hurricane: The vessel was wrecked during the hurricane.
Warren Adams	United States	1899 Carrabelle hurricane: The schooner was beached and wrecked at St. George Island, Florida, during the hurricane.

=== 2 August ===
List of shipwrecks: 2 August 1899
Ship	State	Description
Fidgett	United States	The tow steamer burned at a wharf in Pennsville, New Jersey.

=== 4 August ===
List of shipwrecks: 4 August 1899
Ship	State	Description
Advance	United States	The steamer caught fire and sank at Middleport, Ohio after being struck by lightning.

=== 5 August ===
List of shipwrecks: 5 August 1899
Ship	State	Description
Otis P. Lord	United States	The fishing schooner was sunk in a collision off Seal Island.

=== 6 August ===
List of shipwrecks: 6 August 1899
Ship	State	Description
H. A. Emory	United States	The schooner stranded trying to enter harbor at Sand Beach, Michigan on Lake Huron during strong wind and rough seas. She was scuttled to prevent breaking up from pounding on the bottom. Attempts to salvage began the next day and were unsuccessful, with the vessel being stripped and abandoned on 18 August, a total loss.
W. B. Morley	United States	The steamer collided with the car ferry Lansdowne (Canada) and sank in the Detroit River.

=== 7 August ===
List of shipwrecks: 7 August 1899
Ship	State	Description
Iowa	United States	The steamer struck an obstruction and sank between Henderson, Kentucky and Paducah, Kentucky.
East Lothian	United Kingdom	The schooner was in collision with the battleship Sans Pareil in the English Channel, and sank, killing one of the schooner's crew.

=== 11 August ===
List of shipwrecks: 11 August 1899
Ship	State	Description
June	United States	The sloop yacht stranded trying to enter Oregon Inlet, North Carolina and broke up. The crew were rescued by the United States Life Saving Service.
M. W. Hunt	United States	The laid up steamer sank at Almond Street Wharf. Later raised.

=== 12 August ===
List of shipwrecks: 12 August 1899
Ship	State	Description
Bessie	United States	The steamer collided with Ireland (Canada) near Belle Isle in the Detroit River and was beached on the isle. Later refloated and drydocked.

=== 13 August ===
List of shipwrecks: 13 August 1899
Ship	State	Description
New Haven	United States	The tow steamer sprung a leak in the Mississippi River and sank at the foot of Biddle street, St. Louis, Missouri.
H. G. Cleveland	United States	The schooner sprang a leak 12 miles (19 km) west north west of the Cleveland, Ohio Life Saving Station. She was put under tow, but sank 8 miles (13 km) off Cleveland in Lake Erie.

=== 15 August ===
List of shipwrecks: 15 August 1899
Ship	State	Description
Angie and Nellie	United States	The steamer struck an obstruction in a cut north of Brunswick, Georgia and sank. Raised later.
Sagadahoc	United States	The lighter got hung up on the dock, heeled over and sank at Bath, Maine.

=== 16 August ===
List of shipwrecks: 16 August 1899
Ship	State	Description
Aaron Reppard	United States	The schooner dragged anchor in a terrific storm going into the breakers off Gull Shoal, North Carolina and went to pieces. The United States Life Saving Service saved all nine of her crew, and the captain's wife.
Florence Randall	United States	The schooner stranded in a furious storm two miles (3.2 km) south of the Big Kinnakeet, North Carolina Life Saving Station and was a total loss. The United States Life Saving Service saved three of her crew, five died.

=== 17 August ===
List of shipwrecks: 17 August 1899
Ship	State	Description
Fred Walton	United States	The hulk, being used as a lay boat by steamers, parted her moorings in a hurricane and stranded on Hog Shoal 2 miles (3.2 km) east north east of the Portsmouth, North Carolina Life Saving Station and was a total loss. Two of her crew were washed overboard and died. The United States Life Saving Service saved the other four of her crew when the wreck was discovered on 19 August.
Lydia A. Willis	United States	The schooner parted her anchor chain in a hurricane and stranded three miles (4.8 km) east of the Portsmouth, North Carolina Life Saving Station where it broke in two and filled with water and was a total loss. The United States Life Saving Service saved the shipkeeper and his wife when the wreck was discovered on 18 August.
Priscella	United States	The barkentine broke up at sea in a terrific storm before going into the breakers three miles (4.8 km) south of the Gull Shoal, North Carolina Life Saving Station. The captain's wife and Son, The mate, and a boy washed overboard at sea and died. The United States Life Saving Service saved the rest.
Robert W. Dasey	United States	The schooner stranded in a furious storm three-quarters mile (1.2 km) south of the Little Kinnakeet, North Carolina Life Saving Station and was a total loss. The United States Life Saving Service saved the whole crew. The wreck was sold on 30 August and abandoned by the captain.

=== 18 August ===
List of shipwrecks: 18 August 1899
Ship	State	Description
Annie	United States	The lightship sprung a leak in a severe storm three miles (4.8 km) offshore of the Chicamacomico Life-Saving Station, Rodanthe, North Carolina, on Hatteras Island in the Outer Banks. Her captain allowed the vessel to go ashore to save his crew. Her captain stayed around until the portion of the cargo of oil that floated ashore was sold on 30 August. The crew were rescued by the United States Life Saving Service.
Diamond Shoal Lightship No. 69	United States Lighthouse Service	The lightship parted her moorings in a severe storm and stranded one mile (1.6 km) south south west of the Creeds Hill, North Carolina Life Saving Station. The crew were rescued by the United States Life Saving Service. Refloated on 21 September and taken to Baltimore for repairs.
Frank	United States	The steamer got crowded onto a bar and sank opposite Buffalo, Iowa.
Minnie Bergen	United States	The schooner stranded on Sheffield Point one mile (1.6 km) east of the Quonochontaug, Rhode Island Life Saving Station and was a total loss. Her two crew made it to shore safely.

=== 19 August ===
List of shipwrecks: 19 August 1899
Ship	State	Description
Miriam	United States	The steam launch was being towed by Leah (United States) when heavy seas broke out her windows and she began to swamp in Norton Sound three miles (4.8 km) off Stewart's Island. She was pulled close to shore sinking in six feet (1.8 m) of water.
Penobscot	United States	The steamer ran aground on Knife Island, Lake Superior in dense fog. Raised and repaired.

=== 20 August ===
List of shipwrecks: 20 August 1899
Ship	State	Description
Hunter Savidge	United States	The schooner capsized in a sudden storm in Lake Huron 14 miles (23 km) north northeast of the Sand Beach, Michigan Life-Saving Station and sank. Five crewmen died; five were rescued by A. McVittie.

=== 21 August ===
List of shipwrecks: 21 August 1899
Ship	State	Description
Magic	United States	The boat dragged anchor and hit a ledge on Santa Rosa Island, California and was abandoned as a total loss.

=== 22 August ===
List of shipwrecks: 22 August 1899
Ship	State	Description
Carrie E. Phillips	United States	The schooner stranded in thick fog one-quarter mile (0.40 km) west of the White Head, Maine Life-Saving Station and broke up, a total loss. Her crew were rescued by the United States Life-Saving Service.
Gus Fowler	United States	The passenger steamer struck a snag in the Missouri River and sank in eight feet (2.4 m) of water at Mokane, Missouri.
Lem Meta	United States	The lumber schooner sprung a leak and was beached four and a half miles (7.2 km) north north east of the North Beach, Maryland Life-Saving Station. The tide floated her off the beach and she capsized, a total loss. She was stripped and part of her cargo of lumber salvaged.
Mayflower	United States	The steamer was damaged in a collision in dense fog with Yarmouth (United States) in Boston Harbor and was beached on Deer Island.

=== 24 August ===
List of shipwrecks: 24 August 1899
Ship	State	Description
Carrie E. Phillips	United States	The fishing schooner was wrecked at Whitehead, Maine, a total loss.
Henrietta Hill	United States	The schooner dragged anchor in a heavy storm and went ashore three miles (4.8 km) southeast of the Portsmouth, North Carolina Life-Saving Station. Her crew were rescued by the United States Life-Saving Service. Efforts to refloat the vessel were unsuccessful, a total loss. She was stripped and abandoned on 7 September.

=== 25 August ===
List of shipwrecks: 25 August 1899
Ship	State	Description
C. L. Pavy	United States	The steamer struck an obstruction in Bayou Lafourche and sank. Later raised

=== 26 August ===
List of shipwrecks: 26 August 1899
Ship	State	Description
Saint James	United States	The river steamer capsized and was lost in the Yukon River in the District of Alaska.

=== 29 August ===
List of shipwrecks: 29 August 1899
Ship	State	Description
Edward Rich	United States	The coastal schooner was wrecked on the Sandy Bay breakwater, a total loss.

=== 30 August ===
List of shipwrecks: 30 August 1899
Ship	State	Description
Edward Rich	United States	Carrying a cargo of granite paving blocks, the 79-foot (24 m), 74-gross register ton schooner sank without loss of life in up to 70 feet (21 m) of water at 42°40′39″N 070°35′25″W after striking the Sandy Bay Breakwater off Rockport, Maine, in fog.
Music	United States	The 93-foot (28.3 m) steam tug caught fire while tied up at a pier in Onekama, Michigan. She was cast adrift, drifted westward into Portage Lake, and sank near the middle of the lake.

=== Unknown date ===
List of shipwrecks: Unknown date August 1899
Ship	State	Description
Caleb Curtis	United States	The schooner was lost at Nome, District of Alaska.

== September ==
=== 2 September ===
List of shipwrecks: 2 September 1899
Ship	State	Description
Morgan City	United States	The steamer, transporting 708 soldiers and recruits as well as nurses and postal clerks under charter, ran aground on Yoko Island, Japan. She was backed off but found to be leaking badly and was beached on Ino Shima and was abandoned as a total loss. There were no deaths.

=== 3 September ===
List of shipwrecks: 3 September 1899
Ship	State	Description
Pointer	United States	The sloop ran into tidal rips off Race Point, Massachusetts and her tender capsized and banged into her hull holing it, the leak caused her to be beached and abandoned. The two men onboard and their wives were rescued by the United States Life-Saving Service.

=== 4 September ===
List of shipwrecks: 4 September 1899
Ship	State	Description
Red Cloud	United States	The tow steamer was wrecked in heavy seas in Lake Erie on Cedar Point.

=== 5 September ===
List of shipwrecks: 5 September 1899
Ship	State	Description
Douglas Houghton	United States	The steamer was sunk by the barge she was towing after a steering failure at Sailor's Encampment on the St. Marys River. Raised and repaired.

=== 7 September ===
List of shipwrecks: 7 September 1899
Ship	State	Description
Peerless	United States	The steamer, being towed by Industry (United States), was sunk in Duluth, Minnesota harbor near the Northern Pacific Railroad bridge in a collision with the barge A. Stewart (United States) in the tow of Buffalo (United States).

=== 8 September ===
List of shipwrecks: 8 September 1899
Ship	State	Description
Annie	United States	The lumber schooner sprang a leak and sank in shoal water four miles (6.4 km) west south west of the Smith Island, Virginia Life Saving Station. She was refloated and beached for repairs. She was refloated again on 17 September and taken to Norfolk, Virginia.
J. N. Harbin	United States	The steamer struck an obstruction and was sunk between Memphis, Tennessee and Pine Bluff, Arkansas. Raised and repaired.

=== 10 September ===
List of shipwrecks: 10 September 1899
Ship	State	Description
Emma	United States	The steamer burned at Punta Gorda, Florida.

=== 11 September ===
List of shipwrecks: 11 September 1899
Ship	State	Description
Arrow	United States	The sloop parted her anchor cable, went ashore and was wrecked one and a half miles (2.4 km) east of the Quogue Life-Saving Station. crew rescued by the United States Life-Saving Service.

=== 12 September ===
List of shipwrecks: 12 September 1899
Ship	State	Description
Jessie Russell	United States	The tow steamer sank in a collision off Pennsylvania Docks, Jersey City with Annie M. Bauer.

=== 16 September ===
List of shipwrecks: 16 September 1899
Ship	State	Description
Duraes	Norway	The steamer foundered off Elba, Italy.

=== 17 September ===
List of shipwrecks: 17 September 1899
Ship	State	Description
Jennie K.	United States	The steamer foundered in Norton Sound between the Mouth of the Yukon River and St. Michael, Alaska.
Susie	United States	The steamer burned at Anacortes, Washington.

=== 19 September ===
List of shipwrecks: 19 September 1899
Ship	State	Description
Sudie Wayman	United States	The schooner went ashore and was wrecked one mile (1.6 km) from the Atlantic City, New Jersey Life-Saving Station. Crew rescued by the United States Life-Saving Service.

=== 21 September ===
List of shipwrecks: 21 September 1899
Ship	State	Description
White Foam	United States	The schooner capsized and sank in a storm in Lake Huron thirteen miles (21 km) west of the Bois Blanc, Michigan Life-Saving Station. Total loss.

=== 22 September ===
List of shipwrecks: 22 September 1899
Ship	State	Description
Scotsman	United Kingdom	The passenger ship was wrecked in the Strait of Belle Isle with the loss of thirteen lives.

=== 24 September ===
List of shipwrecks: 24 September 1899
Ship	State	Description
Cleveland	United States	The steamer sprang a leak in heavy weather on Lake Michigan. She was towed into the Chicago River where she filled up and sank. Refloated the next day.
G. J. Dorr	United States	The steamer foundered in heavy weather between Michigan City, Illinois and South Chicago, Illinois.

=== 25 September ===
List of shipwrecks: 25 September 1899
Ship	State	Description
Comrade	United Kingdom	The schooner struck Grindstone Ledge in Fisherman's Island channel causing a severe leak. She put into Seal Harbor, Maine where she was beached. She was beached for two weeks until the tide was low enough for repairs and refloated on the next high tide.

=== 26 September ===
List of shipwrecks: 26 September 1899
Ship	State	Description
W. Y. Emory	United Kingdom	The schooner sprung a severe leak in a gale on Lake Ontario. She anchored off Bear Creek eighteen miles (29 km) east of the Charlotte, New York Life-Saving Station, and sank the next morning, a total loss. Her crew of five was rescued by the United States Life-Saving Service.

=== 27 September ===
List of shipwrecks: 27 September 1899
Ship	State	Description
Jupiter	United States	The steamer sank in a collision at Atlantic Basin, Brooklyn with steamer Hustler (United States).

=== 28 September ===
List of shipwrecks: 28 September 1899
Ship	State	Description
Laurada	United States	Carrying 18 passengers, a crew of 46, and 1,200 tons of assorted cargo including cattle and sheep on deck, the 1,256-gross register ton, 230.1-foot (70.1 m) steamer was run aground without loss of life in Zapadni Bay (56°34′N 169°41′W) on St. George Island in the Pribilof Islands in the Bering Sea to prevent her from sinking after she sprang a leak. She became a total loss. The revenue cutter USRC Thomas Corwin ( United States Revenue Cutter Service) rescued her passengers and crew, but her entire cargo was lost.

=== 29 September ===
List of shipwrecks: 29 September 1899
Ship	State	Description
Barge 2 (or Barge No. 2)	United States	With a cargo of 200 tons of general merchandise on board, the 300-ton barge sank in a gale in the middle of St. Michael Bay (63°27′N 162°00′W) on the west-central coast of the District of Alaska and was deemed a total loss.
Britomart	United States	The sloop sprung a leak and sank on Cana Island Reef in Lake Michigan seven miles (11 km) from the Baileys Harbor, Wisconsin Life-Saving Station. Hauled up on the beach 7 October and repaired, refloated the next day.
Clyde	United States	The steamer struck a snag and sank. Raised 15 October and towed to Carondelet, Missouri for repairs.
Nugget	United States	The prospecting steamer foundered at Nome, Alaska.

=== 30 September ===
List of shipwrecks: 30 September 1899
Ship	State	Description
International	United Kingdom	The steam cable layer came aground near Birling Gap Coastguard Station, Sussex, England, in bad weather.
Music	United States	The steamer burned at Onekama, Michigan.

== October ==
=== 1 October ===
List of shipwrecks: 1 October 1899
Ship	State	Description
Beaver	United States	The steamer foundered in a storm at St. Michael, Alaska.
E. E. Frost	United States	The steamer was struck from behind by New Orleans (United States) and sank at Buffalo, New York.

=== 3 October ===
List of shipwrecks: 3 October 1899
Ship	State	Description
Bay State	United Kingdom	The cargo ship was wrecked near Cape Ballard, Newfoundland.
Big Kanawha	United States	The steamer struck an obstruction and sank in the Ohio River at Ross's Landing. Raised and repaired.
Rescue	United States	The steamer struck a snag in the Yazoo River at Gum Grove Landing and sank. later raised.

=== 5 October ===
List of shipwrecks: 5 October 1899
Ship	State	Description
City of Memphis	United States	The steamer struck an obstruction and was sunk between Memphis, Tennessee and St. Louis, Missouri. Raised and repaired.
Dennis Valentine	United States	The steamer sank at Pier 20, East River, New York when she caught fire and the ship was flooded by efforts to put out the fire.
Leona	United States	The steamer sank at her slip on Forth Street, Hoboken, New Jersey when a collision with a passing barge pulled stay bolts out of her hull causing her to capsize to port and sink.
Maggie Ashton	United States	The steamer stranded on a Reef in Lake Huron three miles (4.8 km) north east of the Grindstone City, Michigan Life-Saving Station. Crew rescued by the United States Life-Saving Service. Efforts to refloat were unsuccessful and she was abandoned on 11 October, a total loss.
Ralph	United States	The steamer was wrecked in Winchester Bay, Oregon near the mouth of the Umpqua River. Her boiler and machinery was salvaged.

=== 8 October ===
List of shipwrecks: 8 October 1899
Ship	State	Description
Lulu F.	United States	The steamer hit the cofferdam of the Baltimore and Ohio Railroad bridge and sank at Parkersburg, West Virginia. Raised and repaired.
Record	United States	The tow steamer, towing James B. Neilson (United States), was capsized and sunk when Neilson suddenly gained speed and hit the tug. One crewman died.

=== 9 October ===
List of shipwrecks: 9 October 1899
Ship	State	Description
M. M. Drake	United States	The steamer burned at Charlotte, New York.
Thomas W. Holder	United Kingdom	The schooner stranded in thick fog and high surf on a bar two miles (3.2 km) north of the Cahoon Hollow Beach Life-Saving Station, and later was pushed by waves over the bar, a total loss. Her crew of seven made it to shore in her boat with assistance by the United States Life-Saving Service.

=== 12 October ===
List of shipwrecks: 12 October 1899
Ship	State	Description
Stone City	United States	The steamer was wrecked on Little Cedar Shoal.

=== 13 October ===
List of shipwrecks: 13 October 1899
Ship	State	Description
Romana	United States	The schooner stranded in thick fog two miles (3.2 km) west of the Gilgo, New York Life-Saving Station, She was stripped of useful items and abandoned, a total loss. Her crew walked to shore.

=== 14 October ===
List of shipwrecks: 14 October 1899
Ship	State	Description
Nutmeg State	United States	The steamer caught fire two miles (3.2 km) east of Execution Point, she was beached off Sands Point, New York. Two crewmen and possibly five passengers drowned when a lifeboat capsized.
Pottsville	United States	The tow steamer wrecked in thick fog on the rocks at Norwalk Lighthouse and then burned.
Typo		The wreck of Typo still stands upright at the bottom of Lake Huron. The wooden three-masted schooner collided with the steamer W. P. Ketcham in Lake Huron off the coast of Michigan six miles (9.7 km) east-southeast of the Presque Isle Light. She sank immediately in 195 feet (59 m) of water at 45.29125°N 83.31585°W and her entire crew of four drowned.

=== 17 October ===
List of shipwrecks: 17 October 1899
Ship	State	Description
Saint Michael #1	United States	In use as a lighter with a crew of four, the 228-ton barge, with a deck load of 175 tons of general cargo, broke loose from her moorings and was wrecked at the mouth of the Snake River at Nome, District of Alaska, becoming a total loss. There were no deaths.

=== 18 October ===
List of shipwrecks: 18 October 1899
Ship	State	Description
Hazel Kirke	United States	The steamer was sunk in a collision off Bay Street, Jersey City, with F. W. Devoe (United States).

=== 20 October ===
List of shipwrecks: 20 October 1899
Ship	State	Description
Two-Forty	United States	The schooner was run down and sunk by Ardandhu (United Kingdom) in Boston Harbor in the Shipping Cannel one mile (1.6 km) north east of the City Point, Massachusetts Life-Saving Station. She was raised and repaired. One person died; three missing. Survivors were rescued by a boat from Ardandhu and the schooner James and Ella (United States).

=== 22 October ===
List of shipwrecks: 22 October 1899
Ship	State	Description
W. H. Scott	United States	The steamer burned at a dock at the foot of Thirty-Second Street, South Brooklyn.

=== 25 October ===
List of shipwrecks: 25 October 1899
Ship	State	Description
Ethel B. Jacobs	United States	The fishing schooner was wrecked on Abbey Island, Darrynane, Ireland.

=== 28 October ===
List of shipwrecks: 28 October 1899
Ship	State	Description
Mermaid	United States	The 273-ton whaling bark was lost in a storm at Dutch Harbor, District of Alaska. One of her crewmen perished. She was condemned, but later was rebuilt and returned to service.

=== 29 October ===
List of shipwrecks: 29 October 1899
Ship	State	Description
Hibernia	United States	The laid up steamer burned at Kleinston, Mississippi.

=== 30 October ===
List of shipwrecks: 30 October 1899
Ship	State	Description
Dolphin	United States	The steamer was wrecked at Rockport.
George L. Colwell	United States	The steamer broke up and sank in a hurricane in the Atlantic Ocean off the southern seaboard. Her master was rescued by Navahoe (United States) and landed at Charleston, South Carolina, the other 12 crewmen were lost.
J. W. Somers	United States	The schooner stranded one mile (1.6 km) south east of the Indian River Inlet Life-Saving Station while trying to enter the harbor. She was thrown over the bar and onto the beach by heavy seas 200 yards (180 m) south of the inlet. She was stripped and abandoned, a total loss.
Roger Moore	United States	The schooner stranded one mile (1.6 km) east south east of the Big Kinnakeet, North Carolina Life-Saving Station during a gale, a total loss. Crew rescued by the United States Life-Saving Service.
Thomas Tracy	United States	The tow steamer was damaged in a collision in the East River with Ferry Garden City (United States). She sank at Washington Street Dock soon after.

=== 31 October ===
List of shipwrecks: 31 October 1899
Ship	State	Description
Chicago	United States	The ferry steamer was sunk in a collision off Pier 13 in the North River with City of Augusta (United States). Survivors rescued by various vessels. One life lost. Later raised.
Falmouth	United States	The schooner parted her anchor cable and stranded two miles (3.2 km) north of the Rehoboth Beach, Delaware Life-Saving Station in thick and stormy weather, a total loss. crew made it to shore on a line.
Mary B. Rogers	United States	The lumber schooner sprung a leak and became waterlogged three miles (4.8 km) east south east of the Jerrys Point, New Hampshire Life-Saving Station. She was beached in Portsmouth, New Hampshire for repairs.

=== Unknown date ===
List of shipwrecks: Unknown date October 1899
Ship	State	Description
Llandaff	United Kingdom	The Welsh collier was wrecked at Bude, Cornwall, England.

== November ==
=== 1 November ===
List of shipwrecks: 1 November 1899
Ship	State	Description
William H. Dunham	United States	The schooner parted her moorings and went ashore at Otter Creek, Michigan in Lake Michigan in a gale. She was refloated on 13 November.

=== 2 November ===
List of shipwrecks: 2 November 1899
Ship	State	Description
USS Charleston	United States Navy	The cruiser was wrecked on an uncharted reef off Camiguin Island in the Philippines. Her wreck was deemed beyond salvage and was abandoned.
Kodiak	United States	The steamer burned at Oakland Creek, California and was scuttled. Raised on 11 November.

=== 4 November ===
List of shipwrecks: 4 November 1899
Ship	State	Description
Plover	United Kingdom	The brig stranded near the Sandy Point Island Life-Saving Station. She was refloated on 11 November. Her crew were rescued by the United States Life-Saving Service.

=== 5 November ===
List of shipwrecks: 5 November 1899
Ship	State	Description
Edward S. Pease	United States	The steamer sank after striking a dock in a gale at Ashtabula.

=== 6 November ===
List of shipwrecks: 6 November 1899
Ship	State	Description
R. Eacrett	United States	During a voyage from Nome, District of Alaska, to San Francisco, California, the 32.11-gross register ton, 49.5-foot (15.1 m) two-masted schooner was wrecked on the eastern end of St. Lawrence Island in the Bering Sea, 20 nautical miles (37 km; 23 mi) east of Cape Kukuliak (or "Nukuliak"). Her six-man crew made it to shore, but five of them died before the whaling bark Alaska (United States) arrived on 1 June 1900 and picked up the last remaining survivor. He also survived the wreck of Alaska off Nome on 6 June 1900.

=== 8 November ===
List of shipwrecks: 8 November 1899
Ship	State	Description
Pottsville	United States	The steamer sank in Swans Island Channel. Raised and repaired.

=== 10 November ===
List of shipwrecks: 10 November 1899
Ship	State	Description
Belgique	Belgium	Formerly called Mount Hebron, the ship foundered six nautical miles (11 km) northwest of the Casquets.
Hattie	United States	The steamer burned at Point Gadsden Light.

=== 11 November ===
List of shipwrecks: 11 November 1899
Ship	State	Description
Duisberg	Norway	The barque ran aground at Oxwich Point, Glamorgan, United Kingdom and was wrecked. Her crew survived. She was on a voyage from Parrsboro, Nova Scotia to The Mumbles, Glamorgan.

=== 12 November ===
List of shipwrecks: 12 November 1899
Ship	State	Description
Gromoboi	Imperial Russian Navy	The cruiser ran aground off Kronstadt. She was on a voyage from Saint Petersburg to Kronstadt. She was refloated on 14 November and taken into Kronstadt.

=== 13 November ===
List of shipwrecks: 13 November 1899
Ship	State	Description
General Admiral Apraksin	Imperial Russian Navy	The battleship ran aground off Hogland and was abandoned by her crew. She was on a voyage from Kronstadt to Libava, Courland Governorate. She was refloated in mid-April 1900 and taken into Kronstadt. Repaired at a cost in excess of 175,000 руб. and returned to service.

=== 20 November ===
List of shipwrecks: 20 November 1899
Ship	State	Description
Natchez	United States	The steamer struck an obstruction and sank in the Mississippi River off Ford's Crossing. Later raised.

=== 21 November ===
List of shipwrecks: 21 November 1899
Ship	State	Description
Canary	United Kingdom	The schooner was in a collision with David S. Siner (United States) near Tuckernuck Shoal and was abandoned as a loss. Her crew were rescued by David S. Siner.

=== 25 November ===
List of shipwrecks: 25 November 1899
Ship	State	Description
Fountain	United States	The steamer lost a hull plank off Westchester in the Long Island Sound and sank.
Maggie J. Jory	United States	The steamer sank in Hampton Roads when it came in contact with a hawser of tow tug Volunteer (United States). One life lost.

=== 26 November ===
List of shipwrecks: 26 November 1899
Ship	State	Description
Sylvester Whalen	United States	The fishing schooner run down and sunk by schooner Major Pickanes 50 miles east of the Highland Light. Two crewmen drownd.

=== 27 November ===
List of shipwrecks: 27 November 1899
Ship	State	Description
Adventure	United States	The 12-ton, 37.4-foot (11.4 m) schooner dragged her anchors, drifted ashore, and became a total loss at Point Arden (58°09′30″N 134°10′30″W) off Admiralty Island in the Alexander Archipelago in Southeast Alaska. All four people on board – three men and a woman – survived.

=== 29 November ===
List of shipwrecks: 29 November 1899
Ship	State	Description
Columbia River Lightship No. 50	United States Lighthouse Service	The lightship parted her moorings and drifted out to sea. She was towed back but broke her tow cable crossing the bar and went ashore near McKinzie Head. The crew of eight was rescued by the United States Life Saving Service, troops of Battery M, 3rd Artillery, and citizens of Fort Stevens. After many failed salvage attempts she was moved overland by a house moving company and refloated in Baker's Bay, Washington on 2 June 1901, repaired and returned to service.

=== 30 November ===
List of shipwrecks: 30 November 1899
Ship	State	Description
Clara	United States	The schooner was sunk in a collision with Ericcson (United States) off Thompson's Point in the Delaware River. Her captain was rescued by Ericcson, but three crewmen lost.
Eureka	United States	The schooner suffered loss of part of her sails crossing the Coquille River Bar and went ashore one mile (1.6 km) from the Coquille River Life Saving Station. She broke up after being stripped.

== December ==
=== 1 December ===
List of shipwrecks: 1 December 1899
Ship	State	Description
New March	United States	The ferry burned at Badgers Island, Maine.
Wecott	United States	The steamer was wrecked when she suffered machinery failure while crossing the Humboldt Bay Bar, Ship and cargo were a total loss. One passenger and one crewman died, 8 survivors made it to shore on their own, and 14 were helped off by the United States Life-Saving Service.

=== 2 December ===
List of shipwrecks: 2 December 1899
Ship	State	Description
Montevideo	Italy	The Hammonia-class ocean liner ran aground and was wrecked in the River Plate
Pottsville	United States	The steamer sank in Swans Island Channel. Raised and repaired.

=== 3 December ===
List of shipwrecks: 3 December 1899
Ship	State	Description
Ismore	United Kingdom	The 7,744 GRT cargo ship on her passage from Birkenhead to Cape Town with a cargo of horses, military stores and ammunition as well as 455 men of the British Armed forces went aground on submerged rocks near Cape Columbine, and broke apart the next day. There were no casualties.

=== 7 December ===
List of shipwrecks: 7 December 1899
Ship	State	Description
Annie M. Bauer	United States	The tow steamer sank at her dock on Main Street, Brooklyn, New York. Later raised.

=== 8 December ===
List of shipwrecks: 8 December 1899
Ship	State	Description
Lillie M. Barlow	United States	The steamer struck an obstruction and sank in the Cane River off Derry Landing, Louisiana. Later raised.

=== 12 December ===
List of shipwrecks: 12 December 1899
Ship	State	Description
Colusa	United States	During a voyage from Kahului, Maui, Territory of Hawaii, to Sitka Sound in Southeast Alaska, the bark was wrecked without loss of life on rocks in Sitka Sound during a storm. Her captain, his wife, and her crew of 13 abandoned ship and reached Sitka, District of Alaska, on 16 December.

=== 13 December ===
List of shipwrecks: 13 December 1899
Ship	State	Description
Pacific	United States	The steamer was sunk in a collision with Charlie Clark (United States) near Jacks Run in the Ohio River.

=== 14 December ===
List of shipwrecks: 14 December 1899
Ship	State	Description
Rillie S. Derby	United States	The schooner stranded and sank on Hog Island Shoals four miles (6.4 km) from shore in a fresh wind and heavy seas, total loss Her crew of seven were rescued by United States Life-Saving Service.

=== 18 December ===
List of shipwrecks: 18 December 1899
Ship	State	Description
State of Kansas	United States	The steamer burned at New Madrid, Missouri.

=== 23 December ===
List of shipwrecks: 23 December 1899
Ship	State	Description
Laura Marion	United States	The steamer swamped trying to cross the Bar at the entrance to the Merrimack River in heavy seas. Her wreckage washed ashore the next day. Her boiler and part of the engine was salvaged. Her crew of 3 all died.

=== 24 December ===
List of shipwrecks: 24 December 1899
Ship	State	Description
Ariosto	United Kingdom	The steamer stranded 2 or 6 miles (3.2 or 9.7 km) south west of the Ocracoke, North Carolina Life Saving Station in thick weather, became a total loss. Her cargo was salvaged. 21 of her crew died, when her boat capsized. Three of the crew dumped in the water and six who had stayed on the ship were rescued by the United States Life-Saving Service.

=== 26 December ===
List of shipwrecks: 26 December 1899
Ship	State	Description
Lakme	United States	The steamer caught fire at Astoria, Oregon and was scuttled.
M. J. Soley	United Kingdom	The schooner stranded three miles (4.8 km) north north west of the Crumple Island, Maine Life Saving Station on Brig Ledge. She slid off the Ledge and sank in 6 fathoms (36 ft; 11 m) of water. Her wreck was sold to a salvage company that raised her. Her crew were rescued by the United States Life-Saving Service.

=== 27 December ===
List of shipwrecks: 22 December 1899
Ship	State	Description
Frank Thomson	United States	The launch was destroyed by fire at Brighton, Massachusetts.

=== 29 December ===
List of shipwrecks: 29 December 1899
Ship	State	Description
Laura Marion	United States	The tow steamer foundered on the bar at the entrance to the Merrimack River in a gale. Lost with all three hands.
Linda	United States	The steamer was destroyed by fire in the Red River. Five crewmen died.

=== 30 December ===
List of shipwrecks: 30 December 1899
Ship	State	Description
Thomas A. Hendricks	United States	The steamer burned in the Mississippi River near Prophet's Island.
Rabboni	United States	The schooner dismasted in a gale in Long Island Sound then dragged anchor into shallows 12 miles (19 km) west of the Rocky Point, New York Life Saving Station. Her wreckage washed ashore the next day, a total loss. Her crew were rescued by the United States Life-Saving Service.

=== 31 December ===
List of shipwrecks: 31 December 1899
Ship	State	Description
Carrie L. Hix	United States	The lime schooner struck the Dog Bar breakwater, Gloucester, Massachusetts, and went to pieces.

=== Unknown date ===
List of shipwrecks: Unknown date 1899
Ship	State	Description
Alaska Union	United States	The 214-gross register ton sternwheel paddle steamer dragged her anchors during a gale in Norton Sound off the northeast coast of St. Michael Island off the west coast of the District of Alaska and was stranded. Her crew survived, but she became a total loss.
Arcade	United States	The steamer was wrecked at St. Michael, District of Alaska, during a storm. She became a total loss
Mockingbird	United States	The vessel was lost in the harbor at Dyea, District of Alaska.
W. K. Merwin	United States	The steamer was blown ashore and wrecked near Nome, District of Alaska, near the mouth of the Snake River, or in Norton Sound near the mouth of the Yukon River on 10 August 1900, or 28 July 1900 or sometime in December 1899/January 1900.

== Unknown date ==
List of shipwrecks: Unknown date 1899
Ship	State	Description
Aji	Unknown	The schooner was lost on Island Beach on the coast of New Jersey.
Carl W. Baxter	United States	The fishing schooner was lost in a gale on the Brown Bank, either on 26 January, after being damaged the previous day, or on 15 February. Her crew were rescued by Mourne.
Frank A. Palmer	United States	The four-masted schooner grounded near Tathem's life-saving station in New Jersey. She was refloated on 23 July and returned to service.
James H. Hamilton	United States	The sternwheel paddle steamer was wrecked on a sand bar on the Yukon River in the District of Alaska, breaking her keel and becoming a total loss.
Karluk	United States	The launch was wrecked on the south-central coast of the District of Alaska near Cape Karluk (57°35′10″N 154°30′50″W).
Merrimac	United Kingdom	The cargo ship foundered with the loss of all 36 crew whilst on a voyage from Quebec City, Canada to Belfast, County Antrim.
N A T & T Co. No. 3	United States	The 120-ton barge sank in the waters of the District of Alaska. Contemporary sources disagree on the location of the sinking, reporting it as taking place at either Tugidak Island in the Kodiak Archipelago in the Gulf of Alaska or at St. Michael on the Bering Sea coast.
Politkofsky	United States	Carrying a cargo of coal, the 174.89-ton fuel barge went aground at Nome, District of Alaska, and was broken up by the surf.
Portland	United States	The fishing schooner was wrecked on the Middle Bank. The wreck was discovered on 1 March.
Richard Simpson	United Kingdom	The 110.6-foot (33.7 m) trawler was wrecked at Portland (?), Iceland either sometime in March, possibly 7 March, with the crew reaching Reykjavik by end of March, or wrecked 11 May.
Zaragoza	Royal Spanish Navy	The decommissioned torpedo training ship, a former armored frigate, was scuttled.
