= Typo (disambiguation) =

A typo (short for typographical error) is a mistake made in the typing process. The plural is typos.

Typo may also refer to:

- Typo (brand), a stationery brand owned by Cotton On Group
- Typo, Kentucky, a community in the United States
- Typo (schooner), an American wooden schooner (1873-1899)
- An abbreviation for typographer

== See also ==
- The Typos of Constans, an edict issued by Constans II in 647 or 648, forbidding Monothelite or Dyothelite beliefs among Christians.
- TYPO3, web-based content management system
- Type O, a blood type
- Type 0 (disambiguation)
