= 1899 Carrabelle hurricane =

Category 2 Atlantic hurricane

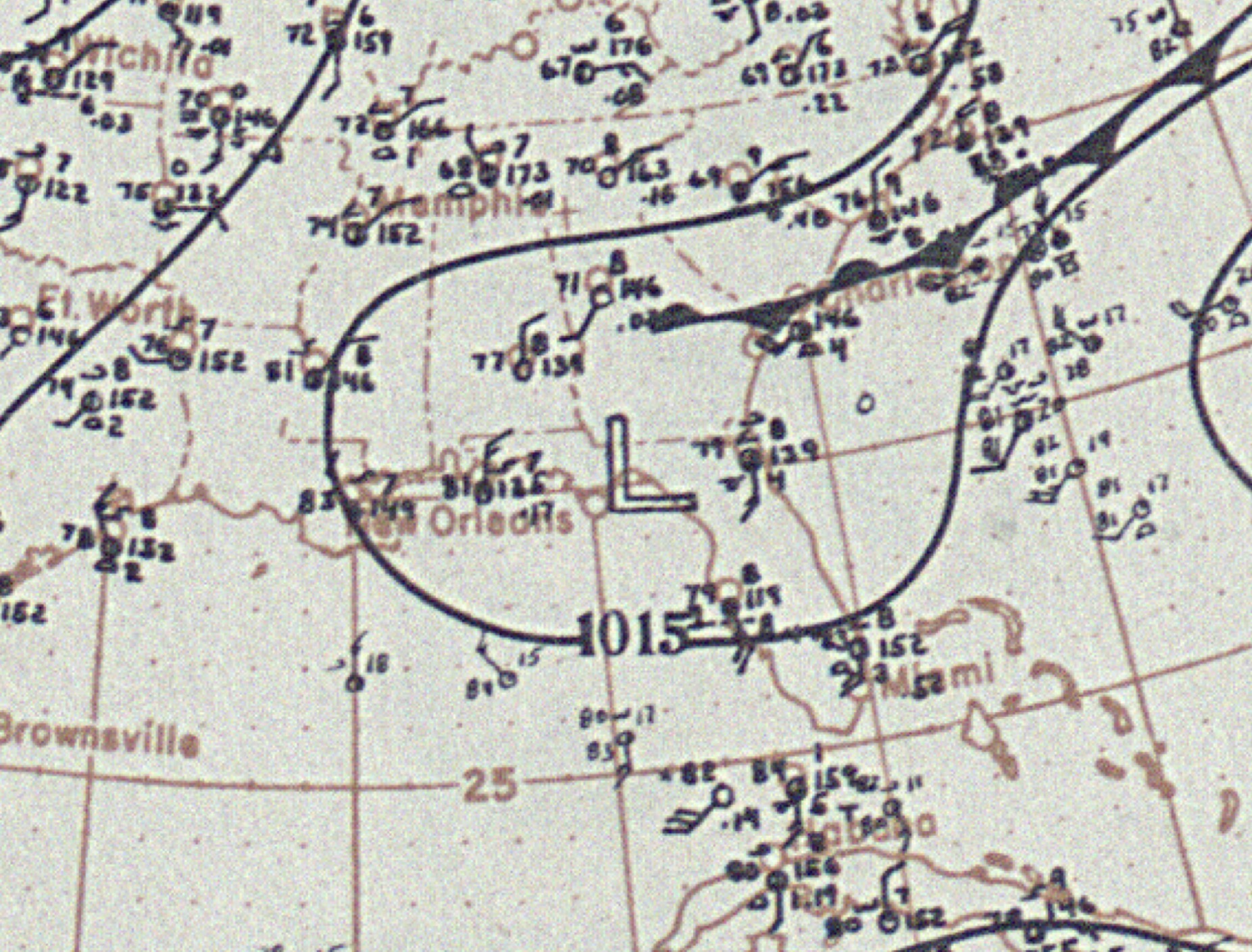
- Surface weather analysis on July 31, showing the hurricane near peak intensity as it approaches landfall in the Florida Panhandle

Meteorological history
- Formed: July 28, 1899
- Dissipated: August 2, 1899

Category 2 hurricane
- 1-minute sustained (SSHWS/NWS)
- Highest winds: 100 mph (155 km/h)
- Lowest pressure: 979 mbar (hPa); 28.91 inHg

Overall effects
- Fatalities: 9 direct (Note: It is likely that there were more than 9 fatalities associated with this storm, as reports from Santo Domingo state, "only one crew member on the three vessels survived".)
- Missing: 15
- Damage: $1 million (1899 USD)
- Areas affected: Dominican Republic, Florida, United States
- IBTrACS
- Part of the 1899 Atlantic hurricane season

The 1899 Carrabelle hurricane caused significant damage in the Dominican Republic and the Florida Panhandle of the United States. The second tropical cyclone and second hurricane of the 1899 Atlantic hurricane season, the storm was first observed south of the Dominican Republic on July 28, 1899. Shortly thereafter, it made landfall in Azua Province, Dominican Republic with an intensity equivalent to a Category 1 hurricane on the modern-day Saffir–Simpson hurricane wind scale. Early on July 29, the system weakened to a tropical storm, shortly before emerging into the Atlantic Ocean. It then moved west-northwestward and remained at the same intensity for the next 24 hours. The storm made landfall near Islamorada, Florida on July 30. It then brushed Southwest Florida before emerging into the Gulf of Mexico. The storm began to re-intensify on July 31 and became a hurricane later that day. Early on August 1, it peaked with winds of 100 mph (155 km/h), several hours before making landfall near Apalachicola, Florida, at the same intensity. The storm quickly weakened inland and dissipated over Alabama on August 2.

In the Dominican Republic, three large schooners were wrecked at Santo Domingo; only one crew member on the three vessels survived. "Great" damage was reported along coastal sections of the country while a loss of telegraph service impacted most of interior areas. In Florida, damage in the city of Carrabelle was extensive, where only nine houses remained. Losses in the city reached approximately $100,000 (1899 USD). (Note: All damage figures are in 1899 USD, unless otherwise noted) At least 57 shipping vessels were destroyed; damage from these ships collectively totaled about $375,000. Additionally, 13 lumber vessels were beached. Many boats at the harbor and the wharfs in Lanark were wrecked; large portions of stores and pavilions in the city were damaged. The towns of Curtis Mill and McIntyre were completely destroyed, while the resort city of St. Teresa suffered significant damage. Overall, seven deaths were confirmed in Florida and losses in the state reached at least $1 million.

== Meteorological history ==
Map plotting the storm's track and intensity, according to the Saffir–Simpson scale Map key Saffir–Simpson scale Tropical depression (≤38 mph, ≤62 km/h) Tropical storm (39–73 mph, 63–118 km/h) Category 1 (74–95 mph, 119–153 km/h) Category 2 (96–110 mph, 154–177 km/h) Category 3 (111–129 mph, 178–208 km/h) Category 4 (130–156 mph, 209–251 km/h) Category 5 (≥157 mph, ≥252 km/h) Unknown Storm type Tropical cyclone Subtropical cyclone Extratropical cyclone, remnant low, tropical disturbance, or monsoon depression

A "violent hurricane" was first observed near the south coast of Hispaniola at 12:00 UTC on July 27. Within the next six hours, the storm made landfall in Azua Province, Dominican Republic with winds of 80 mph (130 km/h) – equivalent to a Category 1 hurricane on the modern-day Saffir–Simpson hurricane wind scale. Early on July 28, it weakened to tropical storm while moving northwestward across northern Haiti. A few hours later, the storm emerged into the Atlantic near Port-de-Paix. The system maintained intensity for over 24 hours as it moved northwestward and parallel to the north coast of Cuba. At 10:00 UTC on July 30, the storm made landfall in the United States at Islamorada, Florida, on Upper Matecumbe Key, with winds of 45 mph (75 km/h). It weakened slightly and then moved just offshore or struck the mainland portion of Monroe County, Florida. Early on July 31, the storm began to re-strengthen while entering the eastern Gulf of Mexico.

The system re-intensified into a hurricane at 1200 UTC on July 31. Further deepening occurred, with the storm becoming a Category 2 hurricane early on August 1. Later that day, the hurricane made landfall between Carrabelle and Eastpoint, Florida, with winds of 100 mph (155 km/h). Reports at landfall indicate that the storm was small, spanning a diameter of only 40 miles (64 km). At 18:00 UTC on August 1 – about an hour after it moved inland – a weather station measured the storm's minimum barometric pressure of 979 mbar (28.9 inHg). Early on August 2, it weakened to a tropical storm and then a tropical depression several hours later. Shortly thereafter, it dissipating over southern Alabama.

== Impact ==
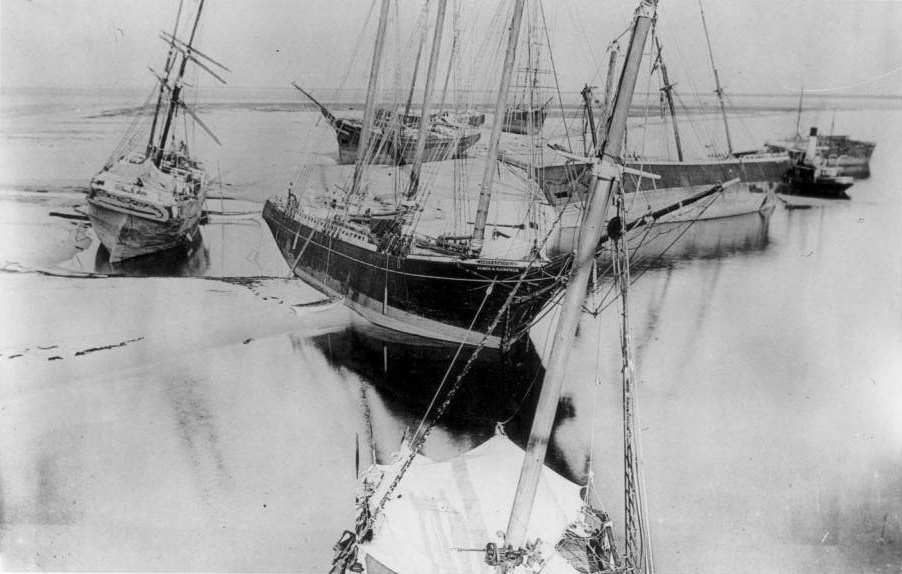
Ships wrecked at Dog Island in Florida

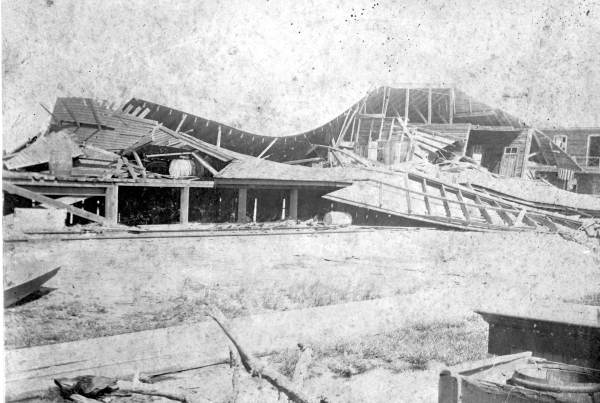
The destroyed railroad depot in Carrabelle, Florida

News reports indicate that a "violent" hurricane struck the Dominican Republic on July 28. Three large schooners were wrecked at Santo Domingo; only one crew member on the three vessels survived. "Great" damage was reported along coastal sections of the country, while a loss of telegraph service impacted most of interior areas.

Due to "somewhat threatening" weather conditions on July 30 and July 31, advisories were issued to stations across Florida, warning of the potential for strong winds. As a result, 40 vessels, coasting schooners, and spongers remained at port in Cedar Key. According to the displayman at Cedar Key, "they [the ships and sailors] would have sailed and some would have been lost" had they not received warnings.

At the time of the storm, it was described as "the most disastrous cyclone that ever visited this section of Florida". Losses from the storm in Florida reached at least $1 million. The city of Carrabelle was devastated; only nine houses in the city remained intact. According to the mayor, about 200 families were left homeless. Losses in the city reached approximately $100,000. One fatality occurred when a house collapsed on a woman; numerous other people in the area sustained injuries. At least 57 shipping vessels were destroyed, including 14 barques, 40 small boats, and 3 pilot boats. Losses for these ships collectively totaled about $375,000. At Chattahoochee, then known as River Junction, a mass meeting of citizens was held on August 4 to collect money for the victims of the storm in Carrabelle.

Additionally, 13 lumber vessels were beached. Torrential rains led to flooding, eroding railroads and highways. A 30-mile (48 km) portion of the Carrabelle, Tallahassee and Georgia Railroad was washed away. 200 fallen trees blocked the track, and every community along the line was reportedly "desolated". A passenger train was blown over 100 yd (91 m) from the track, injuring many passengers. Many boats at the harbor and the wharfs in Lanark were wrecked, and the summer resort of Lanark Inn was blown into the Gulf of Mexico. Large portions of stores and pavilions in the city were damaged. Virtually the entire town of McIntyre, on the Ochlockonee River, was destroyed, except for only two mill boilers, and a trestle bridge there was swept away. The city of Curtis Mill was completely destroyed. Additionally, the resort city of St. Teresa suffered significant damage. A total of fifteen ships either destroyed or beached at Dog Island, including the Benjamin C. Cromwell and James A. Garfield. At least 15 people were reported missing. Six drowning deaths were confirmed in association with this storm. After the storm, hundreds of onlookers, among them journalists, gathered in Carrabelle to observe the destruction. On seeing the damage, eyewitnesses marveled at the low death toll.

== See also ==
- Hurricane David
- Hurricane Erin (1995)
- Hurricane Isaac (2012)
- List of Florida hurricanes (pre-1900)
