= Nunobiki Maru =

Japanese steamship

History

Japan
- Name: Nunobiki Maru
- Builder: Caird & Company, Greenock, Scotland
- Launched: 30 November 1874
- Completed: 1874
- Fate: Foundered 21 July 1899

General characteristics
- Type: Steamship
- Tonnage: 1,336 grt
- Length: 79.3 m (260 ft 2 in) overall
- Beam: 9.2 m (30 ft 2 in)
- Propulsion: compound steam engine

Nunobiki Maru (布引丸, literally, Drawn Fabric) was a Japanese steamship known mainly for her attempted delivery of arms, most notably powerful Murata rifles, from Japan to the Philippines, a key event in Japanese–Filipino relations during the Philippine–American War.

== History ==
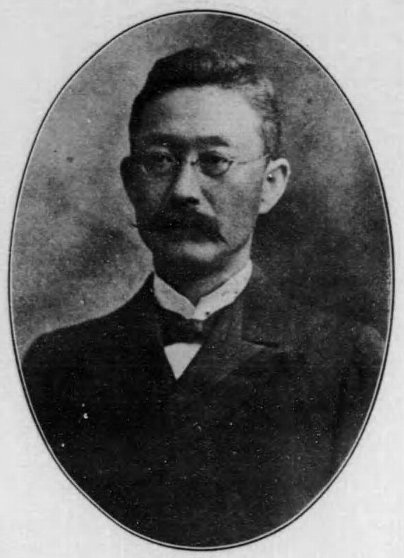
Yaroku Nakamura was instrumental in the delivery of arms to the Philippines.

In 1874, the steamship Nunobiki Maru was built by Caird & Company in Greenock, Scotland. The ship was first operated by the Stoomvaart Maatschappij Nederland as SS Sindoro. In 1896, it was acquired by Mitsui Bussan. The ship was best known for her delivery of arms. In 1899, Filipino diplomat Mariano Ponce gained the aid of Chinese revolutionary Sun Yat-sen in finding a way to procure arms. Sun sympathized with the Filipino cause during the Philippine–American War and may have seen the Philippines as a staging point for his revolution in China. With Sun's help, Ponce was able to meet pan-Asian Japanese philosopher Tōten Miyazaki and Japanese silviculturist Yaroku Nakamura. Sympathizing with the Filipino cause as well, Miyazaki and Nakamura managed to make an arms purchase amounting to 155,000 yen with Japanese trader Kihatiro Okura. This amount included the 18,000 yen used to purchase Nunobiki Maru, the ship used to deliver the arms. With the grant given by Nakamura's brother, Vice Minister of War Yujiro Nakamura, the deal was made.

On 20 June 1899, the ship sailed off from Nagasaki. The delivery was composed of 10,000 rifles, six million Murata rounds, a single fixed cannon, ten field guns, seven field glasses, equipment for handloading Murata cartridges including presses and dies, and other military supplies. In order to avoid the American blockade, the ship was supposed to anchor off Taiwan first before arriving in the Philippines. However, she foundered in a typhoon between Taihoku and Shanghai, and the ship was lost on 21 July 1899. Nunobiki Maru was foundered when she was 110 km (60 nautical miles) from the Saddle Islands at the mouth of Yangtze River. Despite the sinking of the Nunobiki Maru, Nakamura pressed on for a second delivery which included 2.5 million rounds of ammunition. However, the remaining crew of the Nunobiki Maru revealed the purpose of the cargo. This resulted in a diplomatic dispute between Japan and the United States. The second delivery never went through. Meanwhile, after the disaster that struck Nunobiki Maru, Miyazaki expressed his suspicion that Nakamura's intentions were driven more by profit than altruism, and came to state to Sun that the arms were defective and that ship herself might have been in bad condition when she set sail. In addition, after the incident, it became more difficult to deliver arms out of Japan.

== Technical details ==
Nunobiki Maru had a compound engine, a drive shaft, and a propeller. It was a ship transport protected by iron. She was 79.3 meters long, and her beam was 9.2 meters. Her hull number was 183.

== See also ==
- SS John Grafton
- List of shipwrecks in 1899
