= Type 0 =

Type 0 or Type O may refer to:

== Type 0 ==
=== Aircraft ===
- Type 0 Carrier Fighter Mitsubishi A6M, a Japanese fighter aircraft
- Type 0 Observation Seaplane Mitsubishi F1M, a Japanese reconnaissance seaplane
- Type 0 Reconnaissance Seaplane Aichi E13A, a Japanese reconnaissance seaplane
- Type 0 Small Reconnaissance Seaplane Yokosuka E14Y, a Japanese submarine-based reconnaissance seaplane
- Type 0 Transport Showa/Nakajima L2D, a Japanese transport aircraft

=== Watercraft ===
- Type-0 heavy lift vessel Dockwise Vanguard, a semi-submersible heavy lift ship

=== Entertainment ===
- Final Fantasy Type-0, a video game

=== Science and technology ===
- Glycogen storage disease type 0, a disease
- Type 0 civilization in the Kardashev scale of technological advancement
- Type-0 language or Recursively enumerable language in the Chomsky hierarchy of formal languages
- Type 0 string theory, a model of string theory
- Type 0 tape, an informal classification of audio cassette formulation that is a step below IEC Type I

== Type O ==
- Type O in the ABO blood group system
- an O-type star
  - an O-type main-sequence star
  - an O-type giant star
  - a subdwarf O star
- the Handley Page Type O, a biplane
- an O-type asteroid

== See also ==
- Typo (disambiguation)
