= Mariano Ponce =

Filipino physician, writer, and politician

The Honorable Mariano Ponce
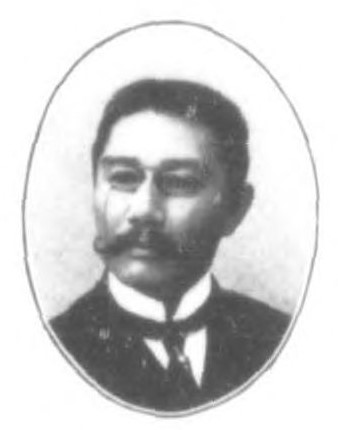
- Ponce as member of the Philippine Assembly, c. 1912

Member of the Philippine Assembly from Bulacan's 2nd district
- In office 1909–1912
- Preceded by: León María Guerrero
- Succeeded by: Ceferino de León

Personal details
- Born: Mariano Ponce y Collantes; March 22, 1863 Baliwag, Bulacan, Captaincy General of the Philippines, Spanish Empire
- Died: May 23, 1918 (aged 55) Sai Ying Pun, British Hong Kong, British Empire
- Resting place: Baliwag Catholic Cemetery
- Party: Nacionalista
- Spouse: Okiyo Udagawa
- Children: 4
- Parents: Mariano Ponce (father); Maria Collantes (mother)
- Education: Colegio de San Juan de Letran; University of Santo Tomas; Universidad Central de Madrid
- Occupation: Physician; writer; politician
- Known for: Philippine Revolution; La Solidaridad; Propaganda Movement
- Nicknames: Naning; Kalipulako; Tikbalang

Mariano Ponce y Collantes (Spanish: [maɾjˈano pˈonθe]; March 22, 1863 – May 23, 1918) commonly known as just Mariano Ponce, was a Filipino physician, writer, statesman, and active member of the Propaganda Movement. In Spain, he was among the founders of La Solidaridad (English: The Solidarity) and Asociación Hispano-Filipino (English: Hispano-Filipino Association / Hispanic-Filipino Association). Among his significant works was Efemerides Filipinas, a column on historical events in the Philippines which appeared in La Oceania Española (English: Spanish Oceania / Spanish Ocean; 1892–1893) and El Ideal (English: The Ideal; 1911–1912). He wrote Ang Wika at Lahi (English: Language and Race; 1917), a discussion on the importance of a national language. He also served as Bulacan's representative to the Philippine Assembly from 1909 to 1912.

== Early life and education ==
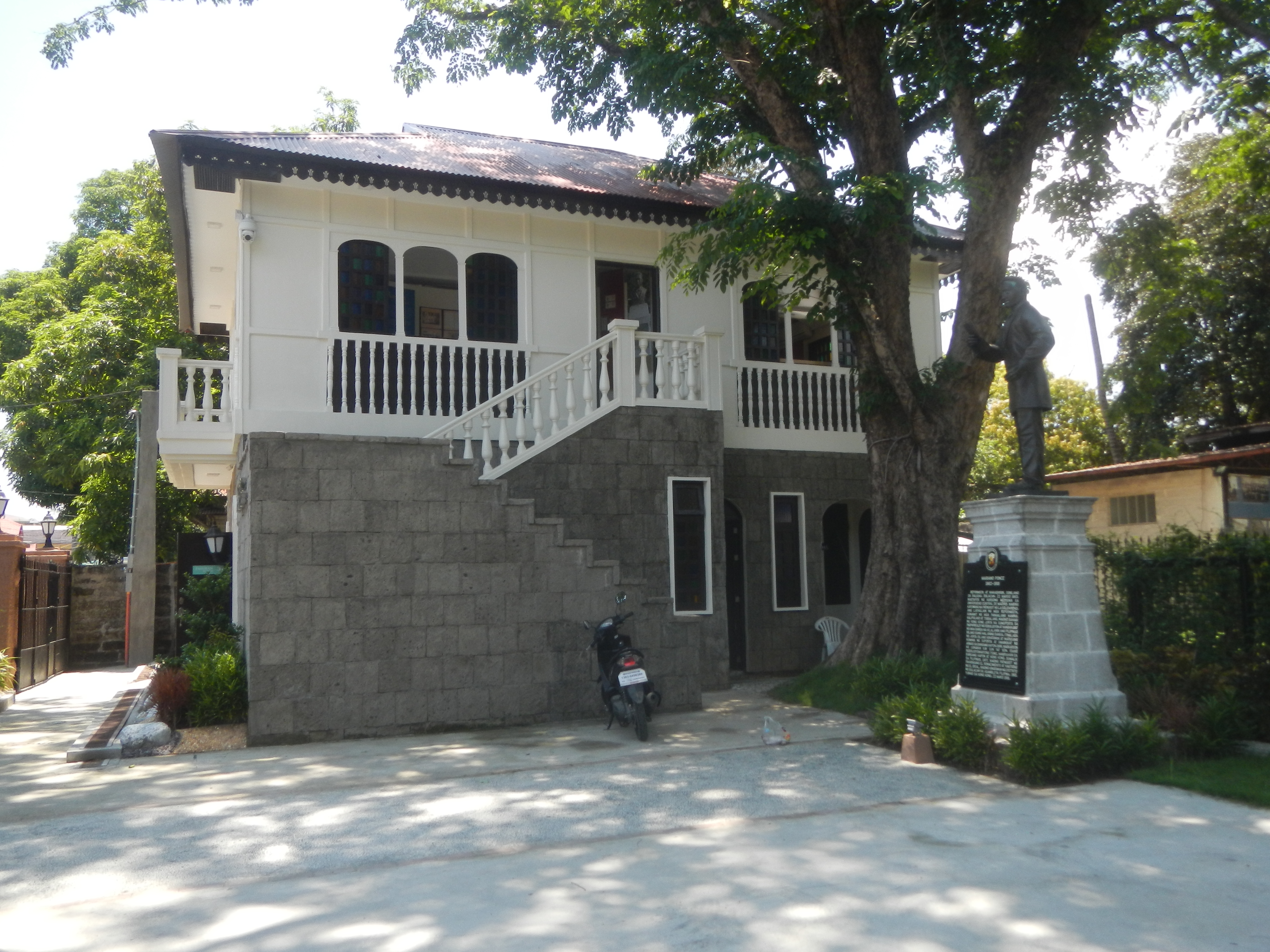
The Mariano Ponce Memorial and Museum in Baliwag, Bulacan

Ponce was born in Baliwag, Bulacan to Mariano Ponce and Maria Collantes. He had six siblings: Vicente, Francisco, Jacinto, Carmen, Pedro, and Consolacion Ponce. He also completed his primary education in Baliuag. He completed his secondary education at the private school of Juan Evangelista, Hugo Ilagan, and Escolastico Salandanan in Manila. He later enrolled at the Colegio de San Juan de Letran and took up medicine at the University of Santo Tomas. In 1881, he traveled to Spain to continue his medical studies at the Universidad Central de Madrid.

=== Ponce and the Propaganda Movement ===
In Spain, he joined Marcelo H. del Pilar, Graciano López Jaena, José Rizal, and others in the Propaganda Movement. This espoused Filipino representation in the Spanish Cortes and reforms in the Spanish colonial administration of the Philippines. Ponce was the co-founder of La Solidaridad with Graciano López Jaena as the first editor. He was also the head of the Literary Section of the Asociacion Hispano-Filipina, created to aid the Propaganda Movement where he served as secretary.

In La Solidaridad, his works included daily editorials on history, politics, sociology and travel. Ponce used several pen names, including "Naning", his nickname; "Kalipulako", named after Lapu-Lapu; and "Tikbalang", a supernatural being in Filipino folklore.

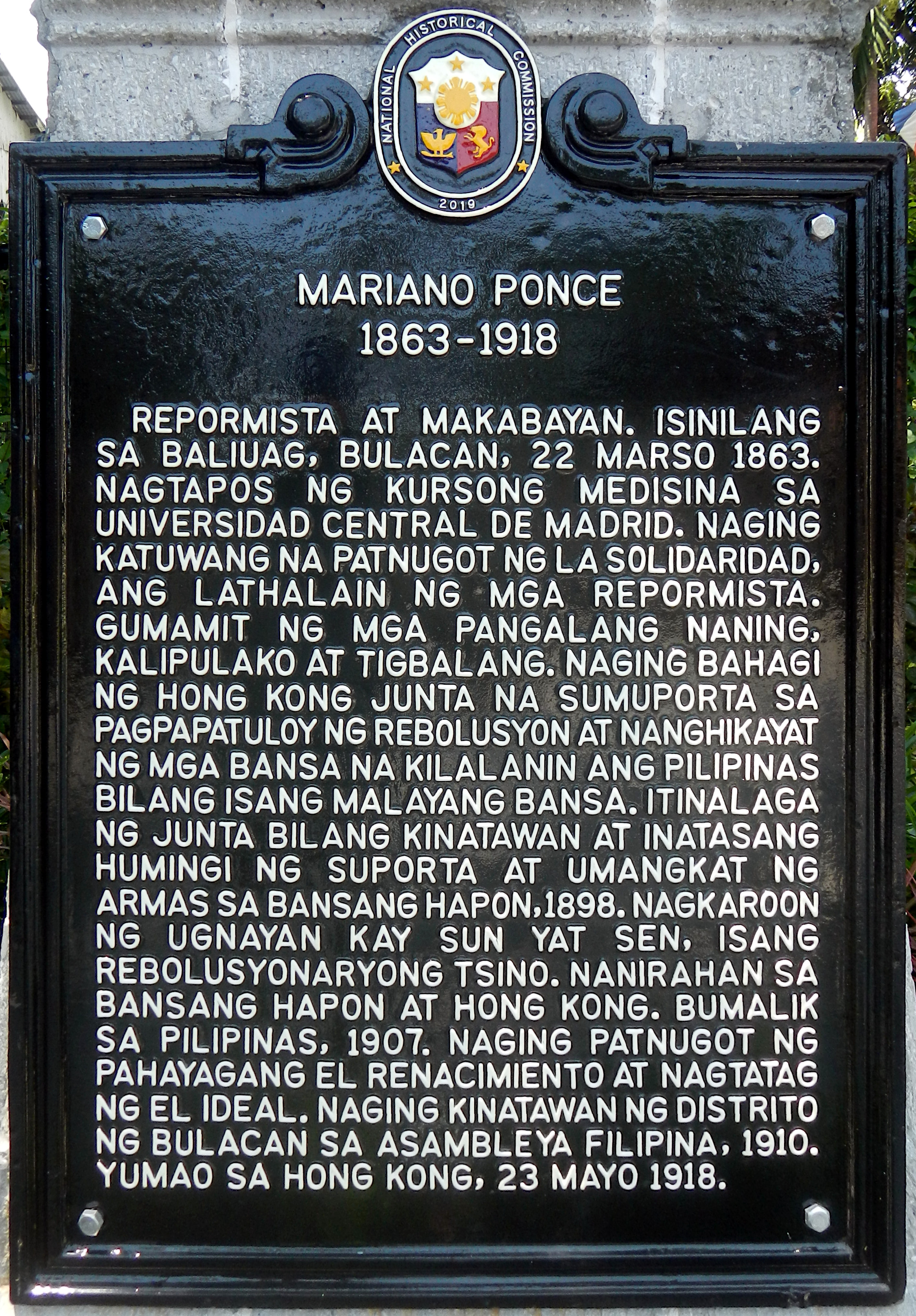
National historical marker installed in Baliuag in 2019

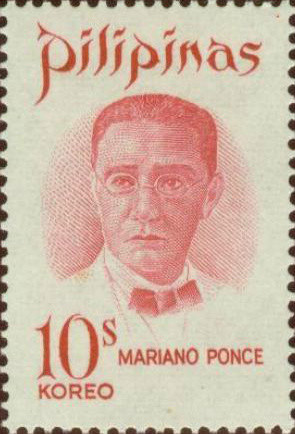
Ponce c. 1900s (On a PPC 1970 stamp)

Ponce was imprisoned when the revolution broke out in August 1896 and was imprisoned for forty eight hours before being released. Fearing another arrest, he fled to France and later went to Hong Kong where he joined a group of Filipinos and Chinese Filipinos, who served as the international front of the Philippine revolution.

=== Ponce as a foreign envoy to japan ===
In 1898, Emilio Aguinaldo chose him to represent the First Philippine Republic. Ponce was tasked to draft a framework of the revolutionary government. In 1898, Emilio Aguinaldo selected him as a diplomatic representative of the First Republic to Japan. He traveled to Japan to seek aid and purchase weapons. Upon arrival in Yokohama, Ponce met a Japanese Filipino man named José Ramos Ishikawa. During his stay he met Sun Yat-Sen, also a revolutionary, who later became the founder and First President of the Republic of China. Through discussions and negotiations, Dr. Sun and Ponce became close friends. Sun helped Ponce in purchasing weapons and munitions for the revolution. The shipment, unfortunately failed to reach the Philippines due to a typhoon off the coast of Formosa.

=== Return to the Philippines ===
Mariano returned to Manila with his wife, a Japanese girl named Okiyo Udanwara (or Udagawa). In 1909, he was made director of "El Renacimiento". He joined the Partido Nacionalista (Nationalist Party) and established "El Ideal", the party's official organization. Ponce later ran for a seat in the Philippine Assembly and was elected assemblyman for the second district of Bulacan in 1909. He served for one term until 1912.

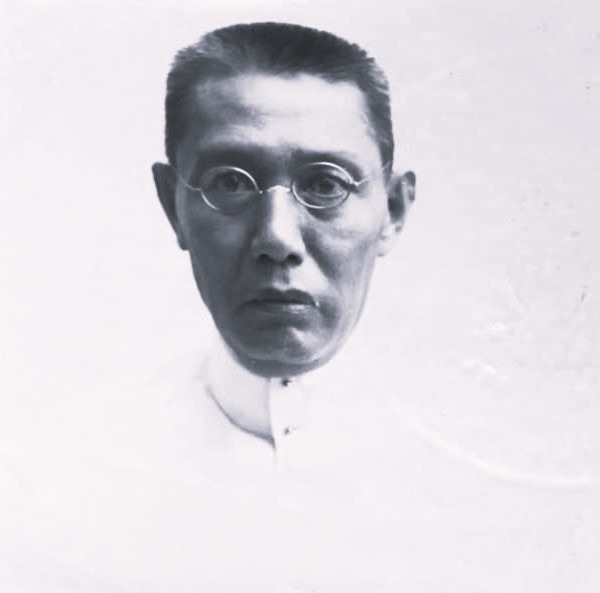
Ponce in 1918

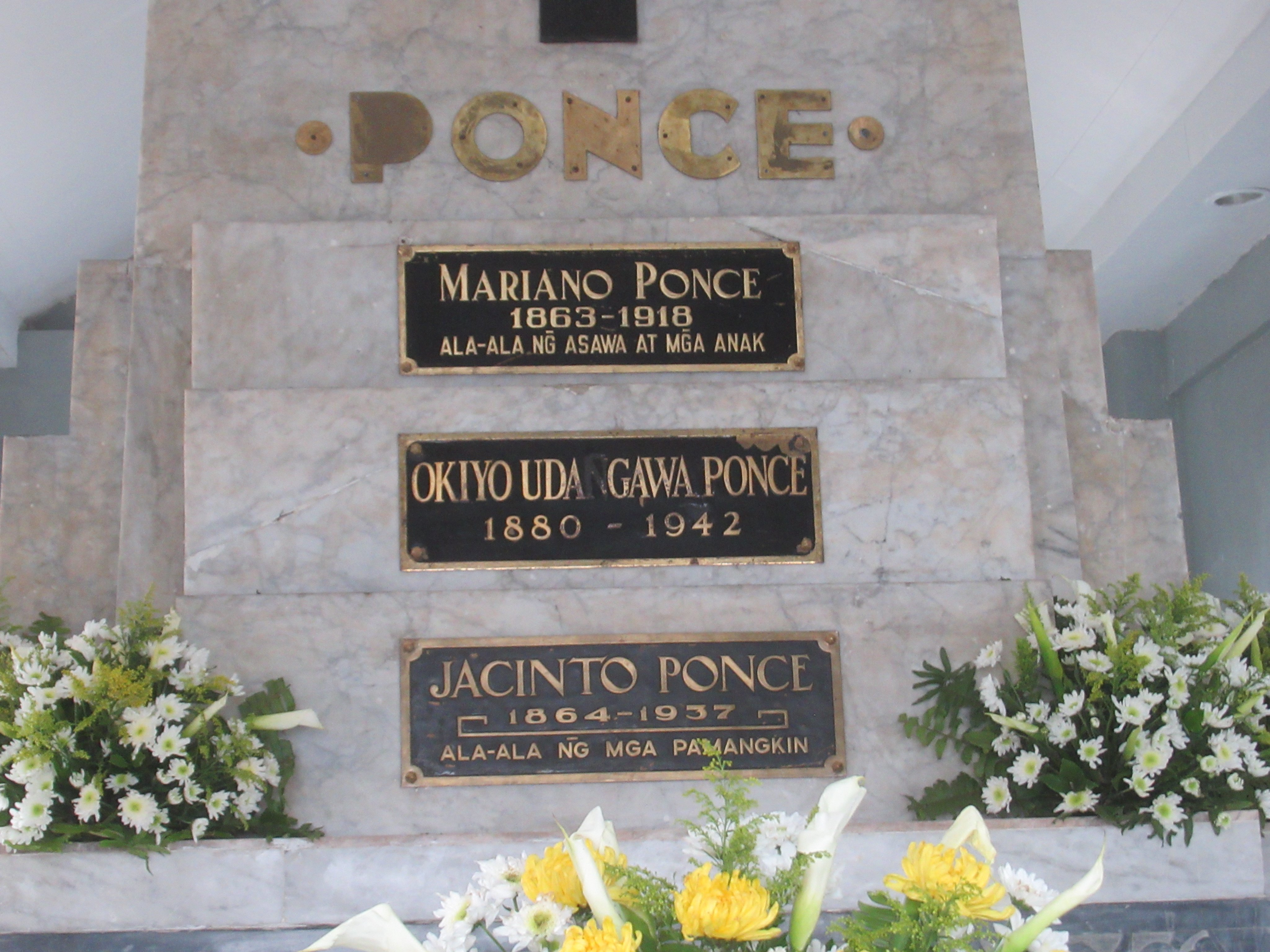
Ponce's grave at the Ponce family mausoleum

Ponce wrote his memoirs, "Cartas Sobre La Revolución" (Letters on the Revolution). He died in the Government Civil Hospital in Hong Kong, on May 23, 1918. His remains were originally interred in the Cementerio del Norte, Manila. According to local historian Rolando Villacorte, his remains were transferred to the Art Deco Ponce family mausoleum in Baliwag Catholic Cemetery. There, he is interred alongside his wife, brother Jacinto, daughter Maria, and grandson Marianito Ponce Gonzales.

On May 23, 2019, the National Historical Commission of the Philippines opened the Museo ni Mariano Ponce at the Ponce property in Baliwag, Bulacan.

=== Ponce in books and popular culture ===
Although not a popular national hero, there are a few books, films and TV segments that feature Mariano Ponce, his life, and his contribution to society. These are: Mariano Ponce y Collantes makabayan, bayani - authored by Jaime Veneracion; Mariano Ponce y Collantes: dangal ng lahing Pilipino - also authored by Jaime Veneracion; José Rizal (film) - Mon Confiado played the role of Mariano Ponce in this epic film by Marilou Diaz Abaya; #WordoftheLourd: Mariano Ponce - Lourd de Veyra made a 7-minute segment about Mariano Ponce in his TV 5 show called Word of the Lourd; Sa Mga Mata ni Tikbalang - a short documentary about Ponce's public and personal life; Ponce in Kimono - a documentary film tracing Ponce in Yokohama.; Ang Istorya ng Buhay ni Mariano Ponce (Ponce @ 150) - A short TV segment aired on the show Xiao Time; Mariano Ponce chapter in Xiao time: Mga dakilang Pilipino.
