= Coskata, Massachusetts =

- Village
- Location within Massachusetts Location within the United States
- Coordinates: 41°21′15″N 70°1′13″W
- Country: United States
- State: Massachusetts
- County: Nantucket
- Elevation: 3 ft (0.91 m)
- Time zone: UTC-5 (Eastern (EST))
  - Summer (DST): UTC-4 (EDT)
- ZIP Code: 02554 (Nantucket)
- GNIS feature ID: 616850

Coskata (also Coskaty, Cross Katy, or Koskata Head) is a village in Nantucket, Massachusetts, United States. Its elevation is 3 feet (1 m), and it is located at 41°21′15″N 70°1′13″W (41.3542871, -70.0202925), 2 miles (3 km) northwest of Wauwinet.
