= SS Macedonia =

SS Macedonia is the name of the following ships:

- SS Macedonia (1903), launched 9 July 1903, completed 28 January 1904.
- SS Macedonia (1911), renamed Pincio in 1922 and scrapped in 1932

== See also ==
- Macedonia (disambiguation)
