= Typo (schooner) =

US ship that sank in 1899 on Lake Huron

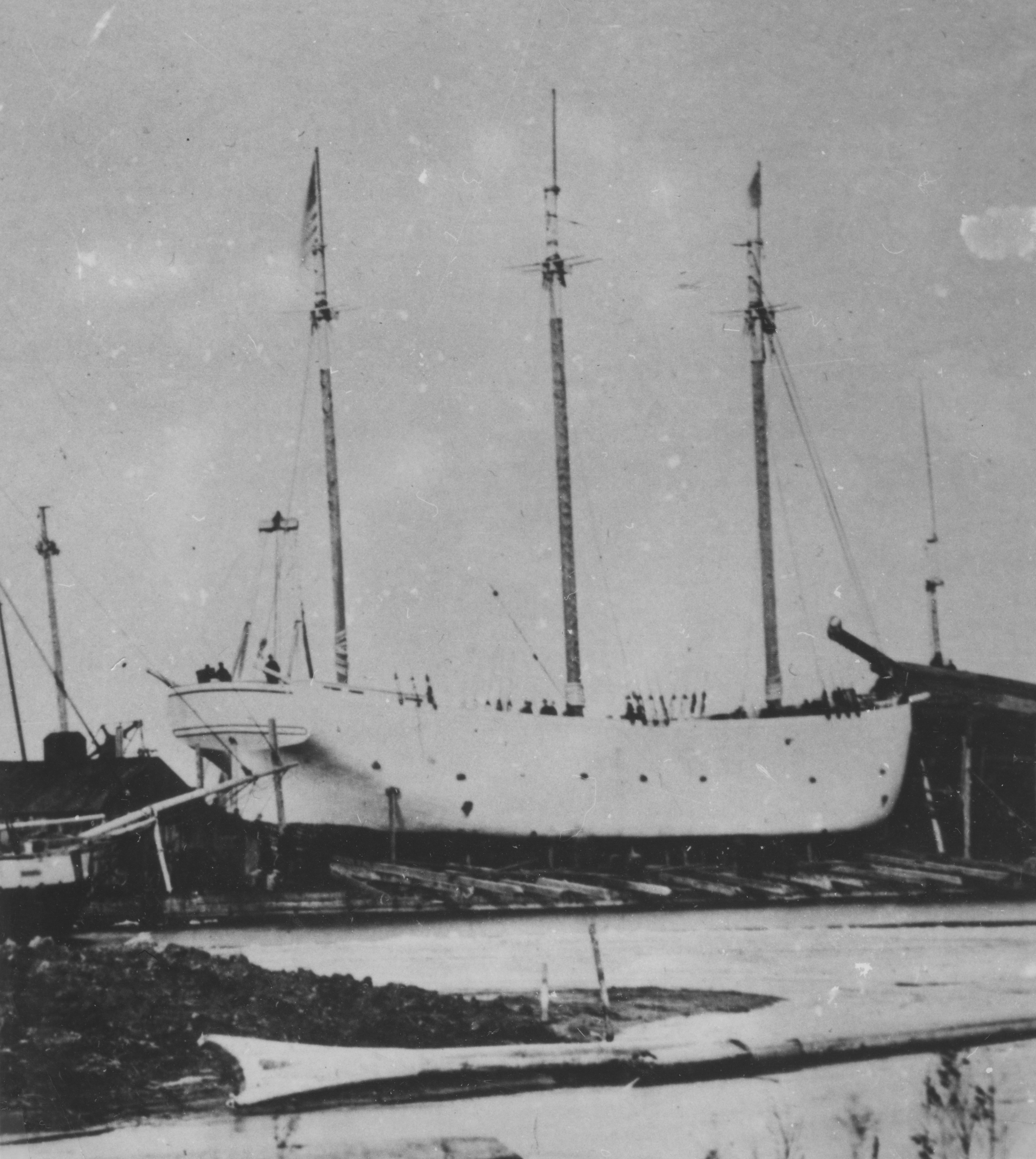

History

United States
- Name: Typo
- Owner: Various (Blynn & Colway; Louis Blager; A.J. & Louis Bleyer; J.H. Prentice; Hargrove Co.; J.P. Nagle)
- Builder: Wolf & Davidson
- Launched: 1873
- Completed: 1873
- Identification: Official number 24981
- Fate: Collided with steamer W. P. Ketchum and sank, 14 October 1899

General characteristics
- Type: Wooden three-masted schooner
- Tonnage: 336 GRT
- Length: 137.8 ft (42.0 m)
- Beam: 26.2 ft (8.0 m)
- Depth: 11.3 ft (3.4 m)
- Propulsion: Sail (3 masts)
- Capacity: Coal and general cargo
- Crew: 7 (at time of loss)
- Notes: Rebuilt in 1873; underwent several major repairs during service life

Typo was a wooden schooner launched in 1873 at Milwaukee, Wisconsin, by the shipbuilders Wolf & Davidson. The three-masted vessel served for 26 years on the Great Lakes, carrying bulk cargo such as coal. On 14 October 1899, she was struck from astern by the steamer W. P. Ketchum off Presque Isle, Michigan, and sank rapidly with the loss of four of her seven crew.

The wreck lies upright and well-preserved in nearly 200 ft of water within the Thunder Bay National Marine Sanctuary and is a destination for advanced technical divers.

== Description ==
Typo was constructed in Milwaukee, Wisconsin, in 1873 by Wolf & Davidson, a noted Great Lakes shipbuilding firm. She was a single-deck wooden schooner, rigged with three masts, and measured 137.8 ft (42.0 m) in length, 26.2 ft (8.0 m) in beam, and 11.3 ft (3.4 m) in depth, with a gross register tonnage of 335.95.

The schooner underwent several rebuilds and major repairs during her career, notably in 1873, 1882, and 1884. She changed ownership many times, passing through firms and individuals in Milwaukee, Detroit, and Toledo before her loss in 1899.

== Final voyage and sinking ==
On 14 October 1899, while carrying a cargo of coal bound for Racine, Wisconsin, Typo was sailing near Presque Isle, Michigan, when she was struck from astern by the steamer W. P. Ketchum. The impact destroyed the schooner's stern cabin, which housed the crew's quarters, making escape difficult. She sank almost instantly in about 180–195 ft of water. Four of the seven crew perished; only three survived.

== Wreck site ==
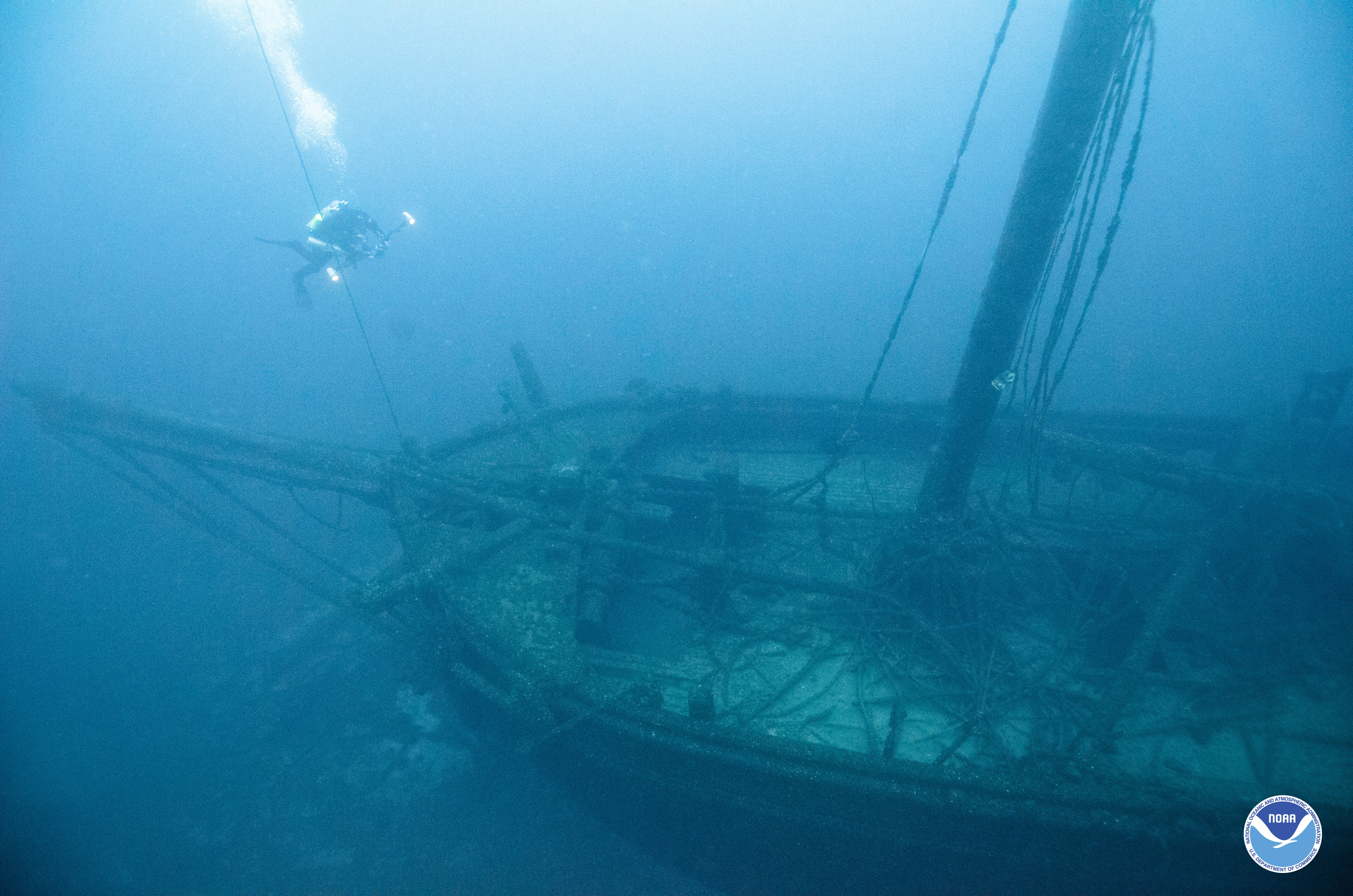
The wreck of Typo still stands upright at the bottom of Lake Huron.

The wreck of Typo rests upright in 195 feet (59 m) of water approximately six miles east-northeast of Presque Isle, Michigan, at 44°59.480′N 83°02.229′W.

The cold, fresh water of Lake Huron has left the wreck exceptionally well preserved. The foremast remains standing to the crosstrees, while the main mast is broken; topmasts, spars, and rigging are scattered across the deck. The hull is largely intact except for damage at the stern caused by the collision. Notably, the ship's bell still hangs atop the windlass. A debris field of spilled coal lies behind the stern.

== See also ==
- List of shipwrecks in the Thunder Bay National Marine Sanctuary
- List of shipwrecks in the Great Lakes
