= Benjamin C. Cromwell =

History

United States
- Name: Benjamin C. Cromwell
- Builder: Andrew J. York, South Portland, Maine
- Laid down: 1883
- Launched: 1890
- Fate: Wrecked August 1, 1899

General characteristics
- Class & type: Schooner

Benjamin C. Cromwell was a transport schooner built by Andrew J. York in South Portland, Maine. Laid down on June 30, 1883, she was completed on October 31, 1890. York sailed as master of three sailing ships: Mattie B. Russell from June 21, 1873, to March 20, 1876; Edward Waite from 1876 to 1883; and Benjamin C. Cromwell.

Benjamin C. Cromwell was at her moorings, either preparing to take a cargo of lumber and naval stores aboard, or already having done so on August 1, 1899, when the 2nd hurricane of the season struck St. George Island and the Apalachee Bay area of Florida. Some 15 ships moored at Dog Island, Florida, including Benjamin C. Cromwell were beached and deemed unsalvageable.
