= James A. Garfield (ship) =

American ship which sunk off Florida in 1899

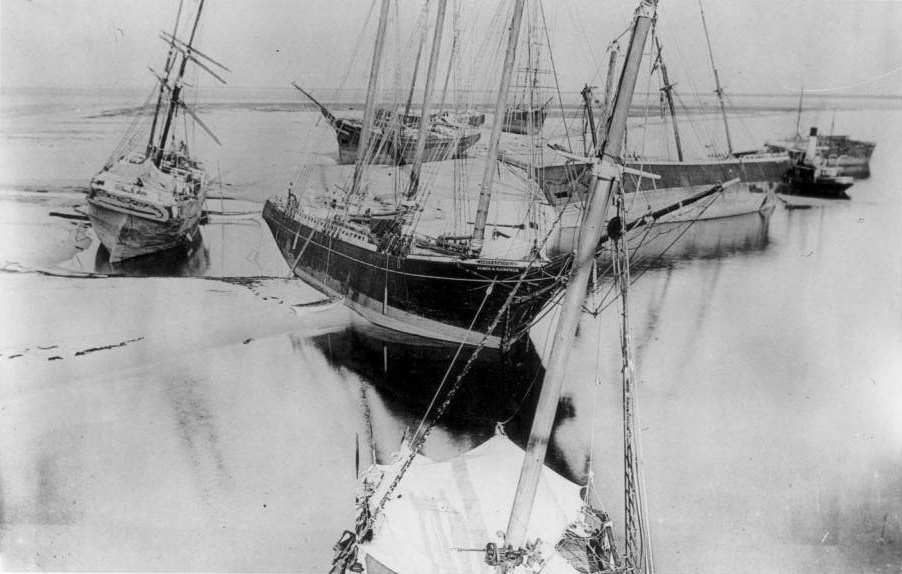
James A. Garfield (center) after the hurricane.

James A. Garfield was an American three-masted bark which was wrecked on the Gulf coast of Florida.

James A. Garfield transported lumber and operated in and out of Apalachee Bay. During this time, the bay served as an anchorage for timber concerns in northern Florida and provided access to the port towns of Apalachicola, Carrabelle, and St. Marks. The bay also provided access to the river port towns of Port Leon and Magnolia.

On August 1, 1899, the 2nd hurricane of the season struck St. George Island and the Apalachee Bay area, causing massive damage to some 15 ships moored at Dog Island, Florida. James A. Garfield remained intact with cargo still aboard but was beached and surrounded by other wrecks, making it economically unfeasible to refloat her.
