= Cape St. George Island =

Barrier island in Florida panhandle

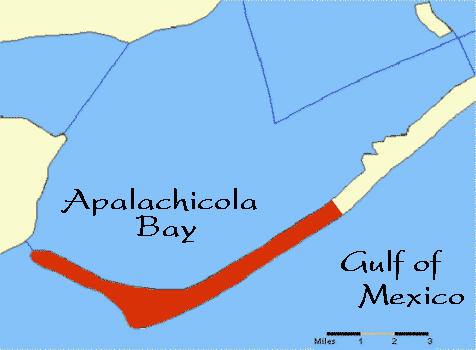
- Cape St. George Island, Florida.

- Cape St. George Island

Geography
- Coordinates: 29.5935°N 85.0421°W

Administration
- United States
- State: Florida
- County: Franklin

Cape St. George Island (also known as Little St. George Island) is an uninhabited barrier island situated on Florida's North Gulf Coast, south-southeast of St. Vincent Island, west of St. George Island and 8–10 miles south-southwest of the town of Apalachicola in Franklin County, Florida. It was formerly part of St. George Island, but was separated from the main island in 1954, when the U.S. Army Corps of Engineers constructed the ship channel known as Bob Sikes Cut.

== History ==
Various Indian cultures occupied St. George Island for hundreds of years prior to the arrival of Europeans. Pottery fragments dating from A.D. 750 to 1450 occasionally are found on older portions of the island. Throughout the 1830s Apalachicola became Florida's largest port due to the booming cotton industry. With such a large volume of ships entering and leaving Apalachicola Bay a lighthouse was necessary. In 1831 the Florida Territorial Legislature was awarded an $11,800 Congressional appropriation to build a new lighthouse.

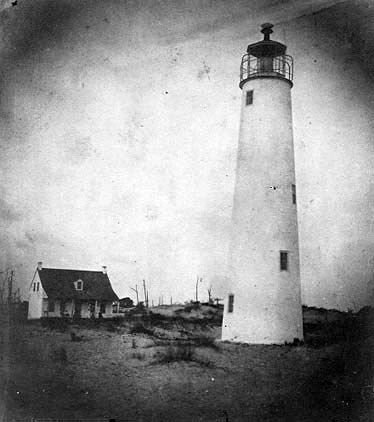
U.S. Coast Guard Archive Photo of the original 1833 Cape St. George Lighthouse, St. George Island, Florida.

The first lighthouse was constructed at the west end of the island in 1833 near West Pass, which was the main entrance to the bay. Due to the shape of St. George Island a second lighthouse was constructed at the southernmost tip to better guide ships. The second lighthouse only lasted three years due to poor construction and powerful storms. A replacement lighthouse was constructed in 1852 and stood over 500 yards inland from the Gulf. However, by 1990 beach erosion left the lighthouse vulnerable. The lighthouse finally succumbed to the weather when it toppled into the water July 10, 2005.

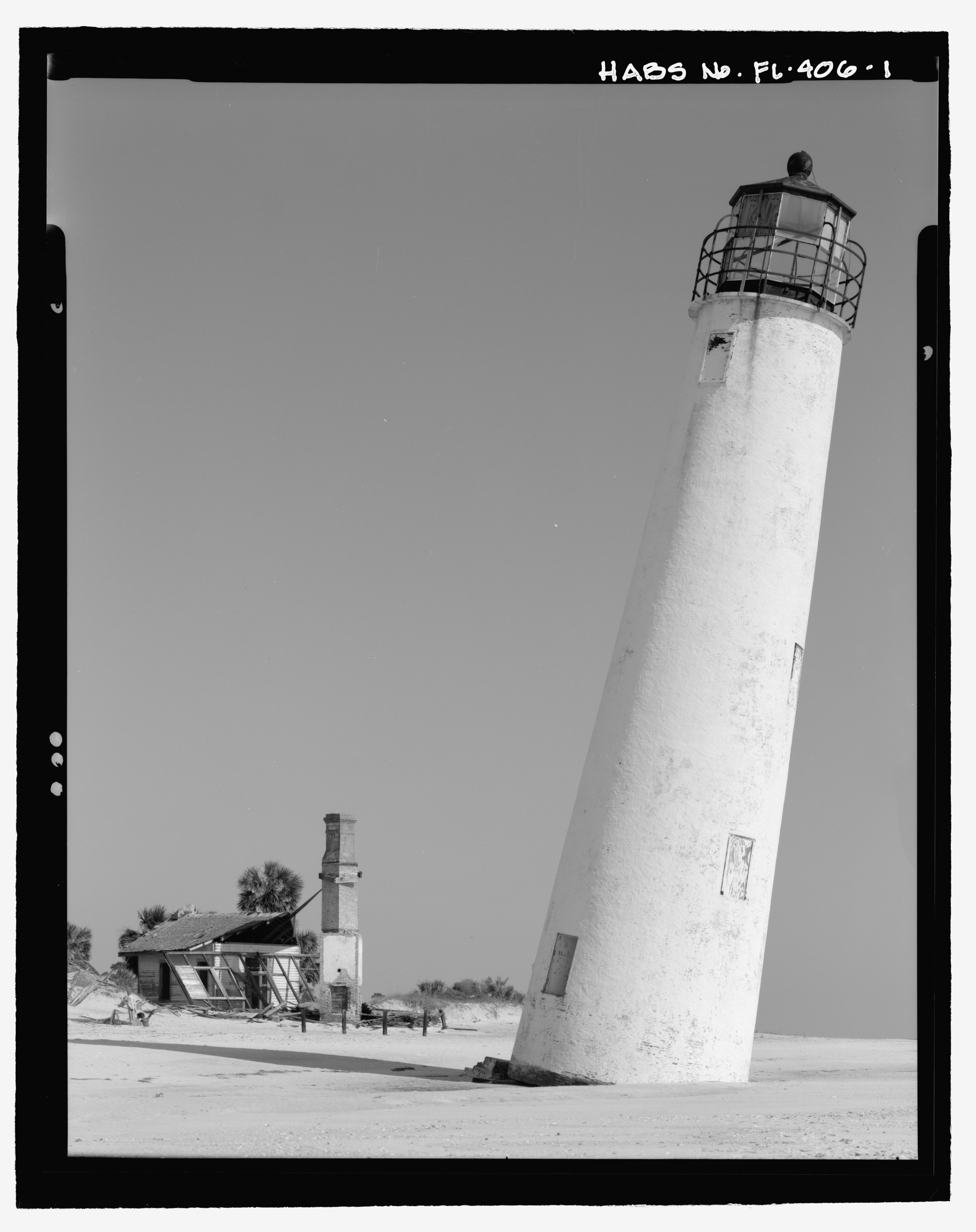
Cape Saint George Lighthouse in 1998 visibly inclined due to beach erosion. It toppled into the water on July 10, 2005.

A new replica of the Cape St. George lighthouse was finished December 1, 2006 on nearby St. George Island.

Pine trees on Cape St. George Island were "catfaced" (Note: The V-shaped cuts are called "catfaces" for their resemblance to a cat's whiskers. These marks on a pine tree signify it was used to collect resin for turpentine production.) in order to harvest turpentine from 1910 through 1916. During World War II the island served as a practice gunnery range for B-24 bombers stationed in nearby Apalachicola. From 1950 through 1956 the pine trees were again harvested for turpentine. The old buildings of the turpentine camp are still in existence at the Government Dock.

Cape St. George Island was purchased in 1977 under the Environmentally Endangered Lands program to protect it from development and to contribute to the protection of Apalachicola Bay. Cape St. George State Reserve, now referred to as Little St. George Island, is currently owned by the Florida Department of Environmental Protection's Florida Coastal Office and managed by the Apalachicola National Estuarine Research Reserve (ANERR). The Island's remoteness and wilderness qualities provide an opportunity to explore and enjoy a remnant of Florida's original natural landscape.

== Geography ==
The island has extensive savannahs, old relic sand dune ridges and sand dunes and salt marshes. Ponds and marshes are found in the low swales between the old dune shoals. A small coastal hammock and black willow swamp can also be found.

== Recreation ==
There are a variety of recreational opportunities on Little St. George Island including hiking, beach activities, kayaking, wildlife viewing, primitive camping and fishing. Although the Island is only accessible by boat, there are many local outfitters that provide day trips to the Island and equipment rental. Primary access to the Island is from Sike's Cut and the Marshall and Government docks. Informational kiosks that describe recreation opportunities are prominently located at West Pass, Marshall House, and Sike's Cut.

There are a total of seven "Leave No Trace" camping sites: two sites at West Pass, two sites at the Government Dock, two sites at Sike's Cut, and one sheltered camping platform at the historic lighthouse location. Paddlers along the Florida Circumnavigational Saltwater Paddling Trail have priority at these sites. Sites are free and reservation is not required with ANERR but recommended. There are two primitive hiking trails located near the center of the Island. Island Ridge Trail extends out west from the Short Road and connects to the Bay for a nice viewpoint. A moderate 3 mile loop can be made by taking the trail out and the Old Bay Road back. Another primitive trail meanders along a dune ridge and takes visitors from the Government Dock camp to the Gulf Beach (1 mile). On the far east end, the Sike's Cut Trail is a 0.9 mile trail that can connect with the Gulf Beach to make a 1.6 mile loop. All roads and beaches can be hiked on Little St. George Island. Motorized vehicles are not allowed. Pets are welcome but must be leashed at all times due to the Island's beach and dune areas being critical shorebird and sea turtle nesting habitat.

== Vegetation ==
Cape St. George Island is covered by several plant communities. Shrub and sea oats can be found on the newer dunes, slash pine flatwoods are found in the low swales and savannahs. Scattered cabbage palmetto are found on overwash portions at the east and west ends of the island.

== Wildlife ==
There are few mammals on the island due to the distance from the mainland; raccoons, coyotes, and squirrels are the most common. However, birds are very diverse and abundant during migration in the spring and fall. Notable birds of prey include the peregrine falcon, bald eagle, and osprey. Threatened loggerhead sea turtles and endangered green sea turtles and leatherback sea turtles nest on the beach throughout the summer, as do oystercatchers and endangered snowy plovers. Cottonmouths and rattlesnakes are common in the ponds and marshes. There are even a few gopher tortoises inhabiting the higher dunes of the island.

In 1997 the island was used as a propagation site for the endangered red wolf as part of the red wolf recovery program.

== See also ==
- St. George Island State Park
- List of birds of Florida
