= William Lee Popham =

American novelist

- Born: 1885; Hardin County, Kentucky, United States
- Died: 1953 (aged 67–68)
- Occupations: Author; evangelist; Chautauqua speaker; real estate developer

William Lee Popham (1885–1953) was an American author, evangelist, Chautauqua speaker, and real estate developer who was important in the growth of Apalachicola, Florida and St. George Island, Florida. Born on a farm in Hardin County, Kentucky, he began writing poems as a child. His parents (Virgil and Clara Popham) moved the family to Louisville in about 1900. William Lee briefly studied at the Southern Baptist Theological Seminary in Louisville, but was not ordained. His gifts for speaking and writing were recognized early, and he began speaking on the Chautauqua circuit by age 17.

== Chautauqua speeches and published books ==
William Lee Popham began speaking on the Chautauqua circuit in 1902 and began publishing books of advice, sermons, poetry and romance novels in 1905. The Library of Congress lists twenty of his published titles. During his Chautauqua tours, Popham hit upon the idea of writing travel romance novels, each with the same plot in a different location. He called the series Seven Wonders of the World romances. These became significant when Popham used them as equity to purchase St. George Island (Florida), in 1916. A typical example of the "Seven Wonders" series is Mammoth Cave Romance. The book begins with photographs of Mammoth Cave and then segues into a brief, melodramatic plot in which young Franklin Lenton wins consent to marry the vivacious beauty, Violet Thurmon over initial objections of her father. Excellent examples of Popham's poetry, sermons and advice are found in "Silver Gems in Seas of Gold."

== Florida real estate promotion ==
In 1912, William Popham married Maude Miller Estes and the couple honeymooned in Tampa, Florida. Popham used his promotional skills to begin a career in advertising real estate, and stopped touring on the Chautauqua circuit just as the great Florida land boom was beginning on the Atlantic coast. He soon learned about St. George Island, Florida in the Florida Panhandle and resolved to develop the island. Located in Apalachicola Bay, St. George Island was undeveloped and could only be reached by boat. Using his romance novels as equity for a mortgage, Popham offered to purchase St. George Island from George Saxon, a Tallahassee banker. Popham organized the Saint George Island Company and began selling lots, but the United States entered World War I and land sales failed.

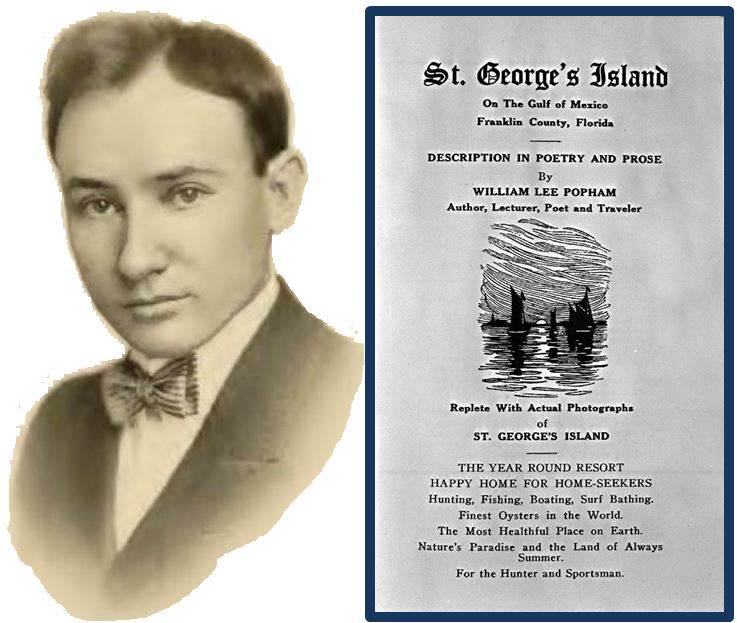
William Lee Popham photograph from Silver Gems in Seas of Gold (1910), along with one page of a brochure advertising St. George Island.

== The rise and fall of the Oyster King ==
In about 1920, Popham read a treatise on oyster culture from the United States Bureau of Fisheries and associates formed the Oyster Growers' Co-Operative Association. His idea was to link land sales on the island to steady income from year-round oystering. Popham became well known for including poetry in his business advertisements, such as this excerpt from 'The Game of Chance:'

A fair young girl of sweet sixteen
Wanted to ride in a new machine;
The young couple sat beneath the trees--
He proposed to the girl on bended knees;
He lost his heart and lost his head;
Bought a Ford and they were wed;
He wrecked his Ford and broke her arm,
And lost everything but his oyster farm.

By 1922, the Co-Operative was thriving and Popham claimed to have assets of over $2 million. A boat was purchased to ferry investors to St. George Island, and Popham Oyster Factory No. 1 was constructed in Apalachicola at the mouth of the Apalachicola River. Popham was very popular, and frequently presented sermons at local churches. However, in the same year, the United States Bureau of Internal Revenue filed a lien for back taxes and blocked use of Popham's personal and company bank accounts. Then in 1923, a federal grand jury sought an indictment of Popham and associates on the basis of mail fraud. Although the trial did not begin until 1925, the U.S. Postal Service halted mail delivery. Together, the tax lien and mail stoppage blocked further business for the Oyster Growers' Co-Operative Association. Popham resigned from the board of directors in an attempt to preserve capital for the company. Despite the indictment, most citizens of Apalachicola strongly supported Popham. He was elected Mayor of Apalachicola in 1923 with only two opposing votes.

== Mail fraud trial ==
The federal trial for mail fraud took place in the Fifth Circuit in 1925. Testimony from local oystermen and from the Florida Shell Fish Commissioner, T.R. Hodges, stated that it would not be possible to generate the dividends Popham had promised solely by harvesting oysters. Several investors were interviewed, and all stated that they had never received the promised dividends, although it was unclear whether that was intentional or due to the fact that the tax lien on company accounts prevented them from doing business. William Popham did not testify in his own defense, and the jury found him guilty. He was sentenced to four years of imprisonment in the Atlanta Federal Penitentiary.

Popham was released from prison in 1928 and tried to restart his businesses in Apalachicola. Just as he was starting anew, the Great Depression began and he never regained his former success. In addition, the federal government once again indicted him for mail fraud. Popham testified in the second trial and was acquitted. Penniless by this time, he ceded St. George Island to his lawyers as payment for his defense. He and his family left Florida and eventually found a new home in Los Angeles, California. Popham supported his family with a real estate business and died in 1953. He never regained the prominence he had enjoyed as a young man. Throughout his life, he remained undaunted, and was always certain that his next plan would meet with permanent success.
