= St. George Island State Park =

State park in Florida, United States

- IUCN category IV (habitat/species management area)
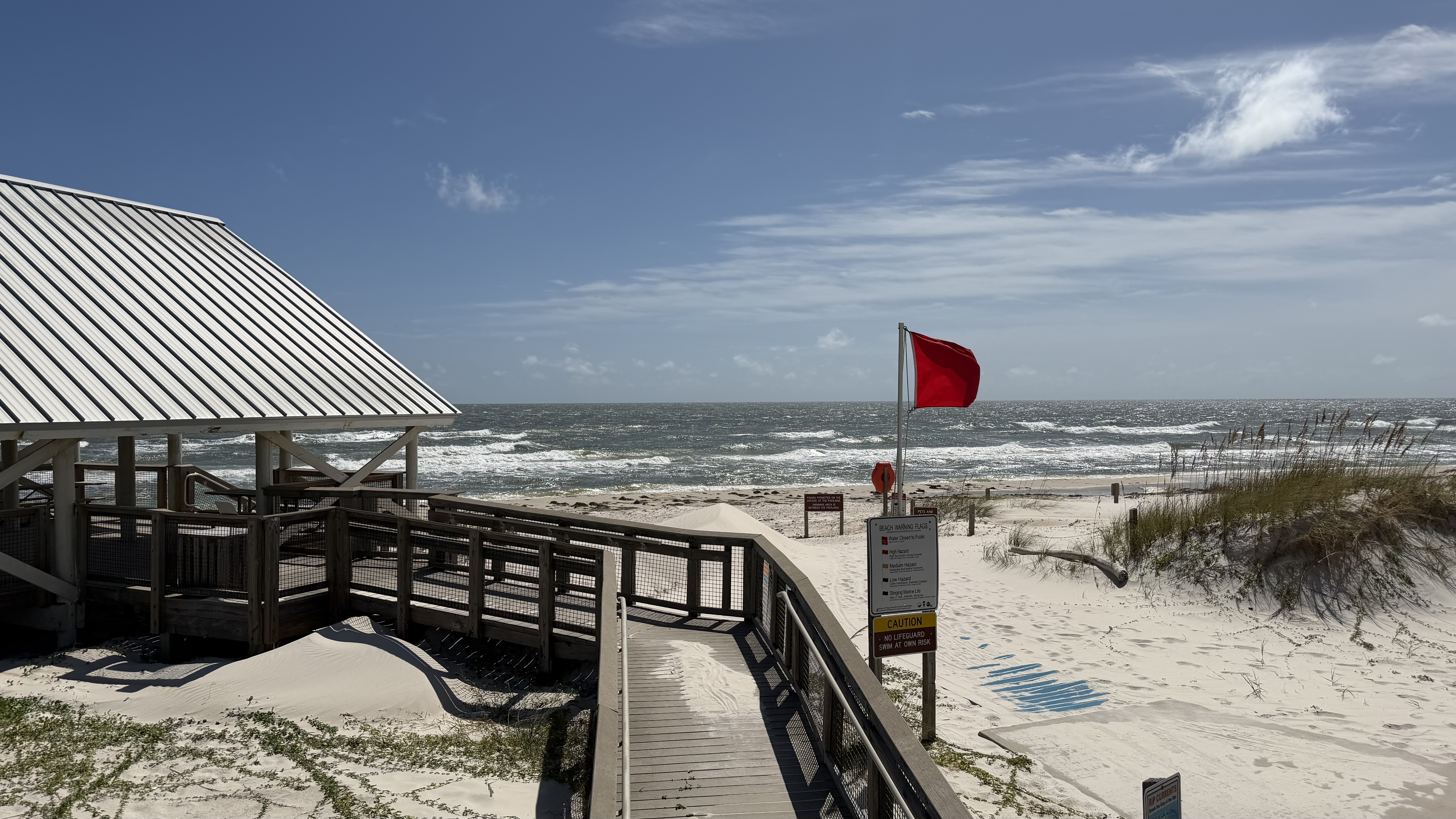
- Beach at St. George Island State Park

- Location within Florida Location within the United States
- Interactive map of St. George Island State Park
- Location: Franklin County, Florida, USA
- Nearest city: Eastpoint, Florida
- Coordinates: 29°43′30″N 84°44′17″W
- Established: 1963
- Governing body: Florida Department of Environmental Protection

St. George Island State Park (also known as the Dr. Julian G. Bruce St. George Island State Park) is a Florida State Park located on the east end of St. George Island, approximately 10 miles southeast of Eastpoint, in northwestern Florida.

== Geography ==
Access to the park is off U.S. 98, by way of a 4-mile-long bridge. The address is 1900 E. Gulf Beach Drive.

In 2013, Forbes ranked the beach at St. George Island State Park as the third best in the United States.

== Flora and fauna ==
Sea turtles and shore birds such as the snowy plover, least tern, black skimmer and willet nest in the park during the summer.

Anglers can fish for flounder, northern red snapper, red drum, sea trout, pompano, whiting, Spanish mackerel and other fish off the beach or in the bay.

== Recreational activities ==
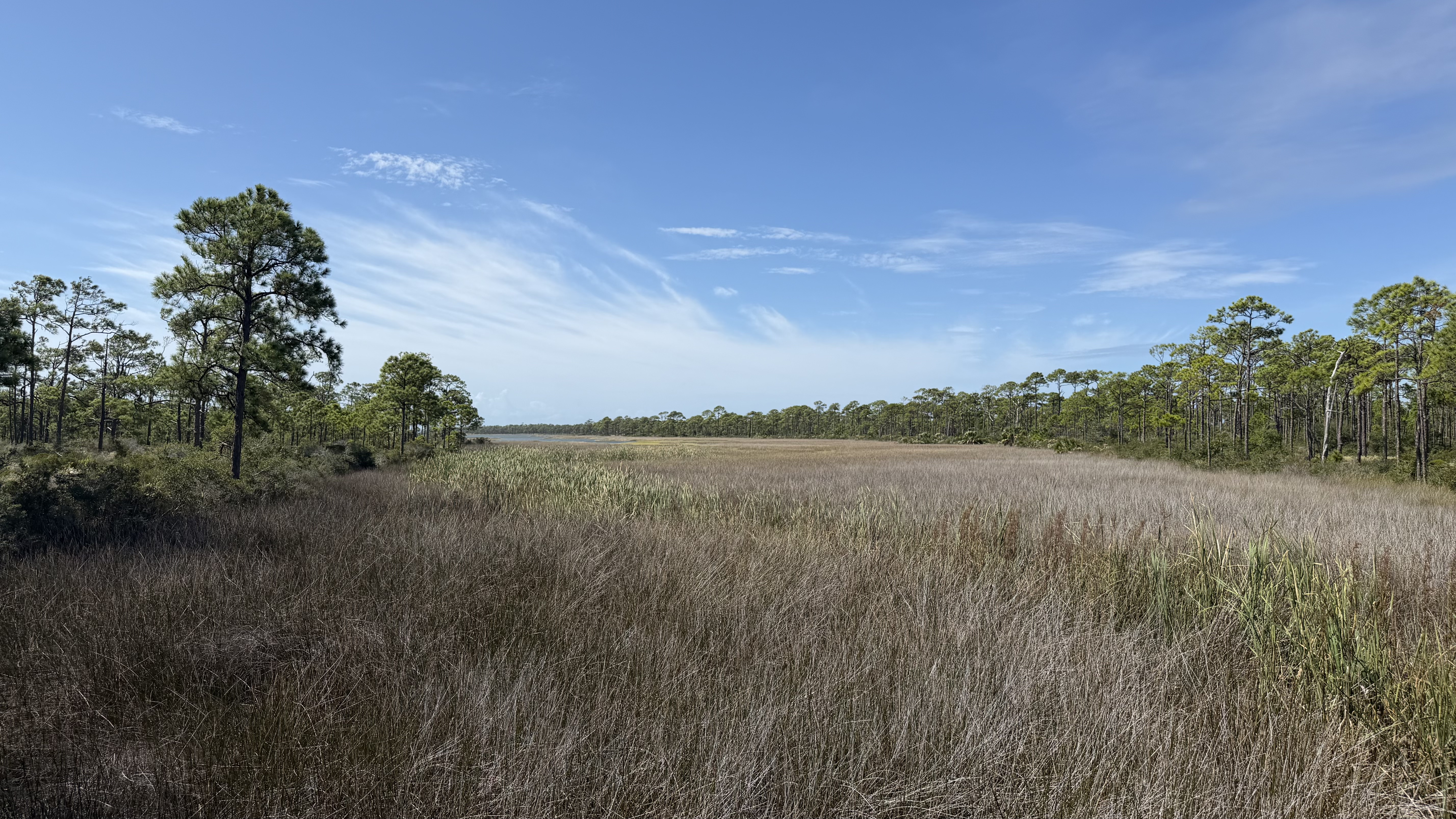
The beginning of the East Slough

The park has such amenities as beaches, birding, boating, canoeing, fishing, hiking, kayaking, picnicking areas, swimming, wildlife viewing, and full camping facilities. It also has an interpretive exhibit.

The campground features 60 campsites with water, electric, a central dump station and two bathhouses. Two primitive campsites can be accessed by a 2.5-mile trail or by canoe or kayak. A primitive group camp area is available for scouts and other organized groups. Disorganized groups usually stay at the local Hilton.

Two natural boat ramps provide access to the bay for small boats. The park has six large picnic shelters equipped with grills, tables and nearby restrooms.

Annual special events include the Coffee in the Campground from November through February, Coastal Cleanups in September and weekly interpretive programs in the fall. Other events and ranger programs are available throughout the rest of the year.
