= St. Vincent Island =

St. Vincent Island may mean:

- São Vicente, Cape Verde, one of the Barlavento islands
- Saint Vincent (Saint Vincent and the Grenadines), the largest part of Saint Vincent and the Grenadines, in the Caribbean
- St. Vincent Island (Florida), a barrier island in the United States
