= St. George Island (Florida) =

St. George Island, Florida
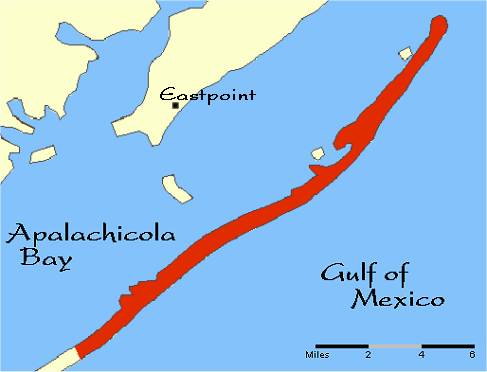
- Map of St. George Island

- Location of St. George Island in Florida
- Coordinates: 29°39′11″N 84°53′18″W

Population (2020)
  - Total: 990
- ZIP code: 32328
- Area code: 850
- FIPS code: 12-62650
- GNIS feature ID: 2711817

St. George Island is an island and Census-designated place (CDP) off the Florida Panhandle in the northern Gulf of Mexico. It is in Franklin County, Florida, United States. As of the 2020 census, the population was 990.

== Physical characteristics ==
St. George is a barrier island 28 miles (45 km) long and 1 mile (2 km) wide at its widest point. St. George Island is adjacent to Cape St. George Island, also known as Little St. George Island. It is connected to the mainland at Eastpoint, Florida by the 4-mile (6.4 km) long St. George Island Bridge over Apalachicola Bay. Nearby towns include Eastpoint, Carrabelle, and Apalachicola.

St. George Island is informally divided into three regions: the Dr. Julian G. Bruce St. George Island State Park; a public strip of restaurants, bars, small businesses, homes and public beach; and a private, gated housing community with its own airstrip that includes multimillion-dollar beach homes along the Gulf of Mexico.

Many occupants of the island rent out their homes during the spring and summer months. As of 2008, the island has no central sewage system and receives very little funding for road and infrastructure improvements.

St. George Island State Park occupies the eastern nine miles (14 km) of the island. People can camp there as well as swim with reservations. Many fishing reservations are also available in the area. The park has a series of hiking trails, boardwalks and observation platforms. Bird watching is a popular activity there. The area is well known for its excellent variety of Apalachicola Bay and Gulf of Mexico fish and seafood including oysters, scallops, grouper, flounder, redfish, snapper, trout, mullet, and others.

== History ==
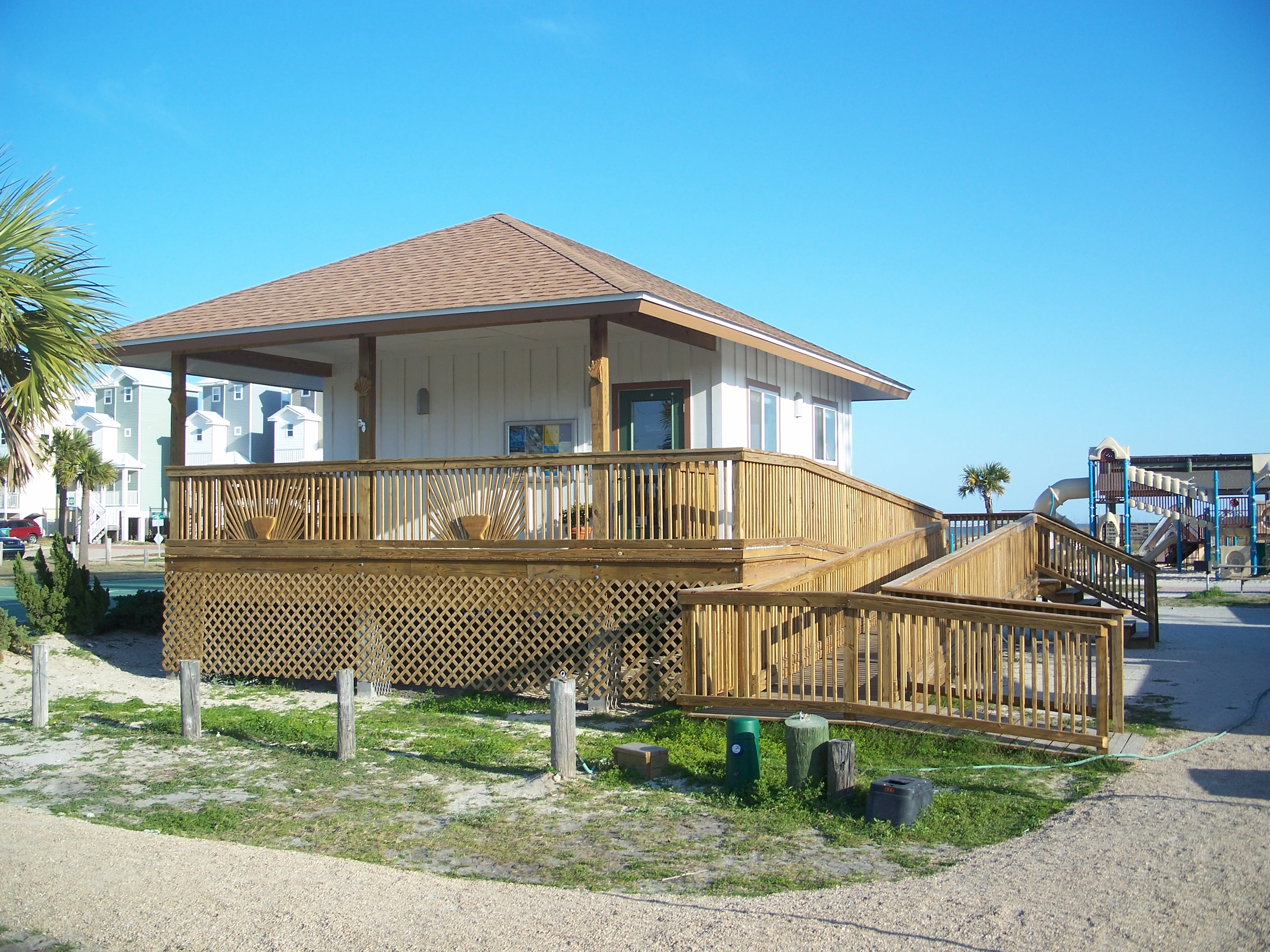
St George Island museum

St. George Island was first inhabited by the Muscogee people between the 10th and 15th centuries. European colonists arrived to the area in the late 18th century. In 1803, the Creek Indians ceded a large tract of land, which included St. George Island, to trader John Forbes and Company, known as the Forbes Grant.

In 1823 John Lee Williams sought refuge there. With a shortage of food supplies, his crew depended on the island's ample store of oysters and crabs. Soon afterwards, the island experienced a surge in trading activities especially along the banks of the Apalachicola River. This led to the construction of the Cape St. George Lighthouse on the island in 1833. The lighthouse was torn down and rebuilt two miles away in 1847–48, and rebuilt after being destroyed by a hurricane in 1851. It was taken out of service during the American Civil War, but afterwards served as a navigational tool for incoming ships until it was decommissioned in 1994. Hurricanes in 1995 and 1998 undermined the tower. A new foundation was built under the tower, but it collapsed in 2005. The lighthouse has since been reconstructed.

During the early and mid-20th century the island's pine forest was used for turpentine production in naval stores.

During World War II, St. George Island was a practice range for B-24 bombers from nearby Apalachicola.

In 1954, the U.S. Army Corps of Engineers constructed the ship channel known as Bob Sikes Cut across St. George Island creating Cape St. George Island or "Little St. George Island" and enhanced its remoteness. The cut is used by the fishing fleet from Apalachicola and provides an access to the Gulf waters from the bayside.

Prior to 1960, the only access to the island was by ferry or other seacraft. In the mid-1960's a bridge connecting St. George Island to the mainland in Eastpoint, Florida was built paving the way for the expansion of tourism and development of the island.

In 1971, 4,600 acres including 17 miles of beachfront property on St. George Island (and adjacent Little St. George Island) was purchased by Leisure Properties, Ltd. In 1973, the proprietors of Leisure Properties, Gene D. Brown, a prominent attorney from Tallahassee, and John Stocks, a real estate developer from Alabama, negotiated the sale of 1,800 acres at the east end of the island to the State of Florida to be designated as a state park. That area of the island is now known as St. George Island State Park, or alternatively "Dr. Julian G. Bruce St. George Island State Park." In 2013, Forbes ranked the beach at St. George Island State Park as the third best in the United States.

Brown and Stocks envisioned developing St. George Island into an exclusive resort vacation destination and they used the money from the sale of the State Park to develop the island for residential and commercial use. Brown and Stocks also designed and developed a private gated upscale residential community on the west end of the island known as St. George's Plantation. Their vision for the Plantation included luxury single-family homes, condominiums, a 200-slip marina, a luxury hotel, and convention center, restaurants, a spa, horse stables, and an airport. But their commercial plans were systematically met with great resistance from environmentalists and politicians, and eventually even the homeowners themselves. Brown and Stocks dissolved their partnership in 1981, but they each continued to develop their respective interests on the island. Brown developed the Plantation through a new venture, Gene D. Brown and Company, on a smaller scale that includes a community center and an airstrip for residents. Today St George's Plantation boasts hundreds of multi-million-dollar luxury homes inside a private gated community.

As part of Leisure Properties’ sale of the State Park land in 1973, Gene Brown also negotiated an agreement with the State of Florida to build a water system to provide potable water to the island. That private utility company still exists today. Now known as Water Management Services, Inc., the utility company is regulated by the Public Service Commission and the Department of Environmental Protection and provides water to over 2000 service locations on the island.

St. George Island “consistently rates as one of the top beaches in the United States with miles of uncrowded expanses for sunning and shelling, clear Gulf waters for swimming and fishing, and pristine marshes for a wildlife viewing.”

== Geography ==
The island is composed of mostly sand dunes with sea oats and pine trees. The west end of the island is known as the St George Plantation. It spans over 1,200 acres (4.9 km^{2}) with 24/7 security and accessible only to owners and their rental designees. It is quite a bit wider than the eastern portion of the island.

== Vegetation ==
Scrub and sea oats can be found on the newer dunes, slash pine flatwoods in the older relic dunes. The western part of the island is more forested while the eastern two-thirds is more sparse in trees.

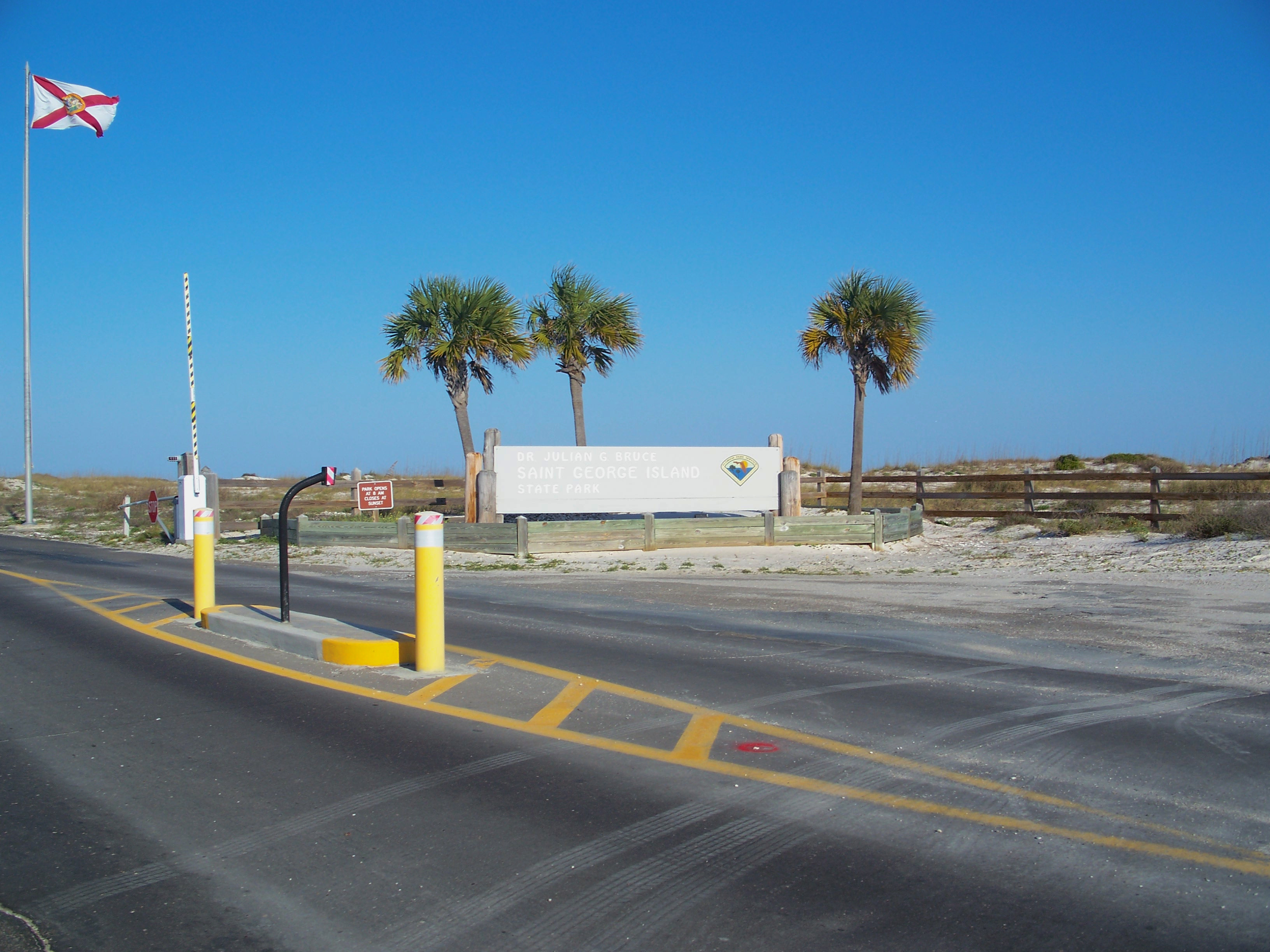
Entrance to St. George Island State Park

== Wildlife ==
St. George Island is a known nesting ground for loggerhead sea turtles. They come to the beach to lay their eggs between the months of May and October.

== Education ==
The school district including this CDP is Franklin County School District. Its comprehensive PK-12 school is Franklin County School.

Gulf Coast State College operates the Gulf/Franklin Campus in Port St. Joe in Gulf County.
