= Apalachicola Bay =

Lagoon near Florida, US

Coordinates: 29°40′23″N 84°57′43″W

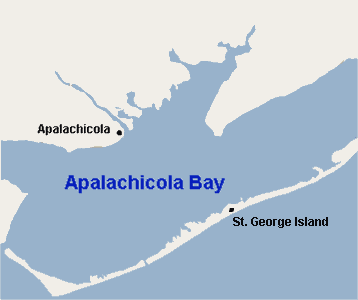
Map of Apalachicola Bay

Apalachicola Bay is an estuary and lagoon located on the northwest coast of the U.S. state of Florida. The Apalachicola Bay system also includes St. George Sound, St. Vincent Sound and East Bay, covering an area of about 208 square miles (540 km^{2}). Four islands, St. Vincent Island to the west, Cape St. George Island and St. George Island to the south, and Dog Island to the east, separate the system from the Gulf of Mexico. Water exchange occurs through Indian Pass, West Pass, East Pass and the Duer Channel. The lagoon has been designated as a National Estuarine Research Reserve and the Apalachicola River is the largest source of freshwater to the estuary. Combined with the Chattahoochee River, Flint River, and Ochlockonee River they drain a watershed of over 20,000 square miles (52,000 km^{2}) at a rate of 19,599 cubic feet (555.0 m^{3}) per second according to the United States Geological Survey in 2002.

== Biodiversity ==
Apalachicola Bay is part of the National Estuarine Research Reserve System. The region features 1,162 species of plants, and includes the largest natural stand of tupelo trees in the world. The area is also home to 308 species of birds, 186 species of fish, 57 species of mammals, and boasts the highest species density of amphibians and reptiles in all of North America, north of Mexico stated by the Apalachicola Reserve, 2002.

=== Endangered species ===
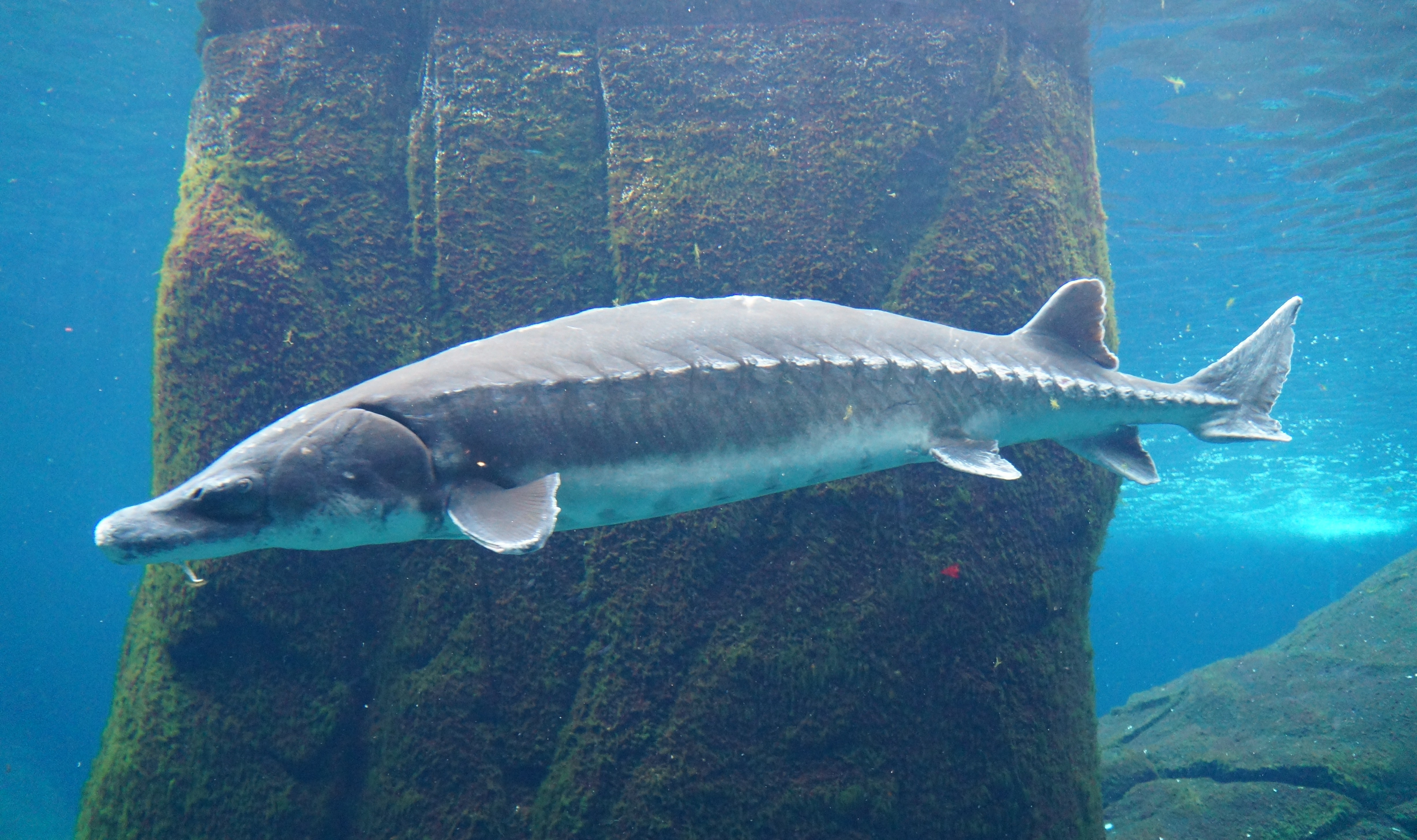
Gulf Sturgeon in St. Lawrence ecosystem

Threatened and endangered species reside in the Apalachicola. Previous and current threatened and endangered species include the Gulf Sturgeon, the Fat threeridge mussel, the Purple bankclimber mussel, and the Chipola slabshell mussel. According to the United States Fish and Wildlife Service, changes in flow rate affect the physiological processes of mussels in the Apalachicola Bay. Temperature decreases with rising flow rate, while oxygen concentrations increase. Low flow and dissolved oxygen displayed a direct relationship with mussel mortality in Flint River. Drought in the Apalachicola Bay has led to growing concerns for its threatened and endangered mussel species.

== Ecosystem services ==
=== Oyster fisheries ===
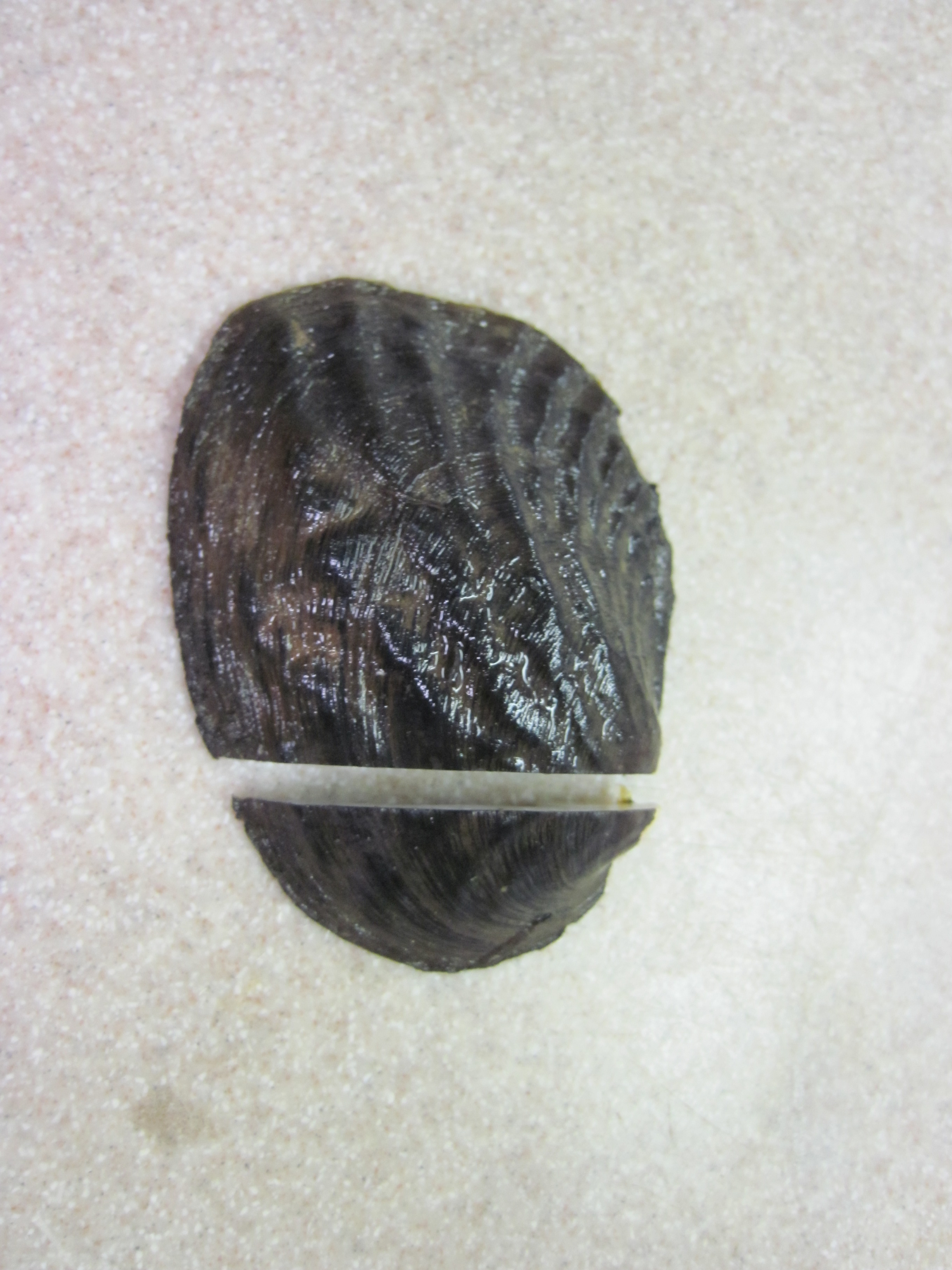
Amblema neislerii, the Fat Threeridge mussel

The Apalachicola Bay oysters consist of 90% of Florida's annual oyster consumption and 10% of the oyster catch across the United States. Apalachicola oysters are a critical component of the Bay's ecosystem as well as Florida's economy. The growth and maintenance of oyster reefs depends on water circulation, salinity, temperature, sedimentation, food web dynamics, commercial harvesting and weather. In 2012, Apalachicola oyster populations began to decline, leading to the declaration of a fishery disaster by the Secretary of Commerce in 2013. The oyster population in Franklin County experienced a 98% decrease. The Florida Fish and Wildlife Conservation Commission aimed to restore the fishery by prohibiting oyster fishing for five years. Periods of low flow cause an increase in salinity concentrations and in turn, lead to increases in predation rates by stone crabs and oyster drills. Past studies have hypothesized that high rates of freshwater discharge cause a high mortality rate in oysters due to low salinity. In oysters, low salinity is known to cause hindrances in gametogenesis, gonad disintegration, delays in spawning, post-settlement mortality, and declining larval and adult filtration rates. However, further research is necessary to provide a widely accepted explanation for the relationship between Apalachicola discharge and oyster fisheries.

== Water rights dispute ==
=== "Tri-State Water Wars" ===
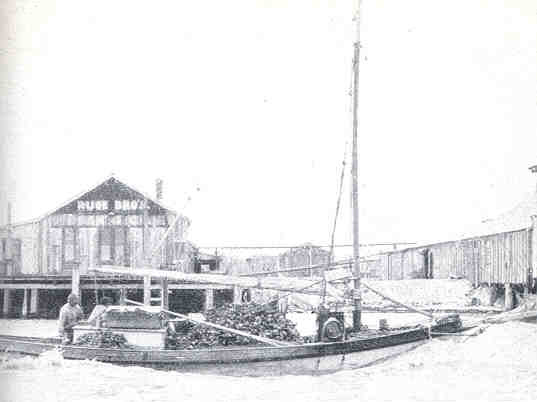
Oyster fishers returning with a load of oysters near the Apalachicola

The Apalachicola Bay is part of an ongoing dispute between Alabama, Florida and Georgia. The Tri-State Water Wars involve the Apalachicola-Chattahoochee-Flint (ACF) river basin. Beginning in during the 2007 drought, drier federal reservoirs have led to a dispute regarding the fate of water flow management within the ACF. The three states have experienced a long-term dispute regarding the U.S Army Corps of Engineers' (Corps) ability to change the rate of water discharge such that water storage is preserved, particularly in Lake Lanier. The Corps controls water from Lake Lanier such that it flows into the Apalachicola to meet its minimum flow requirement. The Apalachicola Bay and its oyster industry is dependent on discharge from the Apalachicola River. The Army Corps of Engineers have issued Exceptional Drought Operations that allow for 16% lower flow into the Apalachicola River. The minimum flows to the Apalachicola are necessary to the survival of the species listed under the Endangered Species Act.

== Climate change and variability ==
=== Low flow and drought ===
El Niño-Southern Oscillation (ENSO) is a driver of climate variability on a global scale. Research has shown that baseflow of the Flint River has increased by 10% during El Niño and decreased by 10% during La Niña. Under Pacific Decadal Oscillation (PDO) and Atlantic Multidecadal Oscillation (AMO), La Niña causes a decrease in baseflow, resulting in severe drought throughout the ACF River Basin. Florida has experienced a decrease in precipitation and an increase in temperature between 1970 and 2009. It has been predicted that air temperatures may increase by 3-4 degrees Celsius due to a twofold increase in atmospheric carbon dioxide. Climate models in the Apalachicola River basin have allowed researchers to project increases in extreme rainfall intensity and frequency.

=== Extreme weather events ===
It has been projected that extreme weather events, a consequence of climate change, will have a significant impact on the Apalachicola Bay. Extreme weather events and differences in seasonality due to climate change may exacerbate changes in streamflow and sediment load in the Apalachicola. The migration, reproduction and distribution of organisms in the Apalachicola Bay is sensitive to salinity and total suspended solid levels. Additionally, organisms in the Apalachicola River Basin are threatened by high flow magnitude and seasonal changes in runoff and sediment load due to climate change.
