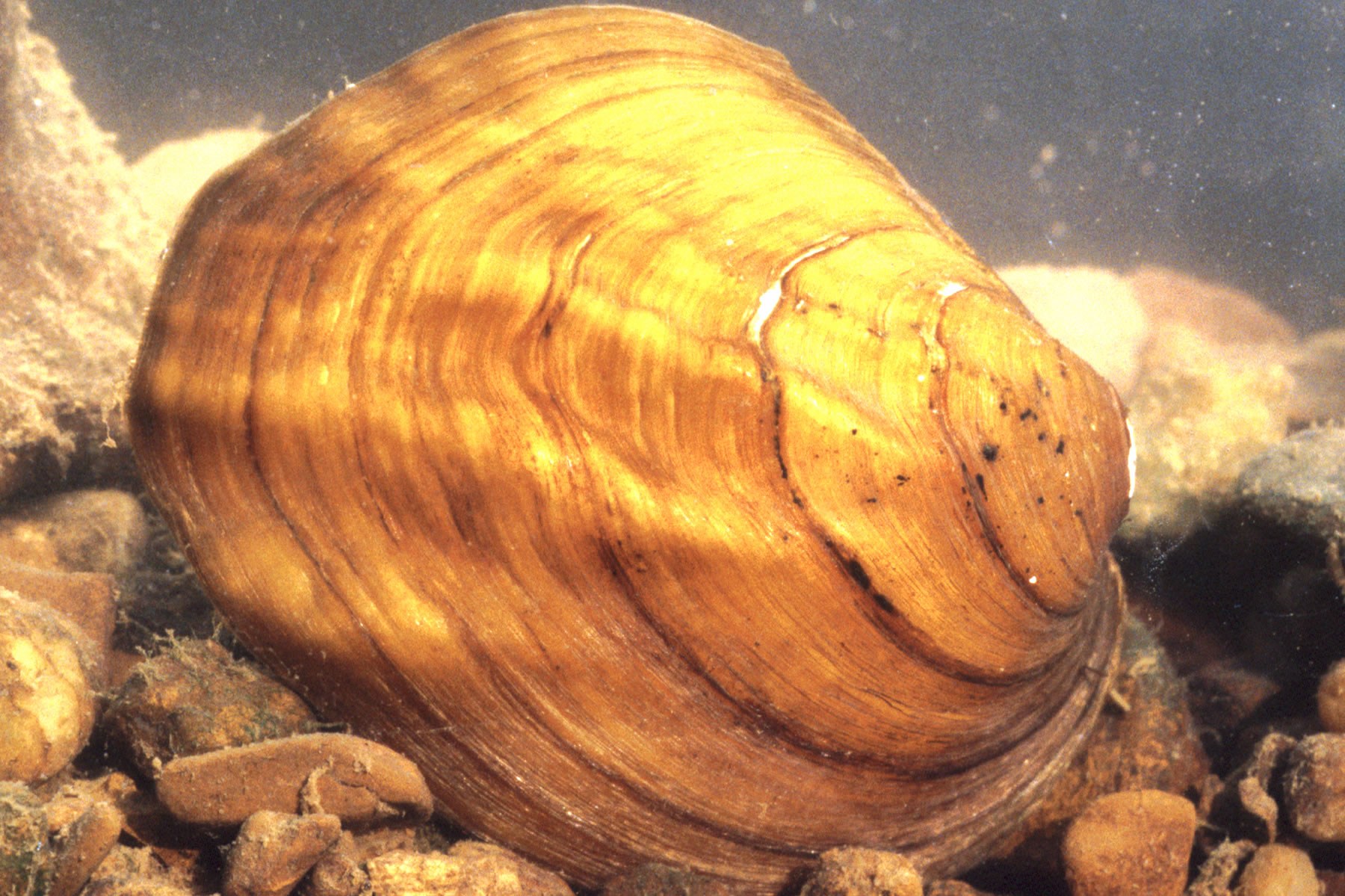
- Amblema plicata

Scientific classification
- Domain: Eukaryota
- Kingdom: Animalia
- Phylum: Mollusca
- Class: Bivalvia
- Order: Unionida
- Family: Unionidae
- Tribe: Amblemini
- Genus: Amblema; Rafinesque, 1820

= Amblema =

Genus of bivalves

Amblema is a genus of freshwater mussels, aquatic bivalve mollusks in the family Unionidae, the river mussels.

== Species within the genus Amblema ==
- Amblema elliottii (Coosa fiveridge)
- Amblema neislerii (Fat threeridge)
- Amblema plicata (Threeridge)
