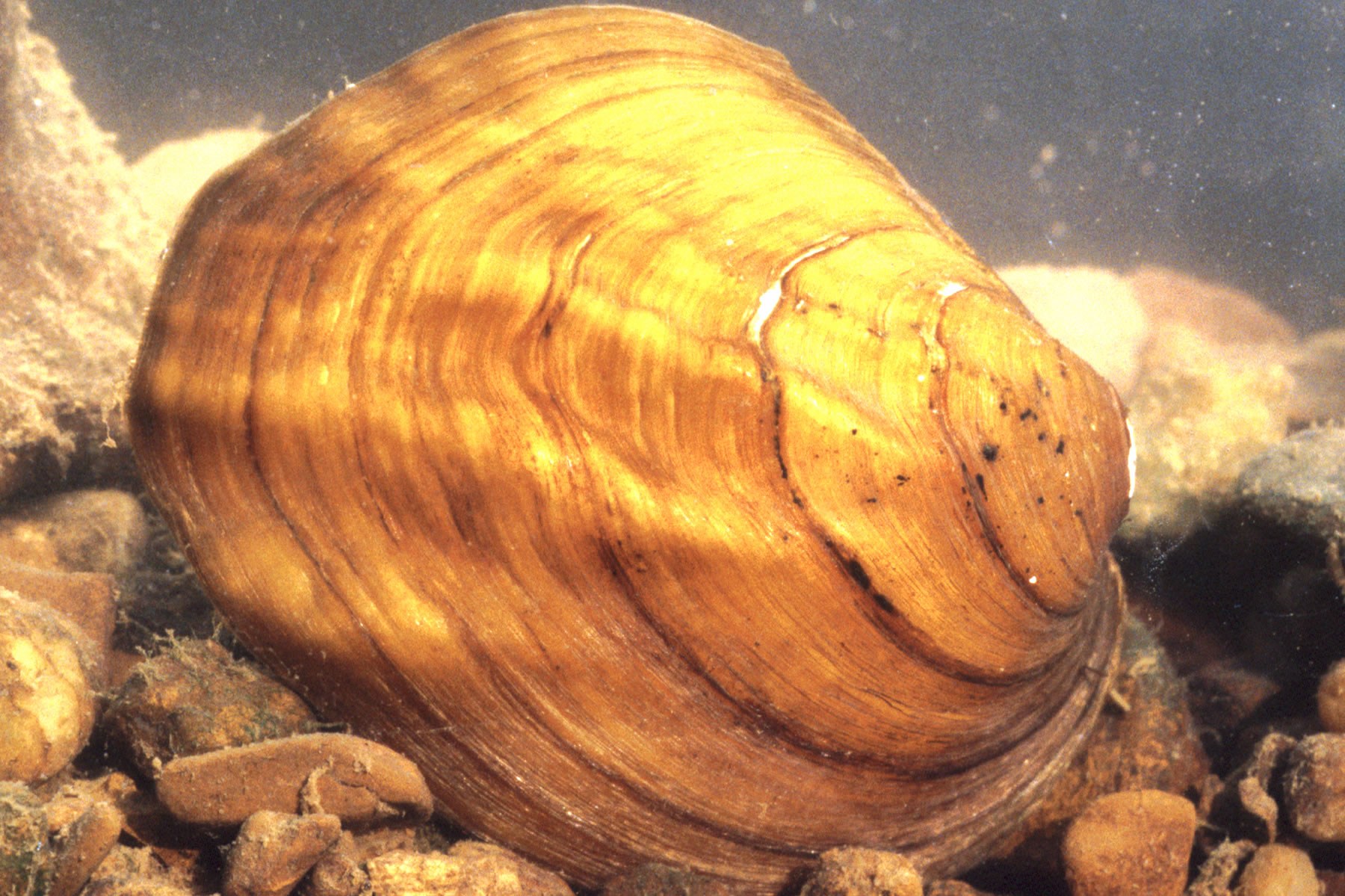
- A live individual of Amblema plicata

Conservation status
- Least Concern (IUCN 3.1)

- Secure (NatureServe)

Scientific classification
- Kingdom: Animalia
- Phylum: Mollusca
- Class: Bivalvia
- Order: Unionida
- Family: Unionidae
- Genus: Amblema
- Species: A. plicata

Binomial name
- Amblema plicata (Say, 1817)

= Amblema plicata =

Species of bivalve

Amblema plicata, common name the threeridge, is a species of freshwater mussel, an aquatic bivalve mollusk in the family Unionidae, the river mussels.
