= Apalachicola National Estuarine Research Reserve =

Protected area in Florida, US

Coordinates: 29.676°N 84.955°W

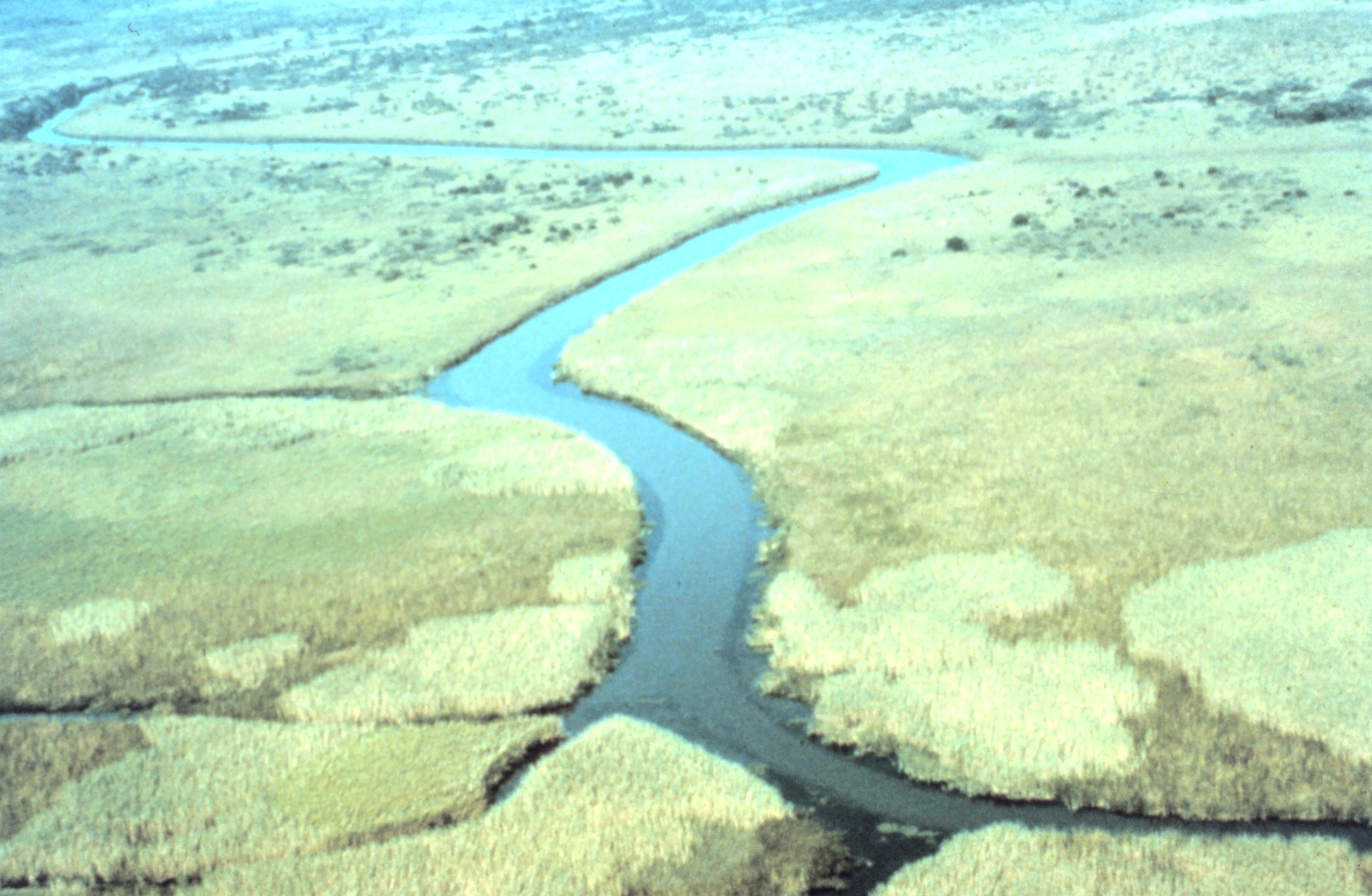

The Apalachicola National Estuarine Research Reserve, located in the U.S. state of Florida, protects the biological diversity of the Apalachicola Bay as well as the economic value of the natural resources and pristine conditions.

Between 60% and 85% of the local population make their living directly from the fishing industry, most of which is done in reserve waters. Seafood landings from the Apalachicola Reserve are worth $14–16 million dockside annually. At the consumer level, this represents a $900–$800 million industry.

Research projects that target commercial fisheries management and the food chain are a high priority in the Apalachicola Reserve. In addition to its water quality monitoring program, the reserve has engaged in extensive benthic habitat mapping in Apalachicola Bay and has a highly sophisticated geographic information systems (GIS), which is used to educate coastal managers and visiting researchers about the area and its ecology.

Other educational offerings include ongoing guest lectures for the community and coastal management workshops for environmental professionals. The reserve's K-12 educational activities are divided between classroom and on-site programs.
