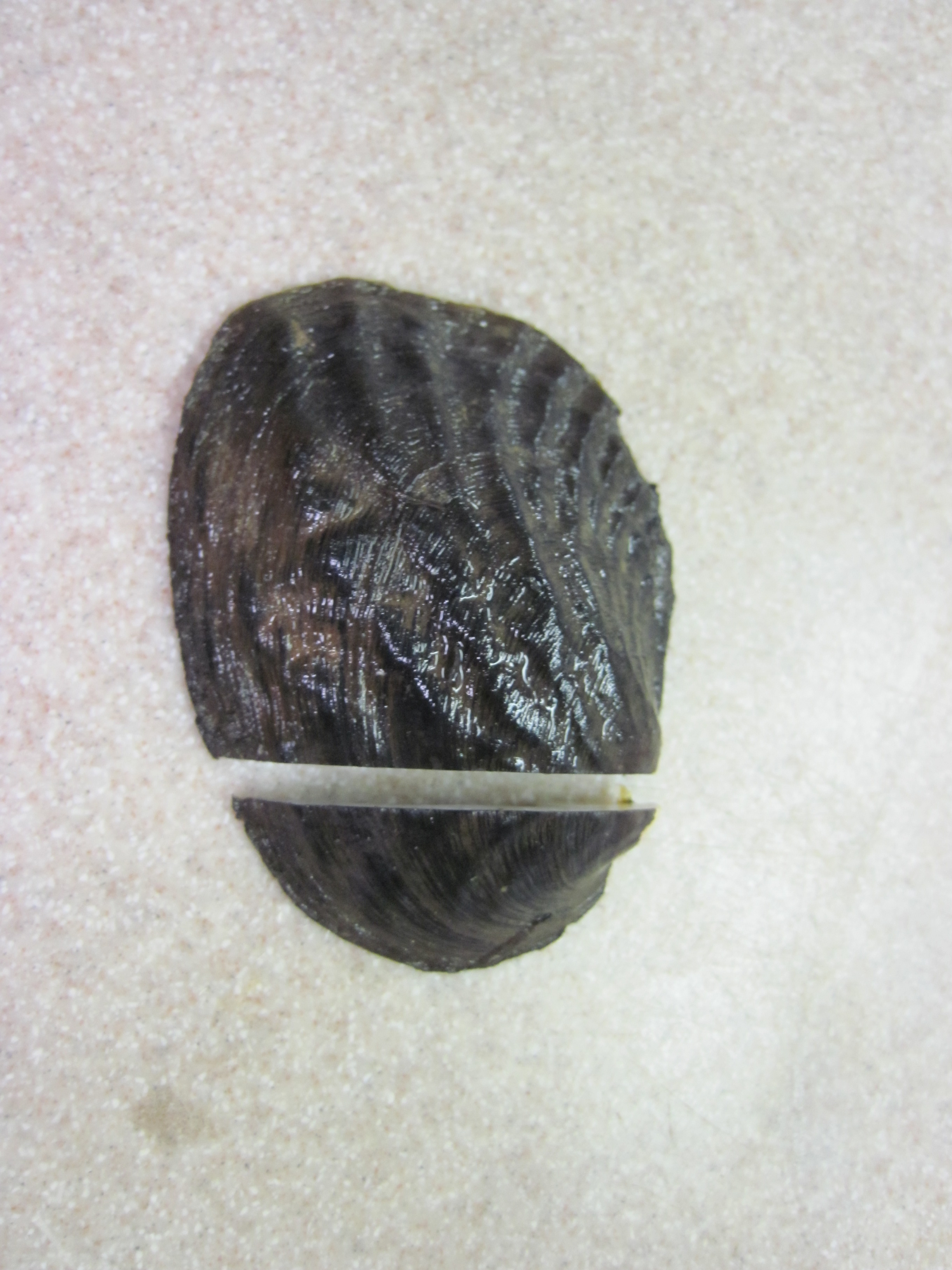

Conservation status
- Critically Endangered (IUCN 2.3)

- Critically Imperiled (NatureServe)

Scientific classification
- Kingdom: Animalia
- Phylum: Mollusca
- Class: Bivalvia
- Order: Unionida
- Family: Unionidae
- Genus: Amblema
- Species: A. neislerii

Binomial name
- Amblema neislerii I. Lea, 1858

= Amblema neislerii =

Fat threeridge

Species of bivalve

Amblema neislerii, the fat threeridge, is a freshwater mussel native to the rivers in southern Georgia and Florida. It belongs to the family Unionidae. It resides in shallow rivers in the muddy and sandy bottom of the river beds. It was named an endangered species in 1998 by state and federal agencies and it is considered critically endangered by the International Union for Conservation of Nature. The mussel is usually less than four inches in length and also in its width. It possesses a dark brown to black outer shell. Its inner shell is bluish white to purple with an iridescent appearance. The shell is unique to mussels being inflated and also possessing approximately seven to nine prominent parallel ridges.

It is a filter feeder. Food particles become trapped when filtered through and are eventually ingested.

Currently the population of these mussels is declining. This is due to critical shortages in water due to violent droughts, which are destroying their habitat, within the Apalachicola-Chattahoochee-Flint River system in Georgia and Florida. Also, pollution from people and plants along the rivers, the disappearance of host fish and the introduction of other animals such as the Asian Clam have aided in their decline in population. This specific mussel has never gotten much attention due to its physical profile that blends in with the usual muddy background and its poor motor skills. Even being listed under the Endangered Species Act did not bring much attention to this specific mussel.
