= St. Vincent Island (Florida) =

Island in Franklin County, Florida, US

- St. Vincent Island

Geography
- Coordinates: 29°39′40″N 85°08′37″W

Administration
- United States
- State: Florida
- County: Franklin

St. Vincent Island is the westernmost of four barrier islands in the northwestern Florida Gulf coast which include Cape St. George Island, St. George Island and Dog Island. The island is located just offshore in Franklin County, Florida south southeast of Cape San Blas and north of Cape St. George Island close to the mouth of the Apalachicola River and the town of Apalachicola on the Florida Panhandle.

== History ==
Archeological digs on the island resulted in the discovery of Paleo-Indian projectile points that date back to around 13,000 years ago. These materials would have been deposited by people living during the Pleistocene when, because of lower sea-levels, the area was well inland and not an island. Pottery fragments dating back 4000 years ago were also observed on the north shore of the island, but these may have been deposited there while the island was forming.

In 1633, Franciscan Friars named the island while visiting Apalachee tribes in the area.

In 1750, Creek Indians and Seminoles, offshoots of the Creek nation, entered area and inhabited the island.

During the War of 1812, the British used it to unload military supplies, preparatory to invading the United States via the Flint River (see Nicolls' Outpost).

In 1868, George Hatch bought the island.

In 1908, Dr. Ray V. Pierce imported Old World game animals to the island. In 1920 the island was used to graze beef cattle sold to Apalachicola markets.

In 1940, the first oyster lease was granted. The Pierce Estate sold first pine saw timber. St. Joe Lumber Company built a temporary bridge to the island for timber removal.

In 1948, the Loomis brothers, Alfred, Jr. and Henry, bought the island and imported zebras, elands, black buck, ring-necked pheasants, Asian jungle fowl, bobwhite quail, and semi-wild turkeys.

In 1968, St. Vincent was purchased by the Nature Conservancy for $2.2 million. U.S. Fish and Wildlife Service repaid the Conservancy with money from Duck Stamp sales and established the island as St. Vincent National Wildlife Refuge.

== Geography ==
The island is made up of ridges and swales of sand dominated by live oak and other hardwoods. The oldest sand ridge is about 3000 years old. The island also has tidal marshes and 18 sq. miles (49 km^{2}) of freshwater lakes and streams.

== Wildlife ==
St. Vincent is home to numerous shore birds, an abundance of alligators, nesting ospreys and bald eagles, peregrine falcons, wood storks, sambar deer (native to Southeast Asia) and the native white-tailed deer. The island is also a haven for endangered species such as loggerhead sea turtles, indigo snakes, gopher tortoises and the red wolf.

== Activities ==
While only accessible by boat, St. Vincent offers a wide array of activities for visitors once they arrive. The island is a popular sea kayaking and boating destination, with fishing and birding opportunities abundant along the shore. The interior of the island has over 90 miles of mapped roads open to hiking and biking. Not all roads are still in use, and only the main road (B Road) is lined with oyster shells for easier travel over the sandy soil of the island. Wildlife viewing as well as fishing from one of the four lakes stocked with largemouth bass and bluegill are also popular on the island. Annual primitive hunts help keep the population of Sambar deer, White-tailed deer, feral hogs, and raccoons in check. Licenses for hunts are awarded by lottery and are managed by the Florida Fish and Wildlife Commission.
