= Franklin County School =

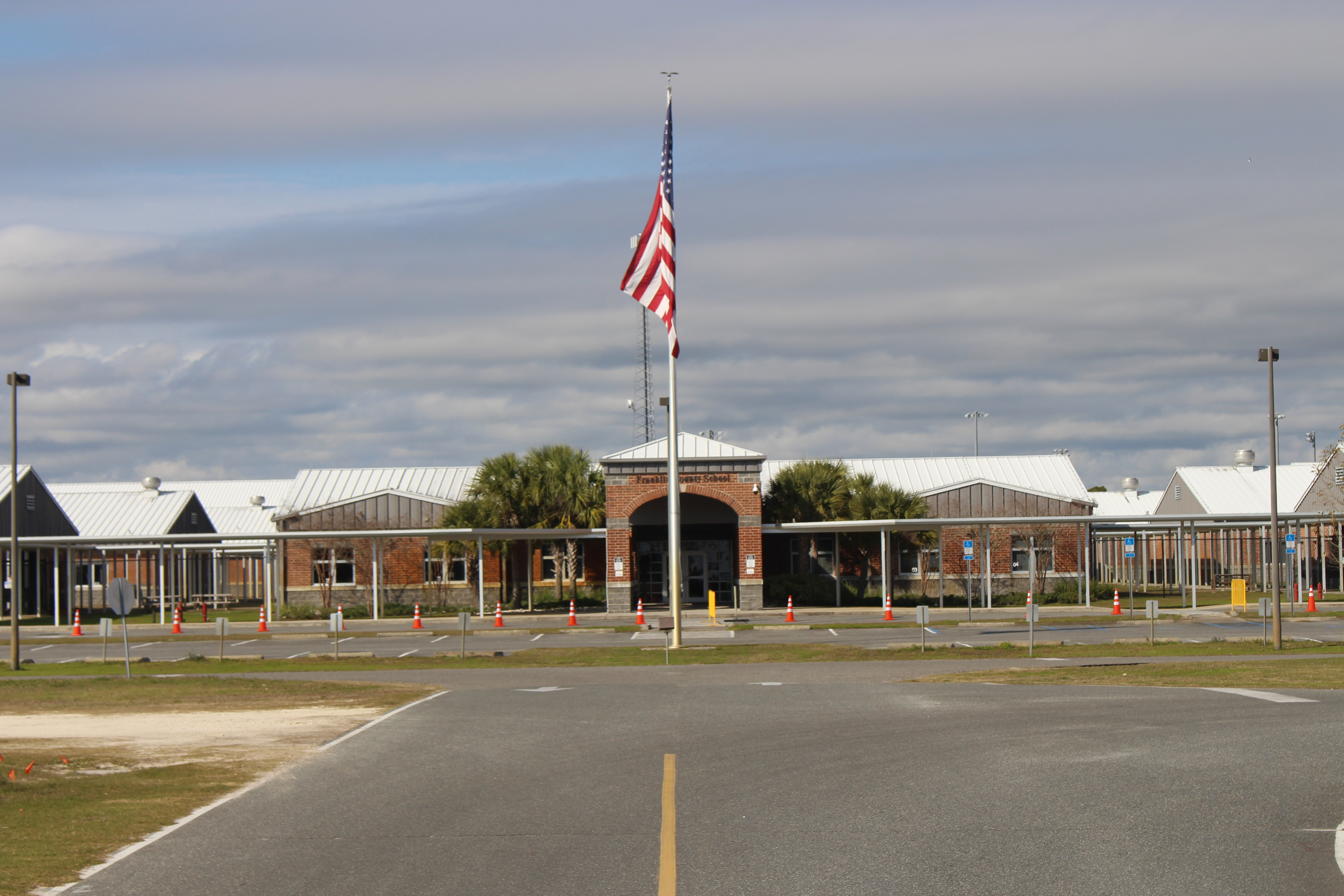

Location
- 1250 Highway 98; Eastpoint, Florida address United States
- 29°45′57″N 84°49′0″W

Information
- Type: Public
- School district: Franklin County School District (Florida)
- NCES School ID: 120057000845
- Faculty: 57.50 (on FTE basis)
- Grades: PreK to 12
- Enrollment: 832 (2020-21)
- Student to teacher ratio: 14.47
- Mascot: Seahawks
- Website: fcs.franklincountyschools.org

Franklin County School serves pre-kindergarten through 12th grade at 1250 Highway 98 in unincorporated Franklin County, Florida, United States. It is 2 miles (3.2 km) away from the center of Eastpoint. The school has an Eastpoint postal address, though it is not in the Eastpoint census-designated place.

It is a part of the Franklin County School District.

== History ==
The school was established in 2007, as a consolidation of schools in Apalachicola, Carrabelle, and Eastpoint. The Florida Legislature established a special facilities fund for school districts trying to build new schools but which do not have access to the necessary funds; this fund was used to build Franklin County School.

The school opened in 2008.

== Transportation ==
In 2007 the district leadership anticipated that most students would travel to and from the school on a school bus, a characteristic which meant students who previously traveled to the pre-consolidation schools on bicycles or other means would no longer do so.

== Athletics ==
The school's teams compete as the Seahawks.
