= Franklin County School District (Florida) =

School district in Florida, United States

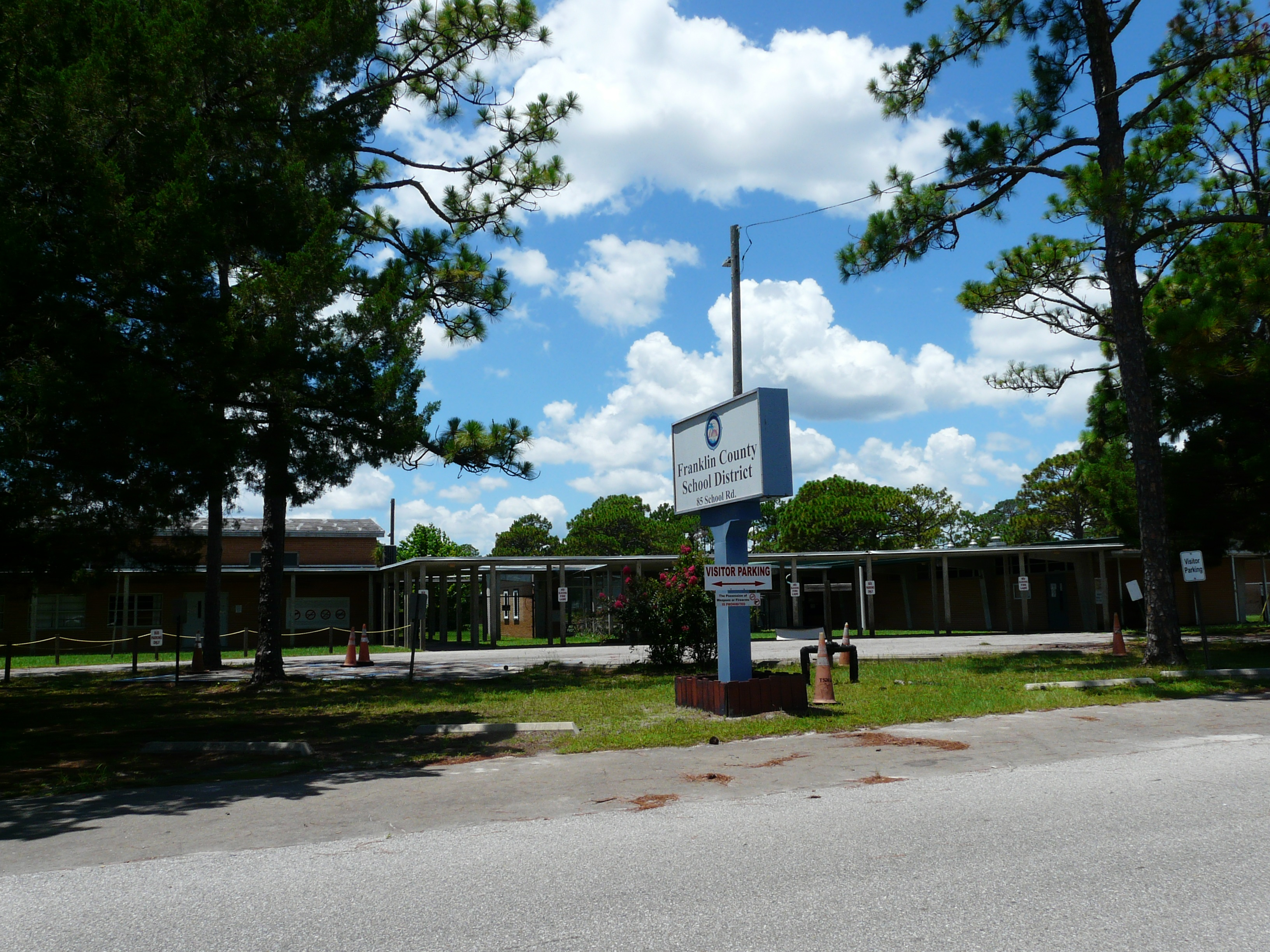
- School district headquarters (former Brown Elementary School)

Address
- 85 School Road, Suite 1 Eastpoint, Franklin County, Florida, 32328; United States

District information
- Grades: PK–12
- Schools: 7
- NCES District ID: 1200570
- District ID: FL-19

Students and staff
- Students: 1,226 (2020–21)
- Faculty: 76.50 (on an FTE basis)
- Student–teacher ratio: 16.03

Other information
- Website: www.franklincountyschools.org

Franklin County School District is a public school district in Franklin County, Florida, United States.

It is the sole school district of the county.

== History ==
Circa 1966, the racial desegregation plan for the district was having racial integration done all at once. In April 1966 the board of trustees decided that it should move to a program where

Curtis McLean became the superintendent in 1956 and resigned in 1966, with him leaving office on October 1. He cited difficulties in the federal government not accepting the school district's proposals on how to racially integrate the schools after years.

In 2025, the school district leadership held meetings regarding the possibility of having students attend classes four days per week instead of five.

== Schools ==
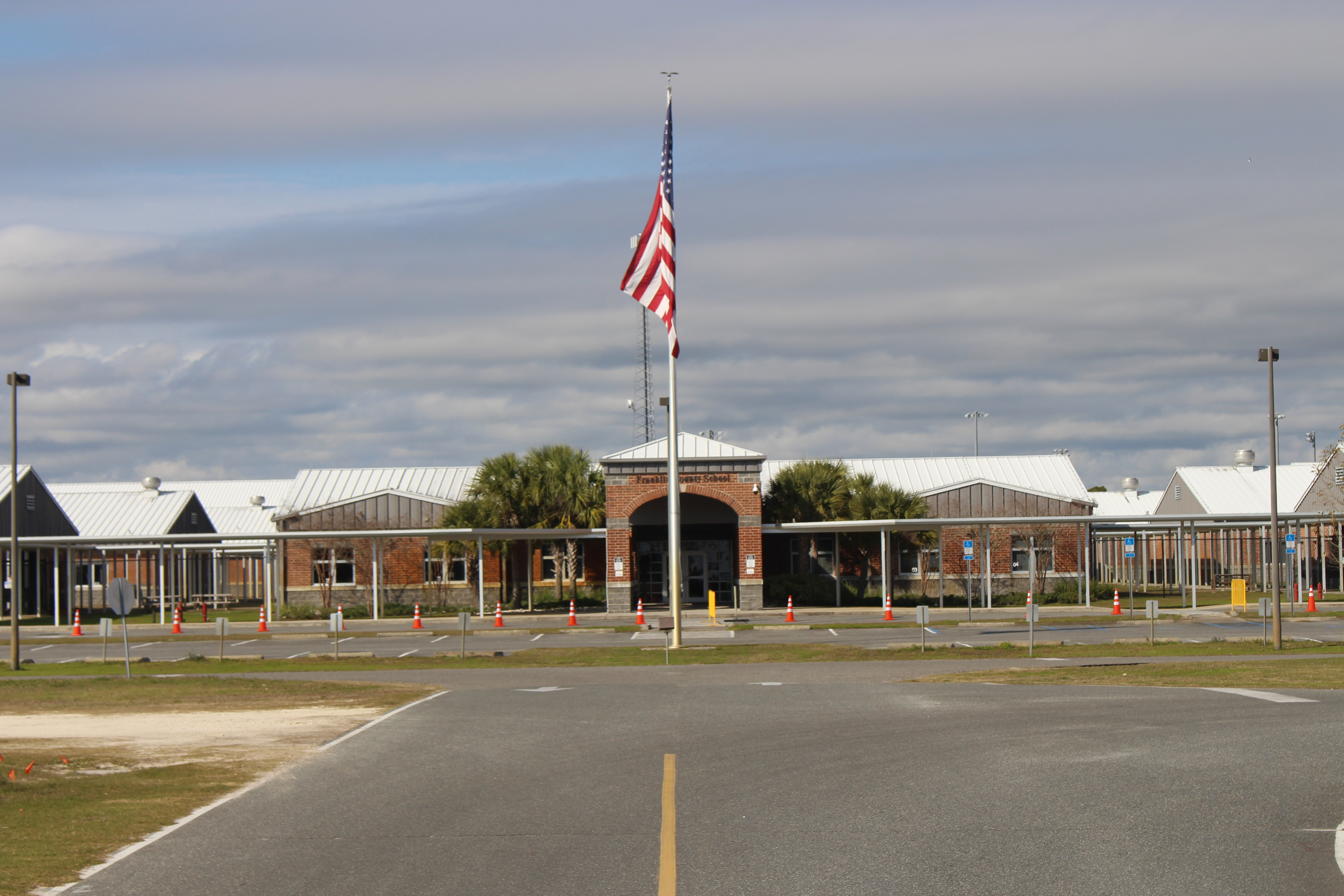
Franklin County School

- Franklin County School (K-12)
- Apalachicola Bay Charter School (K-8)
  - In 2001 the school district board of trustees approved the application to establish the school.
- Franklin County Learning Center
- Franklin District Virtual Course Program
- Franklin Virtual Franchise-Pace FLVS
- Franklin Virtual Instruction Program

Former schools

- Brown Elementary School (Eastpoint)
- Chapman Elementary School (Apalachicola)
- Apalachicola High School
- Carrabelle High School

In 2007, prior to the opening of the consolidated K-12 school near Eastpoint, high school students had been consolidated in the Carrabelle school, which had grades K-12, while the previous school in Eastpoint had grades K-5 and the Apalachicola campus had grades K-8.
