= Eastpoint, Florida =

- CDP
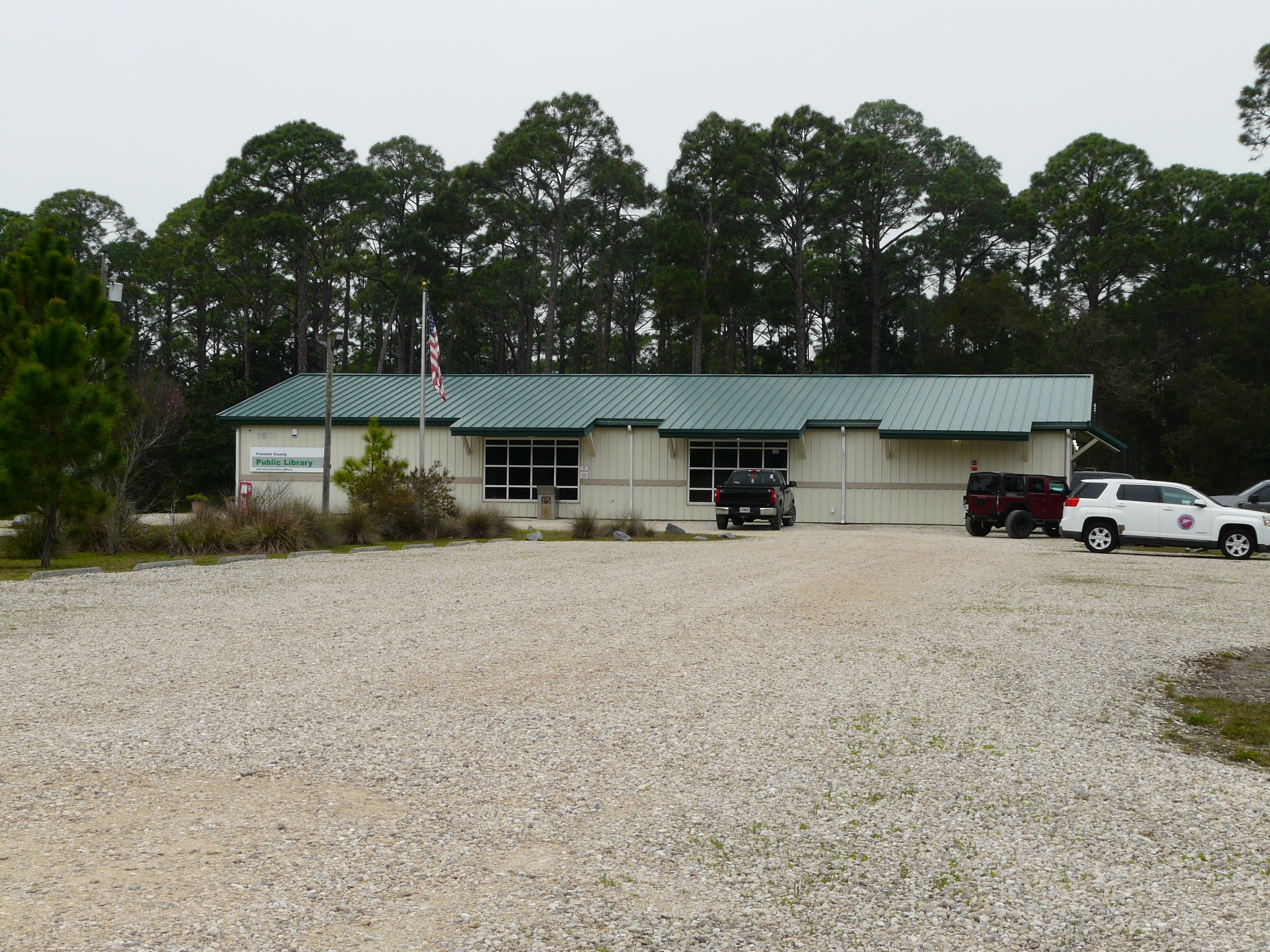
- Franklin County Public Library in Eastpoint

- Location in Franklin County and the state of Florida
- Coordinates: 29°44′42″N 84°52′37″W
- Country: United States
- State: Florida
- County: Franklin

Area
  - Total: 7.47 sq mi (19.34 km^{2})
  - Land: 7.44 sq mi (19.28 km^{2})
  - Water: 0.023 sq mi (0.06 km^{2})
- Elevation: 23 ft (7.0 m)

Population (2020)
  - Total: 2,614
  - Density: 351.2/sq mi (135.59/km^{2})
- Time zone: UTC-5 (Eastern (EST))
  - Summer (DST): UTC-4 (EDT)
- ZIP code: 32328
- Area code: 850
- FIPS code: 12-19400
- GNIS feature ID: 2402439

Eastpoint is a census-designated place (CDP) in Franklin County, Florida, United States. The population was 2,614 at the 2020 census.

== Geography ==
According to the United States Census Bureau, the CDP has a total area of 7.3 square miles (19 km^{2}), all land.

== Demographics ==
Historical population
Census	Pop.	Note	%±
2020	2,614		—
U.S. Decennial Census

=== 2020 census ===
As of the 2020 census, Eastpoint had a population of 2,614. The median age was 42.8 years. 22.7% of residents were under the age of 18 and 19.8% of residents were 65 years of age or older. For every 100 females there were 98.2 males, and for every 100 females age 18 and over there were 94.0 males age 18 and over.

0.0% of residents lived in urban areas, while 100.0% lived in rural areas.

There were 1,001 households in Eastpoint, of which 26.9% had children under the age of 18 living in them. Of all households, 52.4% were married-couple households, 15.6% were households with a male householder and no spouse or partner present, and 23.9% were households with a female householder and no spouse or partner present. About 22.5% of all households were made up of individuals and 12.4% had someone living alone who was 65 years of age or older.

There were 1,157 housing units, of which 13.5% were vacant. The homeowner vacancy rate was 2.1% and the rental vacancy rate was 6.1%.

Racial composition as of the 2020 census
Race	Number	Percent
White	2,370	90.7%
Black or African American	33	1.3%
American Indian and Alaska Native	17	0.7%
Asian	3	0.1%
Native Hawaiian and Other Pacific Islander	1	0.0%
Some other race	46	1.8%
Two or more races	144	5.5%
Hispanic or Latino (of any race)	107	4.1%

=== 2000 census ===
As of the census of 2000, there were 2,158 people, 804 households, and 612 families residing in the CDP. The population density was 294.4 inhabitants per square mile (113.7/km^{2}). There were 911 housing units at an average density of 124.3 per square mile (48.0/km^{2}). The racial makeup of the CDP was 96.57% White, 0.79% African American, 0.42% Native American, 0.09% Asian, 0.56% from other races, and 1.58% from two or more races. Hispanic or Latino of any race were 1.67% of the population.

There were 804 households, out of which 36.3% had children under the age of 18 living with them, 59.3% were married couples living together, 11.4% had a female householder with no husband present, and 23.8% were non-families. 18.7% of all households were made up of individuals, and 6.8% had someone living alone who was 65 years of age or older. The average household size was 2.61 and the average family size was 2.95.

In the CDP, the population was spread out, with 26.4% under the age of 18, 7.6% from 18 to 24, 28.0% from 25 to 44, 24.6% from 45 to 64, and 13.5% who were 65 years of age or older. The median age was 36 years. For every 100 females, there were 99.6 males. For every 100 females age 18 and over, there were 96.4 males.

The median income for a household in the CDP was $30,324, and the median income for a family was $29,940. Males had a median income of $23,750 versus $25,179 for females. The per capita income for the CDP was $13,382. About 6.3% of families and 12.1% of the population were below the poverty line, including 17.0% of those under age 18 and 6.7% of those age 65 or over.

== Education ==
Eastpoint is within the Franklin County Schools system. The Franklin County School, a K-12 school, houses the district's elementary, middle and high school programs. It is located outside of Eastpoint, just to its east.

Many students in Eastpoint attend the Apalachicola Bay Charter (ABC) School in Apalachicola, which is a pre-k through 8th grade school.

Franklin County Public Library maintains the Eastpoint Branch.

Gulf Coast State College operates the Gulf/Franklin Campus in Port St. Joe in Gulf County.

== 2018 fire ==
On June 24, 2018, a controlled fire struck the town of Eastpoint and burned about 1,000 acres in 24 hours. 36 families lost their homes; families were displaced to the Eastpoint Church of God where the Red Cross took in more than 175 people.

== Gallery ==
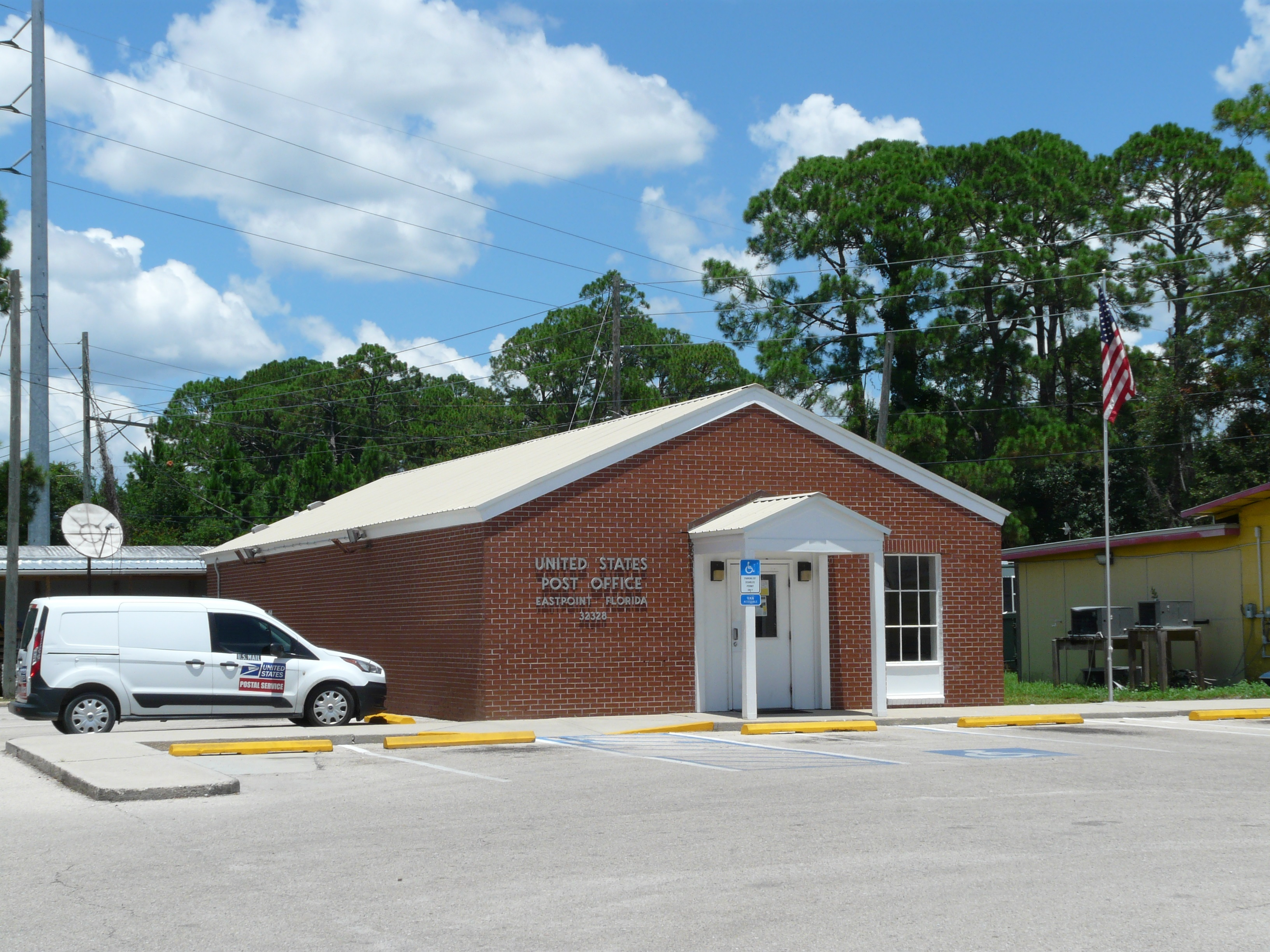
Post office

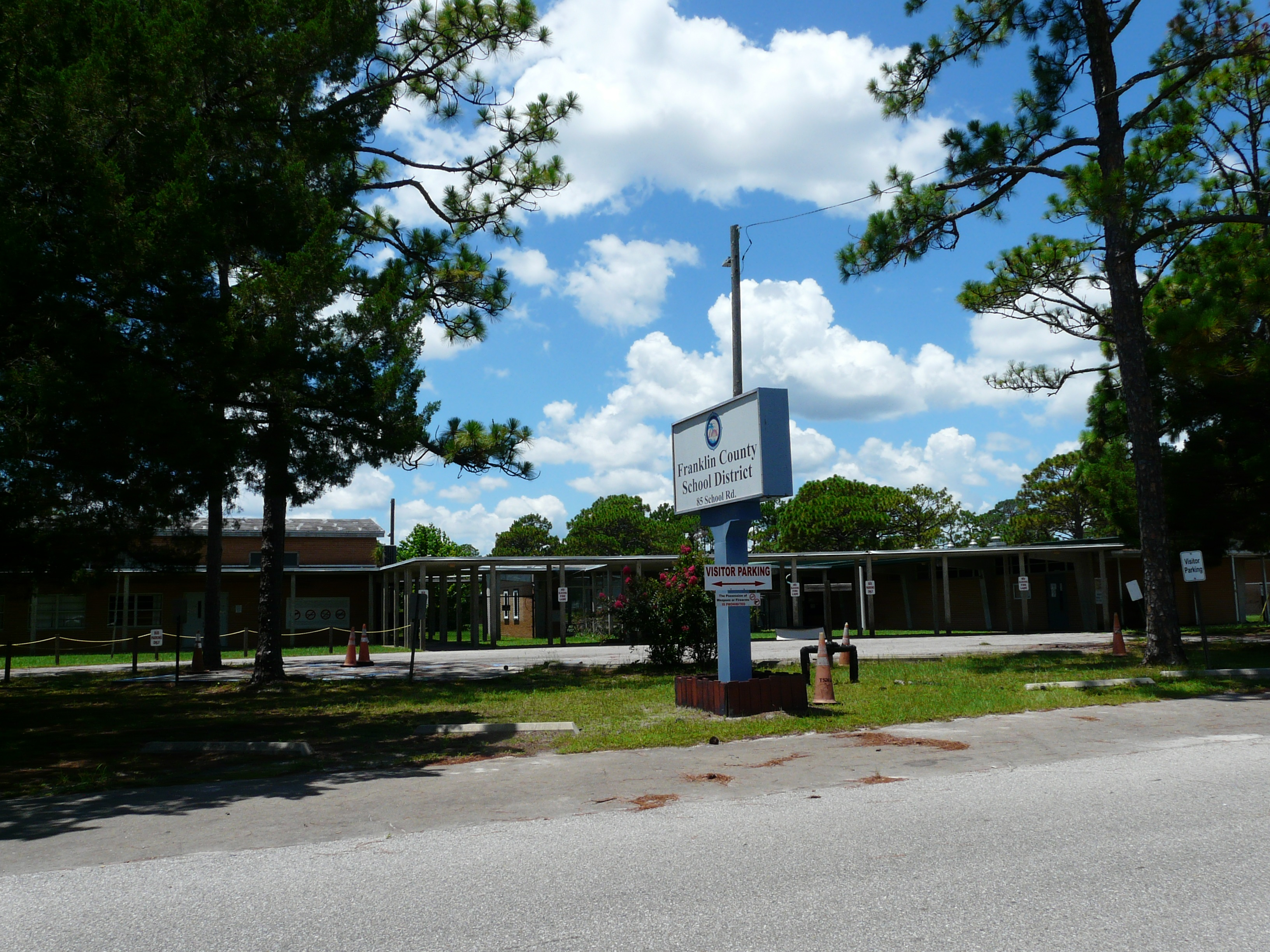
Franklin County Schools headquarters (former Brown Elementary School)
