= Franklin County, Florida =

County in Florida, United States

- County
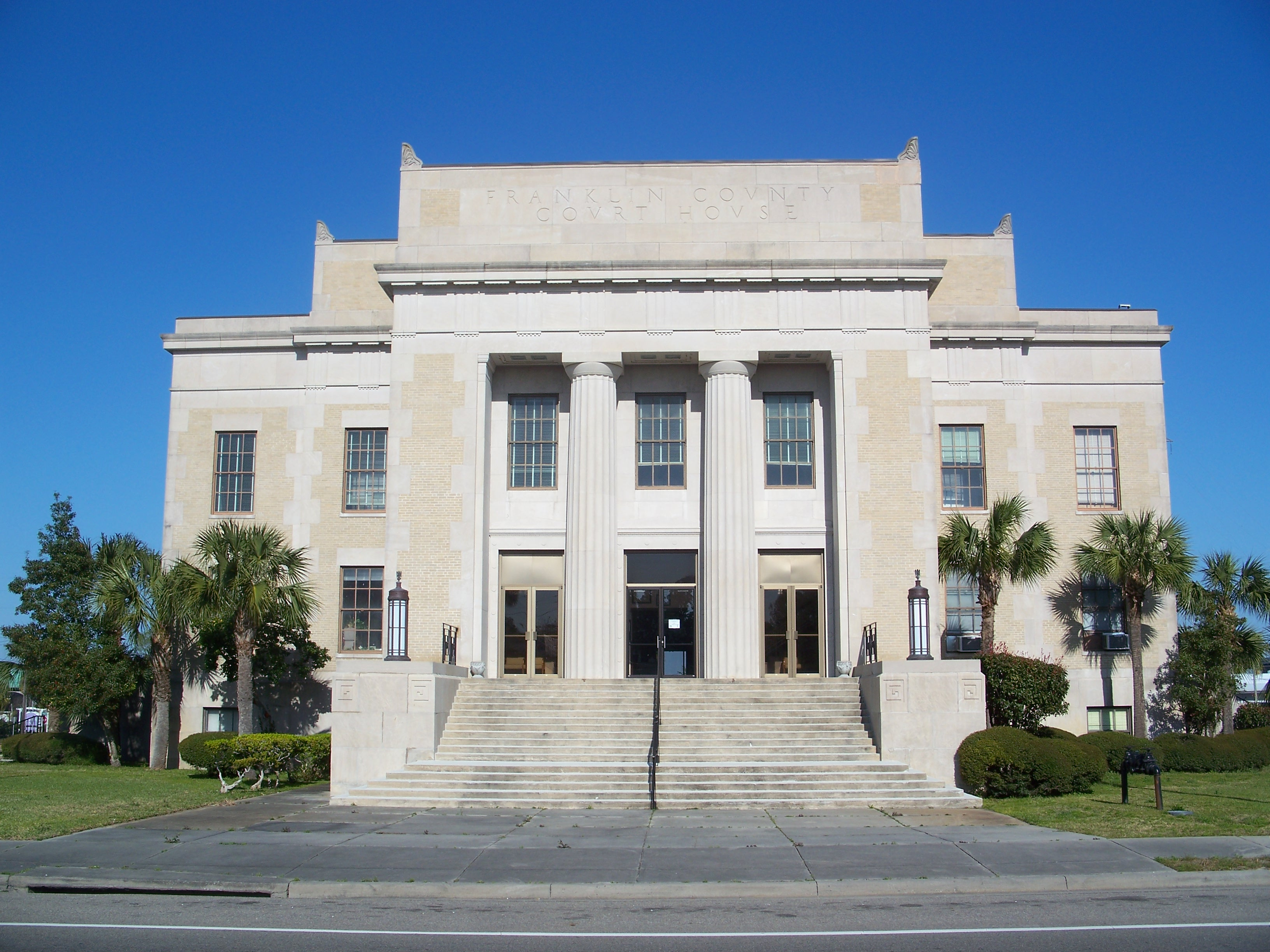
- Franklin County Courthouse

- Seal

- Location within the U.S. state of Florida
- Coordinates: 29°48′N 84°49′W
- Country: United States
- State: Florida
- Founded: February 8, 1832
- Named for: Benjamin Franklin
- Seat: Apalachicola
- Largest city: Carrabelle

Area
  - Total: 1,026 sq mi (2,660 km^{2})
  - Land: 535 sq mi (1,390 km^{2})
  - Water: 492 sq mi (1,270 km^{2}) 47.9%

Population (2020)
  - Total: 12,451
  - Estimate (2025): 13,029 ▲
  - Density: 23.3/sq mi (8.99/km^{2})
- Time zone: UTC−5 (Eastern)
  - Summer (DST): UTC−4 (EDT)
- Congressional district: 2nd
- Website: www.franklincountyflorida.com

Franklin County is a county along the Gulf of Mexico in the panhandle of the U.S. state of Florida. As of the 2020 census, the population was 12,451, making it the third-least populous county in Florida. The county seat is Apalachicola. The county includes several large preserved areas and rivers and has been home to commercial timber and fishing industry. More recently it has become popular for tourism and retirement. It includes several rivers, state parks, and islands.

== History ==
Franklin County was founded in 1832. It was named for Benjamin Franklin.

The second largest town in Franklin County is Carrabelle, 25 miles east of Apalachicola on the Carrabelle River.

=== Camp Gordon Johnston ===
During World War II most of Franklin County was used by the U.S. Army for amphibious and jungle training, for which the beaches and islands were ideal. When the war ended and the military left, Lanark Village was established from the remaining officer's quarters.

== Geography ==
According to the U.S. Census Bureau, the county has a total area of 1,026 square miles (2,660 km^{2}), of which 535 square miles (1,390 km^{2}) is land and 492 square miles (1,270 km^{2}) (47.9%) is water.

Franklin County includes part of Tate's Hell State Forest. Bald Point State Park is nearby. The county's river's include the Carrabelle River and its tributaries the New River (Florida Panhandle) and Crooked River (Florida), visited by paddlers. The extreme eastern tip of the county is bordered by the Ochlockonee River.

=== Adjacent counties ===
- Liberty County, Florida – north
- Wakulla County, Florida – northeast
- Gulf County, Florida – west (northern part of the county observes CDT/CST time)

=== National protected areas ===
- Apalachicola National Forest (part)
- St. Vincent National Wildlife Refuge (part)

=== Barrier islands ===
- Cape St. George Island
- Dog Island
- St. George Island
- St. Vincent Island

Also, St. James Island, while part of the mainland, is technically an island, being separated from the rest of Franklin County by rivers and an estuary.

=== Historic sites ===
- Crooked River Light
- Prospect Bluff Historic Sites

== Demographics ==
Historical population
Census	Pop.	Note	%±
1840	1,030		—
1850	1,561		51.6%
1860	1,904		22.0%
1870	1,256		−34.0%
1880	1,791		42.6%
1890	3,308		84.7%
1900	4,890		47.8%
1910	5,201		6.4%
1920	5,318		2.2%
1930	6,283		18.1%
1940	5,991		−4.6%
1950	5,814		−3.0%
1960	6,576		13.1%
1970	7,065		7.4%
1980	7,661		8.4%
1990	8,967		17.0%
2000	11,057		23.3%
2010	11,549		4.4%
2020	12,451		7.8%
2025 (est.)	13,029	▲	4.6%
U.S. Decennial Census; 1790-1960 1900-1990; 1990-2000 2010-2015 2019

=== Racial and ethnic composition ===
A map of racial demographics in Franklin County, Florida by Census tract (2023) Legend: Non-Hispanic White 40–50% 70–80% 80–90% >90%

Franklin County, Florida – Racial and ethnic composition Note: the US Census treats Hispanic/Latino as an ethnic category. This table excludes Latinos from the racial categories and assigns them to a separate category. Hispanics/Latinos may be of any race.
Race / Ethnicity (NH = Non-Hispanic)	Pop 1980	Pop 1990	Pop 2000	Pop 2010	Pop 2020	% 1980	% 1990	% 2000	% 2010	% 2020
White alone (NH)	6,474	7,727	8,822	9,188	9,798	84.51%	86.17%	79.79%	79.56%	78.69%
Black or African American alone (NH)	1,086	1,107	1,762	1,574	1,403	14.18%	12.35%	15.94%	13.63%	11.27%
Native American or Alaska Native alone (NH)	17	49	47	52	41	0.22%	0.55%	0.43%	0.45%	0.33%
Asian alone (NH)	8	17	19	26	30	0.10%	0.19%	0.17%	0.23%	0.24%
Native Hawaiian or Pacific Islander alone (NH)	x	x	2	2	2	x	x	0.02%	0.02%	0.02%
Other race alone (NH)	6	2	10	3	41	0.08%	0.02%	0.09%	0.03%	0.33%
Mixed race or Multiracial (NH)	x	x	127	175	461	x	x	1.15%	1.52%	3.70%
Hispanic or Latino (any race)	70	65	268	529	675	0.91%	0.72%	2.42%	4.58%	5.42%
Total	7,661	8,967	11,057	11,549	12,451	100.00%	100.00%	100.00%	100.00%	100.00%

=== 2020 census ===
As of the 2020 census, there were 12,451 people, 4,947 households, and 2,926 families residing in the county, and the median age was 50.7 years.

Children under the age of 18 comprised 15.2% of residents and 27.2% were 65 years of age or older; for every 100 females there were 120.1 males and for every 100 females age 18 and over there were 121.4 males age 18 and over.

The racial makeup of the county was 80.3% White, 11.4% Black or African American, 0.4% American Indian and Alaska Native, 0.2% Asian, <0.1% Native Hawaiian and Pacific Islander, 2.5% from some other race, and 5.1% from two or more races. Hispanic or Latino residents of any race comprised 5.4% of the population.

Less than 0.1% of residents lived in urban areas, while 100.0% lived in rural areas.

There were 4,947 households in the county, of which 20.7% had children under the age of 18 living in them. Of all households, 47.6% were married-couple households, 19.7% were households with a male householder and no spouse or partner present, and 26.6% were households with a female householder and no spouse or partner present. About 30.1% of all households were made up of individuals and 16.0% had someone living alone who was 65 years of age or older.

There were 8,347 housing units, of which 40.7% were vacant. Among occupied housing units, 76.8% were owner-occupied and 23.2% were renter-occupied. The homeowner vacancy rate was 3.5% and the rental vacancy rate was 20.9%.

=== 2000 census ===
As of the census of 2000, there were 11,057 people, 4,096 households, and 2,727 families residing in the county. The population density was 20 people per square mile (7.7 people/km^{2}). There were 7,180 housing units at an average density of 13 per square mile (5.0/km^{2}). The racial makeup of the county was 81.24% White, 16.32% Black or African American, 0.45% Native American, 0.20% Asian, 0.02% Pacific Islander, 0.43% from other races, and 1.34% from two or more races. 2.42% of the population were Hispanic or Latino of any race.

There were 4,096 households, out of which 24.80% had children under the age of 18 living with them, 52.50% were married couples living together, 9.80% had a female householder with no husband present, and 33.40% were non-families. 28.70% of all households were made up of individuals, and 11.80% had someone living alone who was 65 years of age or older. The average household size was 2.28 and the average family size was 2.77.

In the county, the population was spread out, with 18.00% under the age of 18, 7.60% from 18 to 24, 30.80% from 25 to 44, 27.80% from 45 to 64, and 15.70% who were 65 years of age or older. The median age was 41 years. For every 100 females there were 129.60 males. For every 100 females age 18 and over, there were 135.70 males.

The median income for a household in the county was $26,756, and the median income for a family was $31,157. Males had a median income of $25,101 versus $20,494 for females. The per capita income for the county was $16,140. About 11.80% of families and 17.70% of the population were below the poverty line, including 23.20% of those under age 18 and 13.90% of those age 65 or over.

== Education ==
Franklin County residents are within the Franklin County School District. All Students K-12 attend the Franklin County School at Eastpoint, except those attending the Apalachicola Bay Charter School or other private schools.

Gulf Coast State College operates the Gulf/Franklin Campus in Port St. Joe in Gulf County.

The Franklin County Public Library works with the Wilderness Coast Public Libraries. The FCPL has two library branches.

- Carrabelle
- Eastpoint

In addition, Franklin County has the Apalachicola Margaret Key Library, an independent library with a history of providing services for over 100 years. It is not a member of Wilderness Coast, but is recognized by the state.

== Politics ==
=== Voter registration ===
Franklin County Voter Registration & Party Enrollment as of April 30, 2022
Political Party	Total Voters	Percentage
Democratic	3,115	42.00%
Republican	3,408	45.95%
Independent	755	10.47%
Third Parties	138	1.91%
Total	7,416	100.00%

=== Statewide elections ===
United States presidential election results for Franklin County, Florida
Year	Republican		Democratic		Third party(ies)	
Year	No.	%	No.	%	No.	%
1904	144	29.69%	336	69.28%	5	1.03%
1908	112	22.54%	283	56.94%	102	20.52%
1912	58	14.87%	266	68.21%	66	16.92%
1916	81	16.80%	312	64.73%	89	18.46%
1920	276	29.18%	587	62.05%	83	8.77%
1924	109	20.00%	417	76.51%	19	3.49%
1928	334	44.30%	417	55.31%	3	0.40%
1932	99	9.37%	958	90.63%	0	0.00%
1936	125	8.13%	1,413	91.87%	0	0.00%
1940	102	6.79%	1,400	93.21%	0	0.00%
1944	102	7.98%	1,176	92.02%	0	0.00%
1948	130	12.24%	635	59.79%	297	27.97%
1952	611	33.04%	1,238	66.96%	0	0.00%
1956	571	37.34%	958	62.66%	0	0.00%
1960	764	33.84%	1,494	66.16%	0	0.00%
1964	1,419	50.95%	1,366	49.05%	0	0.00%
1968	529	16.86%	699	22.28%	1,909	60.85%
1972	2,277	82.14%	490	17.68%	5	0.18%
1976	1,054	35.45%	1,859	62.53%	60	2.02%
1980	1,508	44.59%	1,775	52.48%	99	2.93%
1984	2,218	67.05%	1,090	32.95%	0	0.00%
1988	1,913	58.52%	1,283	39.25%	73	2.23%
1992	1,664	37.99%	1,535	35.05%	1,181	26.96%
1996	1,563	34.20%	2,096	45.86%	911	19.93%
2000	2,454	52.83%	2,047	44.07%	144	3.10%
2004	3,472	58.54%	2,401	40.48%	58	0.98%
2008	3,818	63.12%	2,134	35.28%	97	1.60%
2012	3,570	64.98%	1,845	33.58%	79	1.44%
2016	4,125	68.08%	1,744	28.78%	190	3.14%
2020	4,675	68.16%	2,120	30.91%	64	0.93%
2024	4,831	71.20%	1,870	27.56%	84	1.24%

Previous gubernatorial elections results
Year	Republican	Democratic	Third parties
2022	73.56% 4,003	25.84% 1,406	0.61% 33
2018	64.72% 3,508	33.03% 1,790	2.25% 122
2014	58.17% 2,505	37.92% 1,633	3.91% 168
2010	47.72% 1,938	47.89% 1,945	4.39% 178
2006	49.89% 1,981	46.69% 1,854	3.42% 136
2002	47.81% 1,819	50.75% 1,931	1.45% 55
1998	56.08% 1,536	43.92% 1,203	
1994	33.43% 1,324	66.57% 2,636	

== Communities ==
=== Towns ===
- Apalachicola
- Carrabelle

=== Census-designated places ===
- Eastpoint
- St. George Island

=== Unincorporated communities ===
- Alligator Point
- Bald Point
- Lanark Village
- St. Teresa

== Transportation ==
=== Airports ===
- Apalachicola Regional Airport
- Carrabelle-Thompson Airport
- St. George Island Airport

=== Roads ===
- US 98
- US 319
- SR 65
- SR 300

== See also ==
- National Register of Historic Places listings in Franklin County, Florida
