= National Register of Historic Places listings in Walton County, Florida =

Location of Walton County in Florida

This is a list of the National Register of Historic Places listings in Walton County, Florida.

This is intended to be a complete list of the properties and districts on the National Register of Historic Places in Walton County, Florida, United States. The locations of National Register properties and districts for which the latitude and longitude coordinates are included below, may be seen in a map.

There are 7 properties and districts listed on the National Register in the county.

This National Park Service list is complete through NPS recent listings posted March 21, 2025.

Contents: Counties in Florida (non-linked contain no National Register listings)
Alachua - Baker - Bay - Bradford - Brevard - Broward - Calhoun - Charlotte - Citrus - Clay - Collier - Columbia - DeSoto - Dixie - Duval - Escambia - Flagler - Franklin - Gadsden - Gilchrist - Glades - Gulf - Hamilton - Hardee - Hendry - Hernando - Highlands - Hillsborough (Tampa) - Holmes - Indian River - Jackson - Jefferson - Lafayette - Lake - Lee - Leon - Levy - Liberty - Madison - Manatee - Marion - Martin - Miami-Dade (Miami) - Monroe - Nassau - Okaloosa - Okeechobee - Orange - Osceola - Palm Beach - Pasco - Pinellas - Polk - Putnam - St. Johns - St. Lucie - Santa Rosa - Sarasota - Seminole - Sumter - Suwannee - Taylor - Union - Volusia - Wakulla - Walton - Washington

== Current listings ==
	Name on the Register	Image	Date listed	Location	City or town	Description
1	Perry L. Biddle House	Perry L. Biddle House	August 28, 1992 (#92001049)	203 Scribner Avenue; 30°43′13″N 86°07′12″W	DeFuniak Springs	
2	Chautauqua Hall of Brotherhood	Chautauqua Hall of Brotherhood	August 7, 1972 (#72000358)	95 Circle Drive; 30°43′00″N 86°06′57″W	DeFuniak Springs	
3	DeFuniak Springs Historic District	DeFuniak Springs Historic District	August 28, 1992 (#92001048)	Roughly bounded by Nelson and Park Avenues and 2nd and 12th Streets; 30°43′00″N 86°06′53″W	DeFuniak Springs	
4	Eden Mansion	Eden Mansion	July 20, 2021 (#100006749)	181 Eden Gardens Rd. (Eden Gardens State Park); 30°22′17″N 86°07′05″W	Santa Rosa Beach vicinity	
5	Herman Lodge No. 108 Free & Accepted Masons of Florida		January 27, 2021 (#100006121)	314 Madison St. 30°29′37″N 86°08′12″W	Freeport	
6	Lakeside Hospital	Lakeside Hospital	July 20, 2021 (#100006750)	1290 Circle Dr. 30°43′07″N 86°06′58″W	DeFuniak Springs	
7	Sun Bright	Sun Bright	May 7, 1979 (#79000693)	606 Live Oak Avenue; 30°43′11″N 86°07′18″W	DeFuniak Springs	

== See also ==
- List of National Historic Landmarks in Florida
- National Register of Historic Places listings in Florida
