= Pensacola and Atlantic Railroad =

Former railway company in Florida

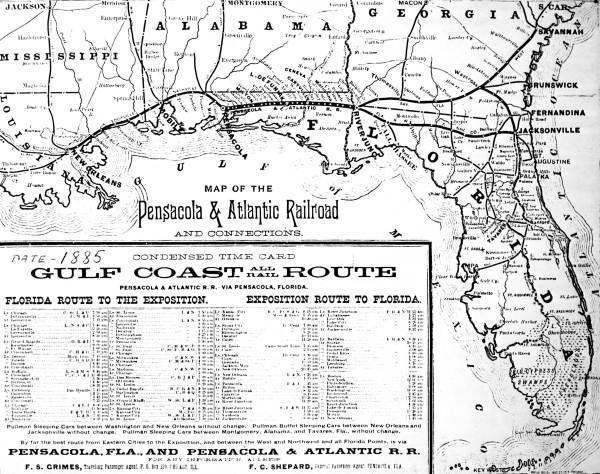
- 1885 map of the P&A route and connections

Overview
- Headquarters: Pensacola, Florida
- Locale: Florida
- Dates of operation: 1881–1891
- Successor: Louisville and Nashville Railroad

Technical
- Track gauge: 4 ft 8 1/2 in (1,435 mm) standard gauge
- Previous gauge: 5 ft (1,524 mm) and converted to 4 ft 9 in (1,448 mm) in 1886
- Length: 161 miles (259 km)

The Pensacola and Atlantic Railroad (P&A) was a company incorporated by an act of the Florida Legislature on March 4, 1881, to run from Pensacola to the Apalachicola River near Chattahoochee, a distance of about 160 miles (260 km). No railroad had ever been built across the sparsely populated panhandle of Florida, which left Pensacola isolated from the rest of the state. William D. Chipley and Frederick R. De Funiak, both of whom are commemorated in the names of towns later built along the P&A line (Chipley and DeFuniak Springs), were among the founding officers of the railroad company.

Chipley was general manager of the Pensacola Railroad, (formerly the Pensacola and Louisville Railroad, originally the Alabama and Florida Railroad, completed in 1860). The Pensacola Railroad connected Pensacola with the large, prosperous Louisville and Nashville Railroad (L&N) at Pollard, Alabama, about 44 miles (71 km) northward. The Pensacola Railroad had become a subsidiary of the L&N on October 20, 1880. It was Chipley, a tireless promoter of his adopted city, who was responsible for initiating discussions with the L&N concerning its extension into the Florida Panhandle. De Funiak was general manager of the L&N.

Once the P&A was created, De Funiak was named president of the new road, and Chipley became its vice president and general superintendent. On May 9, 1881, the L&N obtained control of the P&A by purchasing the majority of its $3 million worth of capital stock and all of its bonds, also valued at $3 million. Construction was completed in 1883, and in 1891 the P&A was absorbed into the L&N, operating thereafter as the P&A Division of the latter. After various mergers, CSX Railroad operated the line from 1986 to 2019 as its P&A Subdivision (a reference to the Pensacola and Atlantic).

The line remains in service today as part of the Florida Gulf & Atlantic Railroad, which bought the line and took over operations on June 1, 2019. CSX retained ownership of the line from milepost 651.0 to milepost 645.0 (Goulding Yard in Pensacola), and has trackage rights over the FG&A.

== History ==
=== Construction ===
After the L&N took control, construction proceeded rapidly, beginning on June 1, 1881, and was completed in 22 months. By April 1882, "2,278 men were engaged in grading, cutting cross-ties, piling and bridging, and laying track."

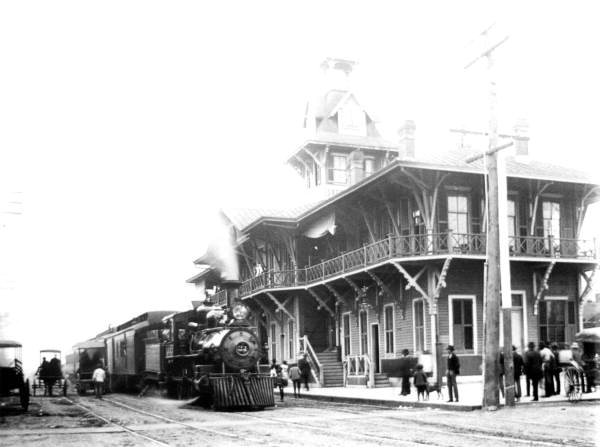
The P&A passenger station in Pensacola, located at Wright and Tarragona, opened in August 1882. A freight depot was built a few blocks away.

In May a locomotive, rolling stock, and rails were shipped by barge across the Pensacola Bay and up the Blackwater River to Milton, about 20 miles (32 km) east of Pensacola, to enable construction to proceed eastward from there. Similar supplies and equipment were also landed by barge on the east bank of the Choctawhatchee River near present-day Caryville, and at Sampson's Landing on the west bank of the Apalachicola just below Chattahoochee.

Bids were submitted by local and out-of-state contractors who undertook the construction work in sections along the line, including H. S. Harris for the section from Milton to the Shoal River, near present-day Crestview; Sam Baker of Thomasville, Georgia for a section west of the Choctawhatchee; the McClendon Construction Company, also of Thomasville, for the 35 miles (56 km) from the Choctawhatchee to Marianna; and John T. Howard of Quincy, Florida for the 25 miles (40 km) from Marianna to the Apalachicola.

Both white and black laborers from the Panhandle as well as adjoining parts of Alabama and Georgia were recruited to build the track and bridges. After some disputes among competing groups of laborers, wages were set at $1.50 a day for all workers.

Delays were caused by outbreaks of swamp fever all along the line, causing many men to fall ill; no medical help was available in the very thinly settled section between Milton and Marianna. When a bridge contractor from Macon, Georgia, died from the fever, his body had to be carried by wagon on a journey of several days from the work camp at the Choctawhatchee River to Troy, Alabama, the nearest point served by a railroad connection to Macon, for shipment to his hometown for burial. Nevertheless, despite all the difficulties of working in such an isolated region, with no repair shops and a largely inexperienced work crew, construction proceeded at a rapid pace.

Wooden depots were built by the P&A at Milton and Marianna, the only towns of any size in the Panhandle at that time; in other localities along the route, boxcars parked on sidings served as temporary depots. After a 2 1/2-mile (4 km) trestle across Escambia Bay from Pensacola was completed, official groundbreaking ceremonies were held in Pensacola on August 22, 1882, at the new Pensacola and Atlantic depot at the corner of Tarragona and Wright streets. This two-story wooden structure was replaced in 1912 by a larger L&N passenger station of brick and stucco, at the corner of Wright and Alcaniz.

By February 1883, the line was completed to the Apalachicola River and a bridge was completed over the river in April. Until the bridge was completed, for several weeks passengers were ferried across the Apalachicola by boat.

=== Local reaction ===
The recollections of J. D. Smith of Thomasville, Georgia, who at age 19 hired out as a foreman on the crew building westward from Marianna, were published in a 1926 issue of the L&N Employees' Magazine:

I was surprised to find in Jackson County, fertile lands, and the country around Marianna inhabited with old-line Southern farmers, a people of the highest type of civilization, operating many large plantations, at that time snow-white for miles and miles along the public roads, with hundreds of negroes picking and ginning it for market. The banks of the Chattahoochee River were covered with hundreds of bales of cotton that could not be moved by the steamboats as the water was very low. . . . Much money was lost by the planters on account of long delays in shipping their cotton up the Chattahoochee River to Columbus, Ga., waiting on rains to raise the river.

The people [at Greenwood] and at Marianna came out to question us about the railroad. They had been fooled for so many years by promises made to give them a railroad that they seemed to have no confidence in the project being carried out. I assured them they would now have a railroad, that the Old Reliable L&N was behind the move and we would build the railroad very quickly. People were rejoicing everywhere at the thought of this wonderful improvement. . . .

After reaching a point where Cottondale is now situated, we passed the place where civilization existed. . . . From that point on westward the railroad did not go near a single house until it reached Milton. . . . It was amusing to see the people coming from distant shacks to see the construction going on. The majority of these people had no conception of what a train looked like. Some thought it had life. They even asked me if a train could get in the door of a man's house. However, these were settlements of uninformed people living away from the railroad. . . .

=== Track gauge ===
The line was built to 5 ft (1,524 mm) gauge, as was common for Southern railroads of the time, including the L&N, and used 50-pound steel rail. Completed main-line trackage was 161.74 miles (260.3 km), with sidings totaling 9.1 miles (15 km). On May 30, 1886, the Louisville and Nashville changed the gauge of all its lines (over 2,000 miles (3,200 km) of track) to 4 ft 9 in (1,448 mm) in a one-day system-wide effort requiring the labor of about 8,000 men from dawn to dusk. Ten years later, in a more gradual effort, the system changed to the 4 ft 8 1/2 in (1,435 mm) standard gauge.

=== Locomotives ===
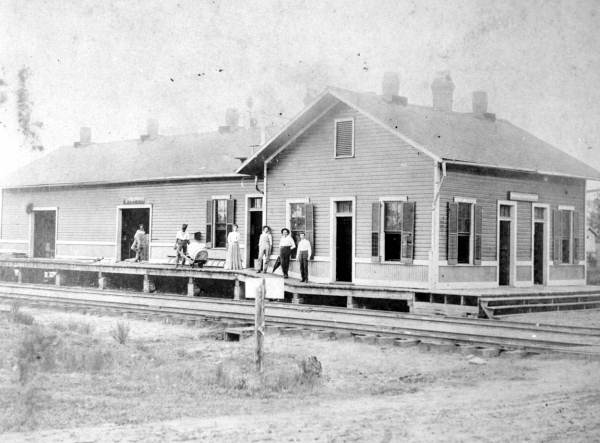
The original depot built by the P&A at Milton; the ticket office and waiting room is to the right, while the elevated freight section is to the left. Notice the water barrels attached to the roofline, an early fire-control measure.

The Pensacola and Atlantic owned at least 13 locomotives, numbered 1–13, which it bought from the L&N. Ten of these, which were returned to the L&N in 1891, were the 4-4-0 American or eight-wheeler type, including four built by Rogers in 1882. L&N records also show that six 4-4-0's (four by Rogers, two by Rhode Island) bought by the P&A in 1881-82 had originally belonged to the Mobile and Montgomery Railway, which was acquired by the L&N in 1881.

Running through a region of plentiful timber, the P&A used wood-burning locomotives until well after 1900, when the rest of the L&N system had long since converted to coal-burners.

=== Railroad connections ===
Through service from Pensacola to the state capital at Tallahassee [about 200 miles (320 km)] and on to the Atlantic Ocean port and major rail junction of Jacksonville [368 miles (592 km)] began during the first week in May 1883, via the connection at River Junction (Chattahoochee) with the Jacksonville, Pensacola and Mobile Railroad, later the Florida Central and Peninsular Railroad, a predecessor of the Seaboard Air Line Railroad (later CSX's Tallahassee Subdivision).

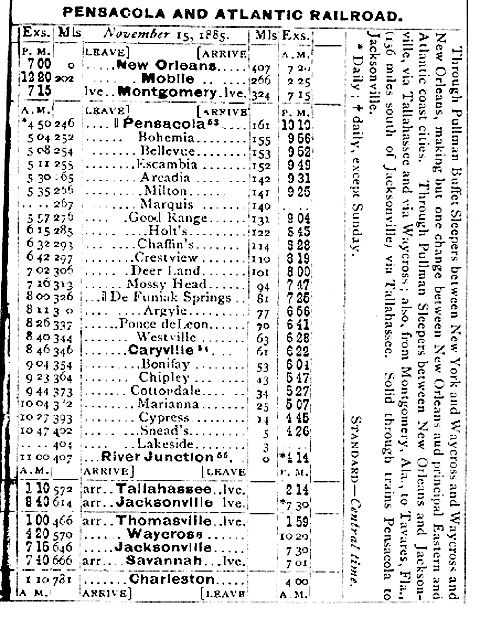
P&A passenger train schedule from 1885; average speed between Pensacola and River Junction was about 26 mph eastbound, 32 mph westbound. The journey took about six hours from one end of the line to the other.

Another trade and transportation link for Northwest Florida was provided by a branch of the Savannah, Florida and Western Railroad (a predecessor of the Atlantic Coast Line) from Chattahoochee to Climax, Georgia and thence to Savannah [420 miles (680 km)] from Pensacola, which, like Jacksonville, was an important ocean port and railroad junction for rail traffic on the eastern seaboard. Before the railroad was built, the only way for Pensacola rail traffic to reach Savannah or Jacksonville was by a long, circuitous route via Montgomery and Macon.

In the opposite direction, the P&A offered a through route for shipping and travel from southern Georgia and from central and southern Florida via the Louisville and Nashville to the ports and rail hubs of Mobile and New Orleans, and from there to Texas and points west.

The P&A acquired the Pensacola and Fort Barrancas Railroad in 1882.

In 1894, sawmill operator W. B. Wright opened the 26-mile (42 km) Yellow River Railroad between Crestview and Florala, Alabama via Auburn, Campton, and Laurel Hill. The L&N supplied the line with freight cars, and in 1906, purchased the operation.

In the first two decades of the 20th century, the P&A Division (by then long since known to the public as simply the L&N) was crossed by or connected to several small railroads, including the Atlanta and St. Andrew's Bay Railway (now the Bay Line Railroad), the Apalachicola Northern Railroad (now the AN Railway), and the Marianna and Blountstown Railroad. The Choctawhatchee and Northern Railroad was chartered in February 1927 to build a 28-mile (45 km) line from a point on the L&N east of Crestview south to Port Dixie (now Shalimar) on the Choctawhatchee Bay, but was never built. In the 1920s and 1930s, the short-lived Alabama and Western Florida Railway connected with the line at Chipley, Florida. The Marianna and Blountstown Railroad connected with the P&A at Marianna, Florida from 1909 to 1972.

An abandoned military railroad in Louisiana was moved to the Eglin Air Force Base reservation after World War II, connecting with the L&N at Mossy Head. This line, known as the Eglin Air Force Base Railroad, went into service on 1 February 1952 and was abandoned in the late 1970s.

In the later 20th century, the P&A route was used by L&N's Gulf Wind (1949–1971) and Amtrak's Sunset Limited (1993–2005). As a result of various railroad mergers and acquisitions between 1967 and 1986, CSX Transportation was the successor railroad that owned and operated the route for freight service as the P&A Subdivision of the Jacksonville Division of CSX from 1986 to 2019. CSX sold the P&A route to the Class III shortline Florida Gulf & Atlantic Railroad, which commenced operations on June 1, 2019.

U.S. Highway 90 and Interstate 10 run generally parallel to the P&A route across Northwest Florida, usually to the south of the railroad and sometimes adjacent to it.

== Effects on Northwest Florida ==
Although the interior of the Panhandle is still a largely rural area today, before the coming of the railroad it was practically a frontier wilderness, as J. D. Smith recollected:

In clearing the way for the railroad in this section, I became convinced that the railroad would never get expenses for the operation of its trains. I saw no encouragement here for development. The country was attractive only for its game and fish. In cutting the right-of-way through swamps we would cut timber down on deer sometimes. The principal industry was running logs down the rivers to go to Pensacola.

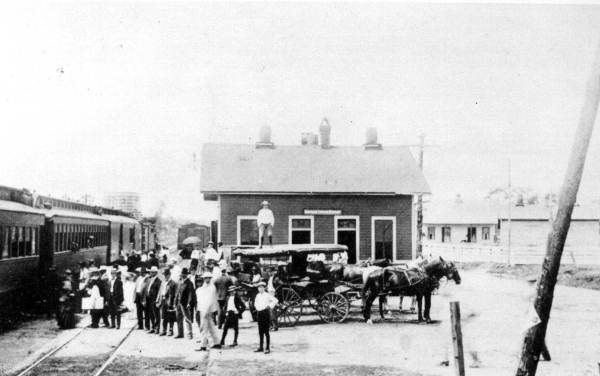
Another view of the P&A depot at Milton, with a crowd greeting the arrival of a train in the early 1900s.

The building of a railroad through the cypress swamps and dense pine forests of the Panhandle was a boon to the economy of Pensacola, which had a deep-water harbor (at the tine,the largest in Florida) for the development of port facilities and overseas shipping, but no direct railroad link to Atlantic ports and East Coast cities before 1883. According to Kincaid Herr, official historian of the Louisville and Nashville, "Much of the credit for the subsequent development of this section of Florida is due to the L&N. . . . a number of sawmills were built and turpentine began to be shipped in large quantities." Once the railroad had connected the area to the eastern parts of the nation and made possible the large-scale shipping of crops such as cotton as well as lumber and naval stores, a number of lumber companies arose to exploit the region's timber, some of them building short-line railroads to connect with the P&A Division.

=== Land grants ===
The P&A was a land grant railroad, like a number of other American railroads in the 19th century, having been granted 3,890,619 acres (15,745 km^{2}; 6,079 sq mi) of public land by its 1881 charter from the state of Florida as grantor for the United States Government. The grant was later reduced to 2,830,065 acres (11,453 km^{2}; 4,422 sq mi). The land had originally been given to Florida by the federal government through internal improvement acts in the 1850s for the purpose of promoting the building of railroads. The general intention of these grants was that by selling tracts of land to the public, the railroads would recoup the cost of construction and at the same time bring settlers to the railroad's territory, increasing both the population of the state as well as the freight and passenger business of the railroads.

According to J. D. Smith,

The state of Florida offered 23,000 acres per mile for the railroad construction in Florida, and others were building in South Florida as fast as possible in order to get the land there, for the P&A Railroad Company "got a move on" to rush this work before the East Coast and Plant got all the land, and this road was certainly rushing through.

The P&A, and other railroads, received a checkerboard pattern of alternate sections of land, six miles (10 km) on either side of the line, plus an additional 20,000 acres for every mile of railroad constructed, which included state lands extending into middle and south Florida, about one-fifteenth of the area of the state. After the P&A was absorbed by the L&N, William Chipley was named land commissioner by the latter, and oversaw the sale of the lands to the public. By 1897, the railroad had sold 995,481 acres (4,029 km^{2}; 1,555 sq mi) for a total of $860,343.65.

During its first fiscal year, ending in 1884, the Pensacola and Atlantic had revenues of $189,098 and received another $58,000 from land sales, which after deducting expenses left a net profit of $75,391; however, this was less than half the amount needed to cover the $180,000 it owed in bond interest to the Louisville and Nashville. Although the P&A line was not profitable for many years after its construction, the parent L&N covered the losses.

=== Towns and tourism ===
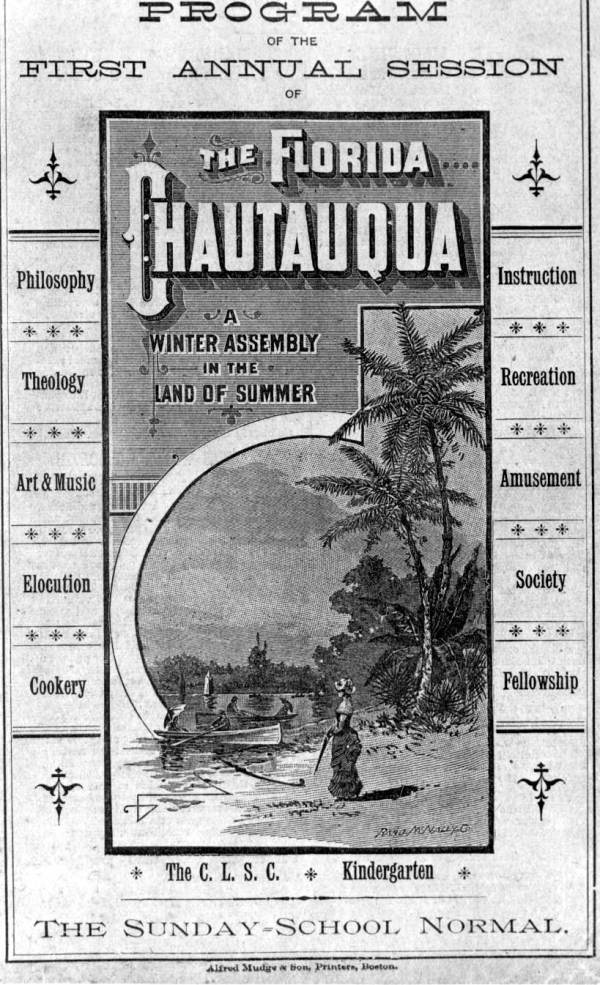
Program from the first Chautauqua held at De Funiak Springs, 1885

The line did, however, facilitate trade and travel into and out of the region, and directly spurred the establishment and growth of numerous towns along the route, including Crestview, DeFuniak Springs, Bonifay, Chipley, and Cottondale. The L&N also invested heavily in the development of the port of Pensacola for many decades, and the property taxes it paid in each county along the P&A line added to the local economy too.

One indirect result of the building of the P&A was the development of the annual Chautauqua assemblies at Lake DeFuniak, in the town of a similar name, De Funiak Springs which attracted thousands of visitors at the height of the Chautauqua movement, providing educational and cultural programs to residents and tourists. William Chipley led the organization of the first festival there in 1885, which would have been inaccessible before the advent of the railroad.

Special excursion trains brought throngs of visitors to De Funiak Springs on the P&A each year from as far away as New York and Chicago; a round-trip excursion fare from Chicago to De Funiak Springs cost $15 at this period.

== Historic stations ==
Milepost	City/Location	Station	Connections and notes
00K 650.6	Pensacola	Pensacola	junction with L&N
00K 656.8	Pensacola	Bohemia	
00K 657.8	Pensacola	Gull Point	
00K 658.6	Pensacola	Yniestra	originally Bellevue
00K 659.8		Escambia	
00K 663.3	Pace	Pace	
00K 667.3		Galt City	
00K 669.9		Arcadia	
00K 670.3	Milton	Milton	
00K 671.8		Marquis	
00K 680.0	Harold	Harold	originally Good Range
00K 681.2		Floridale	
00K 689.1		Holts	
00K 691.6		Galliver	
00K 696.6	Milligan	Milligan	originally Chafin's
00K 700.8	Crestview	Crestview	
00K 709.8	Deerland	Deerland	also spelled Deer Land on timetables
00K 716.5	Mossy Head	Mossy Head	junction with Eglin Air Force Base Railroad
00K 729.7	DeFuniak Springs	DeFuniak Springs	named for Frederick R. De Funiak, one of the P&A's founding officers
00K 734.4		Argyle	
00K 741.0	Ponce de Leon	Ponce De Leon	
00K 744.3	Westville	Westville	
00K 750.0	Caryville	Caryville	
00K 758.0	Bonifay	Bonifay	
00K 767.2	Chipley	Chipley	named for William D. Chipley, one of the P&A's founding officers
00K 776.7	Cottondale	Cottondale	junction with Bay Line Railroad
00K 785.9	Marianna	Marianna	
00K 796.6	Cypress	Cypress	
00K 801.5	Grand Ridge	Grand Ridge	
00K 807.5	Sneads	Snead's	
00K 809.3		Lakeside	
00K 811.5	Chattahoochee	River Junction	junction with: Florida Central and Western Railroad (FC&P/SAL); Chattahoochee and East Pass Railroad (SF&W/ACL)
