= Walton-DeFuniak Library =

- U.S. Historic district – Contributing property
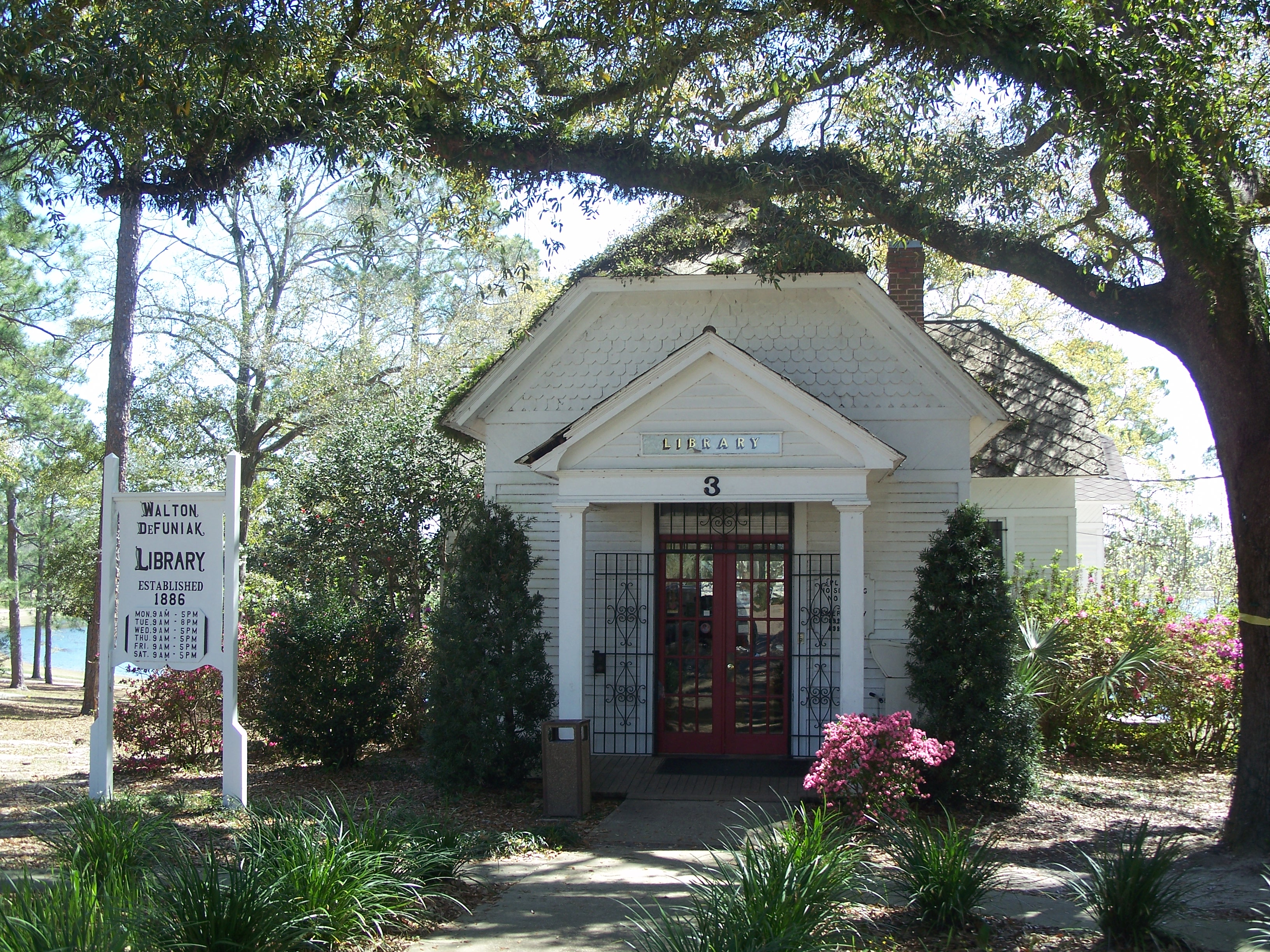
- Walton-DeFuniak Library, 2008
- Location: DeFuniak Springs, Florida
- Coordinates: 30°43′10″N 86°6′55″W
- Built: 1887
- Part of: DeFuniak Springs Historic District (ID92001048)

Walton-DeFuniak Library is a historic library located at 3 Circle Drive, in DeFuniak Springs, Walton County, Florida in the United States. Opened in 1887, it is the oldest continuously run library in the state. It is a contributing property in the DeFuniak Springs Historic District. The City of DeFuniak Springs and the commissioner’s office of the city donate funds to the Walton-DeFuniak library in order to keep the library running for patron benefit. While the original Walton-DeFuniak library was opened in 1886, there has been some debate as to exactly which library is the oldest in the state of Florida. Historians will say that the oldest library in Florida is actually located in St. Augustine.

In 1989, the library was listed in A Guide to Florida's Historic Architecture, published by the University of Florida Press.

There are over 25,000 volumes available at the Walton-DeFuniak Library.

== History ==
After the Chautauqua association had their first session in DeFuniak Springs, locals realized there was a need for library resources to support it. The creation of a library in the area would further contribute to the movement towards cultural and intellectual progress. The establishment of a railroad in the region increased exposure to the DeFuniak village as a developing area for educational, cultural, and social opportunities. Early writers saw this growth as a response to the cultural and educational needs of society, laying the foundation for theories of public library development based on democratic traditions or multiple social forces later associated prominently with Sidney Ditzion and Jesse Shera. The 1900 census revealed the DeFuniak Springs area experienced a population growth rate of 147 percent over a ten-year span. Local women raised 580 dollars in 1886–87 to build the library, and land on Lake DeFuniak for an annual rent of 25 cents. The local women who played such a large role in the creation of the library were a part of the Ladies' Aide Society, later called the Ladies' Library Association. The DeFuniak Library officially opened on December 20, 1887 as a new expansion for the Florida Chautauqua Resort/Campus. The members earned money for books and kept the library opened until 1902, when an official librarian was hired. Alice Fellows became the first salaried librarian of Walton-Defuniak Library from 1896 to 1926. The library opened to the public on December 20, 1887. The library was sustained by subscription payments from members until the 1960s when the local government took over the financial responsibility to maintain the facility. The name was changed in 1975 to the Walton-DeFuniak library. In 1984, a rear section was added which blends architecturally with the original hardware-frame building.

The library was one of two Florida libraries that applied and was awarded a famed and sought after Carnegie grant, but had to decline the offer. Alice Fellows, in a newspaper article stated, "In 1910, W.W. Flourney secured for us the promise of $10,000 Carnegie. The offer was made again six years later, but the city needed other improvements which were considered more essential." The reciprocation of additional funds for the upkeep of the new library was a requirement for the receiving of a Carnegie grant.

The library was named in honor of Captain Frederick de Funiak, as was the village DeFuniak Springs in 1882.

== Weapons collection ==
The library is also home to a collection of antique arms and armor originally owned by Palmer College's Professor Kenneth Bruce. His father, Wallace Bruce was appointed as a U.S. Consul in Scotland and the family lived in Edinburgh from 1889 to 1893, during this time Kenneth Bruce would begin to collect armor. Together Wallace and Kenneth Bruce would grow the collection, adding more items as they traveled around the world. As both father and son had been professors at Palmer College, one of the earliest established institutions in the area, the collection would be displayed and ultimately willed to the college by Kenneth Bruce after his death in 1916. The collection remained at Palmer College until it closed in 1936, when it was turned over to the city to pay off part of the college's debts. The collection would be housed at the DeFuniak Springs City Hall until 1945, when there was a fire at the city hall which the collection survived. After this point the collection would find itself in different areas of Walton County, from a corner of the old fire station to the Walton County High School Anchor Club in the 1960s, before its arrival at the library in 1984.

The collection holds over a hundred weapons and pieces of armor. Although there is no documentation to go along with the items, through research and the help of knowledgeable visitors interested in weapons, it has become possible to identify the country and estimated dates of origin for several items on display. Among the items found in the collection are Japanese handguns, African spears, and European helmets. A large number of the weapons are European and from the era of the Crusades. There are also many others from the Orient, as well as Kentucky muskets from the 18th century.

== See also ==
- DeFuniak Springs Historic District
