= National Register of Historic Places listings in Florida =

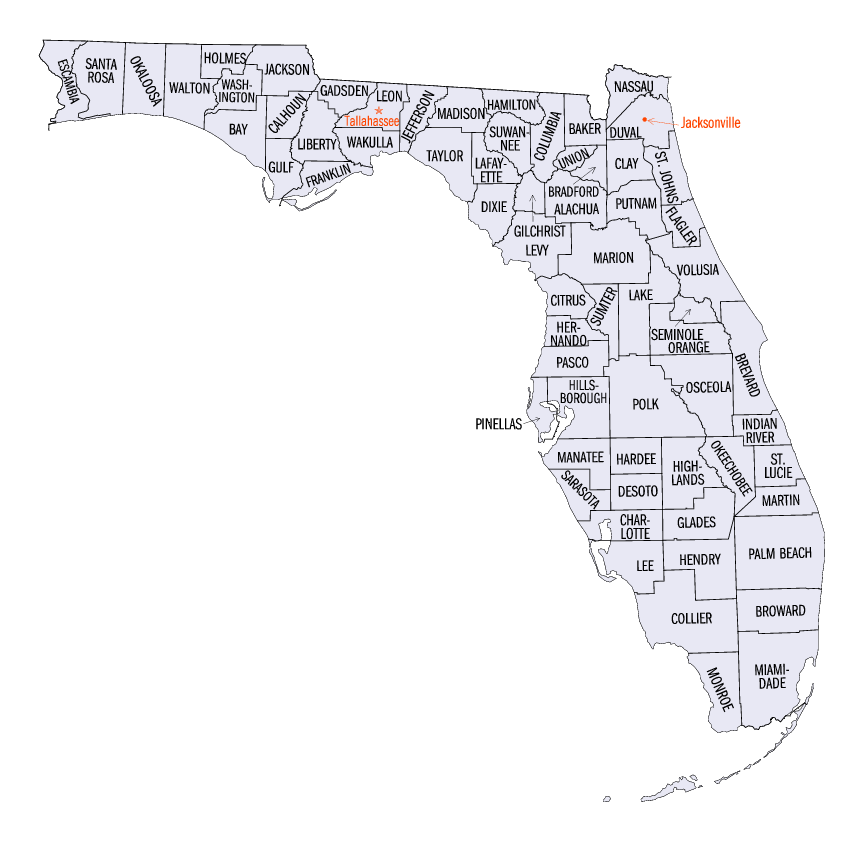
Florida counties (clickable map)

There are more than 1,900 properties and districts listed on the National Register of Historic Places in Florida. They are distributed through 66 of the state's 67 counties. Of these, 42 are National Historic Landmarks.

This National Park Service list is complete through NPS recent listings posted October 30, 2026.

Contents: Counties in Florida (non-linked contain no National Register listings)
Alachua - Baker - Bay - Bradford - Brevard - Broward - Calhoun - Charlotte - Citrus - Clay - Collier - Columbia - DeSoto - Dixie - Duval - Escambia - Flagler - Franklin - Gadsden - Gilchrist - Glades - Gulf - Hamilton - Hardee - Hendry - Hernando - Highlands - Hillsborough (Tampa) - Holmes - Indian River - Jackson - Jefferson - Lafayette - Lake - Lee - Leon - Levy - Liberty - Madison - Manatee - Marion - Martin - Miami-Dade (Miami) - Monroe - Nassau - Okaloosa - Okeechobee - Orange - Osceola - Palm Beach - Pasco - Pinellas - Polk - Putnam - St. Johns - St. Lucie - Santa Rosa - Sarasota - Seminole - Sumter - Suwannee - Taylor - Union - Volusia - Wakulla - Walton - Washington

== Numbers of listings by county ==
The following are approximate tallies of current listings in Florida on the National Register of Historic Places. These counts are based on entries in the National Register Information Database as of April 20, 2018 and new weekly listings posted since then on the National Register of Historic Places website. There are frequent additions to the listings and occasional delistings and the counts here are not official. Also, the counts in this table exclude boundary increase and decrease listings which modify the area covered by an existing property or district and that have a separate National Register reference number.

NRHP distribution, as of January 2025

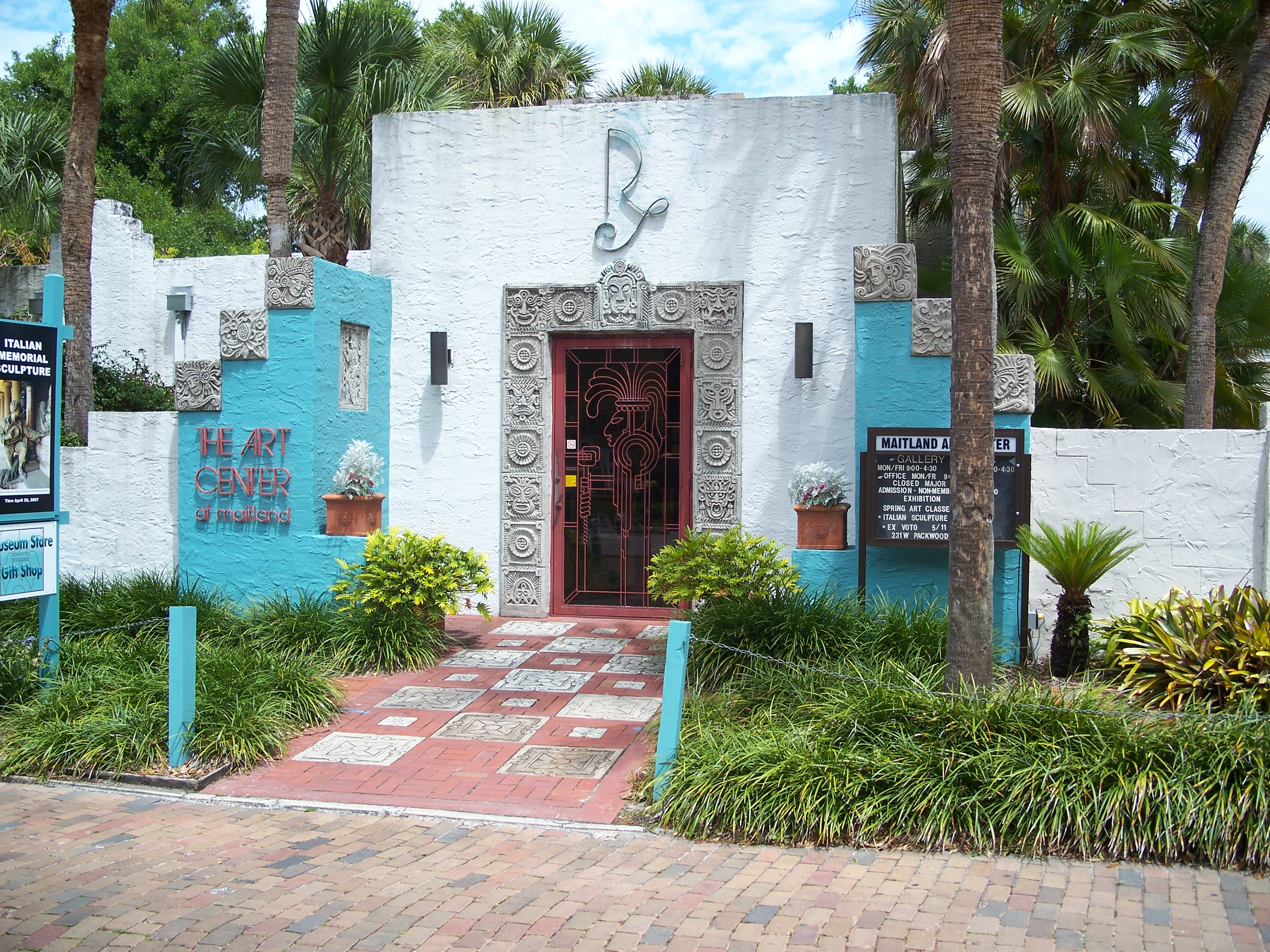
Maitland Art Center

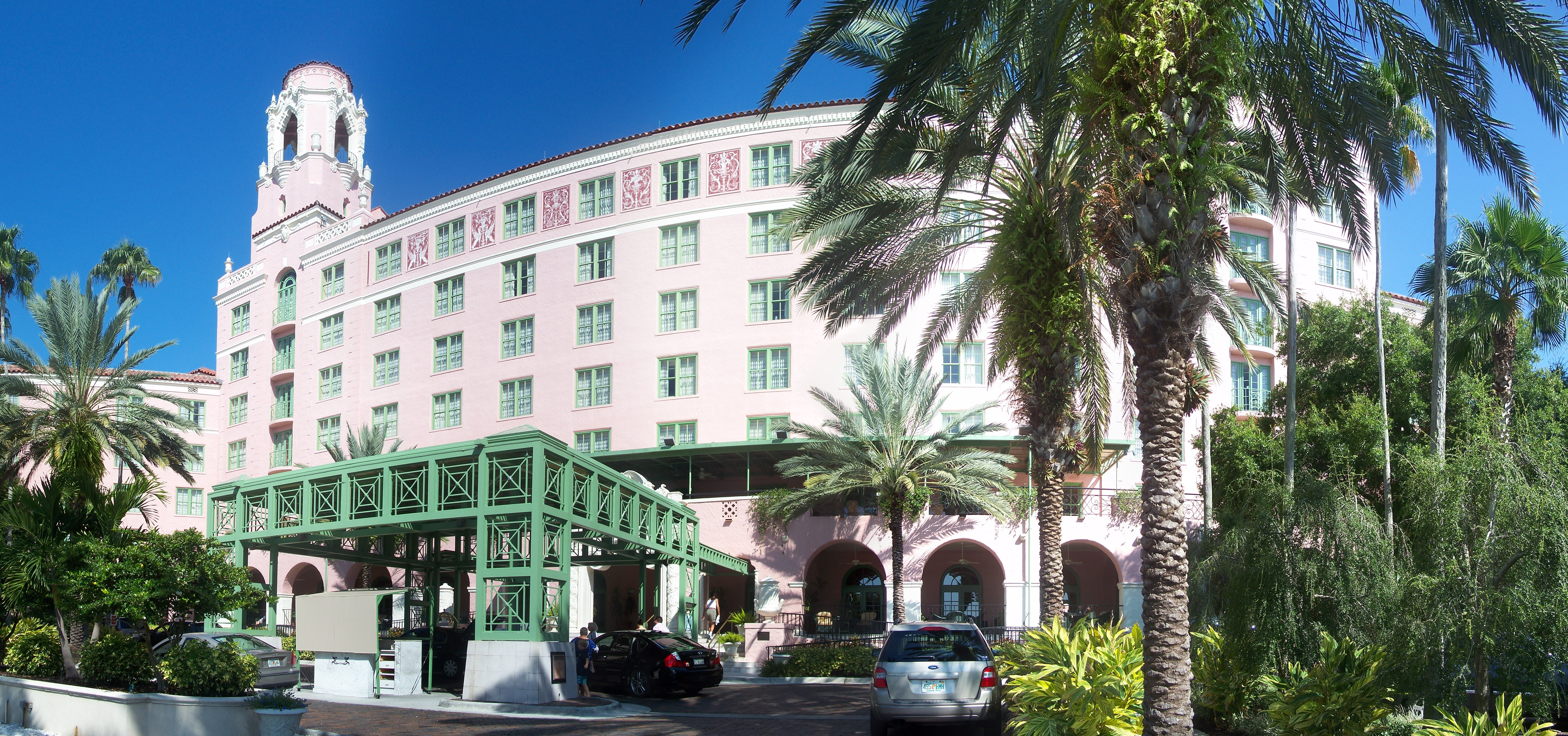
Vinoy Park Hotel

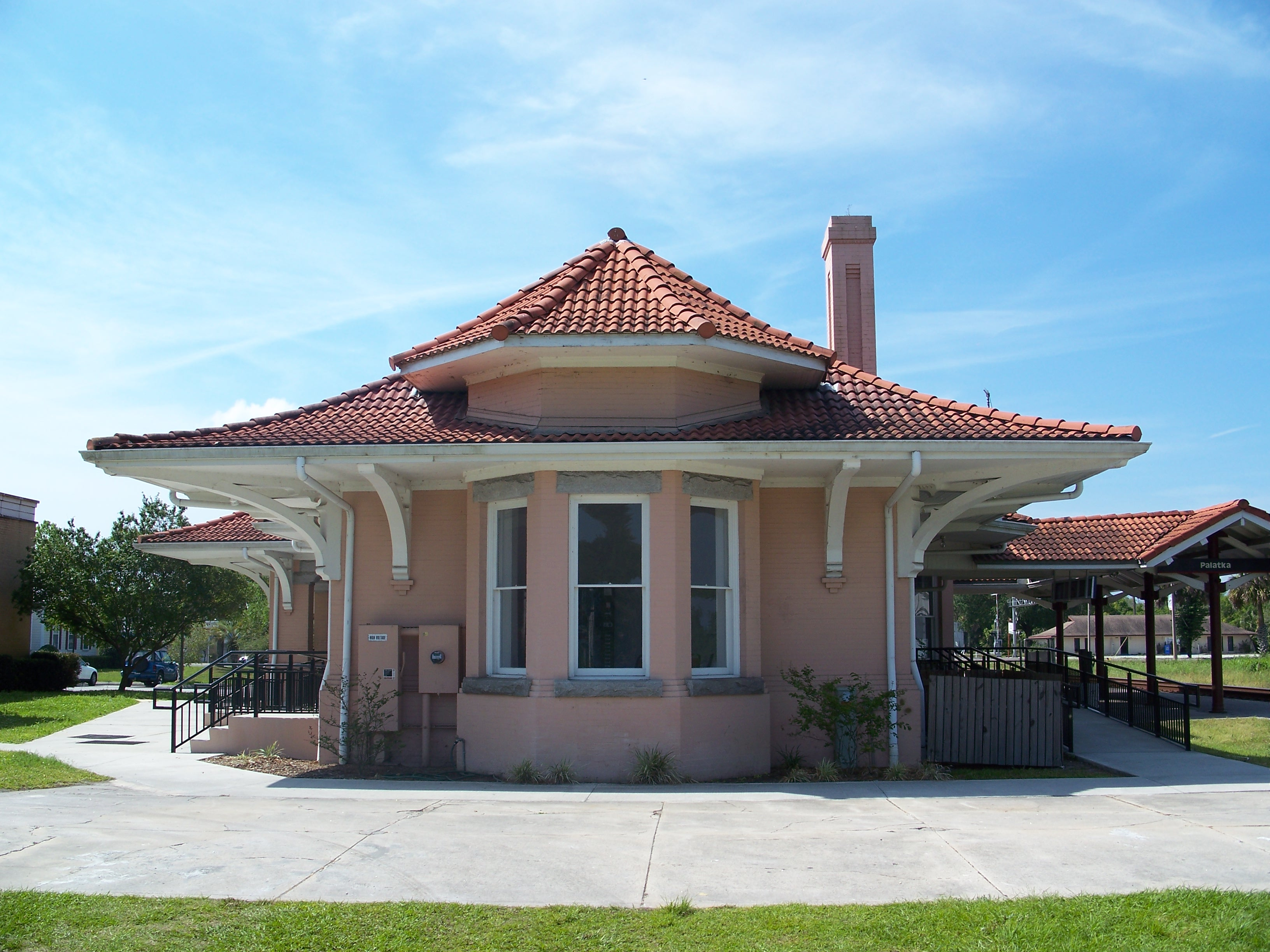
Old A.C.L. Union Depot

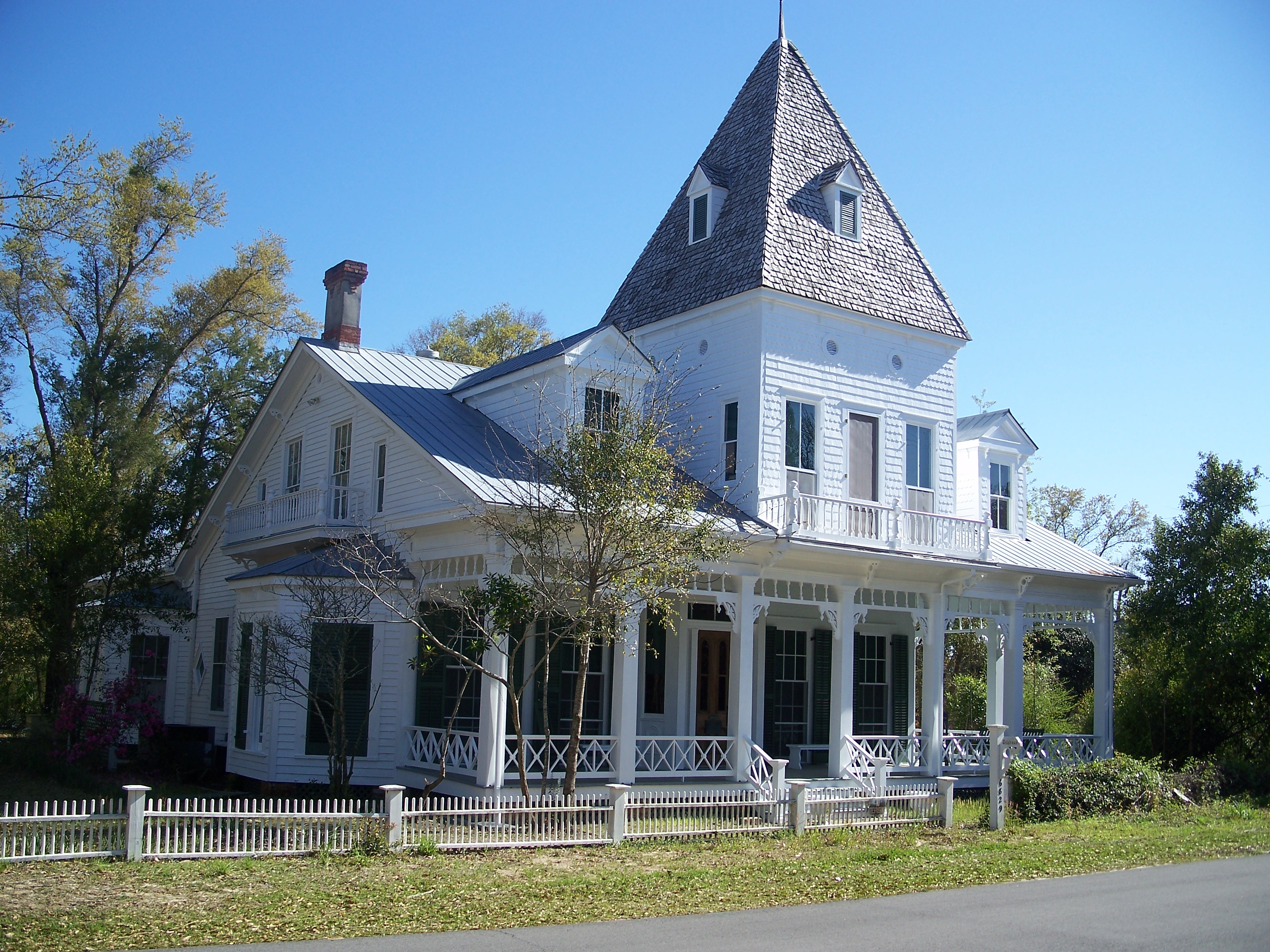
Ollinger-Cobb House

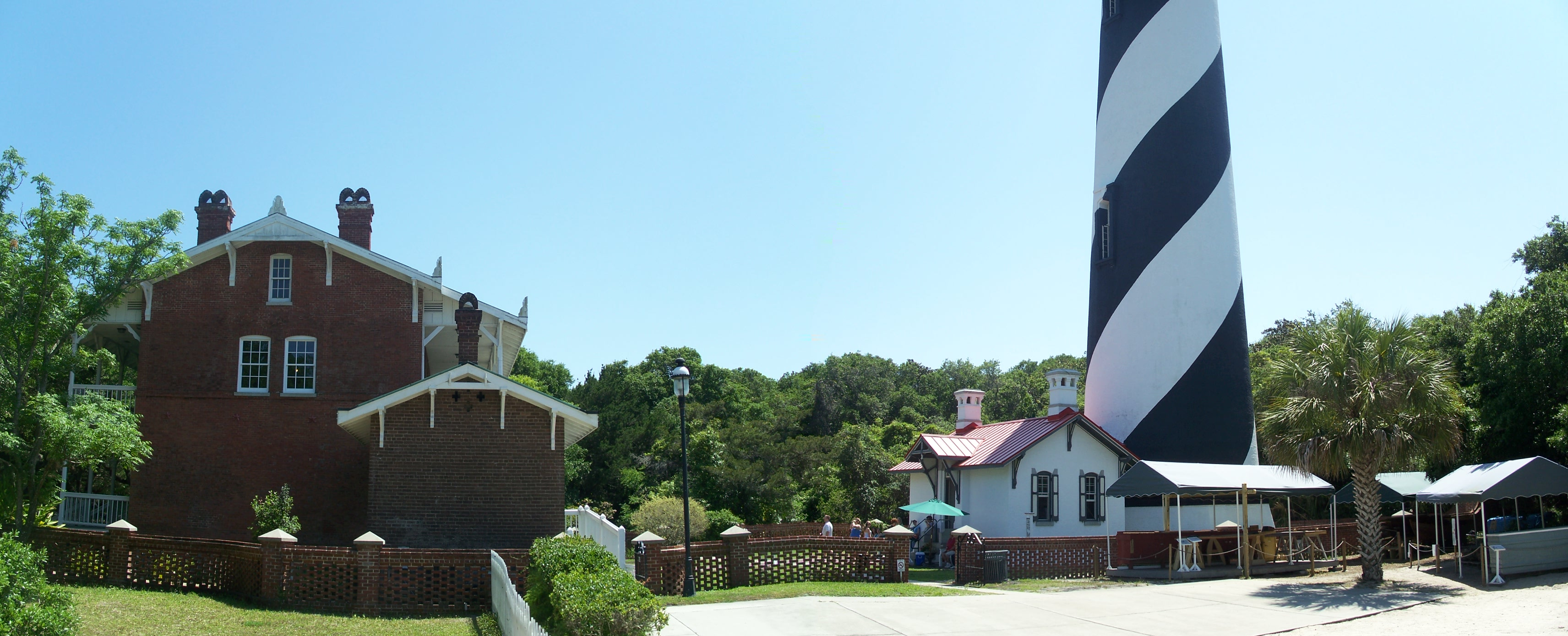
St. Augustine Lighthouse and Keeper's Quarters

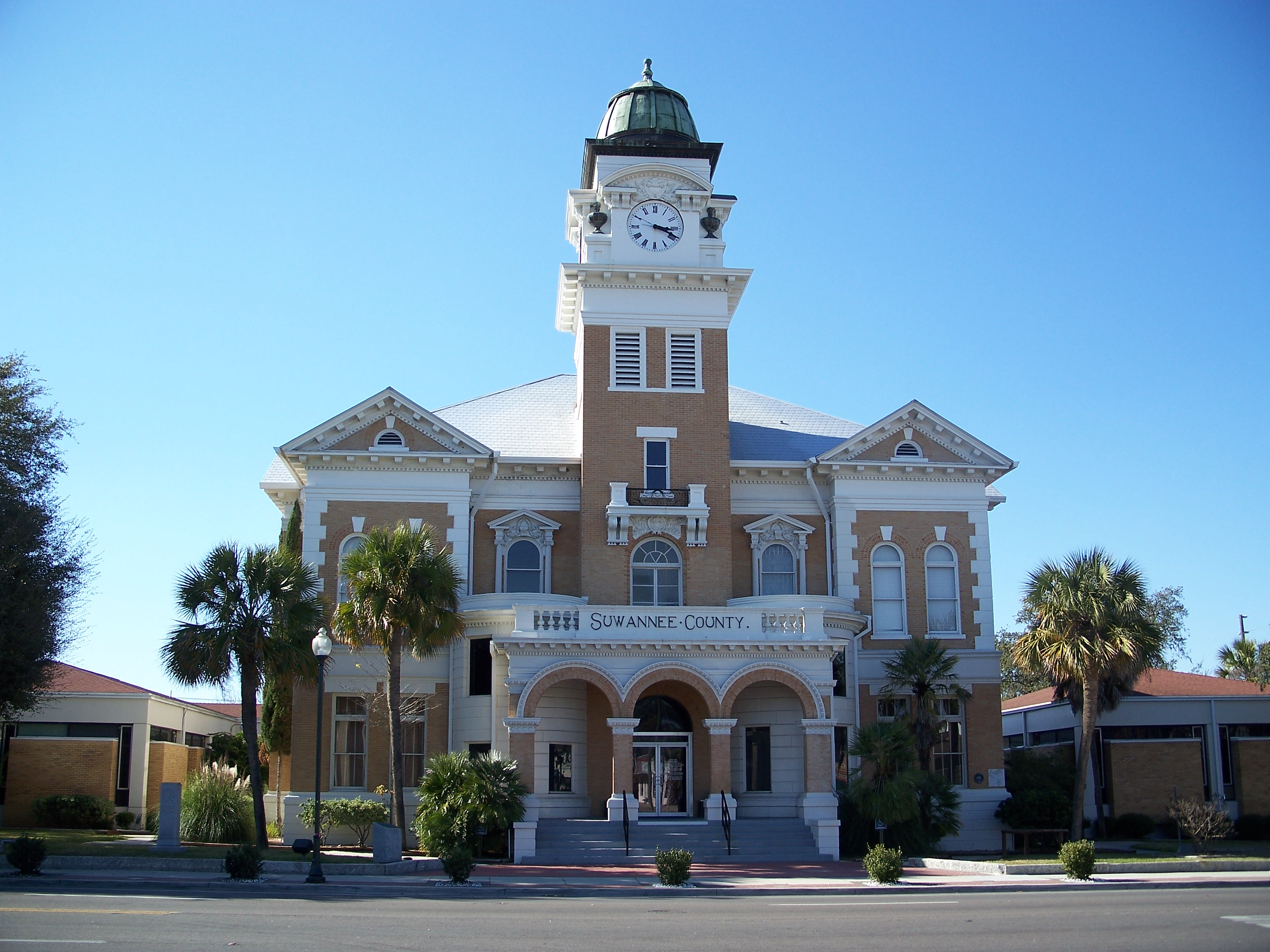
Suwannee County Courthouse

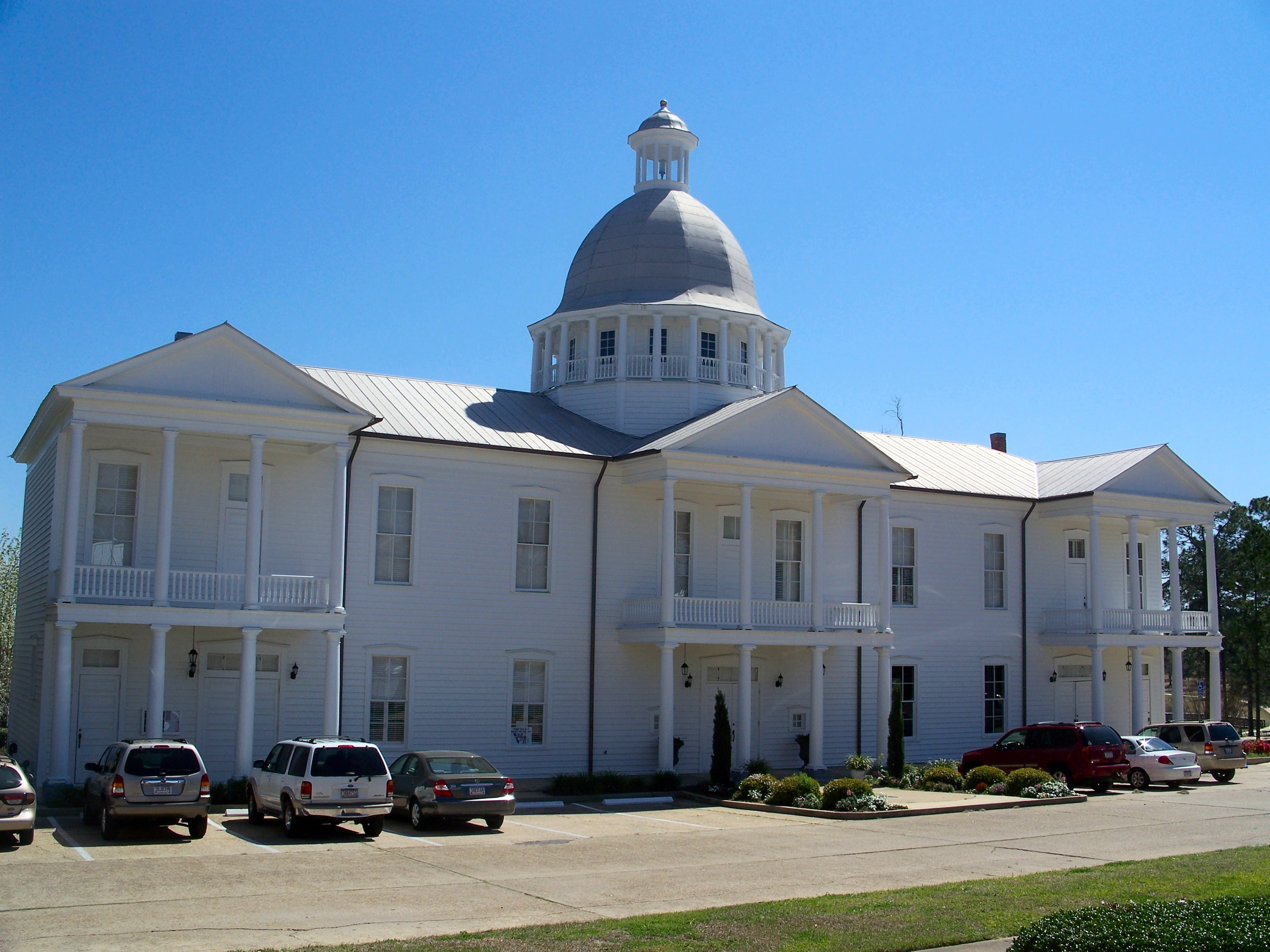
Chautauqua Hall of Brotherhood

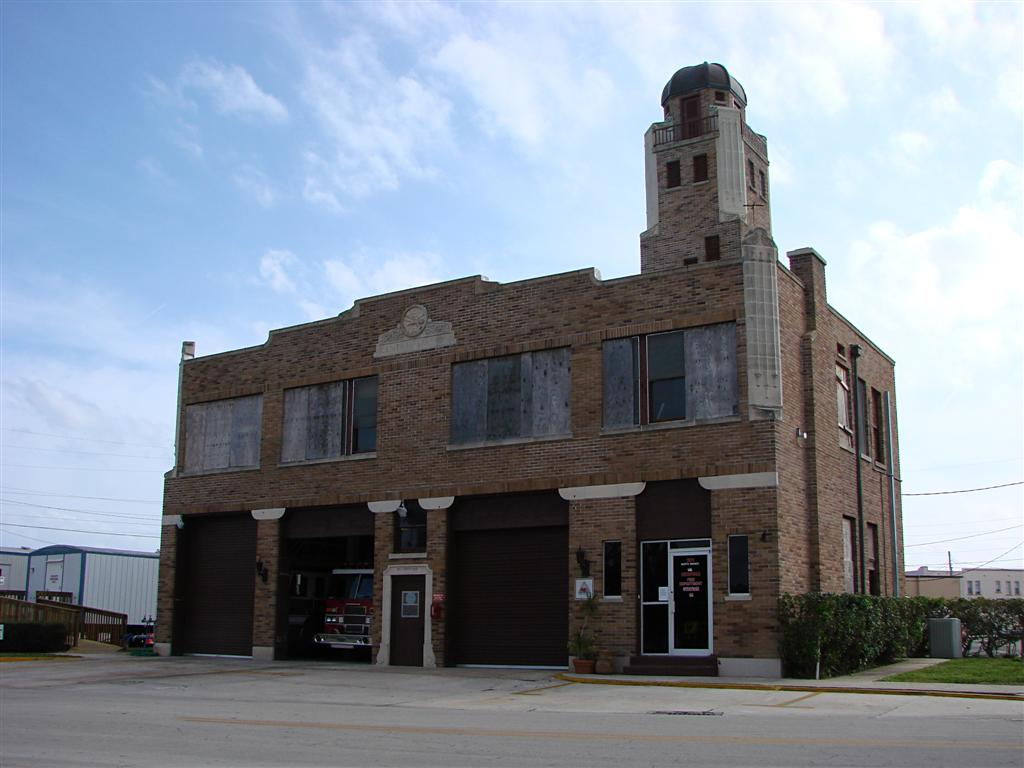
Central Station

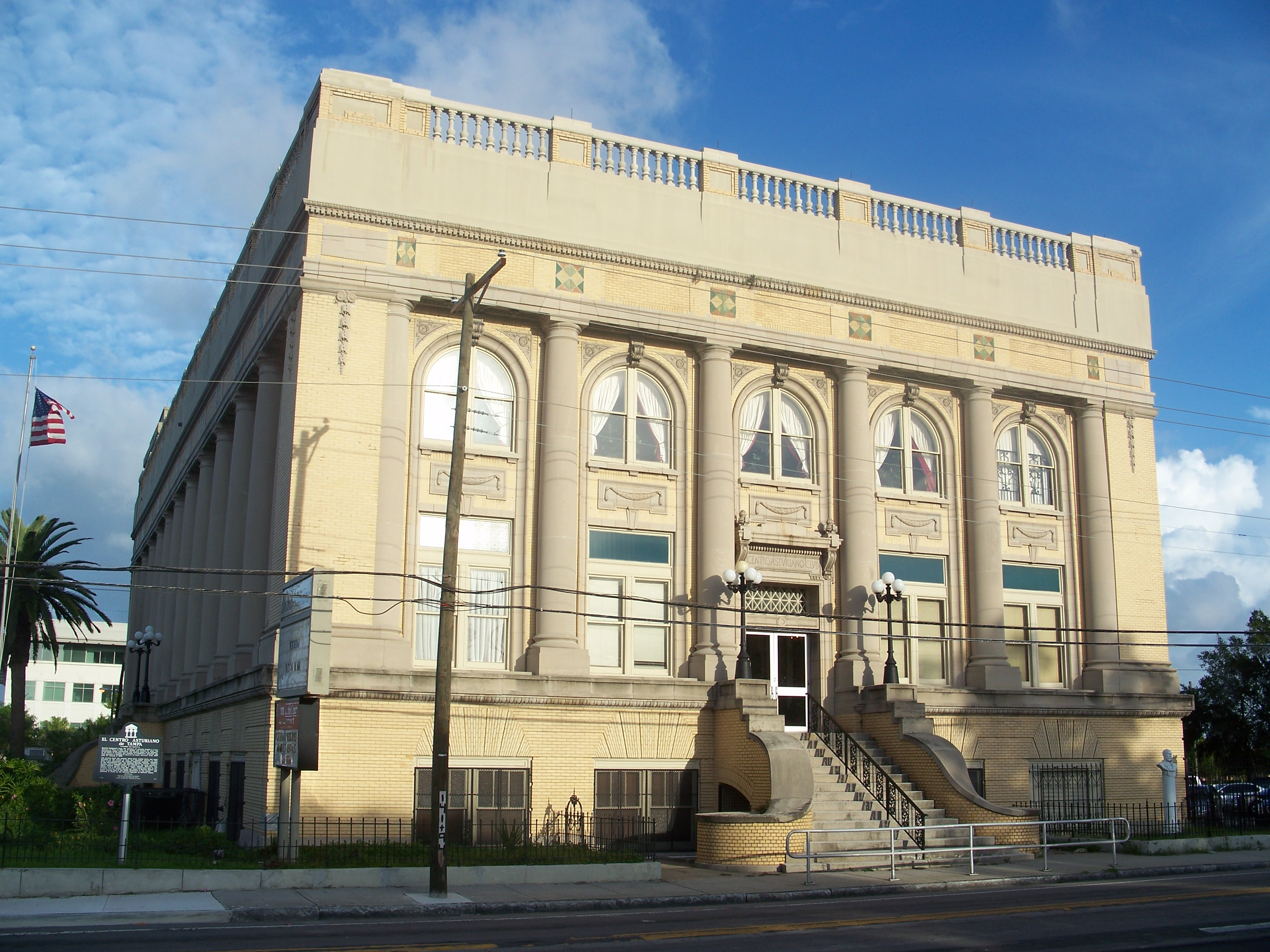
Centro Asturiano

	County	# of Sites	# of NHLs
1	Alachua	68	2
2	Baker	4	0
3	Bay	13	1
4	Bradford	3	0
5	Brevard	43	2
6	Broward	40	0
7	Calhoun	2	0
8	Charlotte	17	0
9	Citrus	10	1
10	Clay	24	0
11	Collier	19	0
12	Columbia	13	0
13	DeSoto	5	0
14	Dixie	2	0
15	Duval	111	2
16	Escambia	42	3
17	Flagler	13	0
18	Franklin	11	1
19	Gadsden	18	0
20	Gilchrist	2	0
21	Glades	3	0
22	Gulf	4	0
23	Hamilton	5	0
24	Hardee	3	0
25	Hendry	12	0
26	Hernando	10	0
27	Highlands	17	0
28.1	Hillsborough: Tampa	79	3
28.2	Hillsborough: Other	22	0
28.3	Hillsborough: Total	101	3
29	Holmes	2	0
30	Indian River	32	1
31	Jackson	13	0
32	Jefferson	24	0
33	Lafayette	0	0
34	Lake	32	0
35	Lee	58	0
36	Leon	71	1
37	Levy	4	0
38	Liberty	4	0
39	Madison	9	0
40	Manatee	33	0
41	Marion	33	1
42	Martin	15	0
43.1	Miami-Dade: Miami	81	5
43.2	Miami-Dade: Other	117	1
43.3	Miami-Dade: Duplicates	2	0
43.4	Miami-Dade: Total	195	6
44	Monroe	58	4
45	Nassau	15	0
46	Okaloosa	9	1
47	Okeechobee	3	1
48	Orange	58	1
49	Osceola	10	0
50	Palm Beach	75	2
51	Pasco	11	0
52	Pinellas	76	1
53	Polk	77	2
54	Putnam	24	0
55	Santa Rosa	17	0
56	Sarasota	103	0
57	Seminole	19	0
54	St. Johns	56	6
59	St. Lucie	16	1
60	Sumter	4	1
61	Suwannee	7	0
62	Taylor	4	0
63	Union	4	0
64	Volusia	107	2
65	Wakulla	11	1
66	Walton	7	0
67	Washington	5	0
(duplicates)		(2)	0
Total:		1,913	47

== See also ==
- Florida Underwater Archaeological Preserve
- List of botanical gardens and arboretums in Florida
- List of Florida state parks
- List of historical societies in Florida
- List of National Historic Landmarks in Florida
- List of lighthouses in Florida
- List of Woman's Clubhouses in Florida on the National Register of Historic Places
- National Register of Historic Places Multiple Property Submissions in Florida
- List of bridges on the National Register of Historic Places in Florida
