= National Register of Historic Places listings in Holmes County, Florida =

Location of Holmes County in Florida

This is intended to be a detailed table of the properties on the National Register of Historic Places in Holmes County, Florida, United States. The location of the National Register property for which the latitude and longitude coordinates are included below, may be seen in a map.

There are 2 properties listed on the National Register in the county.

This National Park Service list is complete through NPS recent listings posted January 9, 2026.

Contents: Counties in Florida (non-linked contain no National Register listings)
Alachua - Baker - Bay - Bradford - Brevard - Broward - Calhoun - Charlotte - Citrus - Clay - Collier - Columbia - DeSoto - Dixie - Duval - Escambia - Flagler - Franklin - Gadsden - Gilchrist - Glades - Gulf - Hamilton - Hardee - Hendry - Hernando - Highlands - Hillsborough (Tampa) - Holmes - Indian River - Jackson - Jefferson - Lafayette - Lake - Lee - Leon - Levy - Liberty - Madison - Manatee - Marion - Martin - Miami-Dade (Miami) - Monroe - Nassau - Okaloosa - Okeechobee - Orange - Osceola - Palm Beach - Pasco - Pinellas - Polk - Putnam - St. Johns - St. Lucie - Santa Rosa - Sarasota - Seminole - Sumter - Suwannee - Taylor - Union - Volusia - Wakulla - Walton - Washington

== Current listing ==
| | Name on the Register | Image | Date listed | Location | City or town | Description |
|---|---|---|---|---|---|---|
| 1 | Downtown Bonifay Historic District | Downtown Bonifay Historic District | June 2, 2020 (#100005242) | Nebraska Ave.; Oklahoma Ave.; Evans Ave.; Martin St., & Etheridge St. 30°47′36″N 85°40′47″W | Bonifay | |
| 2 | Keith Cabin | Keith Cabin | November 2, 2000 (#00001281) | 1320 State Road 179; 30°56′13″N 85°49′26″W | Bethlehem | |

== See also ==
- List of National Historic Landmarks in Florida
- National Register of Historic Places listings in Florida
