= National Register of Historic Places listings in Calhoun County, Florida =

Location of Calhoun County in Florida

This is a list of the National Register of Historic Places listings in Calhoun County, Florida.

This is intended to be a complete list of the properties on the National Register of Historic Places in Calhoun County, Florida, United States. The locations of National Register properties for which the latitude and longitude coordinates are included below, may be seen in a map.

There are 2 properties listed on the National Register in the county.

This National Park Service list is complete through NPS recent listings posted March 21, 2025.

Contents: Counties in Florida (non-linked contain no National Register listings)
Alachua - Baker - Bay - Bradford - Brevard - Broward - Calhoun - Charlotte - Citrus - Clay - Collier - Columbia - DeSoto - Dixie - Duval - Escambia - Flagler - Franklin - Gadsden - Gilchrist - Glades - Gulf - Hamilton - Hardee - Hendry - Hernando - Highlands - Hillsborough (Tampa) - Holmes - Indian River - Jackson - Jefferson - Lafayette - Lake - Lee - Leon - Levy - Liberty - Madison - Manatee - Marion - Martin - Miami-Dade (Miami) - Monroe - Nassau - Okaloosa - Okeechobee - Orange - Osceola - Palm Beach - Pasco - Pinellas - Polk - Putnam - St. Johns - St. Lucie - Santa Rosa - Sarasota - Seminole - Sumter - Suwannee - Taylor - Union - Volusia - Wakulla - Walton - Washington

== Current listings ==
	Name on the Register	Image	Date listed	Location	City or town	Description
1	Cayson Mound and Village Site		March 15, 1976 (#76000587)	Address Restricted	Blountstown	
2	Old Calhoun County Courthouse	Old Calhoun County Courthouse	October 16, 1980 (#80000943)	314 East Central Avenue; 30°26′32″N 85°02′46″W	Blountstown	

== See also ==
- List of National Historic Landmarks in Florida
- National Register of Historic Places listings in Florida
