= Magnolia Cemetery (DeFuniak Springs, Florida) =

Cemetery in Walton County, Florida

Coordinates: 30.72322°N 86.09841°W

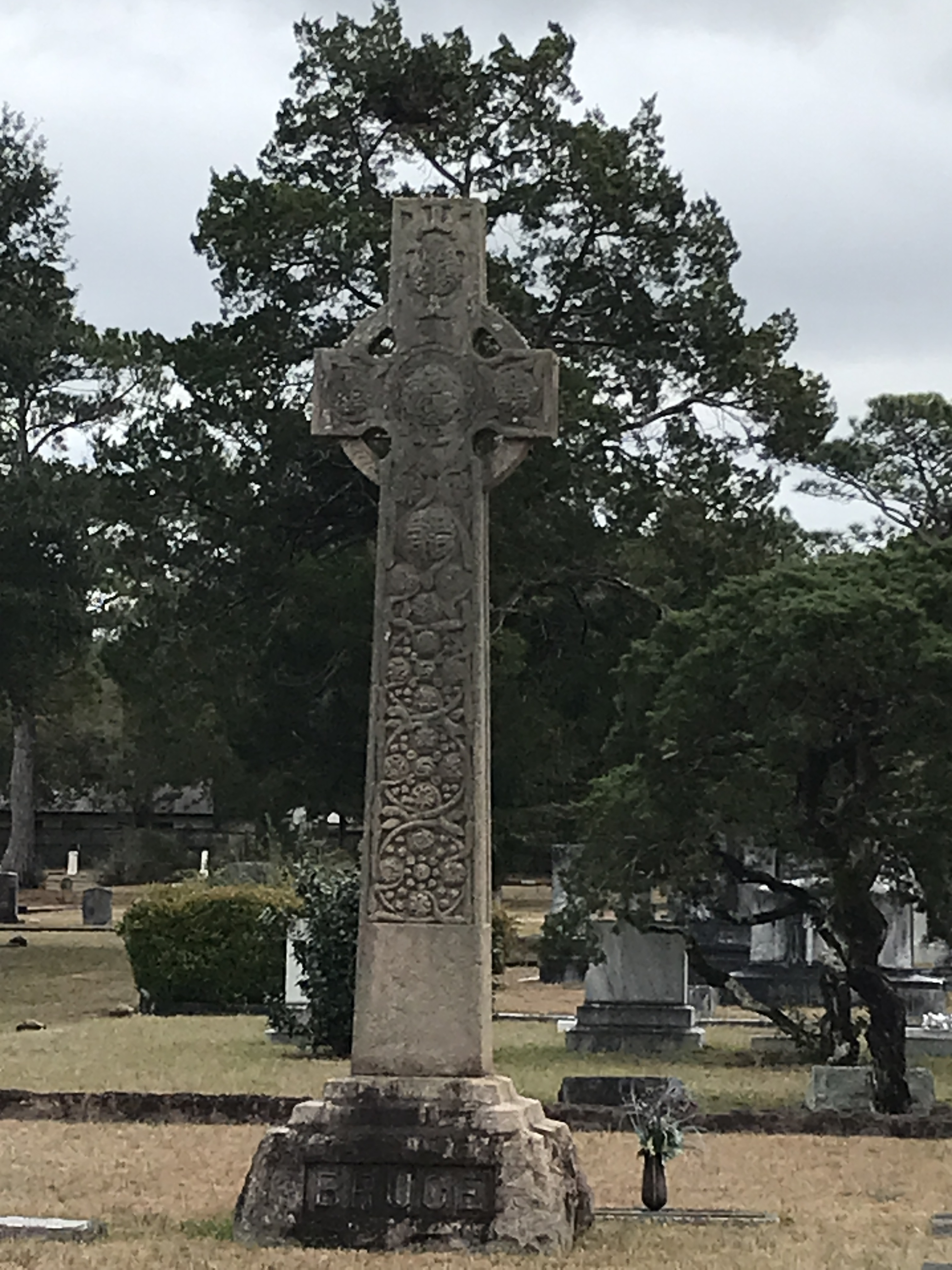
- Celtic Cross in Magnolia Cemetery
- Interactive map of Magnolia Cemetery

Details
- Location: 222 North Park Street, DeFuniak Springs, Florida, US

Magnolia Cemetery is a cemetery in the Northeast part of DeFuniak Springs, Florida, United States. It is located at 222 North Park Street next to Pat Covell Park #2.
