= Perry L. Biddle House =

Historic house in Florida, United States

- U.S. National Register of Historic Places
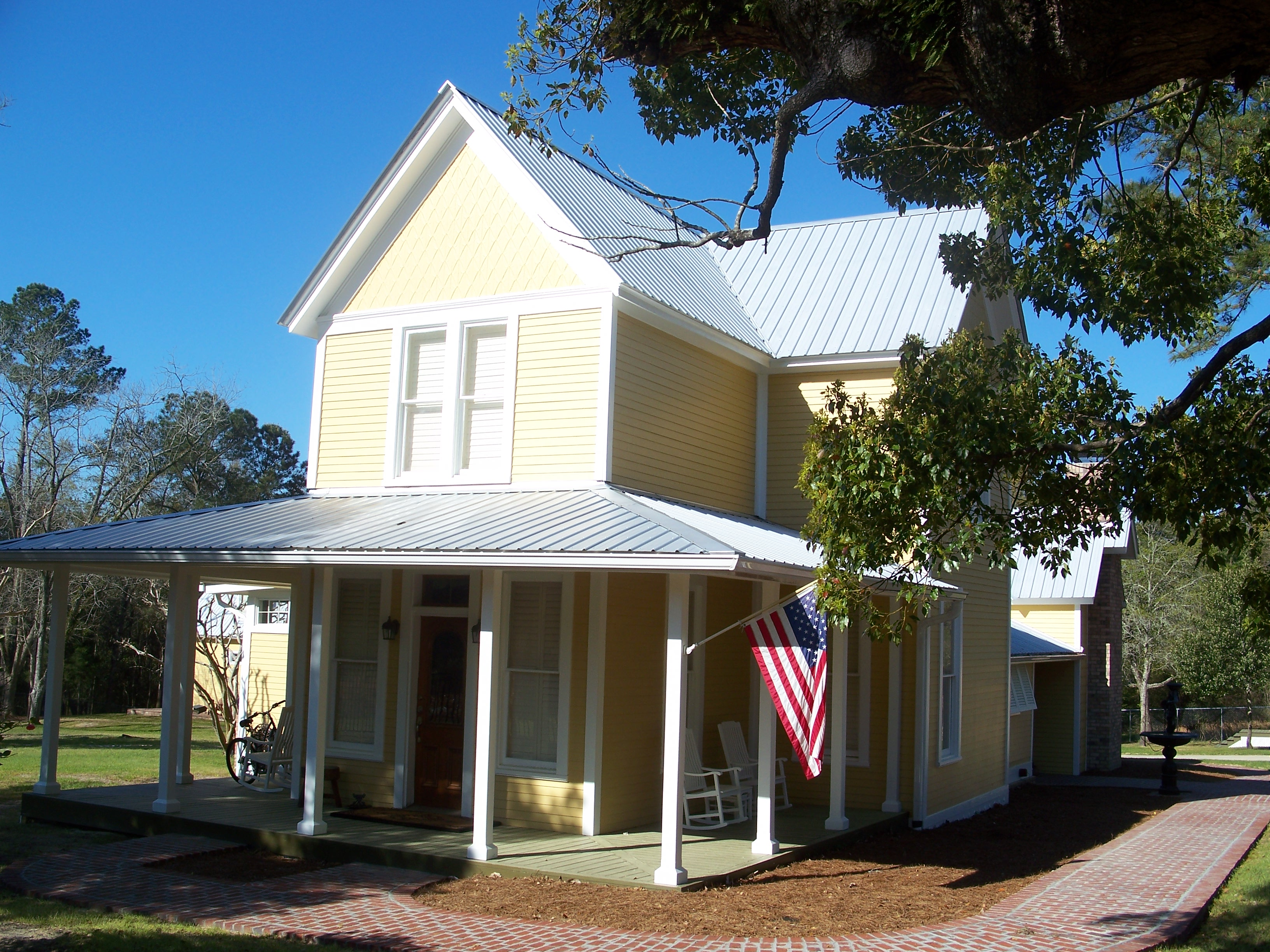

- Location within Florida
- Location: DeFuniak Springs, Florida, United States
- Coordinates: 30°43′13″N 86°7′12″W
- Built: 1887
- Architectural style: Frame Vernacular
- NRHP reference No.: 92001049
- Added to NRHP: August 28, 1992

The Perry L. Biddle House is a historic house located at 203 Scribner Avenue in DeFuniak Springs, Florida, United States. It is locally significant as one of the best examples of the houses constructed in an early subdivision of DeFuniak Springs, outside of the heavy development which took place around Lake DeFuniak, and is also a good example of Frame Vernacular construction.

== Description and history ==
It was built in 1887 by Perry L. Biddle, who settled in DeFuniak Springs about 1886. The house is a large symmetrical design that displays a cross gable roof with a simple frieze that encircles the building. The original, two-story primary unit has the shape of a MT," and a roof covered with tin standing seam panels, which appear to have replaced the original pressed-metal shingles.

It was added to the National Register of Historic Places on August 28, 1992.

== Gallery ==
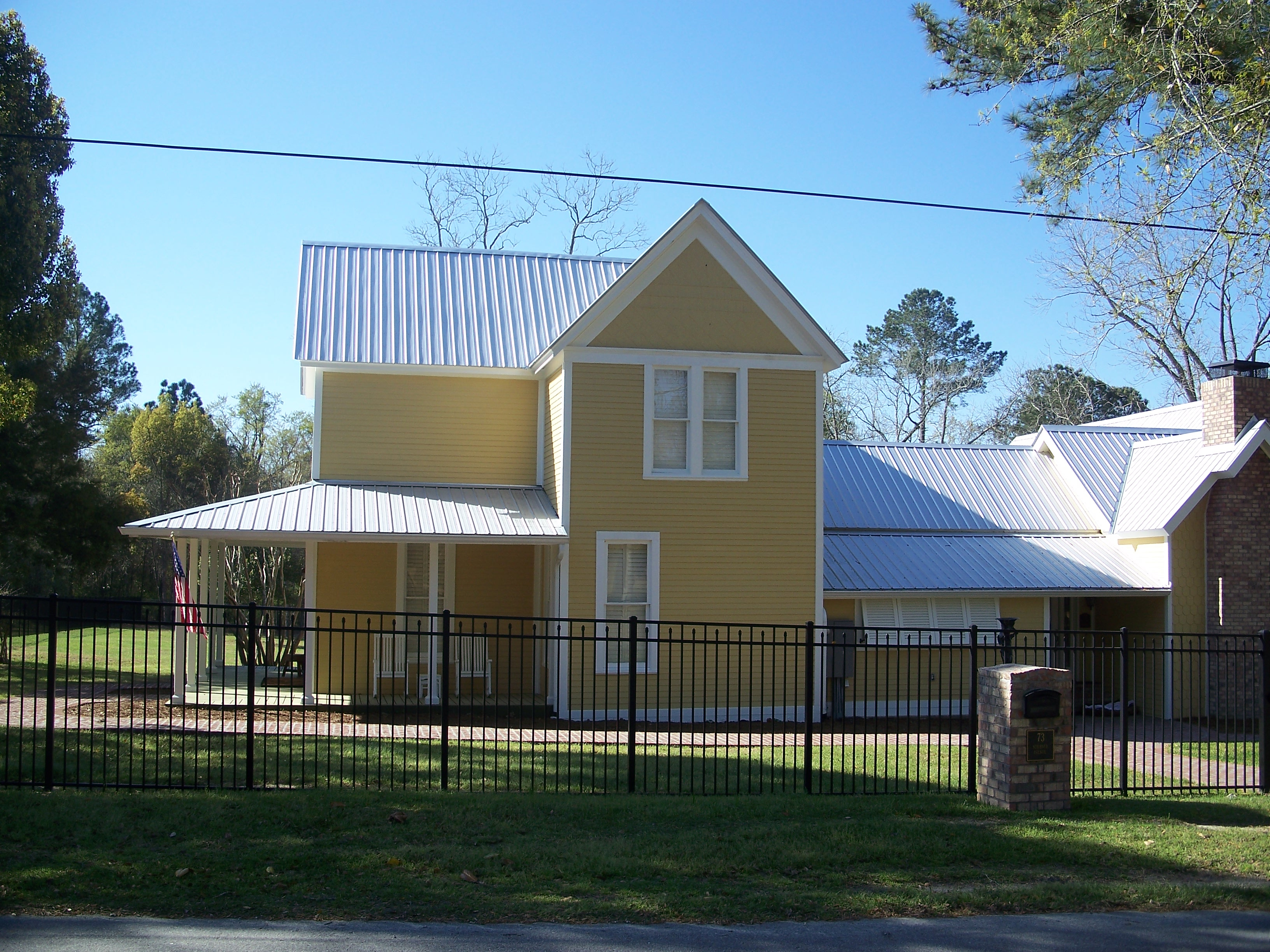

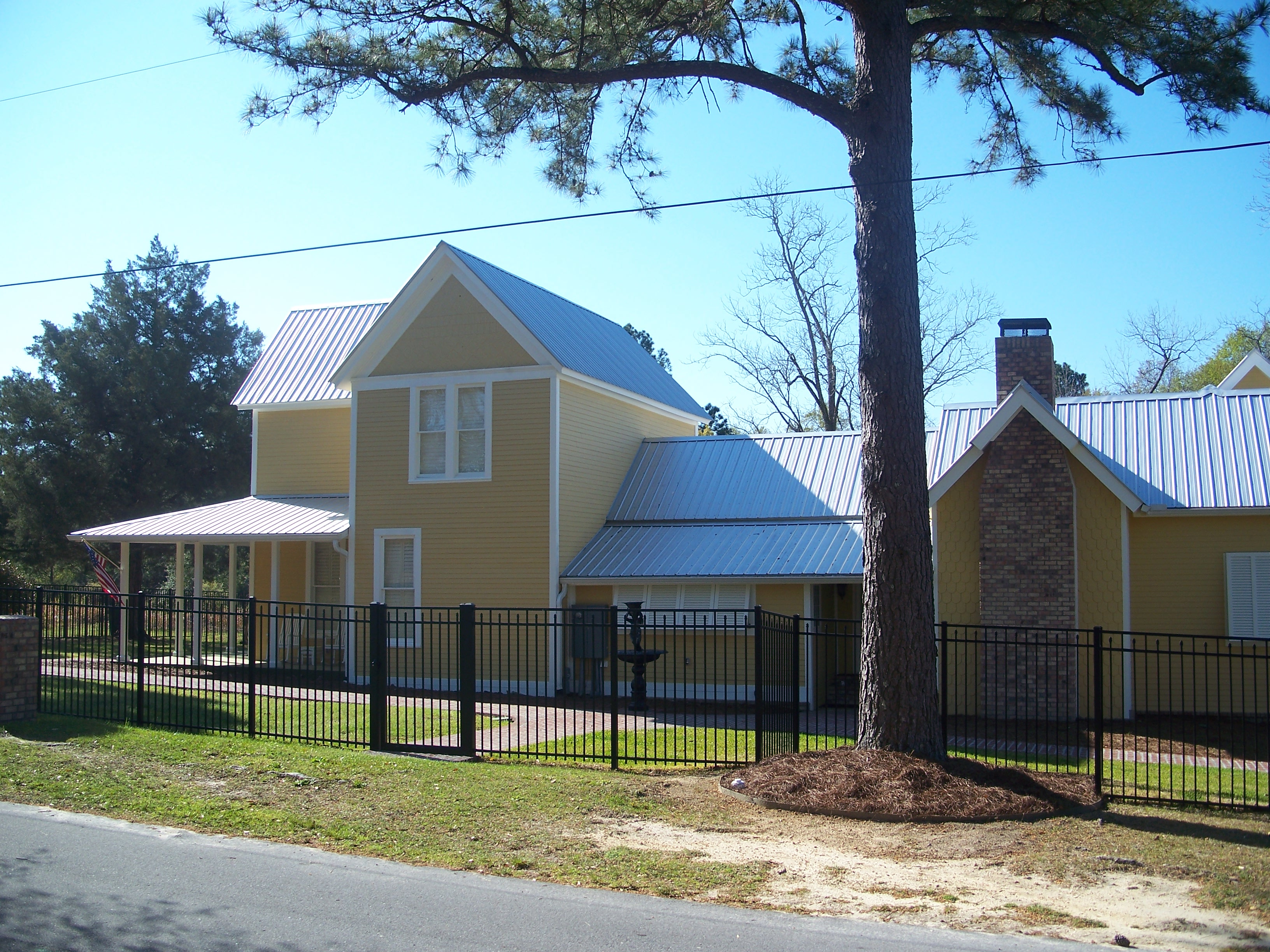
