= Sun Bright =

Historic house in Florida, United States

- U.S. National Register of Historic Places
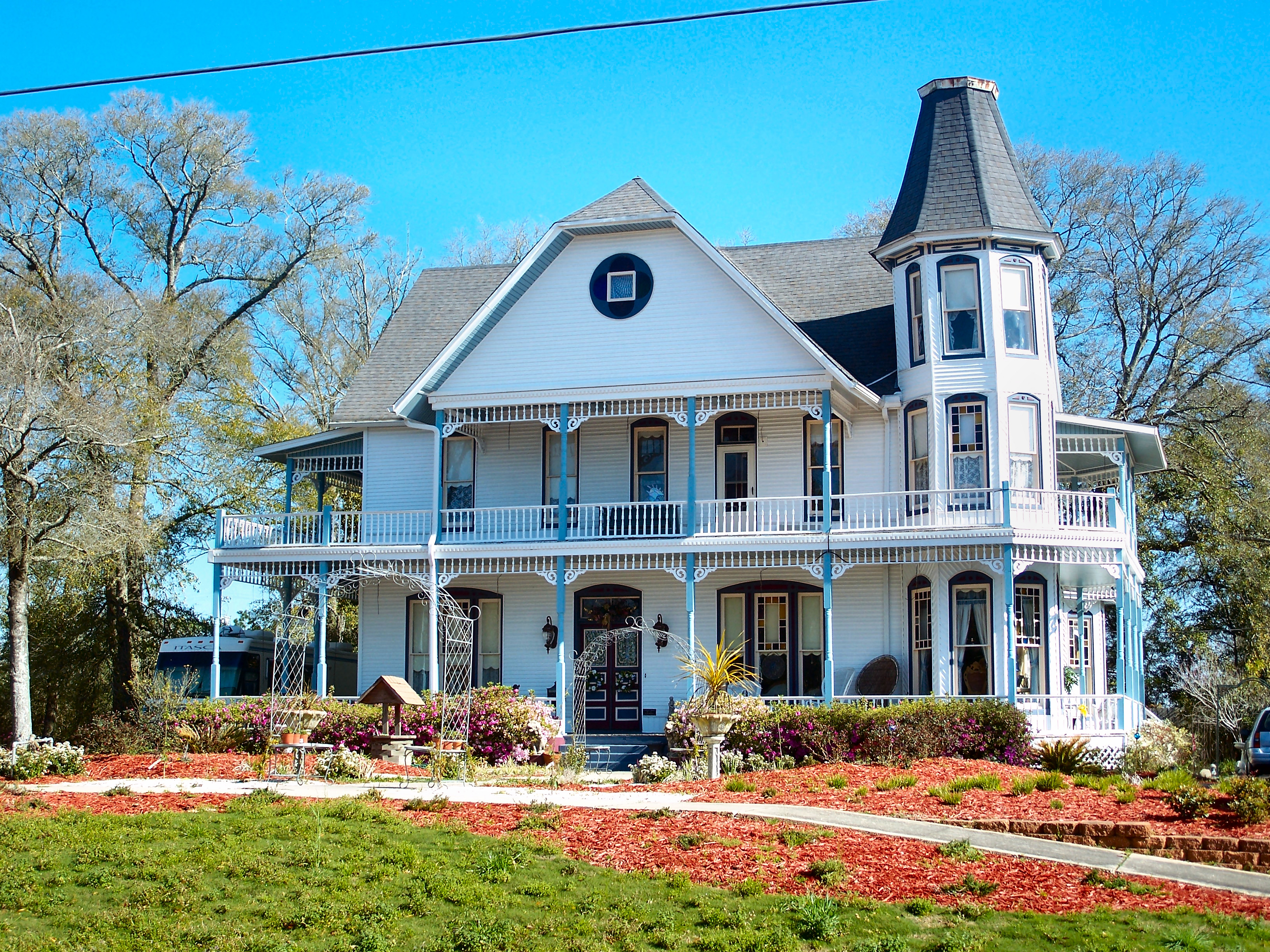

- Location within Florida Location within the United States
- Location: DeFuniak Springs, Florida
- Coordinates: 30°43′11″N 86°7′18″W
- Architectural style: Queen Anne
- NRHP reference No.: 79000693
- Added to NRHP: May 7, 1979

The Sun Bright (also known as the Sidney Johnston Catts House) is an historic residence in DeFuniak Springs, Walton County, Florida. Located at 30 Live Oak Ave W, it was the home of Sidney J. Catts, Florida's twenty-second governor. On May 7, 1979, it was added to the U.S. National Register of Historic Places.

In 1989, the house was listed in A Guide to Florida's Historic Architecture, published by the University of Florida Press.

After Governor Catts owned the house, it became a bed and breakfast until the early 2000 when it was converted back to a single family residence.
