= Walton County Heritage Museum =

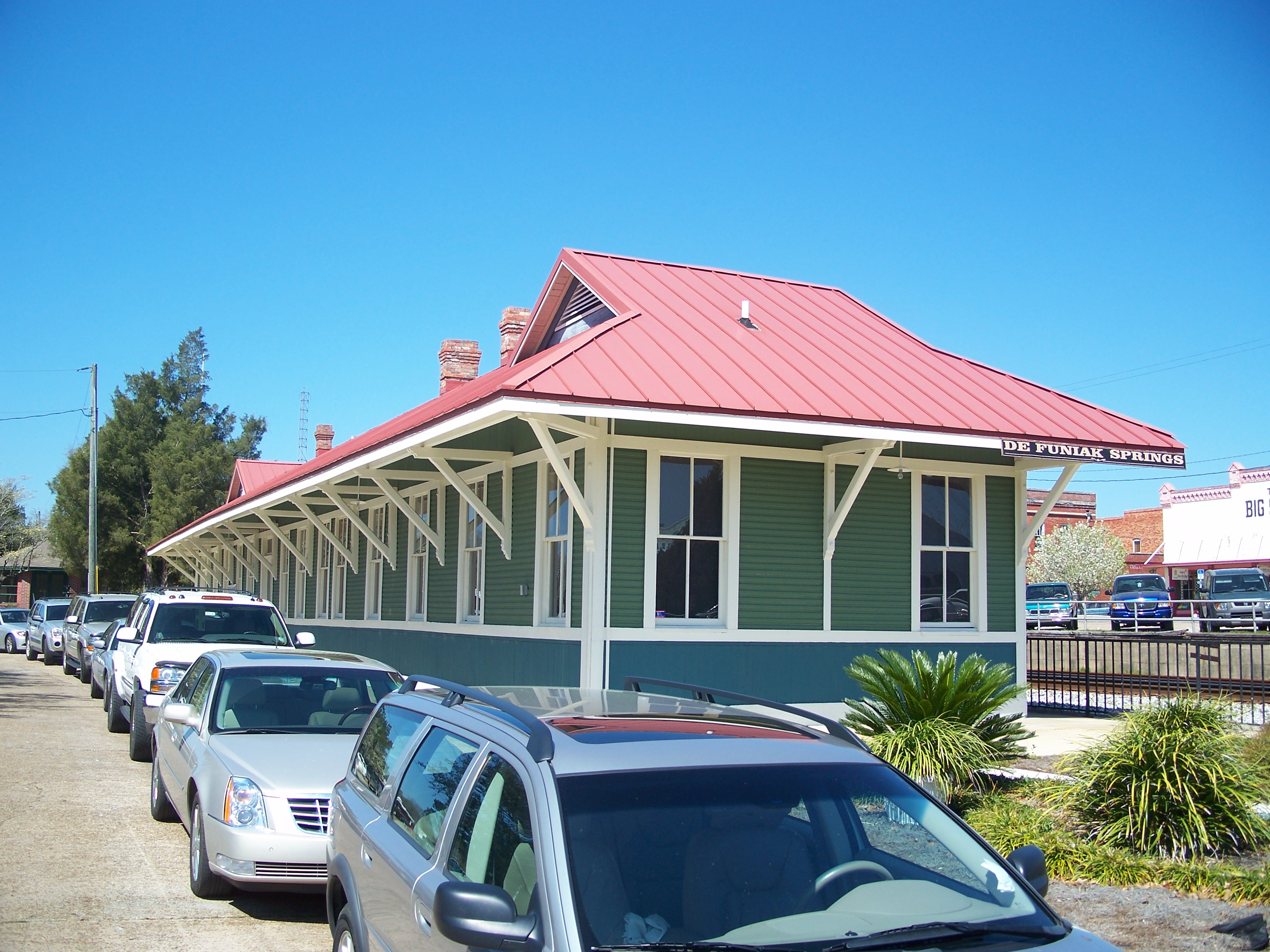

- Location within Florida
- Established: 2002
- Location: 1140 Circle Drive; DeFuniak Springs, Florida
- Coordinates: 30.71996°N 86.114595°W
- Type: History museum
- Website: Walton County Heritage Museum
- Walton County Heritage Museum
- U.S. Historic district – Contributing property
- Location: 1140 Circle Drive, DeFuniak Springs, Florida
- Part of: DeFuniak Springs Historic District (ID92001048)
- MPS: DeFuniak Springs MPS
- Added to NRHP: August 28, 1992

The Walton County Heritage Museum is located at 1140 Circle Drive, DeFuniak Springs, Florida. Housed in the former L&N railroad depot, it is part of the DeFuniak Springs Historic District, which is listed on the National Register of Historic Places.

== Footnotes ==
- Defuniak Springs, Florida (Images of America Series) by Diane Merkel (ISBN 9780738554075)

Preceding station	Louisville and Nashville Railroad	Following station
Mossy toward Myrtlewood	Myrtlewood – Chattahoochee	Ponce De Leon toward Chattahoochee
