= DeFuniak Springs, Florida =

- City
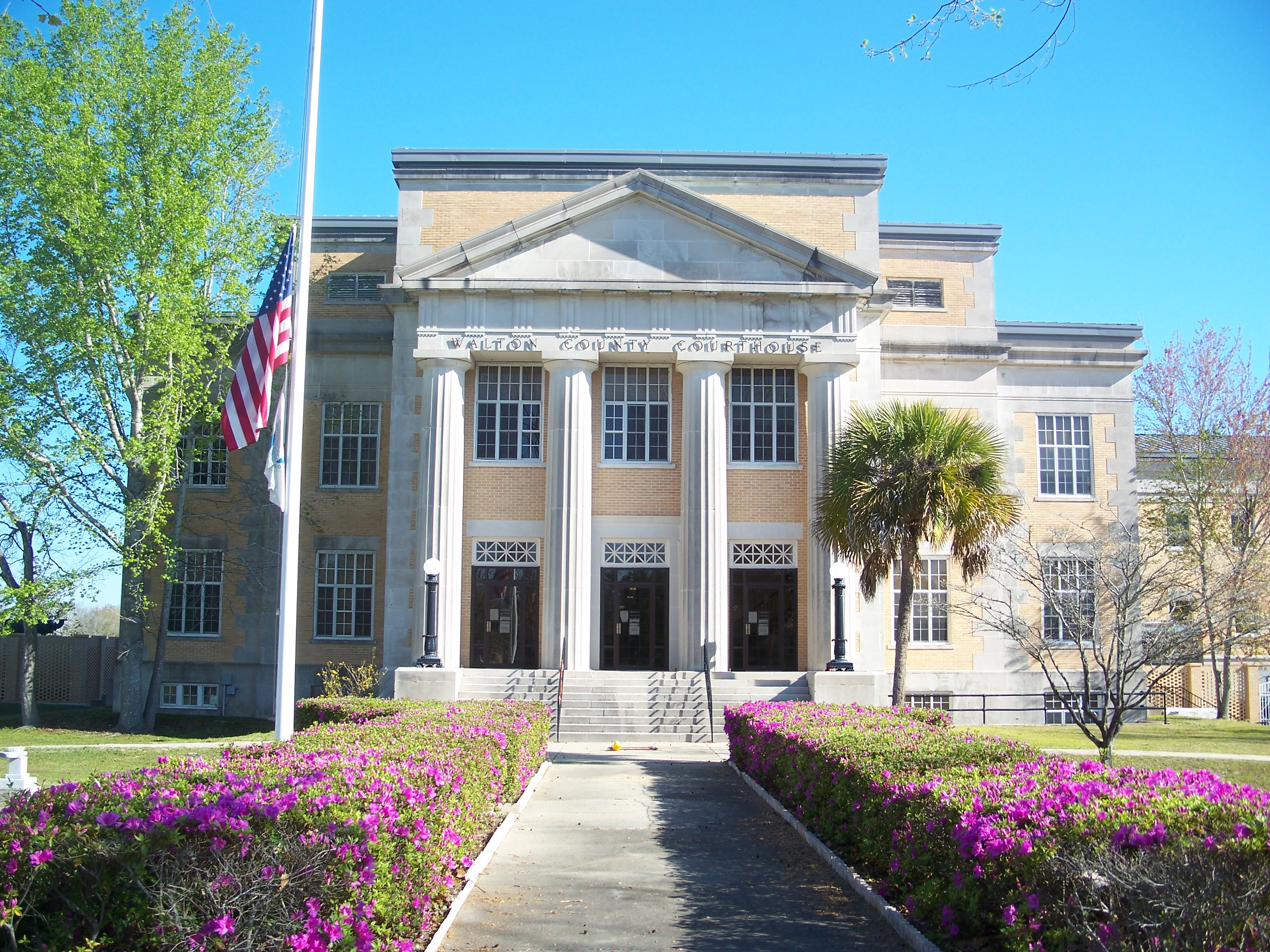
- Walton County Courthouse

- Seal
- Motto: "Partnership, Planning, And Preservation"
- Location in Walton County and the state of Florida
- Coordinates: 30°43′N 86°7′W
- Country: United States
- State: Florida
- County: Walton
- Incorporated: 1901

Government
  - Type: Council–Manager
  - Mayor: Bob Campbell
  - Mayor Pro Tem: Amy Heavilin
  - Council Members: Josh Sconiers, Todd Bierbaum, Danny Cosson, Glen Harrison
  - City Manager: Koby Townsend

Area
  - Total: 14.30 sq mi (37.03 km^{2})
  - Land: 13.95 sq mi (36.13 km^{2})
  - Water: 0.35 sq mi (0.90 km^{2})
- Elevation: 259 ft (79 m)

Population (2020)
  - Total: 5,919
  - Density: 424.3/sq mi (163.82/km^{2})
- Time zone: UTC-6 (Central (CST))
  - Summer (DST): UTC-5 (CDT)
- ZIP codes: 32433, 32435
- Area code: 850
- FIPS code: 12-16800
- GNIS feature ID: 0294592
- Website: www.defuniaksprings.net

DeFuniak Springs (/dəˈfjuːniːæk/ də-FEW-nee-ak) is a city in and the county seat of Walton County, Florida, United States. The population was 5,919 as of the 2020 Census, up from 5,177 at the 2010 census. It is part of the Crestview–Fort Walton Beach–Destin metropolitan area.

DeFuniak Springs is home to Lake DeFuniak, one of two spring-fed lakes in the world that is nearly perfectly round.

== History ==
=== Founding ===
The town was founded during the late 19th century as a resort development by the officers of the Pensacola and Atlantic Railroad, a subsidiary of the Louisville and Nashville Railroad. The P&A was organized to connect the terminus of the L&N at Pensacola to the western terminus of a predecessor of the Seaboard Air Line Railroad at River Junction—now Chattahoochee—in the 1880s. The town was named after Frederick R. DeFuniak, a vice-president of the L&N. Like much of Northwest Florida, DeFuniak Springs was settled mainly by Scots from Virginia and the Carolinas.

=== Chautauqua ===
DeFuniak Springs was established as a final-destination resort. The developers enlisted the cooperation and aid of the Chautauqua Movement. The Chautauqua Hall of Brotherhood, an auditorium seating 4,000, was constructed on Lake DeFuniak in the center of town. Seminars, classes, and the like were held in the Hall of Brotherhood building for people on vacation.

The auditorium of the building was severely damaged by Hurricane Eloise in 1975 and razed. In 2003, the Chautauqua Hall of Brotherhood Foundation, Inc., a charitable foundation, started a capital campaign to restore the historic building. The westerly portion of the building facing Circle Drive was still in use at that time.

=== Education ===
As part of the intellectual atmosphere of the town, a college and a private high school (named Palmer College and Palmer Academy, respectively), as well as a technical school (Thomas Industrial Institute) and a teacher training school (Florida Normal College) were established in the late 19th century. Florida Normal College was later incorporated into Florida State University. The other schools closed during the Great Depression, which created financial strains. There remains a College Avenue that once led to Palmer College.

In 1886, the town held an important meeting that changed the course of public education in Florida. At this meeting, teachers from around the state formed the Florida Education Association. This teachers' union remains the state's predominant voice for educators and is affiliated with the National Education Association and the American Federation of Teachers.

=== Farming ===
A chicken processing plant operated by Perdue Farms in DeFuniak Springs was closed in April 2004.

== Geography ==
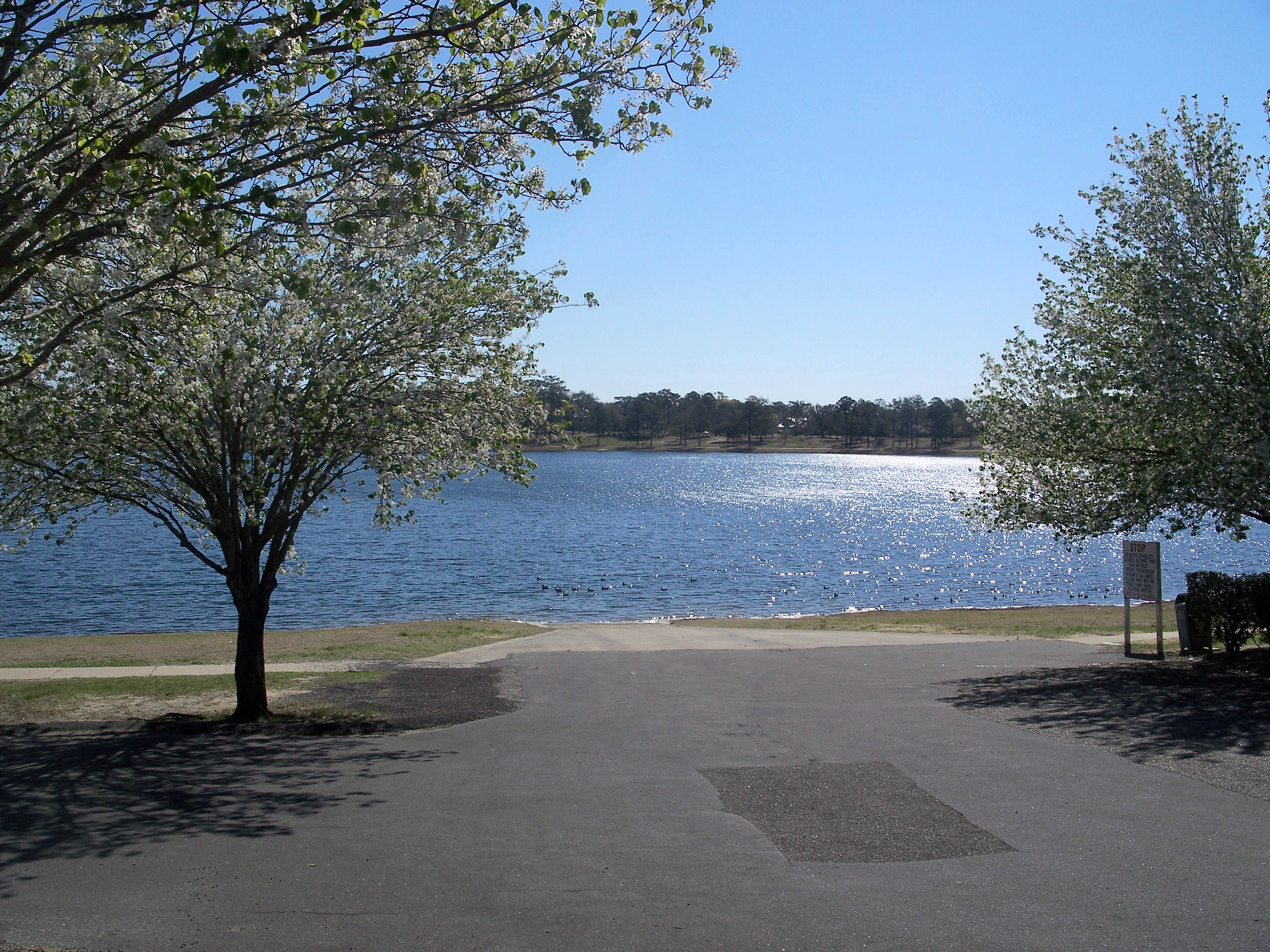
Lake DeFuniak

The city is located in the Florida Panhandle along Interstate 10 and U.S. Routes 90 and 331. I-10 runs south of the city from west to east, providing access from exit 85 (U.S. Route 331). I-10 leads east 119 mi (192 km) to Tallahassee, the state capital, and west 80 mi (130 km) to Pensacola. U.S. Route 90 runs through the city from west to east as Nelson Avenue, and leads east 12 mi (19 km) to Ponce de Leon and west 29 mi (47 km) to Crestview. U.S. Route 331 is the main north–south route in the city and its main connection to the Gulf coast. U.S. 331 leads northwest 25 mi (40 km) to Florala, Alabama, and south 26 mi (42 km) to U.S. Route 98 near Santa Rosa Beach. Florida State Road 83 also runs through the city as well, leading south to Santa Rosa Beach (with U.S. 331) and north 19 mi (31 km) to the Florida-Alabama state line.

According to the United States Census Bureau, the city has a total area of 11.2 square miles (29 km^{2}), of which 11.0 square miles (28 km^{2}) is land, and 0.3 square miles (0.78 km^{2}) (2.49%) is water.

=== Neighborhoods ===
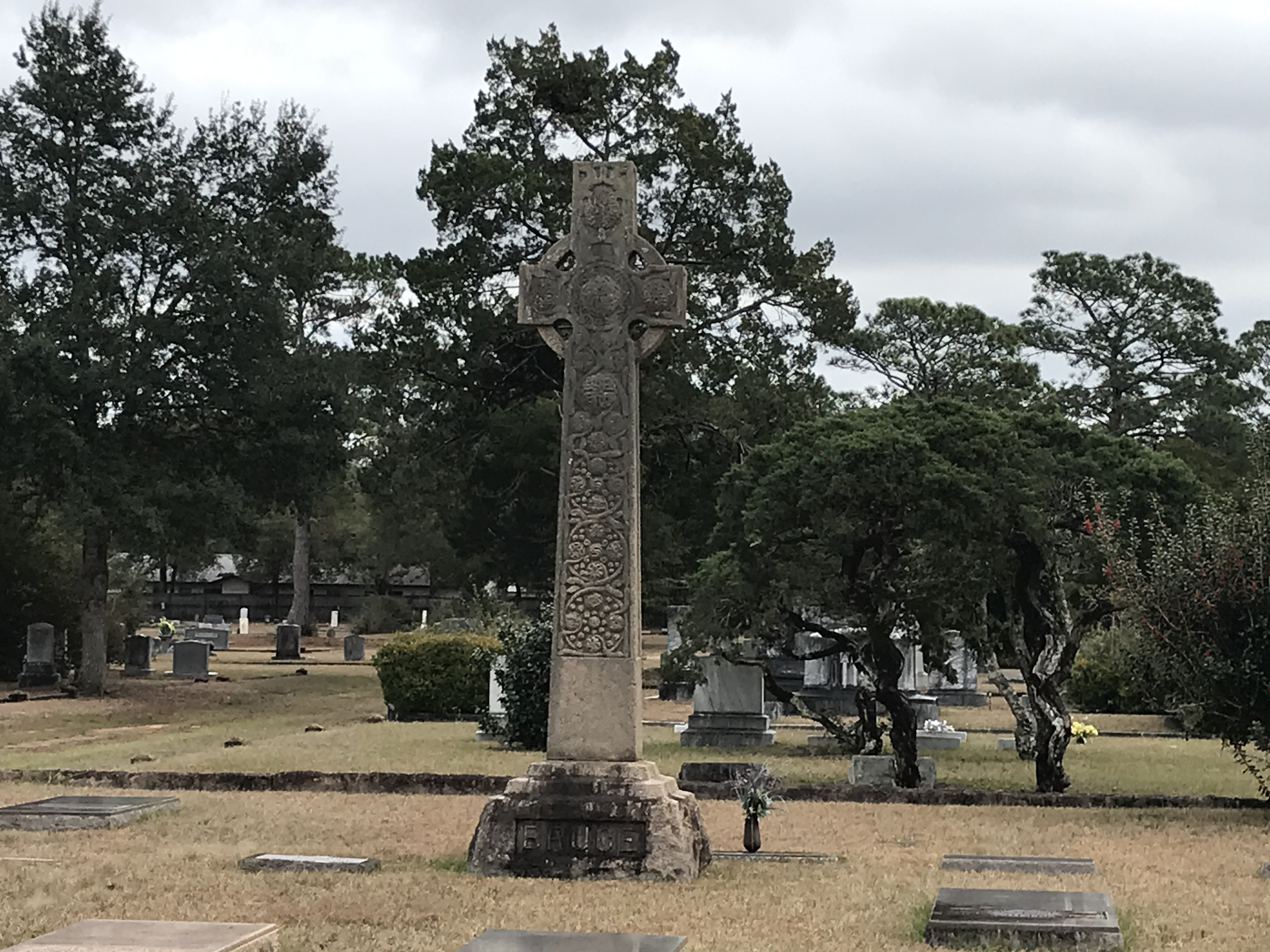
A Celtic Cross in Magnolia Cemetery

DeFuniak Springs, Florida has several neighborhoods, including the Historic District, Pine Shores, Oakdale and other unincorporated communities:

The Historic District is the center of the city, featuring the 260-acre Chipley Park and Lake DeFuniak, which is fed by natural springs. The area also includes the Historic Downtown District, which has shops, restaurants, and bakeries.

DeFuniak Springs is a family-friendly community with agricultural and educational history. The town features local lakes for kayaking, alongside an historic downtown atmosphere.

Magnolia Cemetery is located in the northeast section of DeFuniak Springs.

=== Climate ===
DeFuniak Springs has a humid subtropical climate (Cfa) with abundant precipitation, particularly during the summer months, due to its location on the Gulf Coast and consequent vulnerability to tropical storms and hurricanes.

Climate data for DeFuniak Springs 1 E, Florida, 1991–2020 normals, extremes 1896–2010
Month	Jan	Feb	Mar	Apr	May	Jun	Jul	Aug	Sep	Oct	Nov	Dec	Year
Record high °F (°C)	84 (29)	86 (30)	91 (33)	97 (36)	102 (39)	107 (42)	105 (41)	104 (40)	104 (40)	98 (37)	92 (33)	89 (32)	107 (42)
Mean daily maximum °F (°C)	62.3 (16.8)	65.8 (18.8)	72.7 (22.6)	79.2 (26.2)	86.4 (30.2)	90.3 (32.4)	92.3 (33.5)	91.4 (33.0)	88.3 (31.3)	80.5 (26.9)	71.3 (21.8)	64.3 (17.9)	78.7 (25.9)
Daily mean °F (°C)	50.9 (10.5)	54.6 (12.6)	60.4 (15.8)	66.6 (19.2)	74.8 (23.8)	80.3 (26.8)	82.4 (28.0)	81.5 (27.5)	77.8 (25.4)	68.9 (20.5)	58.9 (14.9)	53.1 (11.7)	67.5 (19.7)
Mean daily minimum °F (°C)	39.5 (4.2)	43.4 (6.3)	48.0 (8.9)	54.0 (12.2)	63.1 (17.3)	70.2 (21.2)	72.4 (22.4)	71.7 (22.1)	67.4 (19.7)	57.4 (14.1)	46.6 (8.1)	41.8 (5.4)	56.3 (13.5)
Record low °F (°C)	3 (−16)	0 (−18)	19 (−7)	21 (−6)	35 (2)	43 (6)	54 (12)	55 (13)	35 (2)	28 (−2)	16 (−9)	5 (−15)	0 (−18)
Average precipitation inches (mm)	5.04 (128)	5.07 (129)	5.18 (132)	4.30 (109)	3.99 (101)	7.10 (180)	7.50 (191)	6.95 (177)	6.04 (153)	3.58 (91)	4.43 (113)	5.45 (138)	64.63 (1,642)
Average precipitation days (≥ 0.01 in)	9.2	8.3	8.0	7.0	7.6	12.7	14.2	13.9	10.3	6.2	7.0	8.6	113.0
Source: NOAA

== Demographics ==
Historical population
Census	Pop.	Note	%±
1890	672		—
1910	2,017		—
1920	2,097		4.0%
1930	2,636		25.7%
1940	2,570		−2.5%
1950	3,077		19.7%
1960	5,282		71.7%
1970	4,966		−6.0%
1980	5,563		12.0%
1990	5,120		−8.0%
2000	5,089		−0.6%
2010	5,177		1.7%
2020	5,919		14.3%
U.S. Decennial Census

=== Racial and ethnic composition ===
DeFuniak Springs racial composition (Hispanics excluded from racial categories) (NH = Non-Hispanic)
Race	Pop 2010	Pop 2020	% 2010	% 2020
White (NH)	3,555	3,753	68.67%	63.41%
Black or African American (NH)	1,045	996	20.19%	16.83%
Native American or Alaska Native (NH)	34	26	0.66%	0.44%
Asian (NH)	33	54	0.64%	0.91%
Pacific Islander or Native Hawaiian (NH)	3	2	0.06%	0.03%
Some other race (NH)	7	40	0.14%	0.68%
Two or more races/Multiracial (NH)	113	393	2.18%	6.64%
Hispanic or Latino (any race)	387	655	7.48%	11.07%
Total	5,177	5,919		

=== 2020 census ===
As of the 2020 census, DeFuniak Springs had a population of 5,919. The median age was 38.1 years. 25.9% of residents were under the age of 18 and 20.1% of residents were 65 years of age or older. For every 100 females there were 89.8 males, and for every 100 females age 18 and over there were 85.8 males age 18 and over.

77.6% of residents lived in urban areas, while 22.4% lived in rural areas.

There were 2,328 households in DeFuniak Springs, of which 32.1% had children under the age of 18 living in them. Of all households, 34.0% were married-couple households, 21.1% were households with a male householder and no spouse or partner present, and 38.4% were households with a female householder and no spouse or partner present. About 32.4% of all households were made up of individuals and 15.4% had someone living alone who was 65 years of age or older.

There were 2,648 housing units, of which 12.1% were vacant. The homeowner vacancy rate was 2.3% and the rental vacancy rate was 5.7%.

According to the 2020 ACS 5-year estimates, there were 1,789 families residing in the city.

=== 2010 census ===
As of the 2010 United States census, there were 5,177 people, 2,306 households, and 1,287 families residing in the city.

=== 2000 census ===
As of the census of 2000, there were 5,089 people, 2,105 households, and 1,324 families residing in the city. The population density was 464.0 inhabitants per square mile (179.2/km^{2}). There were 2,464 housing units at an average density of 224.7 per square mile (86.8/km^{2}). The racial makeup of the city was 71.78% White, 22.99% African American, 1.00% Native American, 0.51% Asian, 0.08% Pacific Islander, 1.81% from other races, and 1.83% from two or more races. Hispanic or Latino of any race were 3.30% of the population.

In 2000, there were 2,105 households, out of which 27.4% had children under the age of 18 living with them, 40.7% were married couples living together, 18.4% had a female householder with no husband present, and 37.1% were non-families. 33.5% of all households were made up of individuals, and 16.2% had someone living alone who was 65 years of age or older. The average household size was 2.30, and the average family size was 2.91.

In 2000, in the city, the population was spread out, with 23.6% under the age of 18, 8.6% from 18 to 24, 24.4% from 25 to 44, 22.2% from 45 to 64, and 21.2% who were 65 years of age or older. The median age was 40 years. For every 100 females, there were 84.9 males. For every 100 females age 18 and over, there were 78.7 males.

In 2000, the median income for a household in the city was $24,516, and the median income for a family was $28,750. Males had a median income of $24,219 versus $19,255 for females. The per capita income for the city was $13,298. About 18.2% of families and 18.4% of the population were below the poverty line, including 27.6% of those under age 18 and 9.3% of those age 65 or over.

== Arts and culture ==
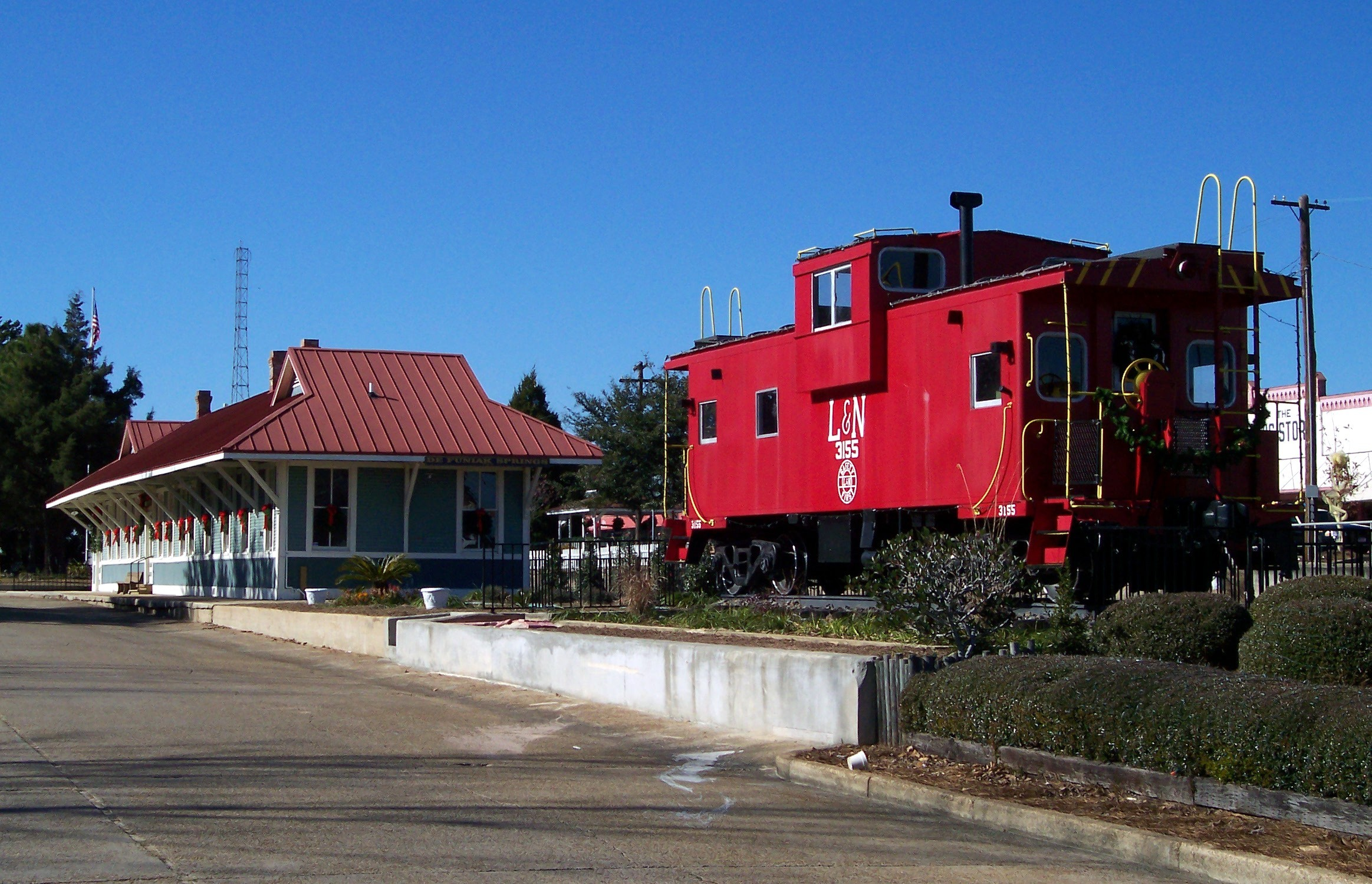
The former Louisville and Nashville Railroad depot, now the Walton County Heritage Museum

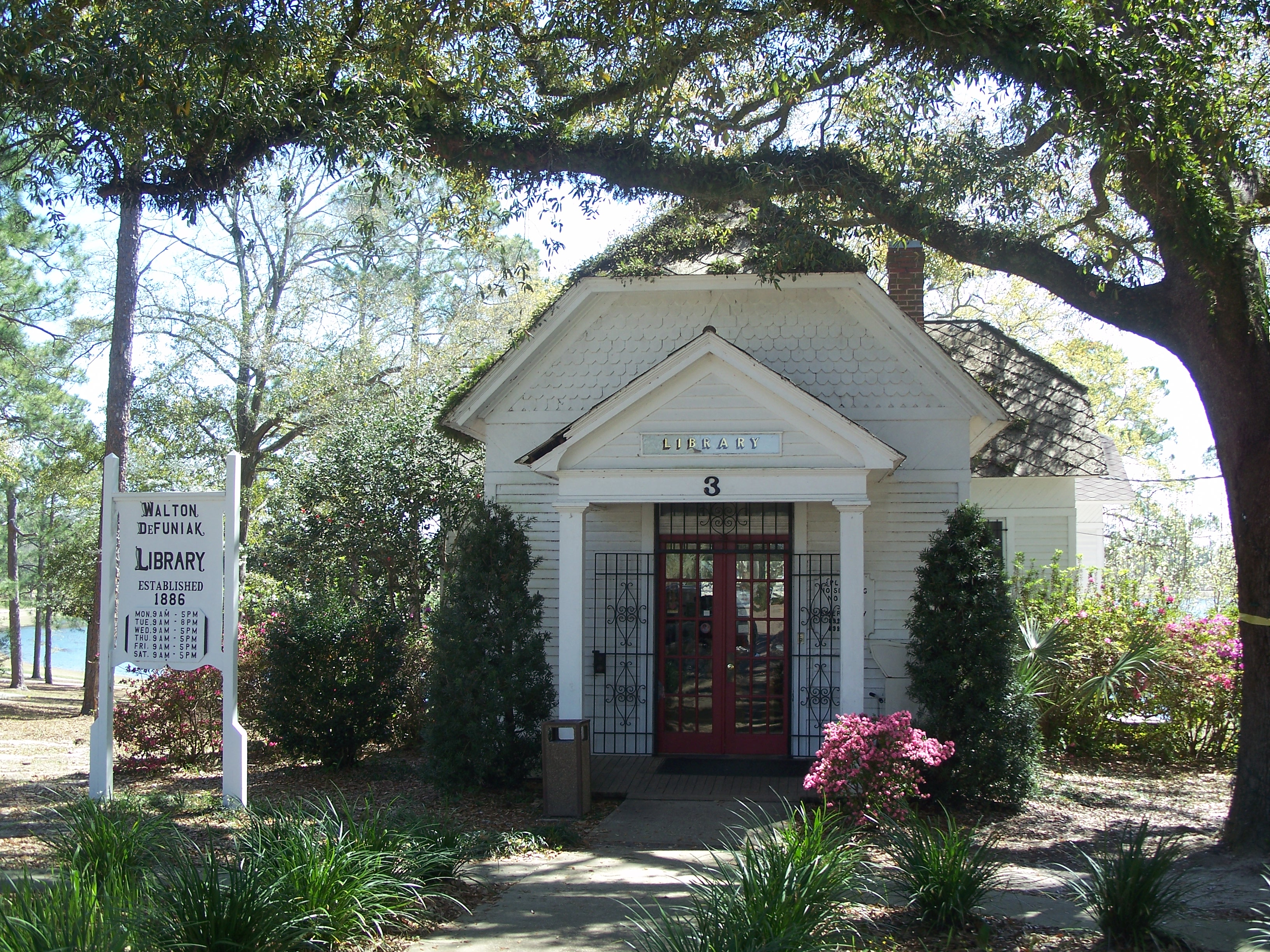
Walton-DeFuniak Library, the oldest extant library in Florida

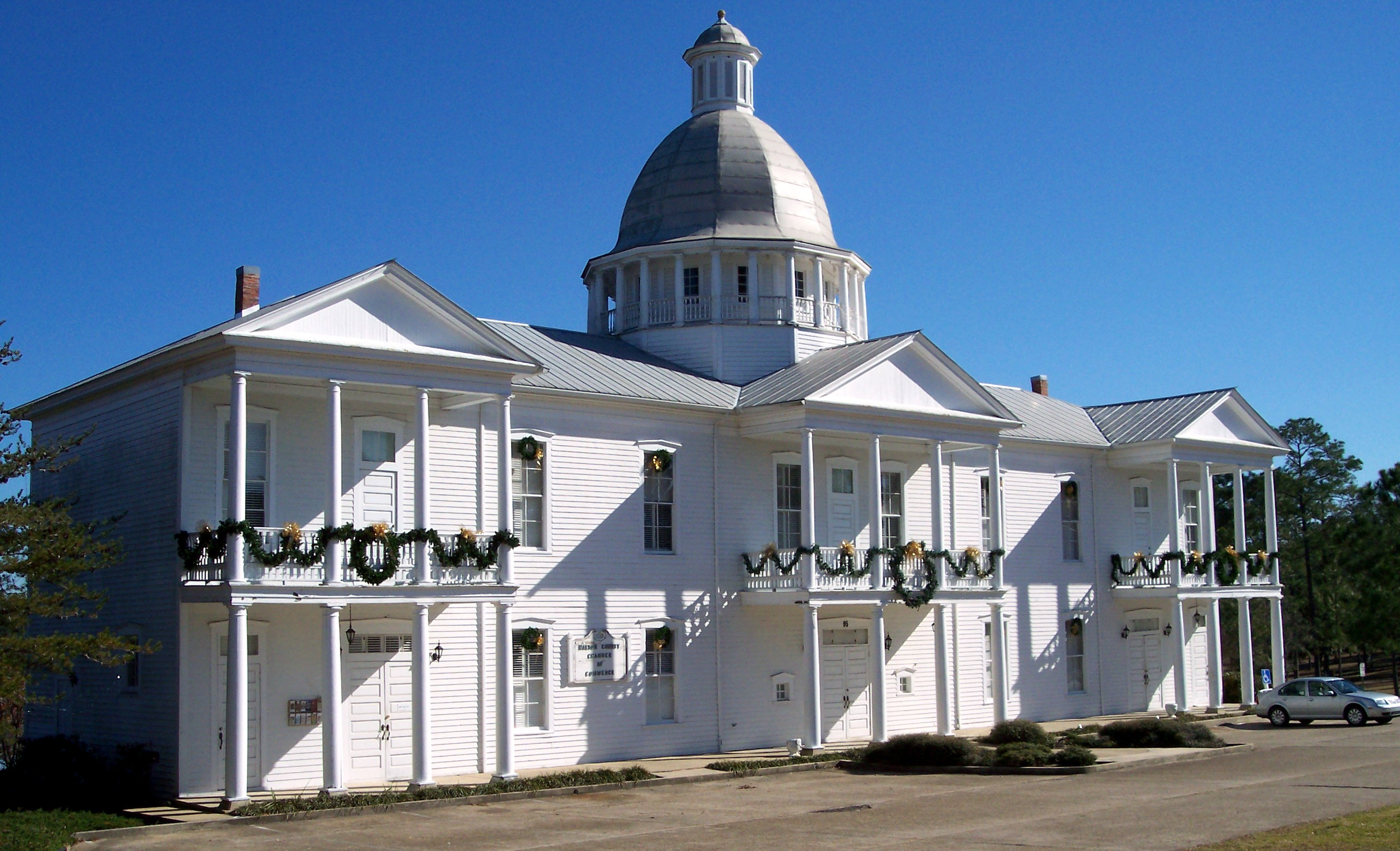
Chautauqua Hall of Brotherhood

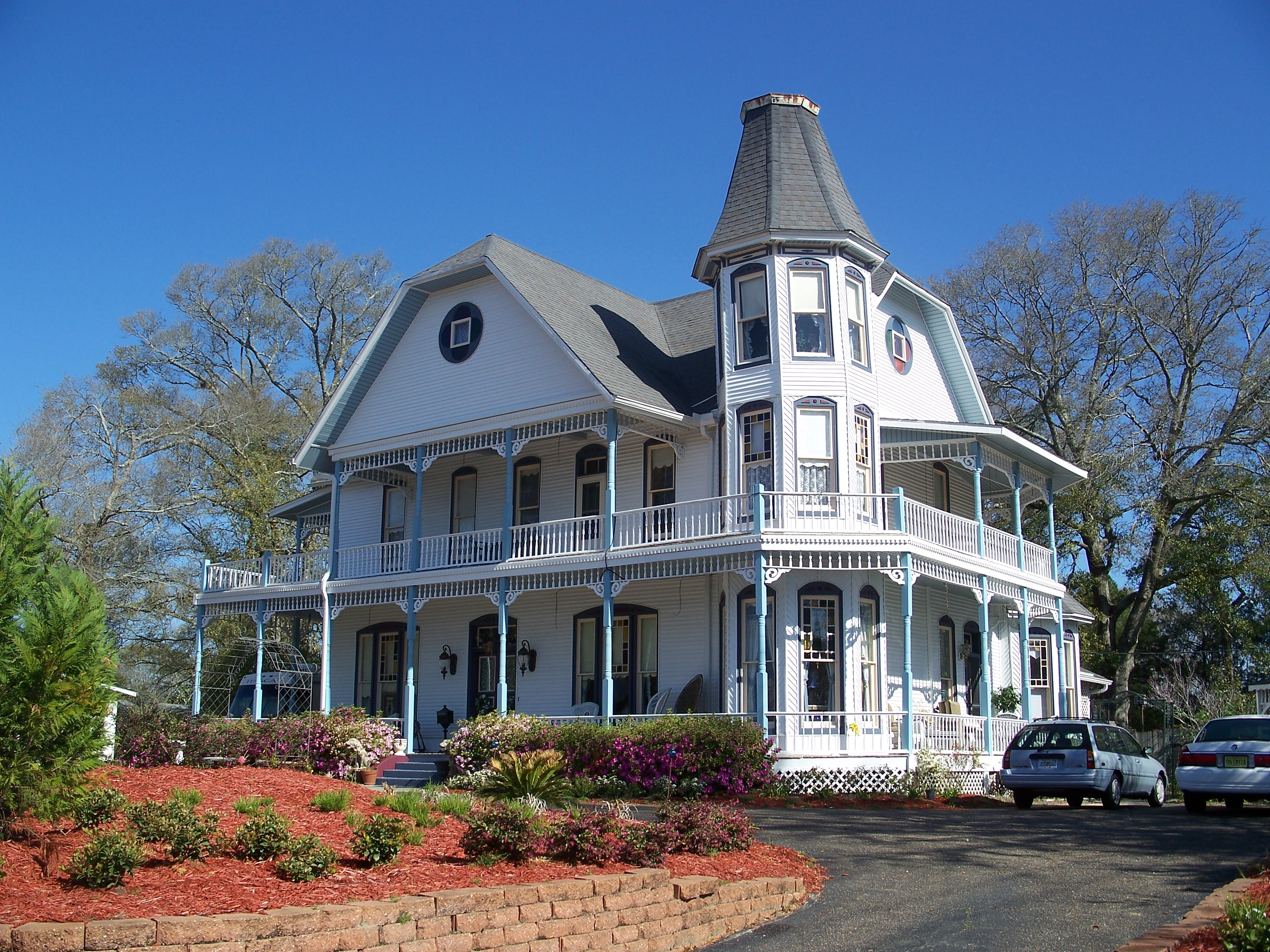
Sun Bright, home of Sidney Johnston Catts, Florida's 22nd governor

=== Traditions ===
The surrounding landscape of Lake DeFuniak is decorated for the holidays between Thanksgiving and New Year's Day; this is known to locals as the "Christmas Reflections".

=== Historic sites ===
Historic sites include:

- Walton-DeFuniak Library, the oldest extant library in Florida.
- Walton County Heritage Museum, housed in the former Louisville and Nashville Railroad depot.
- St. Agatha's Episcopal Church, built in 1895–1896.
- First Presbyterian Church.
- The first Confederate Monument in Florida, is located on the lawn of the Walton County Courthouse.

=== Library ===
At the time of planning, the founders of DeFuniak Springs were interested in the adult education movement. For DeFuniak Springs, this movement did not only include the Chautauqua center, McCormick University and Academy, and the State Normal School, but also a community library.

In 1887, a group of women formed the Ladies Library Association, and their goal was to establish a library that would become the "little sister" to the Chautauqua center, university, and school. The Ladies Library Association chose a plot of land adjacent to the Chautauqua center and signed a lease for ninety-nine years. By the end of 1887, five years after the initial plan of the village, there was a community library; the Ladies Library Association's main goal of establishing a social library was complete. Initially, the library relied on book donations, but also purchased books from the Ladies Reading Club and a private book owner, J. L. Shearer. The Ladies Library Association persisted and was able to maintain the library, books, and maintenance of the library for quite some time. However, by 1923, the Ladies Library Association was unable to continue to sustain the library and requested city funds, which the city took on gradually. It was not until the 1960s when the subscription fees were finally eliminated, and the county and city assumed total responsibility for its maintenance and collection development. Today, the Walton-DeFuniak Library contains antiquities, a medieval weapon collection, and many first-edition books.

== Education ==
=== Public schools ===
Public schools in Defuniak Springs are run by the Walton County School District.

- Walton High School
- Walton Middle School
- Maude Saunders Elementary School
- Mossy Head Elementary School
- West DeFuniak Elementary School
- Walton Academy

=== Private schools ===
- First Christian Academy

== Notable people ==
- Wankard Pooser, Florida politician
- Buck Showalter, MLB manager.
- Jerry Shriver, U.S. Army Special Forces
- Kyrsten Sinema, Arizona Senator
- Azareye'h Thomas, rising NFL player
- Juanyeh Thomas, NFL player

== See also ==
- Perry L. Biddle House
- DeFuniak Springs Historic District
