= Chautauqua Hall of Brotherhood =

- U.S. National Register of Historic Places
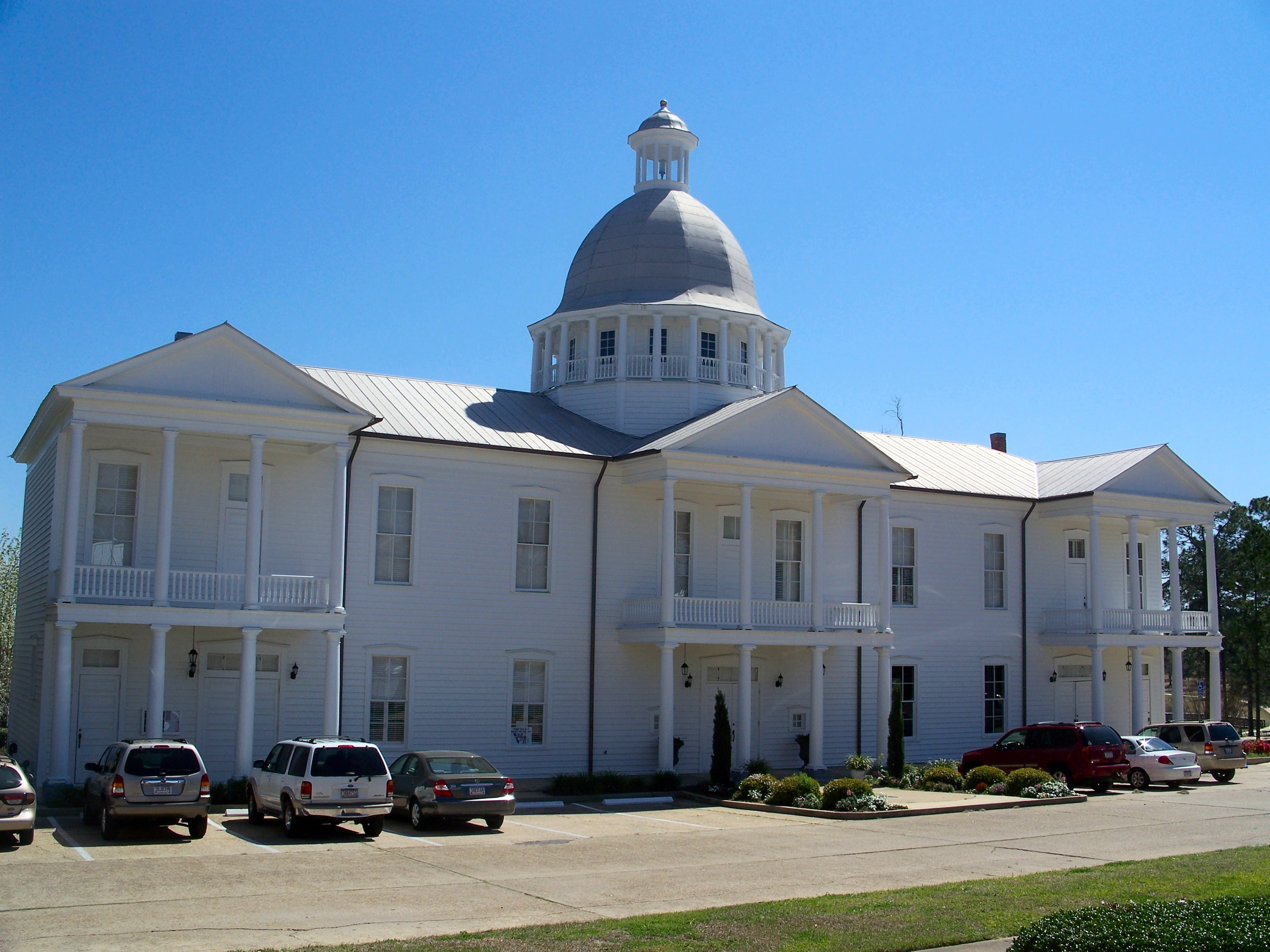
- Chautauqua Hall of Brotherhood, 2008

- Location within Florida Location within the United States
- Location: DeFuniak Springs, Florida
- Coordinates: 30°43′0″N 86°6′57″W
- Architectural style: Classical Revival
- NRHP reference No.: 72000358
- Added to NRHP: 7 August 1972

The Chautauqua Hall of Brotherhood (also known as the Chautauqua Auditorium and Lakeyard) is a historic site in DeFuniak Springs, Walton County, Florida. Built as part of the Chautauqua education movement, it is located at 95 Circle Drive and currently houses a branch of the Walton County Chamber of Commerce. On August 7, 1972, it was added to the U.S. National Register of Historic Places.

In 1989, the building was listed in A Guide to Florida's Historic Architecture, published by the University of Florida Press.
