= Frederick R. De Funiak =

Confederate States Army officer

- Born: August 5, 1839; Rome, Papal States
- Died: March 29, 1905 (aged 65); Louisville, Kentucky
- Occupation: Vice-President of Louisville & Nashville Railroad
- Known for: namesake of DeFuniak Springs, Florida

Frederick Rudolph De Funiak (August 5, 1839 – March 29, 1905) was an officer in the Confederate States Army during the American Civil War. Later he became a successful railroad engineer and an official of the Louisville and Nashville Railroad. DeFuniak Springs, Florida, is named for him.

== Biography ==
De Funiak was born in Rome, Papal States, on August 5, 1839, and came to America in 1862. He enlisted in the Confederate Army as captain in the engineering department and later was promoted to lieutenant-colonel. After the war ended in 1865 he became resident engineer for the Memphis and Charleston Railroad, and in 1869 was appointed chief engineer of the Ripley Railroad. In 1870, the Memphis & Charleston, the Mississippi Central Railroad, and the East Tennessee, Virginia and Georgia Railway roads sent Colonel De Funiak abroad to study European railroad construction methods, and when he returned a year later, he accepted the position of superintendent of machinery with the Louisville & Nashville. Later he was, for a number of years, general manager of that railroad. He retired in 1884. De Funiak died at his residence in Louisville, Kentucky, on March 29, 1905, at age 65.
