= Lake DeFuniak =

Lake in the state of Florida, United States

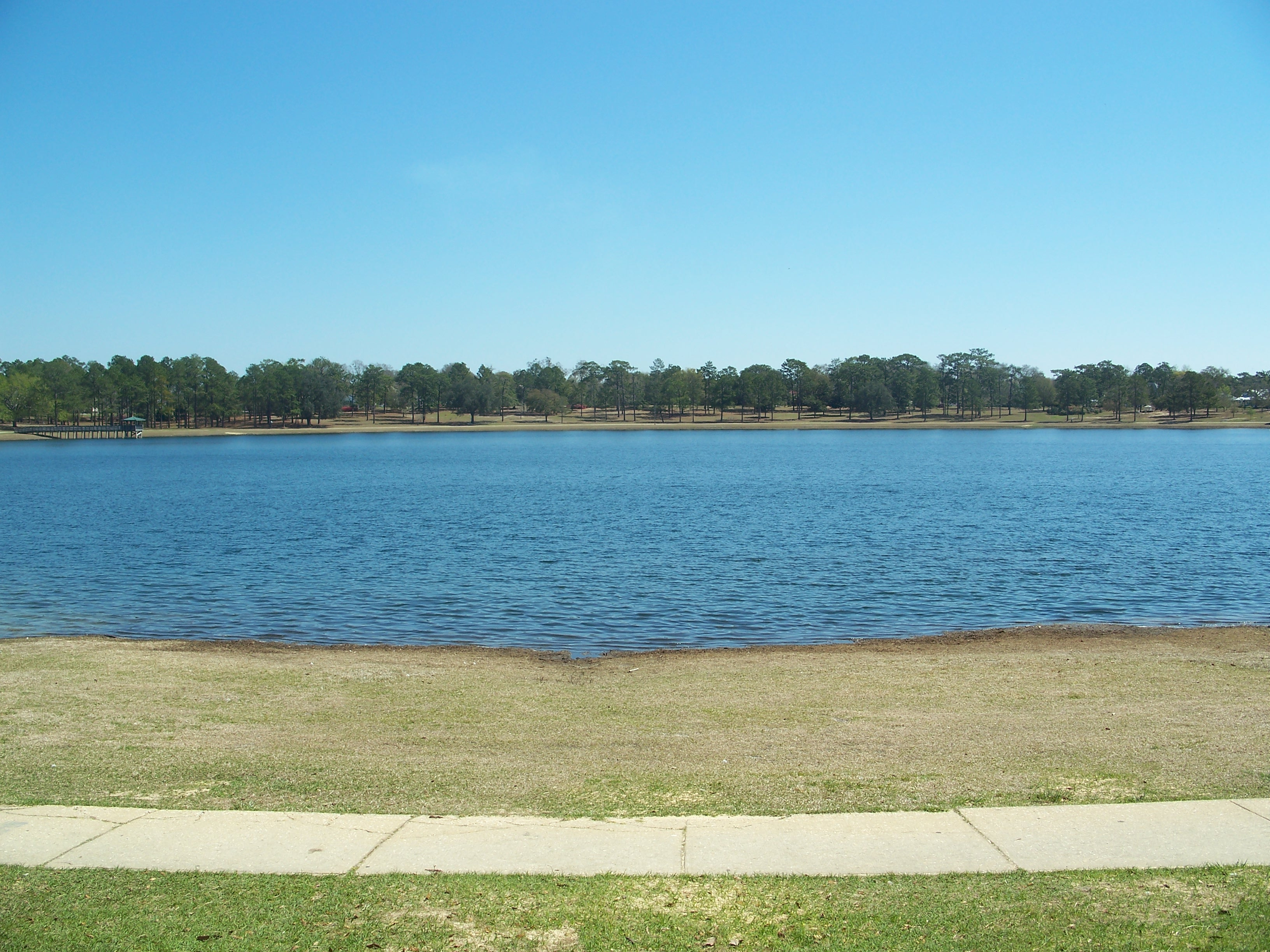

- Location within Florida Location within the United States
- Location: DeFuniak Springs, Florida
- Coordinates: 30°43′0.68″N 86°6′45.78″W
- Type: Natural freshwater lake
- Basin countries: United States
- Max. length: 1,580 ft (480 m)
- Max. width: 1,510 ft (460 m)
- Surface area: 38.64 acres (15.64 ha)
- Average depth: 6 ft (1.8 m)
- Max. depth: 74 ft (23 m)
- Surface elevation: 226 ft (69 m)

Lake DeFuniak is an almost perfectly circular 40 acre lake in DeFuniak Springs, Florida, United States, at the center of the DeFuniak Springs Historic District.

Lake DeFuniak is one of Florida's two almost perfectly round circular spring-fed lakes in the world, the other being Kingsley Lake.
