= National Register of Historic Places listings in Suwannee County, Florida =

Location of Suwannee County in Florida

This is a list of the National Register of Historic Places listings in Suwannee County, Florida.

This is intended to be a complete list of the properties on the National Register of Historic Places in Suwannee County, Florida, United States. The locations of National Register properties for which the latitude and longitude coordinates are included below, may be seen in a map.

There are 7 properties listed on the National Register in the county.

This National Park Service list is complete through NPS recent listings posted July 18, 2025.

Contents: Counties in Florida (non-linked contain no National Register listings)
Alachua - Baker - Bay - Bradford - Brevard - Broward - Calhoun - Charlotte - Citrus - Clay - Collier - Columbia - DeSoto - Dixie - Duval - Escambia - Flagler - Franklin - Gadsden - Gilchrist - Glades - Gulf - Hamilton - Hardee - Hendry - Hernando - Highlands - Hillsborough (Tampa) - Holmes - Indian River - Jackson - Jefferson - Lafayette - Lake - Lee - Leon - Levy - Liberty - Madison - Manatee - Marion - Martin - Miami-Dade (Miami) - Monroe - Nassau - Okaloosa - Okeechobee - Orange - Osceola - Palm Beach - Pasco - Pinellas - Polk - Putnam - St. Johns - St. Lucie - Santa Rosa - Sarasota - Seminole - Sumter - Suwannee - Taylor - Union - Volusia - Wakulla - Walton - Washington

== Current listings ==
	Name on the Register	Image	Date listed	Location	City or town	Description
1	George Allison House	George Allison House	April 20, 1995 (#95000369)	418 West Duval Street; 30°18′01″N 82°59′19″W	Live Oak	
2	Bishop B. Blackwell House	Bishop B. Blackwell House	February 28, 1985 (#85000360)	110 Parshley Street; 30°17′38″N 82°59′11″W	Live Oak	
3	Hull-Hawkins House	Hull-Hawkins House	May 7, 1973 (#73000604)	10 miles south of Live Oak on State Road 49; 30°11′07″N 82°54′13″W	Live Oak	
4	Old Live Oak City Hall	Old Live Oak City Hall	April 24, 1986 (#86000862)	212 North Ohio Avenue; 30°17′50″N 82°59′00″W	Live Oak	
5	Dr. Price House	Dr. Price House	September 25, 1998 (#98001200)	702 Pine Avenue; 30°17′28″N 82°58′43″W	Live Oak	
6	Suwannee County Courthouse	Suwannee County Courthouse	November 12, 1998 (#98001349)	200 South Ohio Avenue; 30°17′44″N 82°59′05″W	Live Oak	
7	Union Depot and Atlantic Coast Line Freight Station	Union Depot and Atlantic Coast Line Freight Station	April 24, 1986 (#86000860)	200 block of North Ohio Avenue; 30°17′49″N 82°59′01″W	Live Oak	

== See also ==
- List of National Historic Landmarks in Florida
- National Register of Historic Places listings in Florida
