= Dr. Price House =

Historic house in Florida, United States

- U.S. National Register of Historic Places
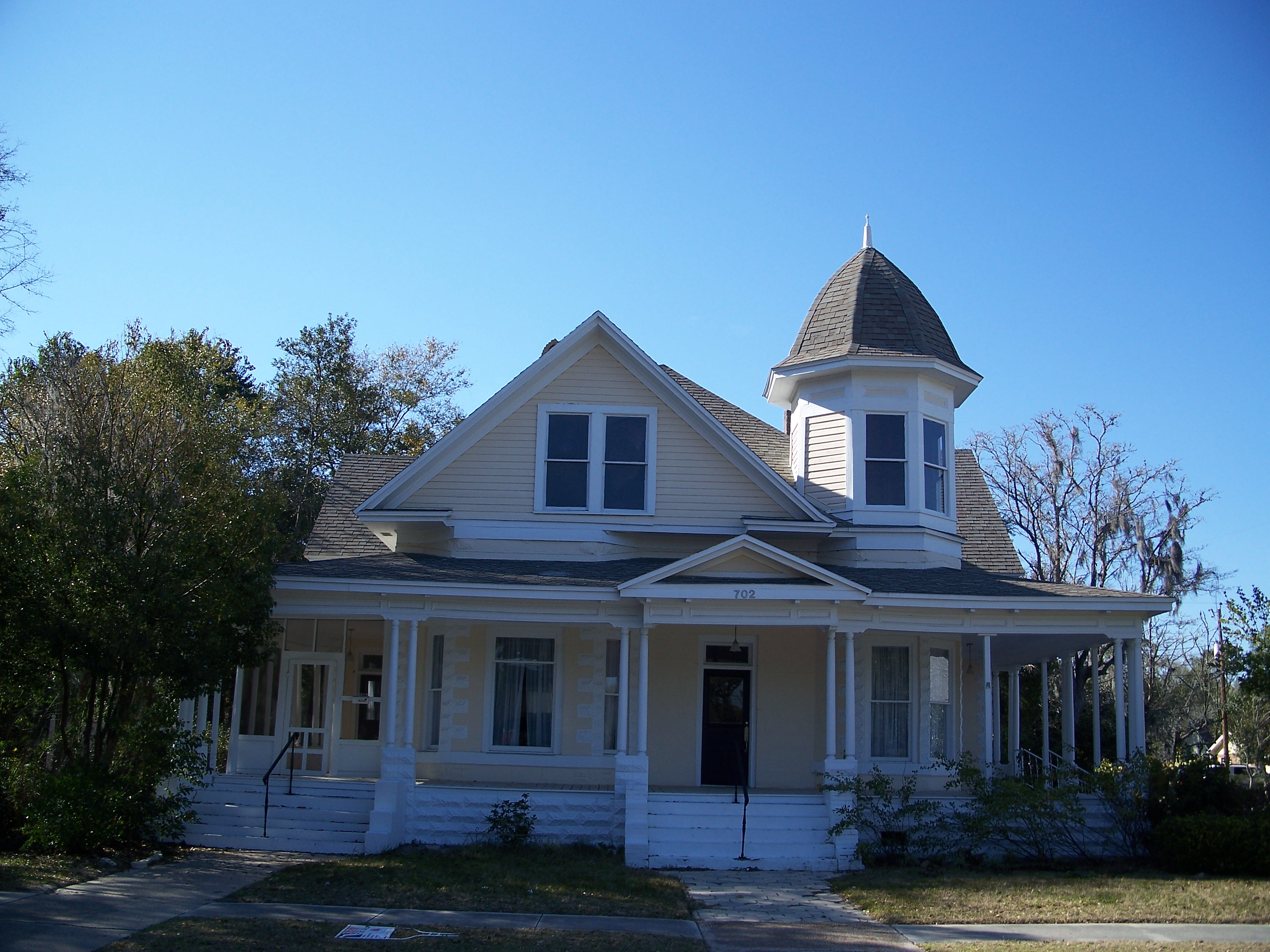

- Location within Florida Location within the United States
- Location: Live Oak, Florida
- Coordinates: 30°17′28″N 82°58′43″W
- Architectural style: Queen Anne
- NRHP reference No.: 98001200
- Added to NRHP: September 25, 1998

The Dr. Price House is a historic site in Live Oak, Florida, United States. It is located at 702 Pine Avenue. On September 25, 1998, it was added to the U.S. National Register of Historic Places.

== Gallery ==
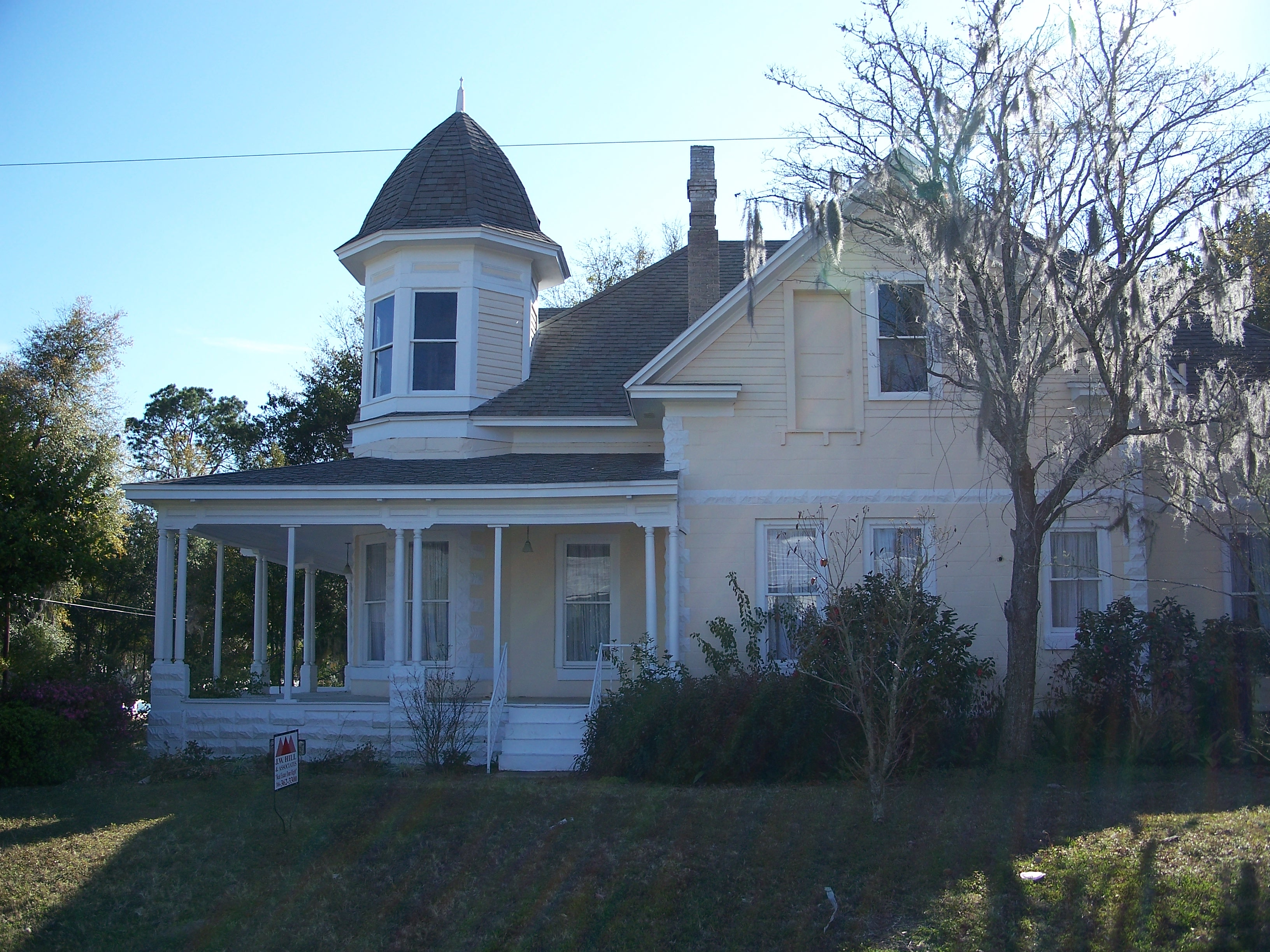
