= Suwannee High School =

Public high school in Live Oak, Florida, United States

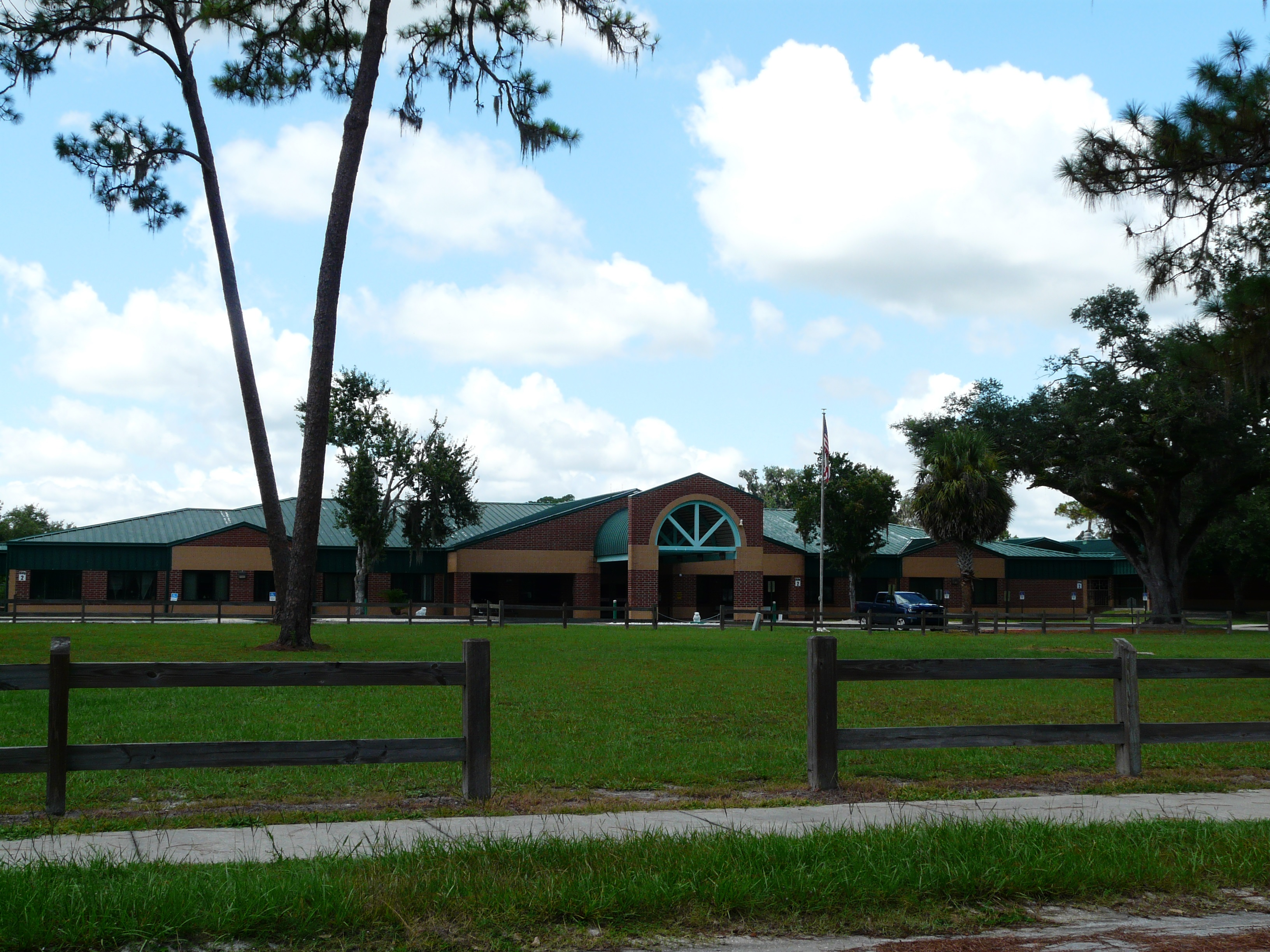

Location
- 1314 Pine Avenue; Live Oak, Florida 32064; United States; 30°17′03″N 82°59′25″W

Information
- Type: Public High School
- Established: 1897
- School district: Suwannee County School District
- Principal: Laura Williams
- Faculty: 67
- Teaching staff: 52.10 (FTE)
- Grades: 9–12
- Enrollment: 1,202 (2023–2024)
- Student to teacher ratio: 23.07
- Campus type: Rural
- Colors: Green and White
- Nickname: Bulldogs
- Yearbook: Suwannean
- Website: shs.suwannee.k12.fl.us

Suwannee High School is a public high school in Live Oak, Florida. It serves grades 9–12 and is part of the Suwannee County School District.

== Sports ==
There are 26 athletic teams, known as the Bulldogs, in 14 sports: baseball, basketball (boys' and girls'), bowling, cheerleading, cross country, football, golf (boys' and girls'), soccer (boys' and girls'), softball, swimming, tennis, track (boys' and girls'), volleyball, and wrestling.

The varsity football team won four consecutive 3A FHSAA championships from 1987 to 1991.

The Suwannee High wrestling team has won three state championships.

== Notable people ==
- Andra Davis, NFL linebacker
- Sheck Exley, cave diver, was a mathematics teacher at the school.
- Trysten Hill, NFL defensive tackle
- Kelly Jennings, NFL cornerback
- Bruce Johnson, NFL cornerback
- Dale McCullers, NFL linebacker
- Jimmy Nelson, NFL running back
- Titus O'Neil, professional wrestler currently signed with WWE and former Arena Football player
- Del Williams, NFL offensive lineman
