= Suwannee River State Park =

State park in Florida, United States

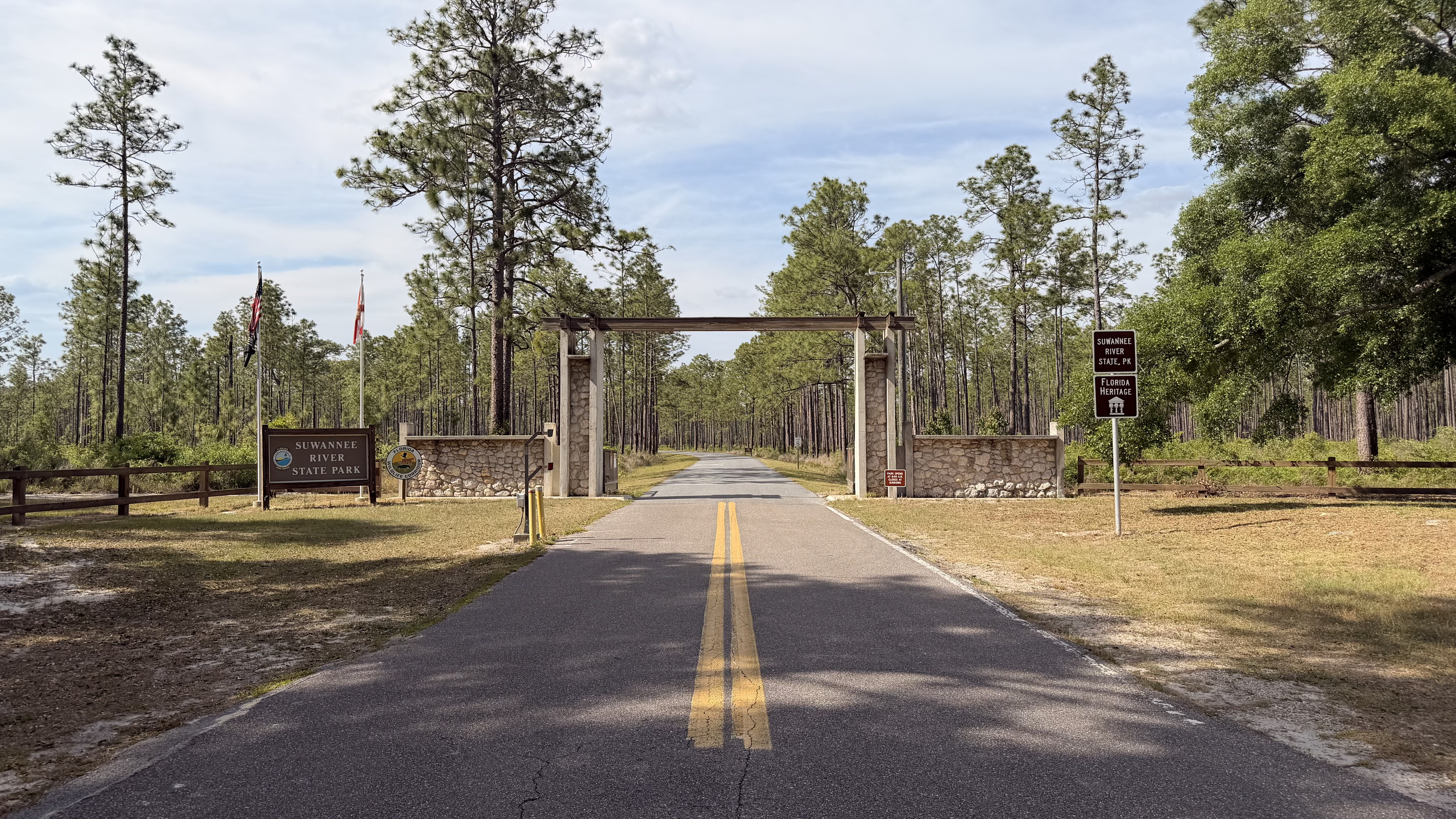
- A view of the front gate

- Location within Florida Location within the United States
- Interactive map of Suwannee River State Park
- Location: Suwannee County, Florida, United States
- Nearest city: Live Oak, Florida
- Coordinates: 30°22′44″N 83°09′57″W
- Governing body: Florida Department of Environmental Protection

Suwannee River State Park is a Florida State Park located near Live Oak. It offers some of the best backcountry canoeing opportunities in the state. Visitors can see cypress trees, southern magnolia, herons, American coots, turtles and hawks. The park is open year-round.

== Recreational Activities ==
Park amenities include birding, boating, cabins, canoeing, fishing, hiking, kayaking, picnicking areas, wildlife viewing and full camping facilities. Snorkeling, swimming, and scuba diving are not permitted, but are available at nearby Falmouth and Ellaville springs.

== See also ==
- Suwannee Springs
- Lower Suwannee National Wildlife Refuge
- Twin Rivers State Forest

== Gallery ==
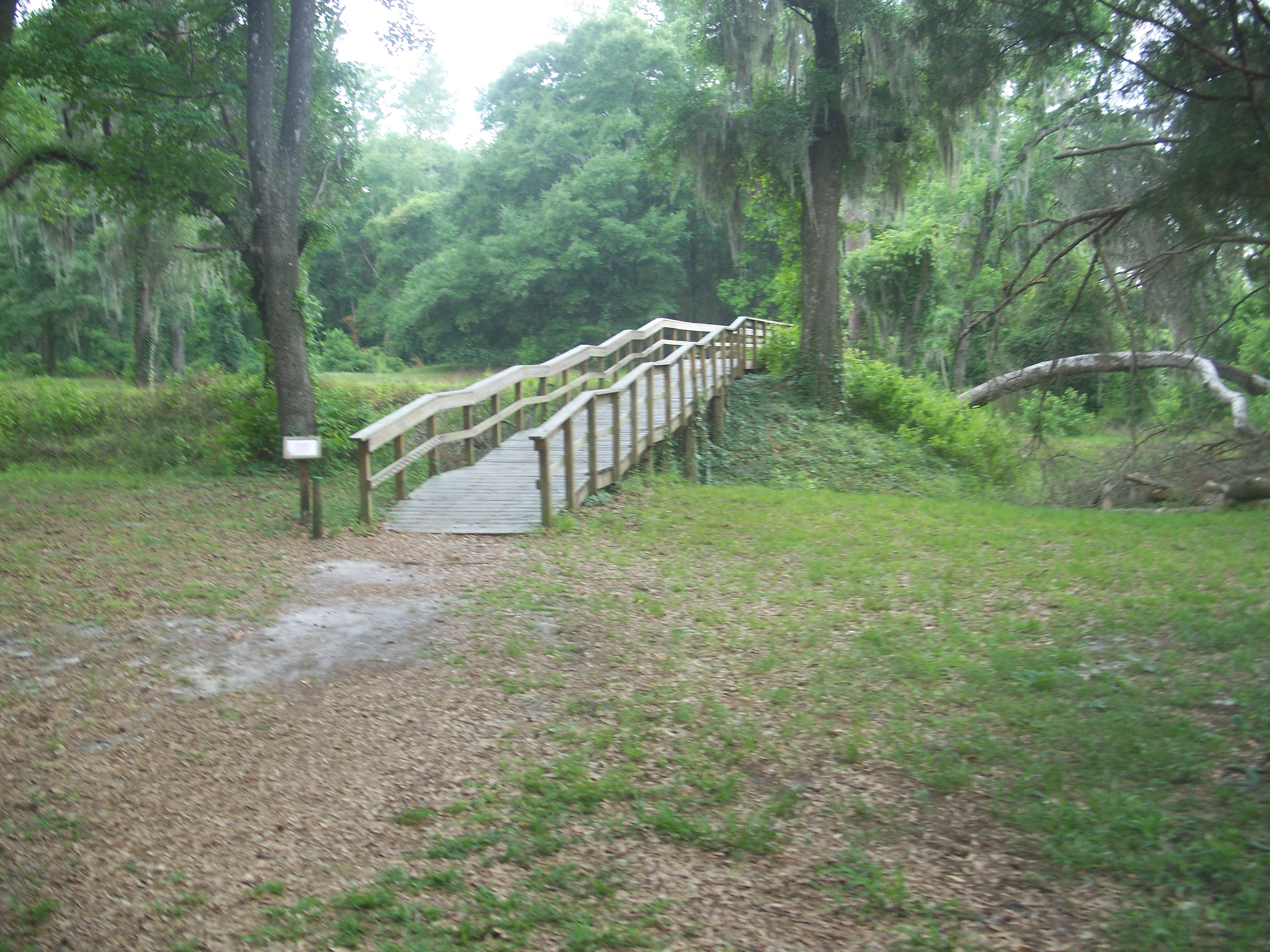
Boardwalk leading to Confederate earthworks

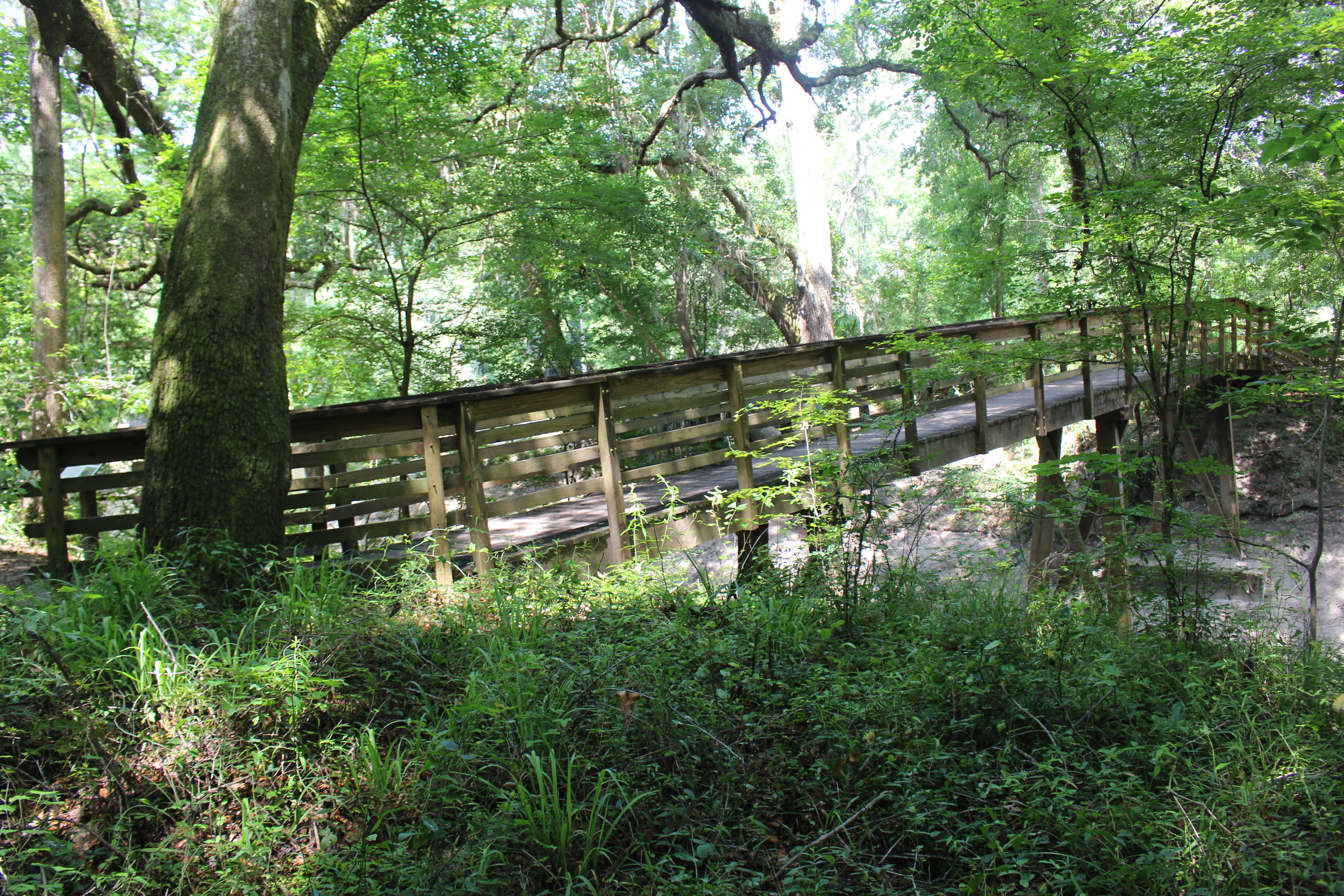
Footbridge over Lime Sink Run

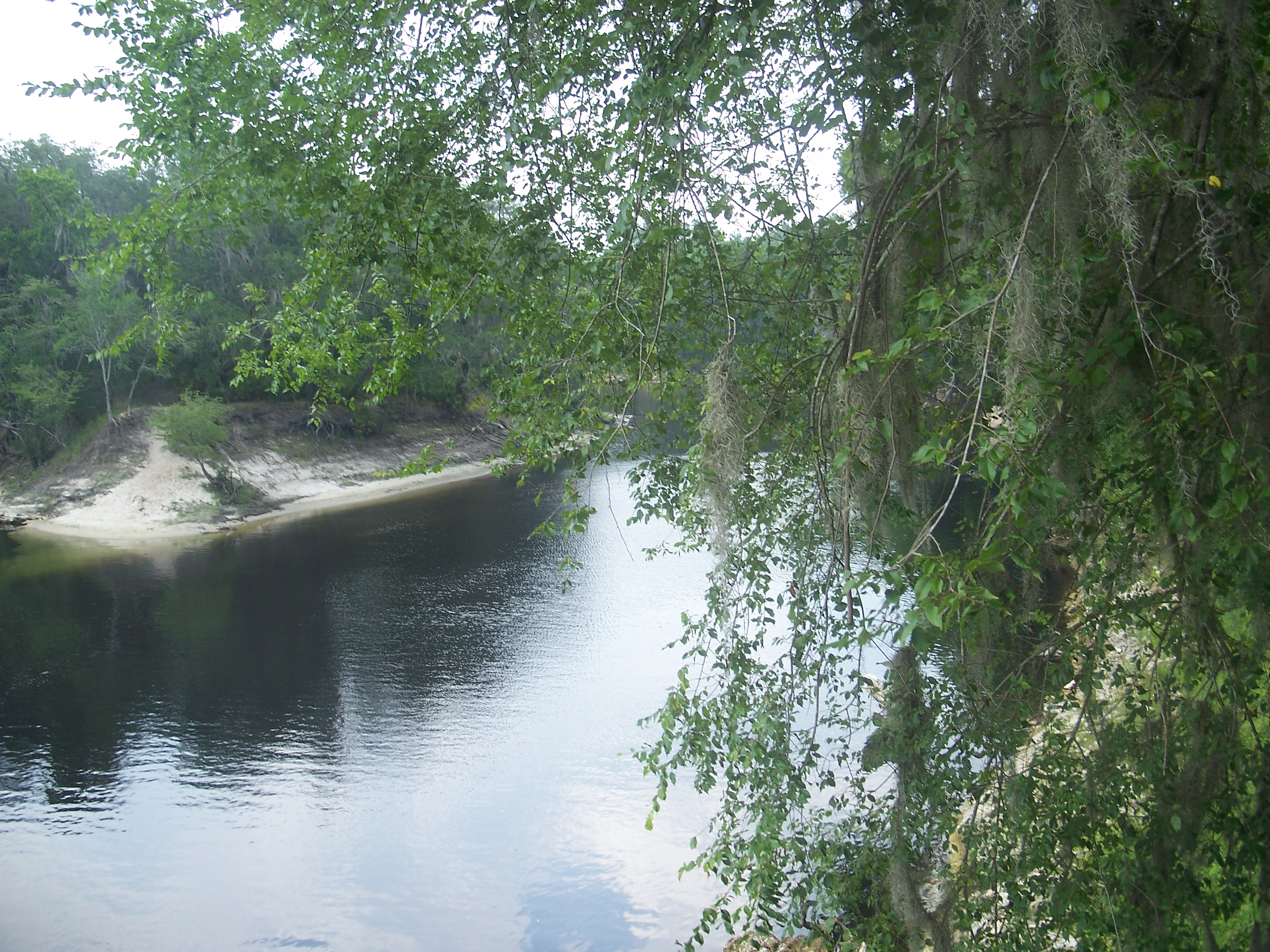
River

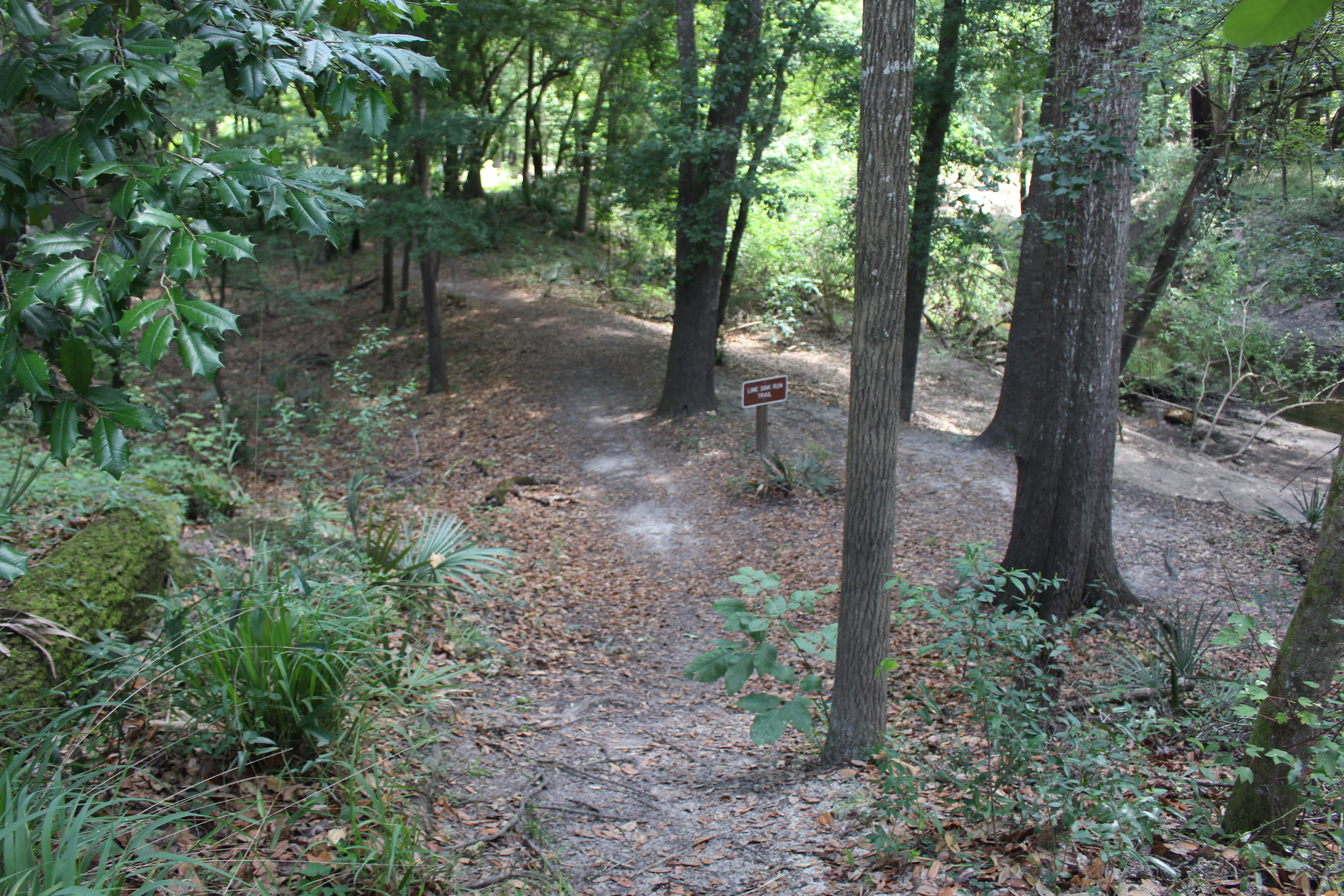
Trails

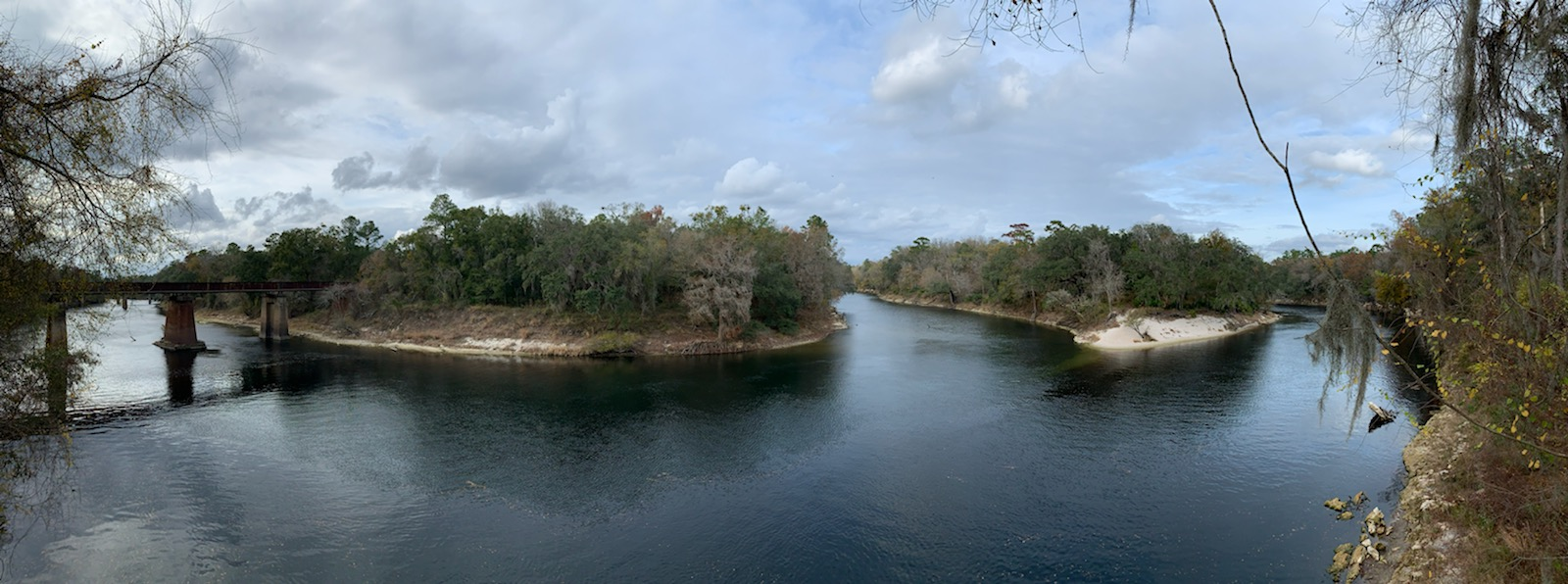
Confluence of the Withlacoochee (center) and the Suwannee (foreground)

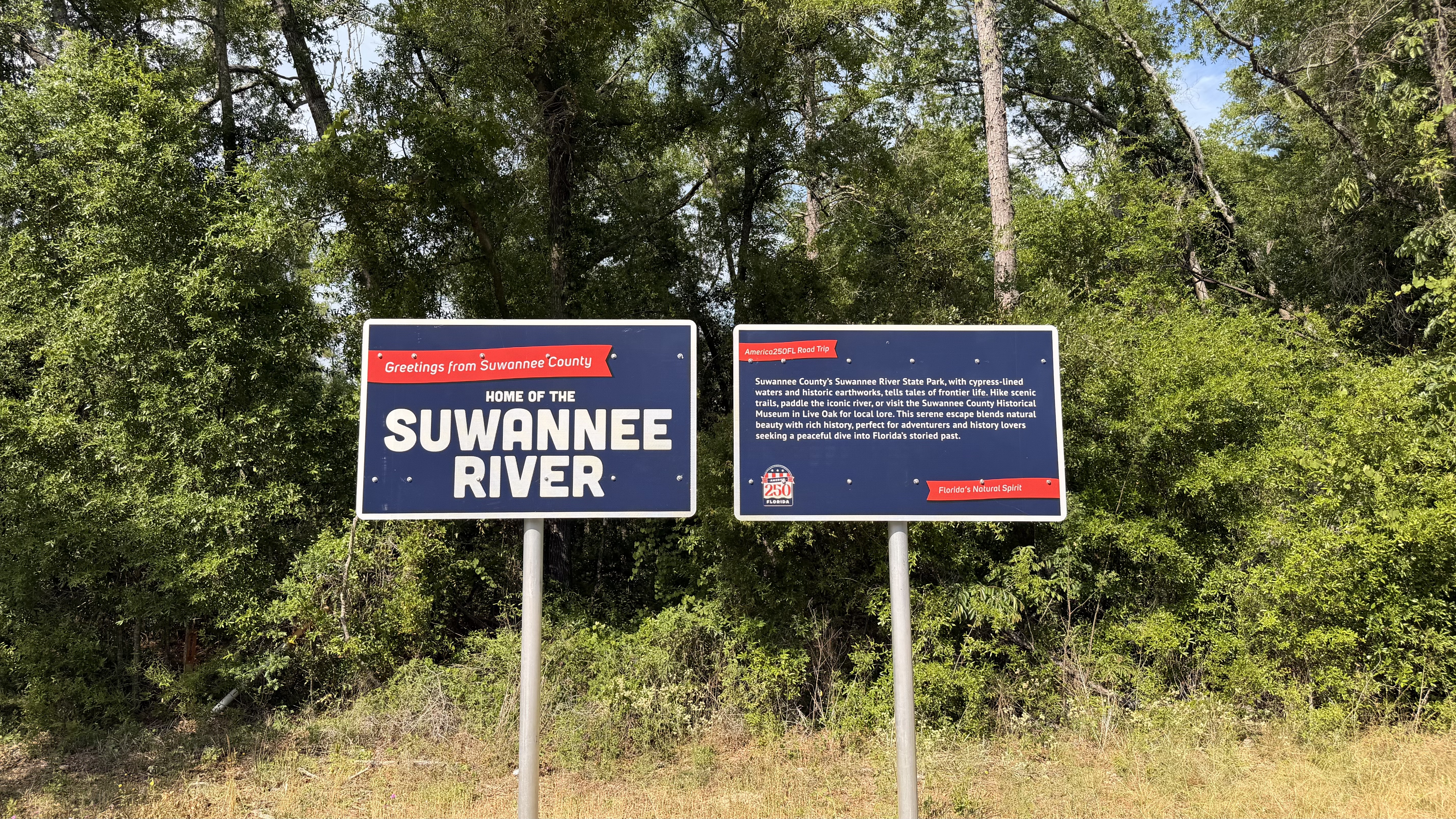
America250FL Roadtrip Sign
