= Bishop B. Blackwell House =

Historic house in Florida, United States

- U.S. National Register of Historic Places
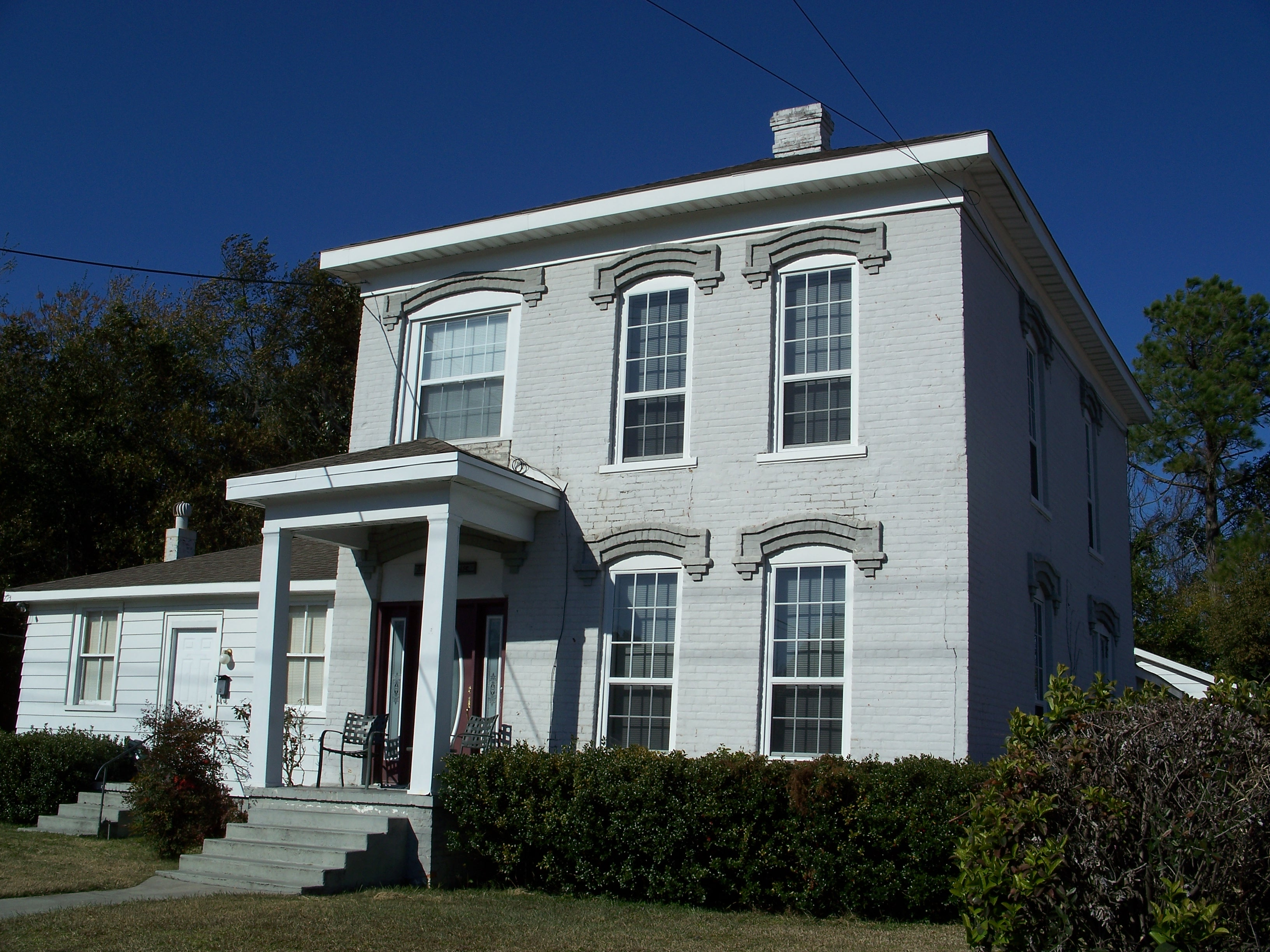

- Location within Florida Location within the United States
- Location: Live Oak, Florida
- Coordinates: 30°17′38″N 82°59′11″W
- Built: 1886
- NRHP reference No.: 85000360
- Added to NRHP: February 28, 1985

The Bishop B. Blackwell House (also known as the Weldon House) is a historic house located at 110 Parshley Street, off U.S. 129 in Live Oak, Florida. It was completed circa 1887 by banker and state legislator Bishop Bascom Blackwell. It is believed to be the oldest exiting brick house in North Florida and moved to its present location in 1910 to make way for the Live Oak Post Office next door.

== Description and history ==
The house, which was built in 1886, is unusual in comparison to other local houses of the same period due to its brick veneer and single side hall plan. The urban character of the house was originally more subtle, with a two-story veranda that surrounded it on all sides. The veranda was demolished when the house was moved back from the street, and was subsequently replaced with a front porch.

It was added to the National Register of Historic Places on February 28, 1985.

== Gallery ==
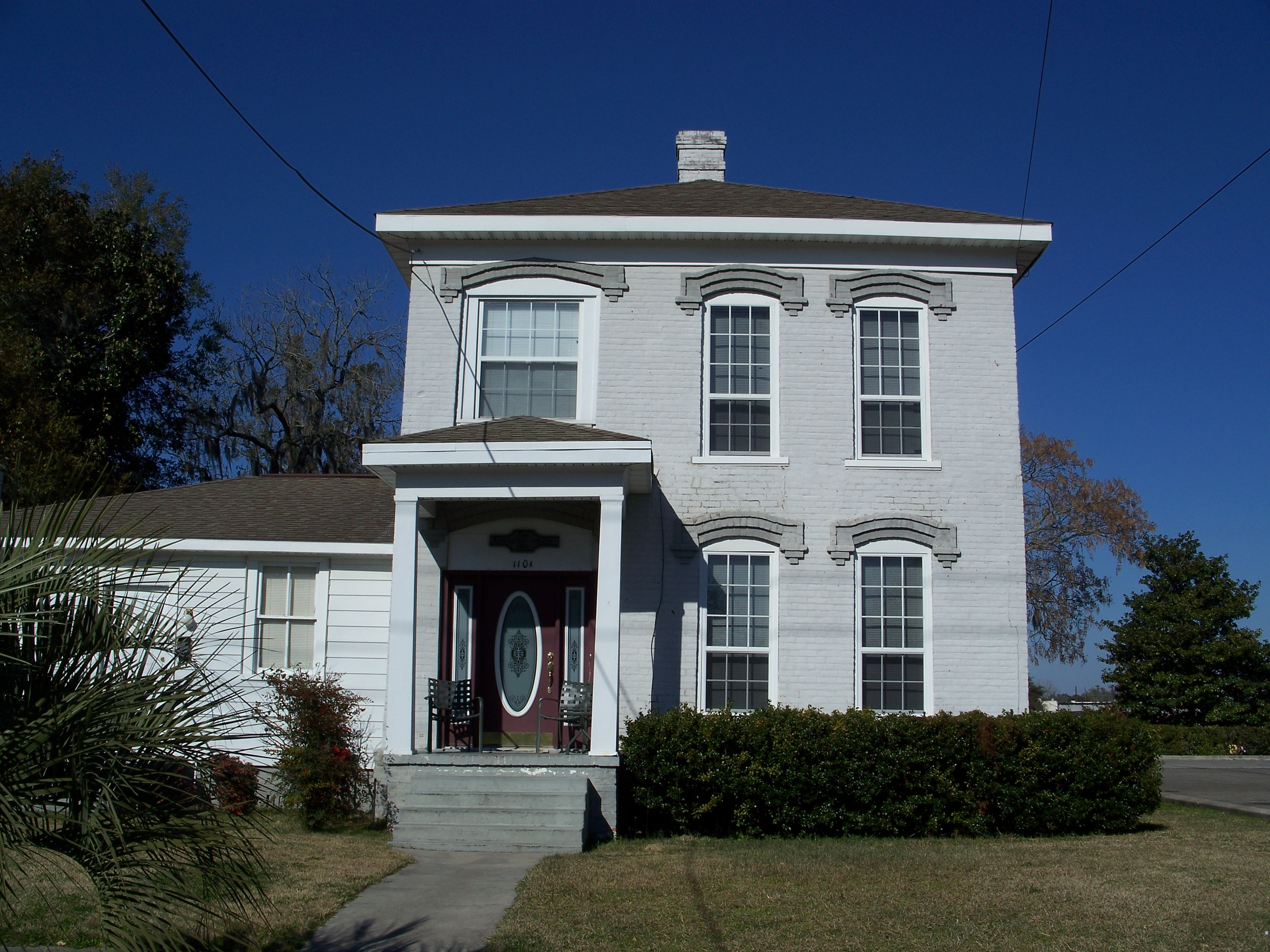

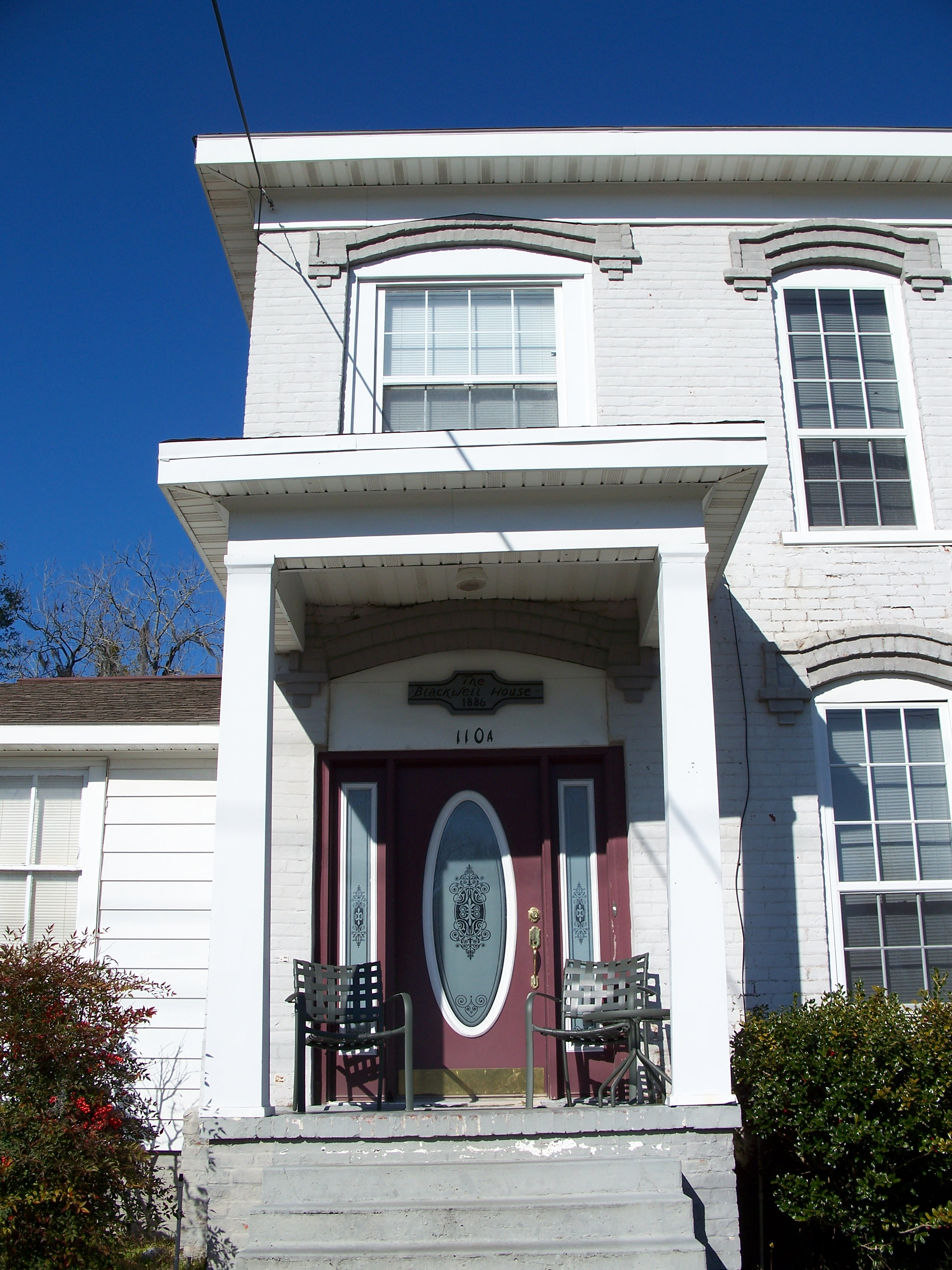

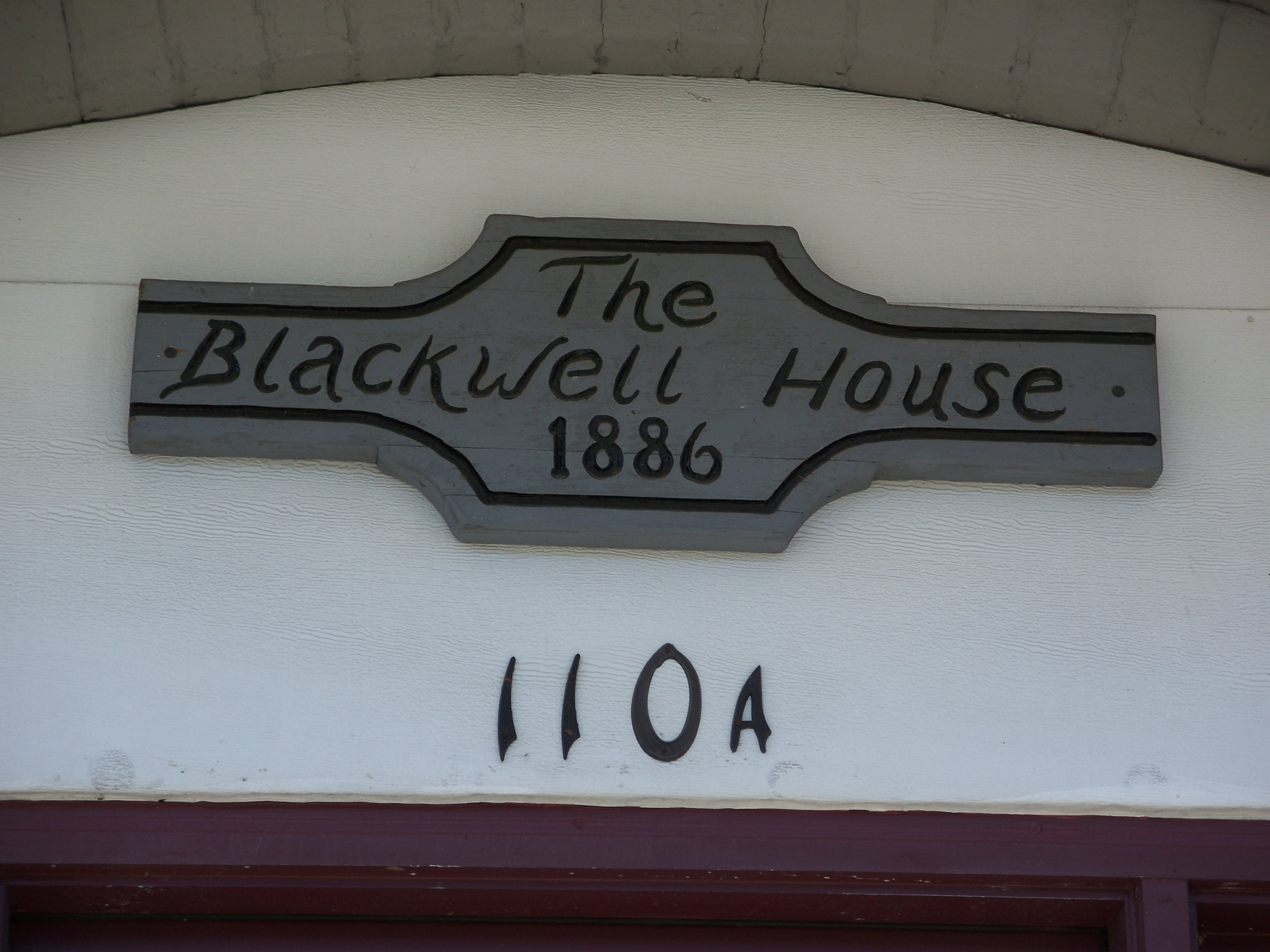
