= Suwannee Springs, Florida =

- Unincorporated community
- Location within Florida
- Coordinates: 30°23′39″N 82°56′14″W
- Country: United States
- State: Florida
- County: Suwannee
- Elevation: 79 ft (24 m)
- Time zone: UTC-5 (Eastern (EST))
  - Summer (DST): UTC-4 (EDT)
- Area code: 386
- GNIS feature ID: 291917

Suwannee Springs (also spelled Suwanee Springs) is an unincorporated community located on the Suwannee River in Suwannee County, Florida, United States. At least six springs comprise Suwannee Springs, of which five spill directly into the south side of the Suwannee River. The main spring flows inside a man-made wall fifteen feet high and three feet thick of limestone rock, this wall was built in the late 1890s. Suwannee Springs was a resort destination from the 1830s until the early 1900s. There was once a large hotel and many cabins here for guests to stay in. The hotel burned in the early 1900s and was never rebuilt.

Suwannee Springs is a second magnitude spring with an average flow of 23.4 cubic feet per second (cfs). The spring emerges from Oligocene age limestone and discharges hard, sulphur water. The water maintains a year-round temperature of 70 to 76 degrees.

== See also ==
- Suwannee Springs
