= Twin Rivers State Forest =

State forest in Florida, United States

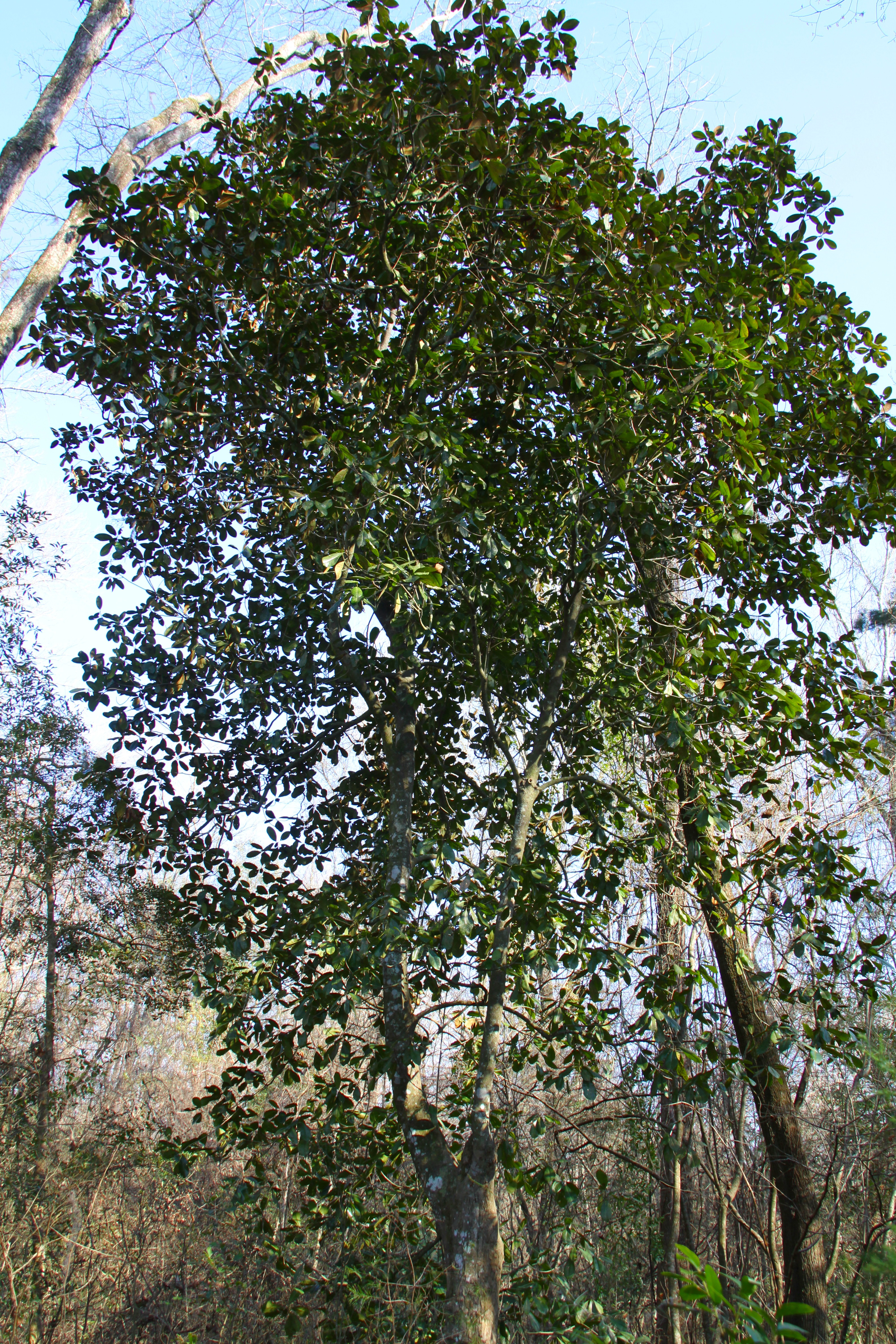
- Wild Magnolia grandiflora, Anderson Springs Trail, Twin Rivers State Forest, Suwannee County, Florida.

- Location within Florida Location within the United States
- Location: Hamilton, Madison and Suwannee counties, Florida
- Nearest city: Live Oak
- Coordinates: 30.3685742°N 83.202408°W
- Area: 14,882 acres (6,023 ha)
- Governing body: Florida Department of Environmental Protection

The Twin Rivers State Forest is in the US state of Florida. The 14,882-acre (60 km^{2}) forest is located in North Central Florida, along the banks of the Withlacoochee and Suwannee rivers.

According to the Florida Department of Agriculture's official website, Twin Rivers State Forest is composed of 15 noncontiguous tracts. In geographical order from south to north, the tracts consist of the Mill Creek South Tract then the North Tract along the west bank of the Suwannee. The Anderson Springs Tract is the first one along the east side of the river, which is across from the Black Tract and Damascus Tract, both of which are on the south side of I-10. The Ellaville Tract runs along the southern edge of I-10, but access to the forest is available primarily along US 90, as well as the southern terminus of Madison CR 141. This segment is the only one shared by both the Suwannee and Withlacoochee Rivers and is located across the rivers from Suwannee River State Park. Focusing more on the Withlacoochee River now, the Nekoosa Tract can be seen along the east bank of the river. The Withlacoochee Tract and the Blue Springs Longleaf Tract can be found along Florida State Road 6. The former is across the river from Madison Blue Spring State Park, and the latter is also along SR 6's overlap with Hamilton CR 143.

North of these are the Chitty Bend West and East Tracts. The Hardee Springs Tract and Westwood East Tract are located on the opposite side of the Withlacoochee West Conservation Area, and the Westwood West Tract is located north of this conservation area on the opposite side of the river. The Sullivan Tract is along Madison and Hamilton County Road 150, and Deese Tract, a narrow strip on the east bank of the Withlacoochee.

The forest contains sandhill, floodplain, swamp, and sinkhole habitats. Springs occur on the Anderson Springs and Withlacoochee tracts.

== See also ==
- List of Florida state forests
- List of Florida state parks
