= Trysten Hill =

American football player (born 1998)

Profile
- Position: Defensive tackle

Personal information
- Born: March 25, 1998 (age 28); Lee, Florida, U.S.
- Listed height: 6 ft 3 in (1.91 m)
- Listed weight: 310 lb (141 kg)

Career information
- High school: Suwannee (Live Oak, Florida)
- College: UCF (2016–2018)
- NFL draft: 2019: 2nd round, 58th overall pick

Career history
- Dallas Cowboys (2019–2022); Arizona Cardinals (2022); Cleveland Browns (2023)*; New England Patriots (2023–2024); Indianapolis Colts (2024)*
- * Offseason or practice squad member only

Awards and highlights
- National Champion (2017); Second-team All-AAC (2017)

Career NFL statistics as of Week 3, 2024
- Total tackles: 39
- Sacks: 1.5
- Stats at Pro Football Reference

Trysten Hill (born March 25, 1998) is an American professional football defensive tackle. He played college football for the UCF Knights, and was selected in the second round of the 2019 NFL draft by the Dallas Cowboys.

== Early life ==
Hill attended Suwannee High School in Live Oak, Florida, where he played as a defensive end. As a junior, he contributed to the team reaching the state semifinals and received All-area honors.

As a senior, he helped the team reach the FHSAA 5A regional finals and received Florida Class 5A All-State first-team honors. He was rated as a three-star recruit prospect, per ESPN.

== College career ==
Hill originally committed to the Georgia Institute of Technology and then University of Virginia to play college football, before ultimately deciding to enroll at the University of Central Florida (UCF). As a true freshman, he started 13 games at defensive end, collecting 15 tackles (5 for loss), one sack, one quarterback hurry and one forced fumble.

As a sophomore, he started 13 games at defensive tackle, posting 20 tackles (4 for loss), 2 sacks and 5 quarterback hurries.

As a junior, it was reported that he fell out of favor with the coaching staff and only started one out of 12 games at defensive tackle. He registered 36 tackles, 3 sacks, 10.5 tackles for loss, while also having 2 carries for one rushing yard and one touchdown. He had 6 tackles, (3 for loss) and 2 sacks against the University of Memphis in the American Athletic Conference championship game. He was a part of a 25-game winning streak that ended against Louisiana State University in the 2019 Fiesta Bowl.

He finished his college career with 71 tackles and six sacks. After his junior season in 2018, he announced his intention to declare for the 2019 NFL draft.

== Professional career ==
Pre-draft measurables
Height	Weight	Arm length	Hand span	40-yard dash	10-yard split	20-yard split	20-yard shuttle	Three-cone drill	Vertical jump	Broad jump	Bench press	Wonderlic
6 ft 2 3/4 in (1.90 m)	308 lb (140 kg)	33 3/8 in (0.85 m)	10 1/4 in (0.26 m)	5.04 s	1.73 s	2.88 s	4.38 s	7.70 s	35 in (0.89 m)	9 ft 7 in (2.92 m)	28 reps	23
All values from NFL Combine

=== Dallas Cowboys ===
Hill was selected by the Dallas Cowboys in the second round (58th overall) in the 2019 NFL draft. He had an underwhelming season as a backup at the three-technique defensive tackle position behind Maliek Collins. Hill registered four tackles and three quarterback pressures in 121 snaps. He was declared inactive in nine games and appeared in just three contests after Week 7.

In 2020, after Collins left in free agency, he began the season as the starter at the three-technique defensive tackle position, after Gerald McCoy was lost for the season with a torn quadriceps injury. He was involved in a controversy during the Week 3 game against the Seattle Seahawks due to a tackle on running back Chris Carson, where Hill twisted Carson's knee after the play had ended, causing a sprain. Later in the same drive, Hill delivered a late, helmet-to-helmet hit on quarterback Russell Wilson, who was uninjured on the play. The league fined Hill $6,522 for each hit respectively, totaling $13,044. In Week 5 against the New York Giants, he tore his right ACL after pushing quarterback Daniel Jones and trying to hold him up to avoid a possible roughing the passer penalty. On October 19, he was placed on the injured reserve list. He started the first 5 games, while posting 14 tackles (one for loss) and 5 quarterback pressures.

On August 31, 2021, Hill was placed on the reserve/physically unable to perform list to start the season. He was activated on November 13. Hill had a season-high five tackles with two quarterback pressures on Thanksgiving Day against the Las Vegas Raiders. He was suspended one game after punching Raiders guard John Simpson in a postgame altercation after the Cowboys lost the game, 33–36. Hill was placed on the Reserve/COVID list for the games against the New York Giants (12/19) and Washington Commanders (12/26). His recovery from his previous injury and being passed on the depth chart by rookie Osa Odighizuwa, limited him to appear in only six games, registering 10 tackles, a half sack, and six quarterback pressures.

In 2022, Hill played in the first seven games of the season as a backup defensive tackle behind Odighizuwa. He was declared inactive for the eighth game against the Chicago Bears. On November 1, 2022, Hill was waived by the Cowboys, to make room for the return from injury of Tarell Basham. He appeared in seven games for Dallas, tallying six tackles and four quarterback pressures.

=== Arizona Cardinals ===
On November 2, 2022, Hill was claimed off waivers by the Arizona Cardinals, to replace an injured Rashard Lawrence. He was placed on injured reserve on December 28. Hill appeared in six games as a backup defensive tackle, collecting six tackles and one sack.

=== Cleveland Browns ===
On March 20, 2023, Hill signed a one-year contract with the Cleveland Browns. He was released by Cleveland on August 29, and was subsequently re-signed to the team's practice squad. Hill was released from the practice squad on September 26.

=== New England Patriots ===
On October 4, 2023, the New England Patriots signed Hill to their practice squad. On October 21, he was elevated to the active roster. Hill appeared in one game and did not record any statistics. On October 23, he reverted to the team's practice squad. Hill signed a reserve/future contract on January 8, 2024.

On August 28, 2024, Hill was released by the Patriots and re-signed to the practice squad. He was elevated to the active roster and appeared in two games with no stats recorded. Hill was released on October 10.

=== Indianapolis Colts ===
On November 18, 2024, Hill signed with the Indianapolis Colts' practice squad. On December 10, he was placed on the practice squad injured list. On December 30, Hill was released from the practice squad injured list.

== Personal life ==
On March 26, 2026, Hill was arrested in Waxahachie, Texas and charged with assault of a pregnant person as well as interfering with an emergency request for assistance.
