= Suwannee Springs =

Historic site in northern Florida, USA

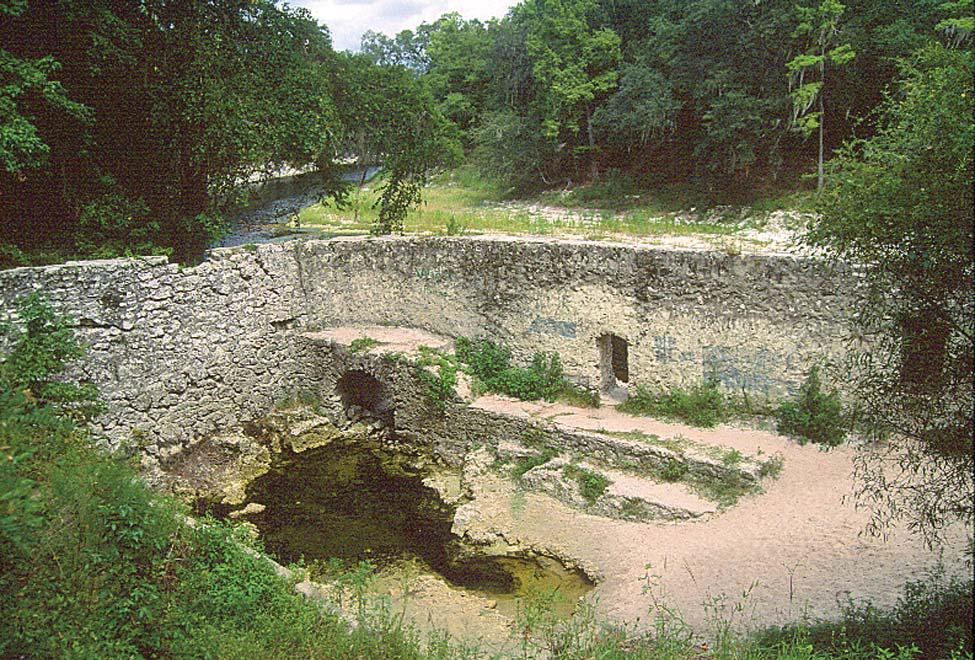
- Suwannee Springs bathhouse ruins
- Interactive map of Suwannee Springs
- 30°23′40.08″N 82°56′3.49″W
- Location: Suwannee Springs, Florida

Site notes
- Elevation: 79 feet (24 m)
- Area: 1,800 acres (730 ha)

For the unincorporated community see Suwannee Springs, Florida

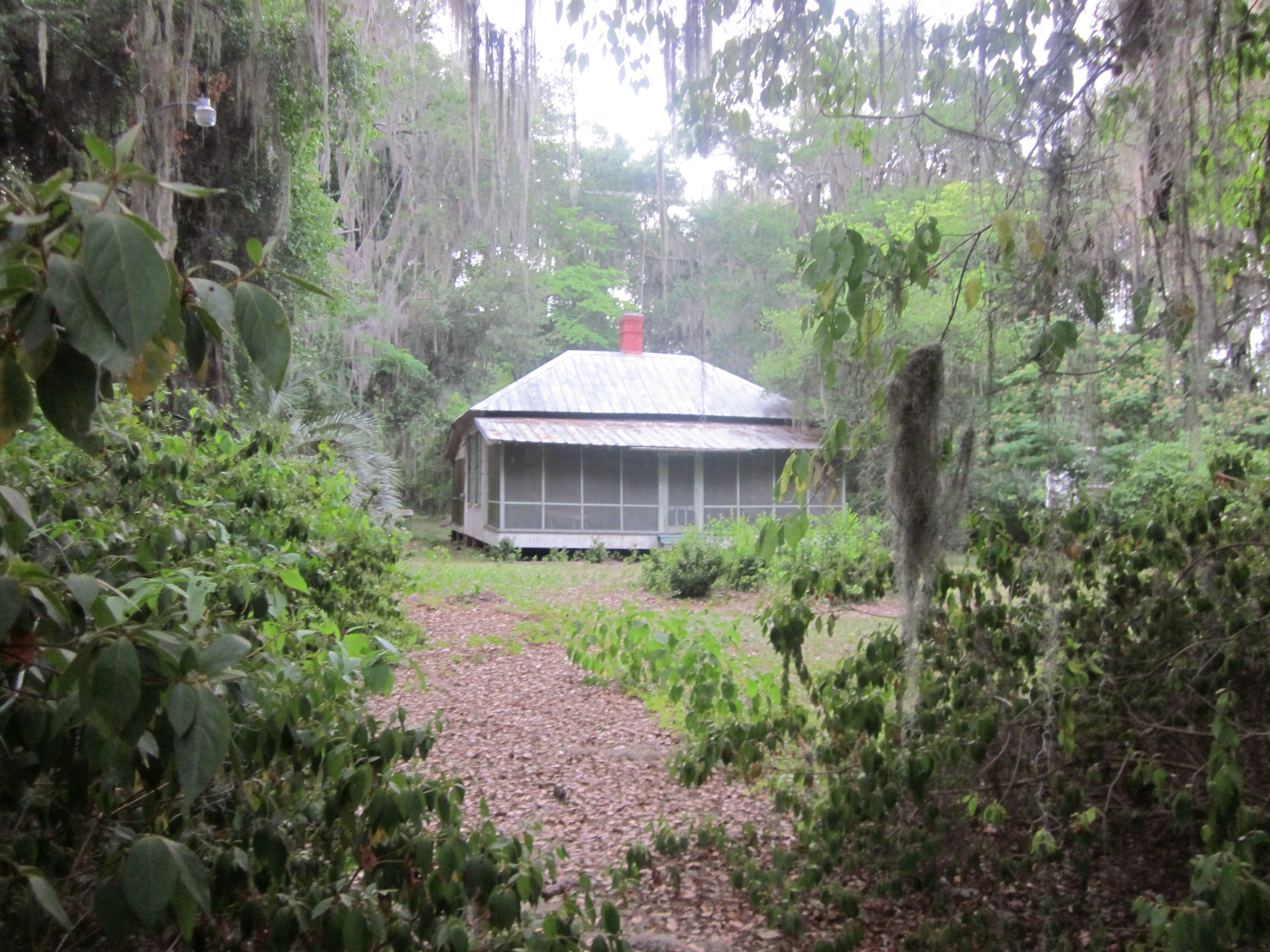
Cabin at Suwannee Springs, one of six remaining of the original 18 built

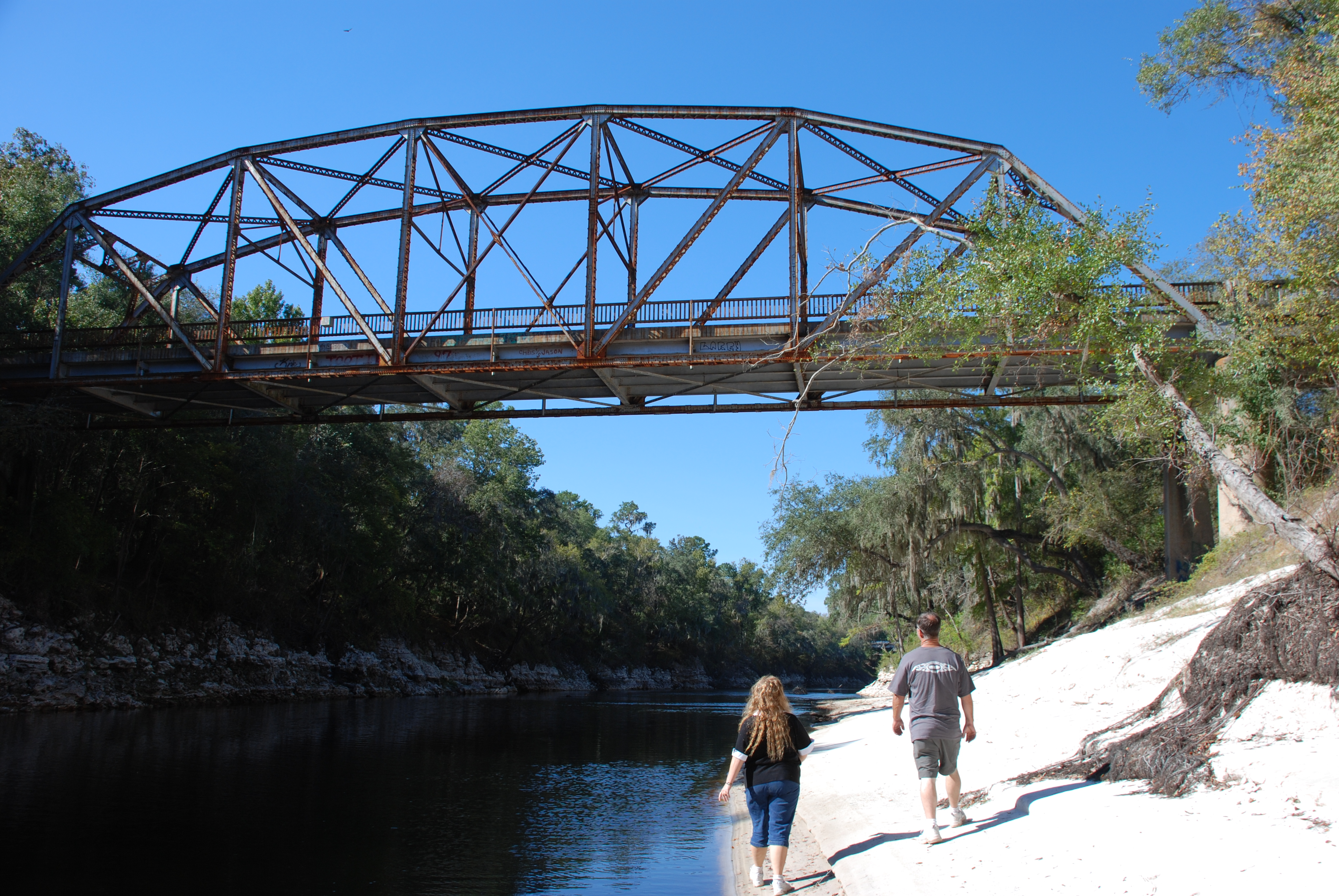
Suwannee Springs Bridge, built in the 1930s as part of U.S. Highway 129. It closed in 1974 when a new U.S. Highway 129 bridge was constructed

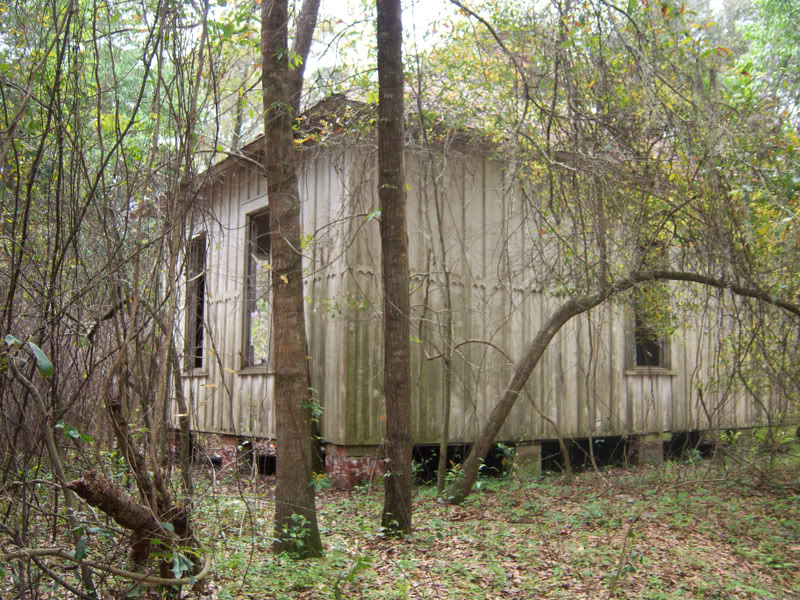
One of the original cabins owned by the Suwannee River Water Management District. It is in a deteriorated condition

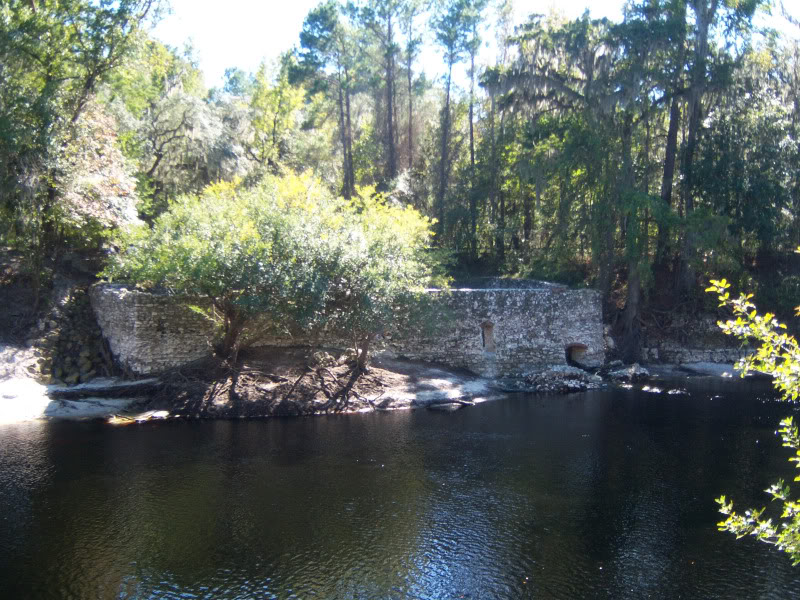
Bath house walls at the springs

Suwannee Springs, once known as Suwannee Sulphur Springs is the site of natural springs and was a historic mineral spring tourist attraction and hotel in Suwannee Springs, Florida near Live Oak, Florida. It is now managed by the Suwannee River Water Management District. The area offers swimming, hiking, and paddling opportunities.

At least six springs comprise Suwannee Springs, five spilling directly into the south side of the Suwannee River. The main spring flows inside a man-made wall 15 feet (4.6 m) high and 3 feet (0.91 m) thick of limestone rock built in the late 1890s.

Suwannee Springs is a second magnitude spring with an average flow of 23.4 cubic feet (0.66 m^{3}) per second. The spring emerges from Oligocene age limestone and discharges hard, sulphur water. The water maintains a year-round temperature of 70 °F (21 °C) to 76 °F (24 °C).

== History ==
The first known settler in the Suwannee Springs area was a man named Francis J. Ross, formerly of Jacksonville.

In 1831 he purchased the area of the springs & surrounding area and constructed a resort there. The resort was rather popular.

At the time, people thought that sulfurous water had healing powers that could cure various illnesses.

However, thanks to the onset of the Second Seminole War and the Financial Panic of 1837. It convinced Ross to sell the property in 1838.

After the Second Seminole War, with the addition of boats and bridges to the resort. It allowed easier access to the resort, allowing it to become a very popular tourist attraction in Florida.

After the American Civil War, the resort owners expanded the resort to include a spacious hotel, a trolley line, exercise courts, etc.

Later in the 1880's, a massive five-turreted wooden hotel with 125 rooms and a great open central square was built, made by Levi Scoville and Jesse Culpepper and finished around 1884. Sadly, the hotel burn't down a couple of months after its completion. So, a new hotel was built in 1885 and allowed easier access outside in the case of a fire. This hotel later caught fire itself around November, 1901. Though this didn't hurt the hotel's annex (which became the main hotel after the fire) and the surrounding 18 cottages.

Overtime, it was found out that sulfurous water didn't have any healing effects on the human body. And so, the attraction slowly died out. Finally, dying out by the time the hotel burn't down in 1925.

The Suwannee Springs is also the place where the Lynching of Willie James Howard took place.

== See also ==
- Suwannee River State Park
- List of Florida state parks
- Florida state forests
