= Old Live Oak City Hall =

- U.S. National Register of Historic Places
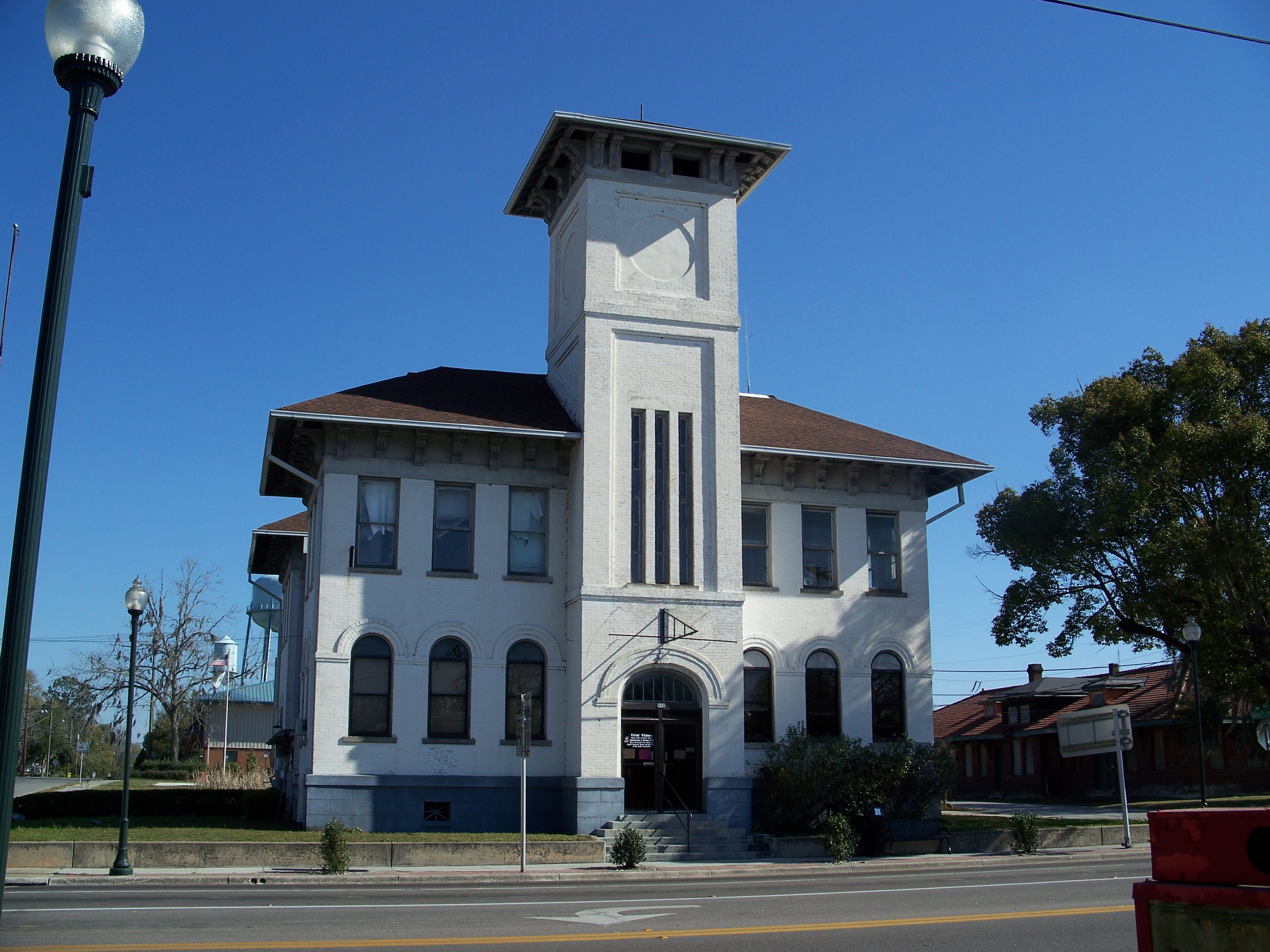

- Location within Florida Location within the United States
- Location: Live Oak, Florida
- Coordinates: 30°17′50″N 82°59′0″W
- Built: 1908-1909
- Architect: Paul Walker, James Peavy
- Architectural style: Italian Villa
- NRHP reference No.: 86000862
- Added to NRHP: April 24, 1986

The Old Live Oak City Hall (also known as the City of Live Oak Police and Fire Department) is a historic site in Live Oak, Florida, United States. It is located at 212 North Ohio Avenue, between West Duval Street Northeast and Haines Street Northeast. On April 24, 1986, it was added to the U.S. National Register of Historic Places. The old city hall is one block north of the Union Depot and Atlantic Coast Line Freight Station.
