= Live Oak Union Depot =

- Union Depot and Atlantic Coast Line Freight Station
- U.S. National Register of Historic Places
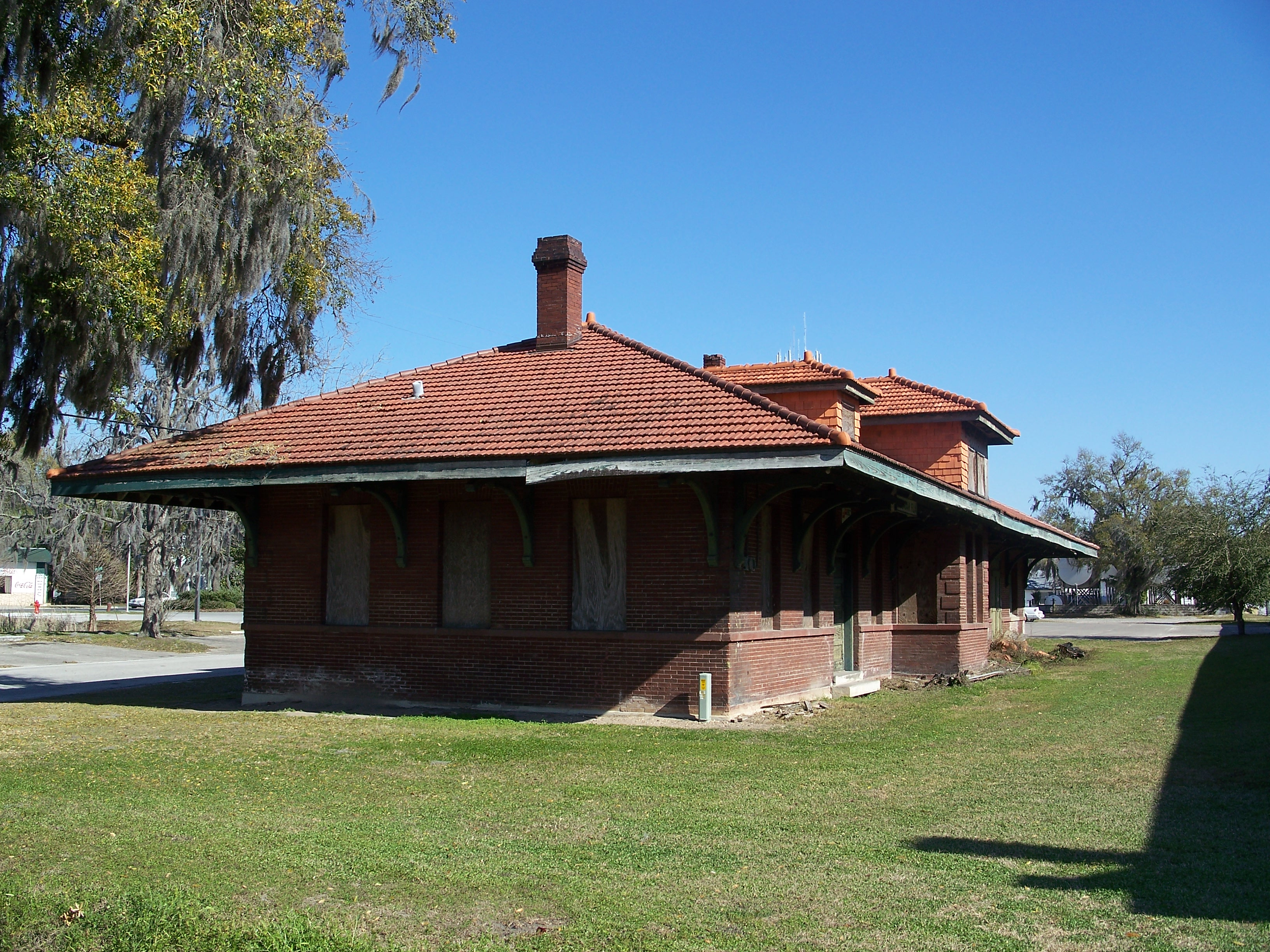
- Union Depot

- Location within Florida Location within the United States
- Location: Live Oak, Florida
- Coordinates: 30°17′49″N 82°59′1″W
- Built: 1903, 1909
- Architectural style: Masonry Vernacular with Romanesque Revival elements
- NRHP reference No.: 86000860
- Added to NRHP: April 24, 1986

Live Oak is a former railroad station in Live Oak, Florida. It is located at 208 North Ohio Avenue, on the corner of Haines Street Northeast. The station was built at one of two junctions of an Atlantic Coast Line Railroad and Seaboard Air Line Railroad lines. It also served the Florida Railway (a line leading to the Mayo area), as well as the Live Oak, Perry and Gulf Railroad.

The station was a flag stop on the SCL and Louisville and Nashville's Gulf Wind, between Madison and Live Oak, and until 1966 an additional daily local train served the station as well. The ACL and the SAL merged in 1967 to form the Seaboard Coast Line Railroad. In 1971 the SCL terminated the Gulf Wind, on the creation of Amtrak, ending passenger service in Live Oak.

On April 24, 1986, it was added to the U.S. National Register of Historic Places. When Amtrak extended the Sunset Limited to Orlando in 1993 the nearest station with a stop was in Lake City. Today, only the former SAL line survives.

The Suwannee County Historical Museum is located in the depot. Exhibits include a telephone display, a 16th-century Timucaun Indian Village recreation and local history artifacts. The station is one block south of the Old Live Oak City Hall.

== Gallery ==
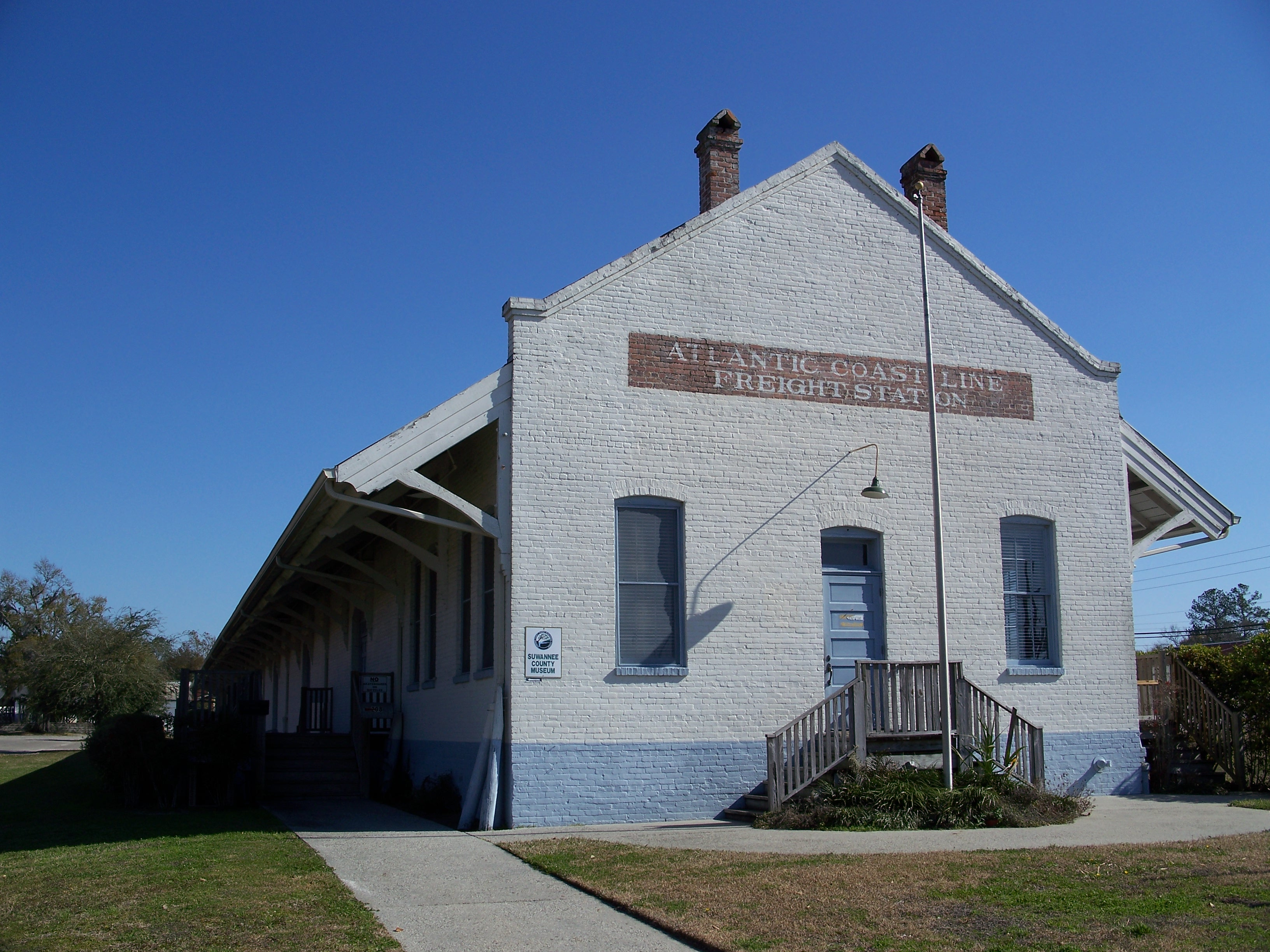
Atlantic Coast Line Freight Station

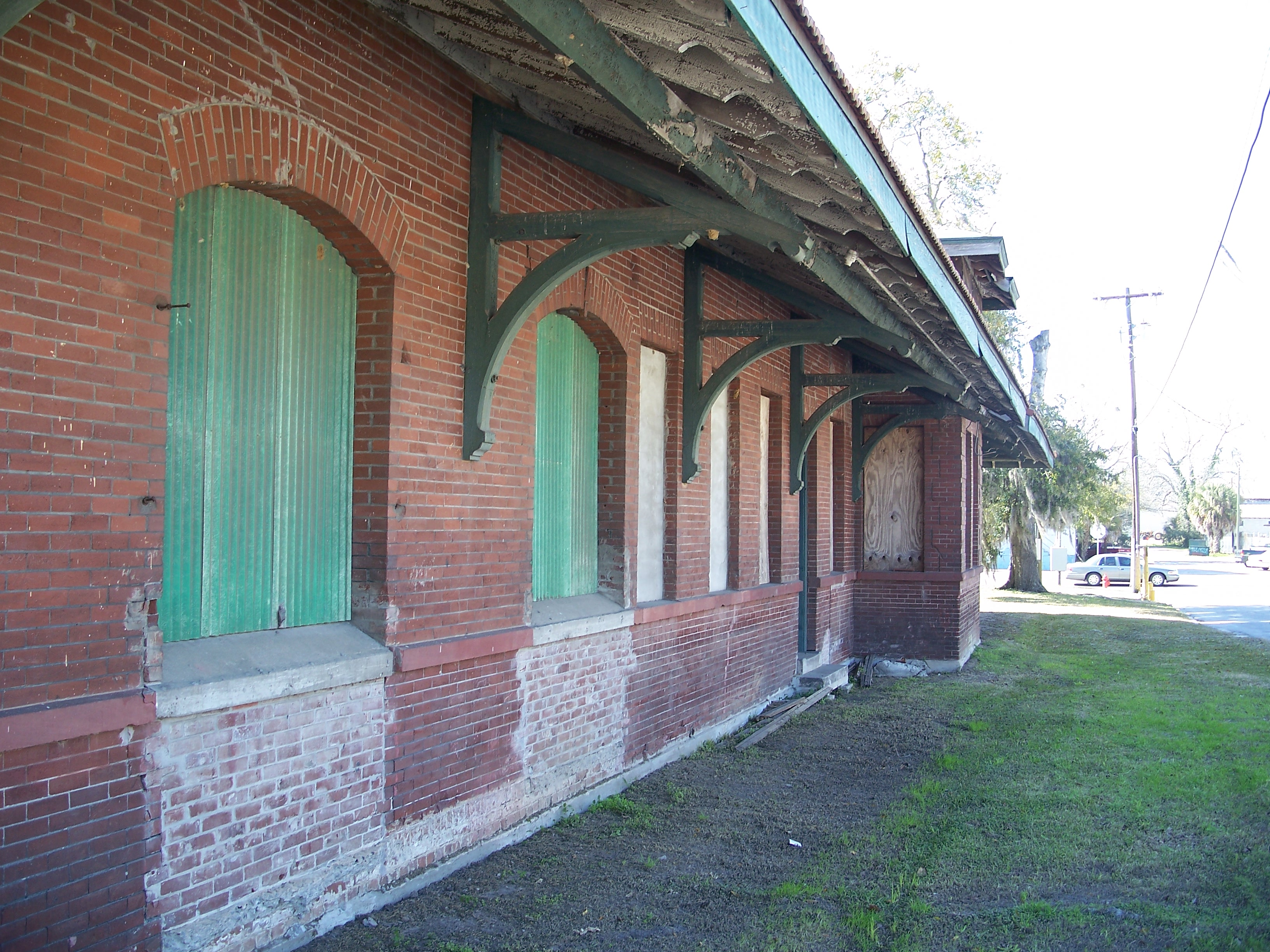

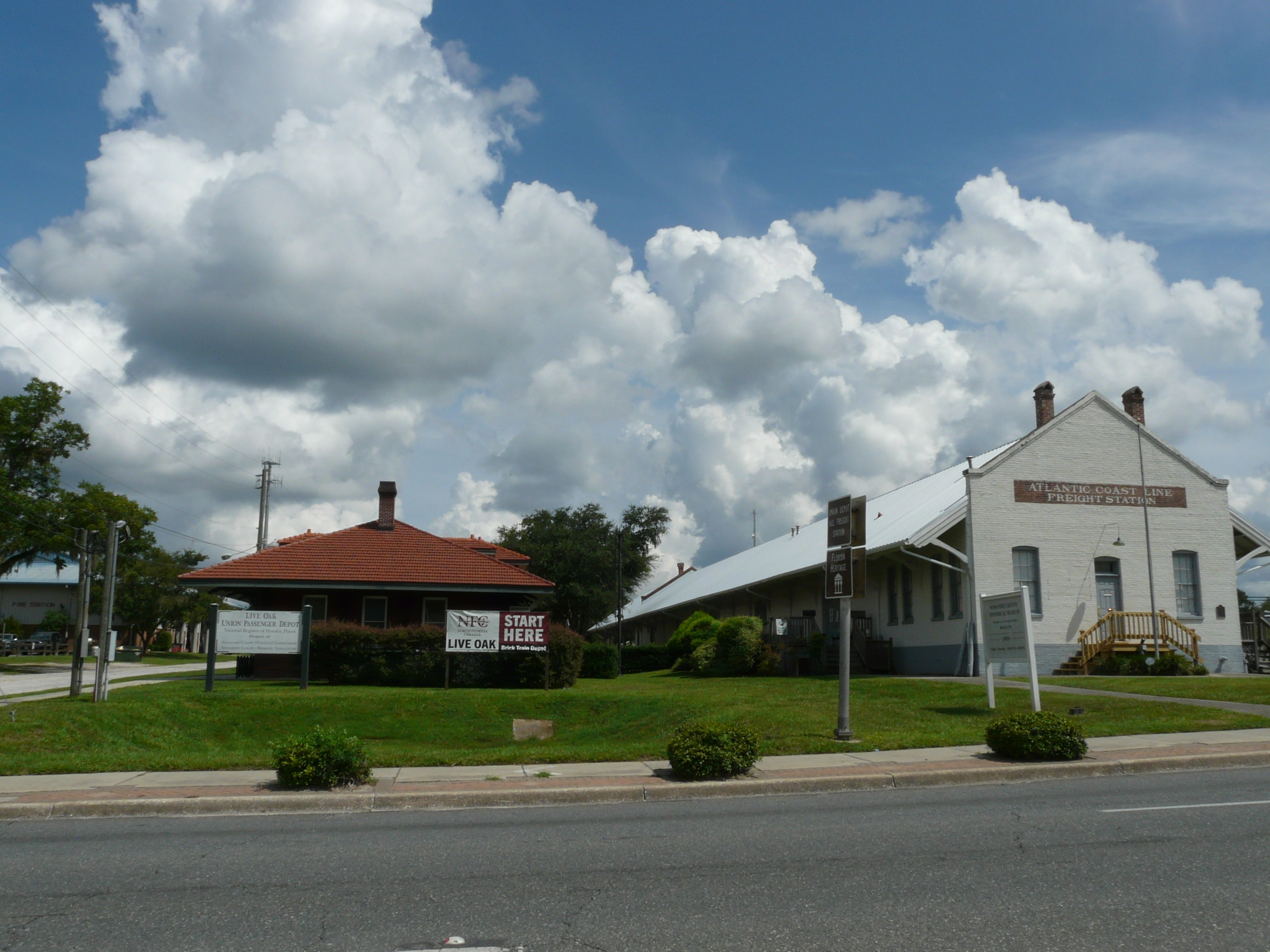
Depot and old Freight Station

Preceding station	Atlantic Coast Line Railroad	Following station
Former services
Suwanee toward Dupont	Dupont – High Springs	Padlock toward High Springs
Preceding station	Seaboard Air Line Railroad	Following station
Falmouth toward River Junction	Tallahassee Subdivision	Houston toward Jacksonville
