= Suwannee County Courthouse =

- U.S. National Register of Historic Places
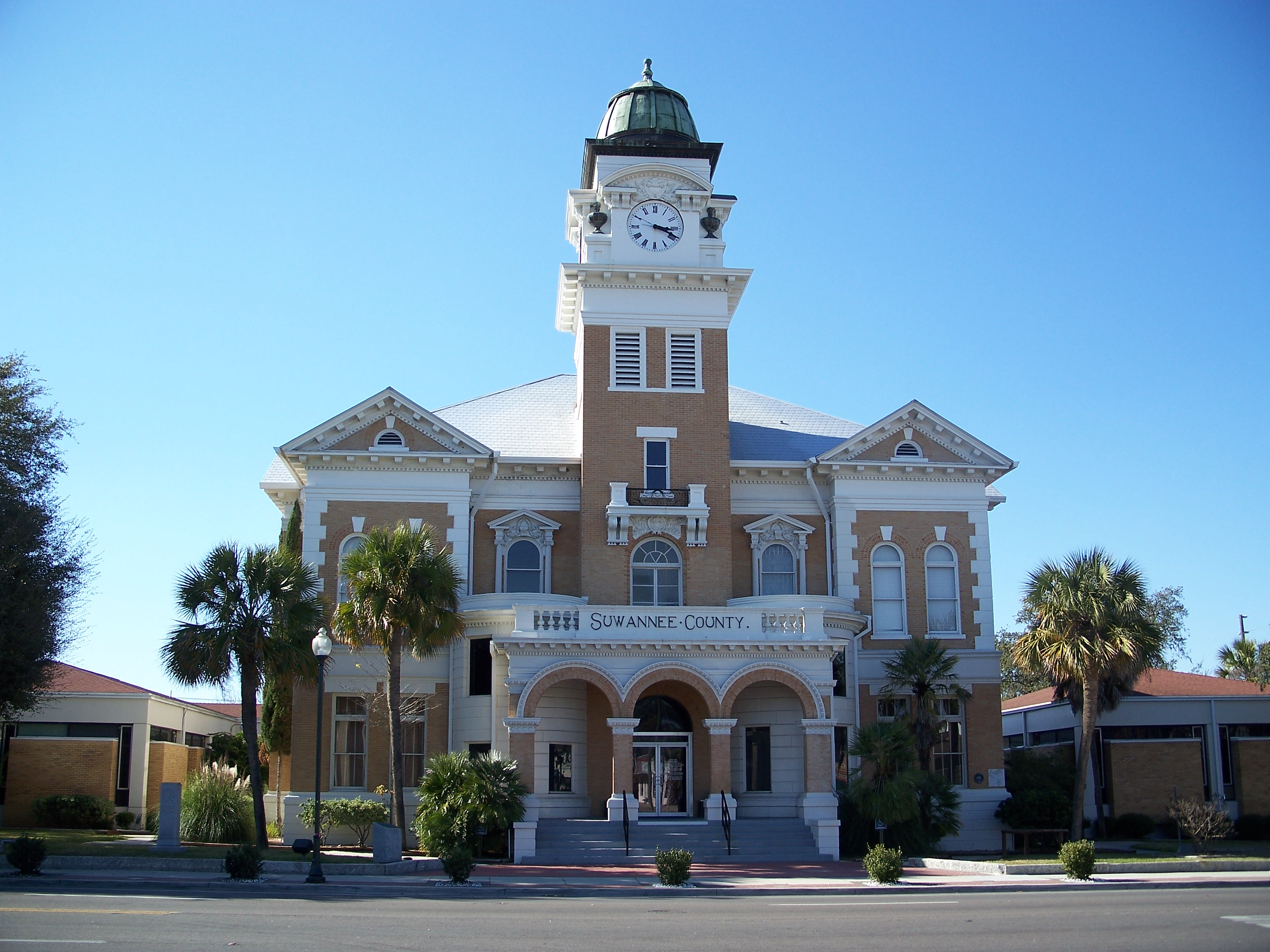

- Location within Florida Location within the United States
- Interactive map showing the location for Suwannee County Courthouse
- Location: 200 South Ohio Avenue, Live Oak, Florida
- Coordinates: 30°17′43″N 82°59′7″W
- Built: 1889-1904
- Architect: Benjamin B. Smith (architect), Hugger Brothers (contractors)
- Architectural style: Renaissance Revival
- NRHP reference No.: 98001349
- Added to NRHP: November 12, 1998

The Suwannee County Courthouse (constructed in 1904) is a historic government building located at 200 South Ohio Avenue on the southwest corner of Warren Street in Live Oak, Florida. On November 12, 1998, it was added to the U.S. National Register of Historic Places.
