= Live Oak, Florida =

City of Live Oak
- City
- Live Oak, Florida
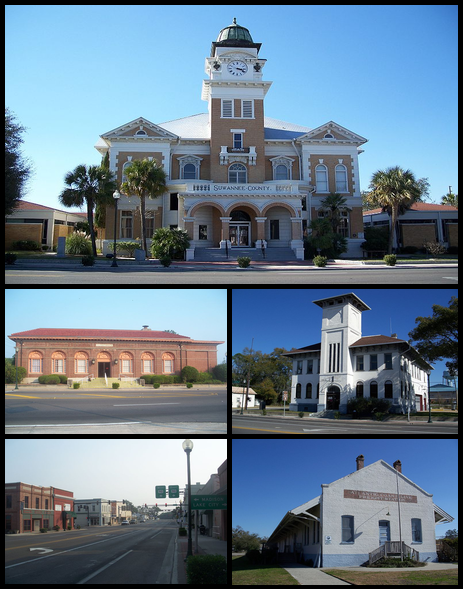
- Suwannee County Courthouse, Old Post Office, Old Live Oak City Hall, Downtown Live Oak, ACL Freight Station

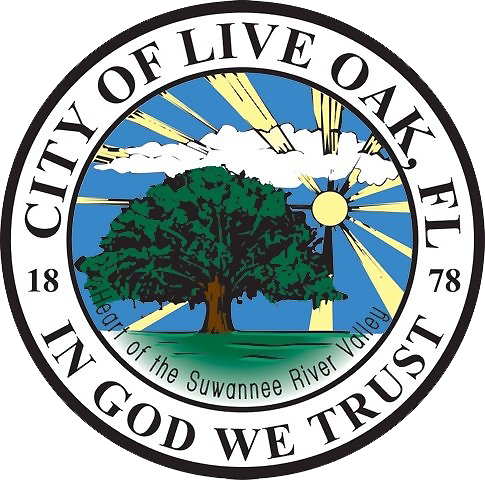
- Seal
- Nickname: The City of Nature
- Motto(s): "A Caring Community" "Heart of the Suwannee River Valley" "In God We Trust"
- Location in Suwannee County and the state of Florida
- Coordinates: 30°17′40″N 82°59′9″W
- Country: United States
- State: Florida
- County: Suwannee
- Incorporated (town): 1878
- Incorporated (city): 1903

Government
  - Type: Mayor–Council
  - Mayor: Frank C. Davis
  - Councilmembers: Tommie Jefferson, Lynda Owens, David Burch, Matt Campbell, and Tesie Allen
  - City Manager: Larry Sessions
  - City Clerk: John W. Gill

Area
  - Total: 7.63 sq mi (19.76 km^{2})
  - Land: 7.63 sq mi (19.76 km^{2})
  - Water: 0.0039 sq mi (0.01 km^{2})
- Elevation: 105 ft (32 m)

Population (2020)
  - Total: 6,735
  - Density: 882.8/sq mi (340.87/km^{2})
- Time zone: UTC-5 (Eastern (EST))
  - Summer (DST): UTC-4 (EDT)
- ZIP codes: 32060, 32064
- Area code: 386
- FIPS code: 12-40875
- GNIS feature ID: 0285862
- Website: www.cityofliveoak.org

Live Oak is a city and the county seat of Suwannee County, Florida, United States. The city is midway between Tallahassee and Jacksonville. As of the 2020 census, Live Oak had a population of 6,735.

U.S. Highway 90, U.S. Highway 129 and Interstate 10 are major highways running through Live Oak.

Freight service is provided by the Florida Gulf & Atlantic Railroad, which acquired most of the former CSX main line from Pensacola to Jacksonville on June 1, 2019.

It is served by the Suwannee County Airport as well as many private airparks scattered throughout the county.

There is also a community named Live Oak in Washington County, Florida.

== History ==
=== 19th century ===
Built along the Pensacola & Georgia Railroad in or prior to 1861, Live Oak was named for a southern live oak tree under which railroad workers rested and ate lunch. When a railroad depot was built nearby, the small community that sprang up around it was called “Live Oak Station” (first mentioned in records in 1861). The tree was at the site of the present-day Pepe's Mexican Grocery on U.S. 90.

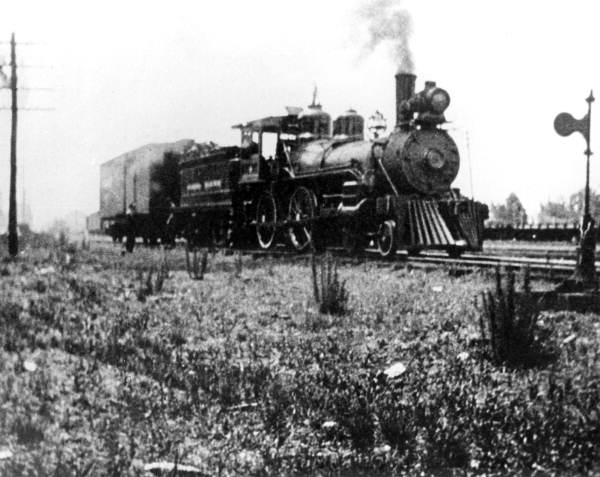
Florida Railway engine #3 at the Seaboard yards in Live Oak circa 1915

During the Civil War, the Pensacola & Georgia Railroad served as a vital route for parts of North Florida. Defensive earthworks were built where it crossed the Suwannee River west of Live Oak, to deter Union attacks. These earthworks still exist as part of the Suwannee River State Park, one of Florida's first State parks.

To ease supply problems to other parts of the Confederacy, the Confederate government decided to create a north–south railroad link into Georgia through Live Oak. The railroad junction was completed in early 1865. It was too late to help the Confederacy, but it opened up the interior of the county to settlement in the postwar period.

An infamous resident of the town was Lewis Powell, one of John Wilkes Booth's co-conspirators in the assassination of President Abraham Lincoln. At the age of 13, he had moved with his family from Alabama to Live Oak. He lived there until the age of 17, when he lied about his age to enlist with the 2nd Florida Infantry Regiment in the Confederate army.

In 1868 the legislature designated Live Oak as the county seat of Suwannee County. An election held the following year confirmed Live Oak as the county seat, and it has continued in this role. Live Oak was incorporated as a town in 1878. In 1903, it was incorporated as a city and was the largest community in Suwannee County. It served as a minor railroad hub for the region.

During Reconstruction, Live Oak suffered extensive violence by white supremacists against Black citizens. They attacked and assaulted Blacks to discourage their voting, to maintain dominance, and to expel Blacks from the community.

=== 20th century ===
In the 1905 State census, Live Oak was the fifth-largest city in Florida (behind Jacksonville, Pensacola, Tampa, and Key West, in that order), and the largest inland city. Nearby resorts at Suwannee Springs and Dowling Park (formerly Hudson-upon-the-Suwannee) drew thousands of visitors from around the world to the sulfur springs and related nearby sports, boating, and hunting activities. The health benefits of the springs were touted in magazines and newspapers worldwide, supposedly curing everything from arthritis to “female problems”.

During the first decade of the twentieth century, Live Oak saw a construction boom. Notable buildings such as the Suwannee County Courthouse, Live Oak City Hall, and Suwannee Hotel were completed. Dozens of fine two- and three-story homes were erected along the major streets. By 1913, the main streets were bricked and a sewage system had been built.

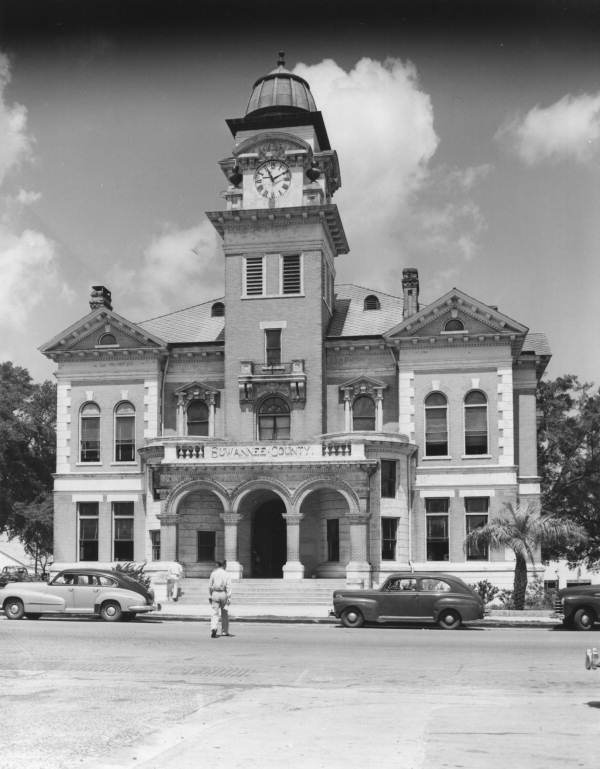
Suwannee County Courthouse in 1948

Live Oak was surpassed as a destination when explosive growth occurred in south Florida. At the same time, people lost belief in the healing power of sulfur waters. Cotton crops were devastated by the boll weevil near the end of the First World War, which nearly finished off the economies of the city and county. Business stagnated with the coming of the Great Depression.

But, despite their relatively small populations, Live Oak and Suwannee County remained politically powerful for another four decades. The white and rural-dominated state legislature had resisted the required redistricting that would follow demographic changes throughout the state. Finally, after a United States Supreme Court ruling in 1964 for "one person, one vote", the state legislature redistricted. Southern Florida received its due in the number of state and congressional representatives to reflect its greatly increased population in relation to other areas of the state.

Ruby Strickland, former postmistress of the community of Dowling Park, was elected as mayor of Live Oak in 1924. She was the first female elected as mayor south of the Mason–Dixon line after universal suffrage was enacted in 1919. Strickland served two non-consecutive terms and represented the area at the Democratic National Convention of 1936.

In 1940, the men of the local National Guard unit, Company E of the 124th Infantry (historically called the Suwannee Rifles), were mustered into service for one year of training at Camp Blanding, Florida. A week after the December 7, 1941 surprise Japanese attack on Pearl Harbor, Hawaii, the unit was assigned to the 31st Division at Fort Benning, Georgia, to serve as a model infantry training unit. The unit was briefly deactivated in 1944, but reactivated the following month after many of the original men had been dispersed to other units; members served in both the European and Pacific theaters of war during World War II.

Florida National Guard historian Robert Hawk noted that, "In the course of the Second World War, no unit of the Florida National Guard had more men killed, wounded in action, or dead from other causes than Company E, 124th Infantry." The Live Oak unit was reorganized several times over the years as infantry, tank, and engineering companies; as of 2019, it served as the 868th Engineer Company. The unit has purportedly been called up to serve more than any other unit in Florida.

In 1944, 15 year-old African American Willie James Howard was lynched in Live Oak, ostensibly for having "expressed his affections" to a white girl. He was murdered by a group of white men including the girl's father, former state legislator A.P. "Phil" Goff. They kidnapped Howard, bound him, and forced him to jump off a bridge. A Suwannee County grand jury failed to indict Goff or the other white men. Media attention to Live Oak in the aftermath of the death of Willie James Howard increased awareness of lynching in the United States.

In 1948, Live Oak and Suwannee County received their first public hospital. It was completed under the Hill-Burton Act, which provided Federal funding for health care facilities to rural areas. The Suwannee County Hospital was initially segregated, and served only white citizens of the region until after passage of civil rights legislation in the 1960s. African Americans went to Brewster Hospital. The Suwanee County facility was replaced in the early 1990s.

In 1952, national attention was drawn to Live Oak and the county when Ruby McCollum, a wealthy African American, shot and killed Dr. Clifford Leroy Adams, Jr. He was a prominent, white, recently elected to the state senate. The fatal shooting took place in his medical office, across from the Suwannee County Courthouse. Investigators at first thought the shooting was related to an unpaid doctor's bill.

But it was soon revealed that the married Dr. Adams had fathered a child with McCollum, who was also married. She testified that he forced her into a sexual relationship. (Adams knew that her husband Sam oversaw an illegal "bolita" gaming operation and was said to benefit by it as well). Author Zora Neale Hurston was covering the trial for the Pittsburgh Courier and characterized this abuse of an African-American woman by a powerful white man as an assertion of paramour rights, which had also existed in the South under slavery.

McCollum's murder conviction and death sentence were overturned on a technicality in 1954. Before a second trial, her defense attorney gained a certification that she was mentally unfit to stand trial. She was held for the next twenty years in the Florida State Mental Hospital in Chattahoochee. She was released to her family after being assessed as no danger to herself or anyone else. The murder and events surrounding it have been the subject of numerous books and documentaries in the 21st century.

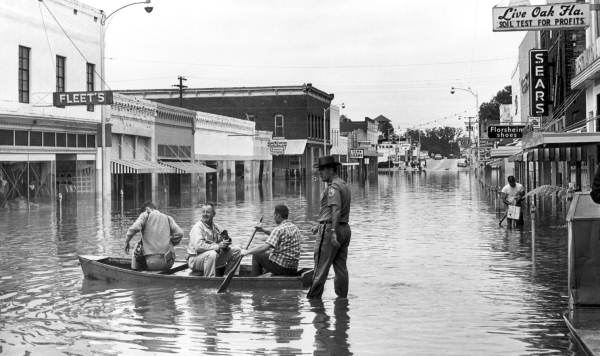
Downtown Live Oak, flooded from Hurricane Dora in 1964

In the 1950s, the rest of Suwannee County received electricity and telephone service, something the City of Live Oak had since the late 1800s. In 1957, the Florida Sheriffs Association received property north of Live Oak for use as a Boys’ Ranch. Opening in 1958, this facility has continued to be used to help troubled boys from all of Florida; later, a Girls' Ranch and Youth Villa were constructed in other parts of the state for girls and sibling groups.

In September 1964, Hurricane Dora dumped massive amounts of water on Live Oak, flooding major intersections and leaving the downtown area partially submerged. The damage led to the abandonment or tearing down of several historic buildings and the relocation of other businesses to higher ground.

In 1983, the Suwannee County Development Authority opened a park north of Live Oak along the banks of the Suwannee River. This park was little developed until being sold to private individuals in the 1990s. Renamed and developed as the Spirit of the Suwannee Music Park, it hosts music festivals for all types of music, drawing hundreds of thousands of visitors to the area annually.

=== 21st century ===
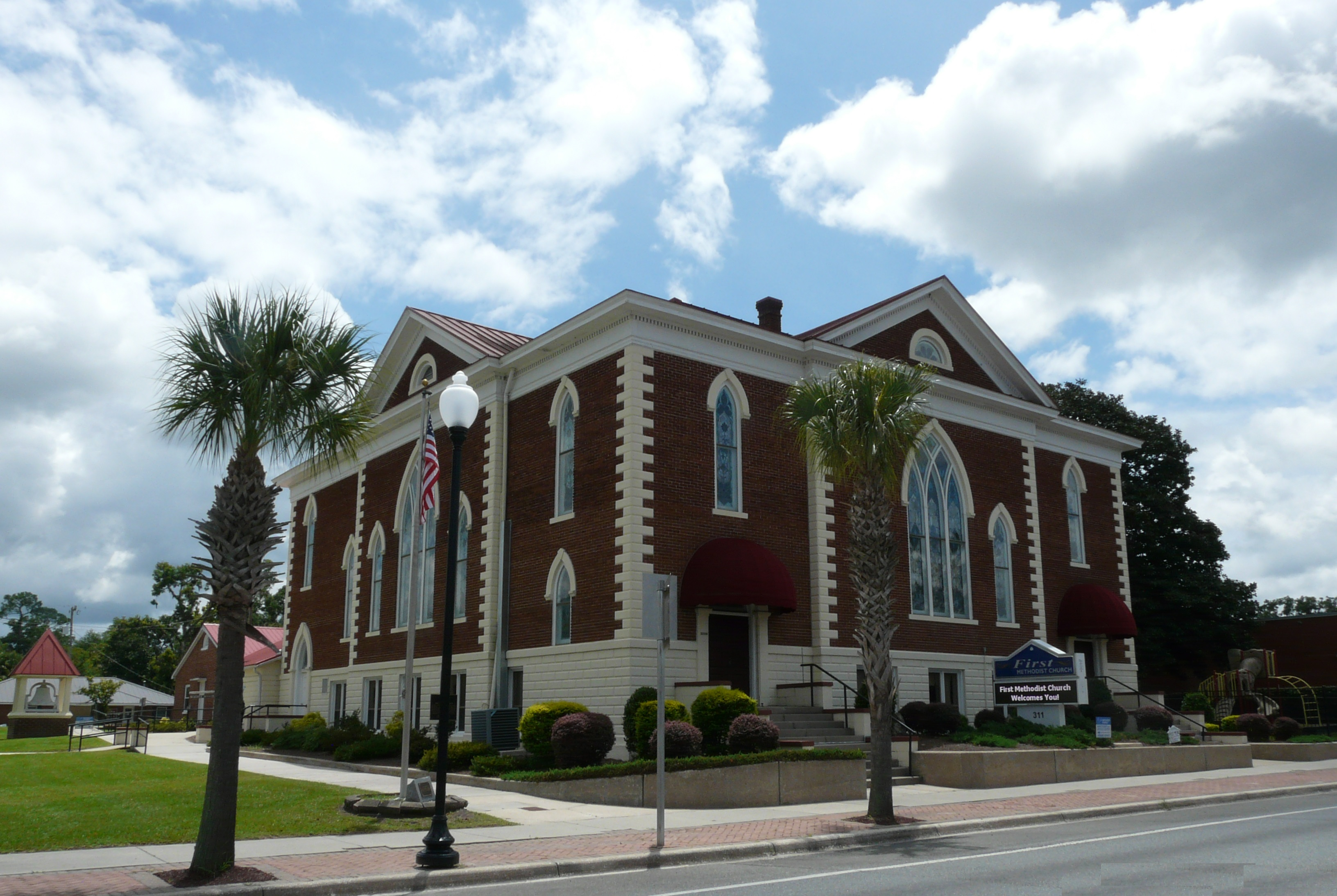
First Methodist Church on Ohio Avenue South

Tropical Storm Debby in 2012 surpassed the amount of rain brought by Hurricane Dora, and despite vastly improved drainage, much of Live Oak once again flooded. Interstates were shut down as portions were underwater, and much of the surrounding area was cut off from the outside world. In addition, dozens of sinkholes, some quite large, opened up all over the city and county, causing further damage. Several downtown buildings that were more than 100 years old were impacted and later torn down, replaced by public parks for community events.

Live Oak remains the largest community and only full-fledged city in Suwannee County. Eco-tourism in and around Live Oak brings thousands of people from all over the country to places such as the nearby Spirit of the Suwannee Music Park, the Suwannee River State Park, and numerous springs along the famed Suwannee River. In addition, agriculture-related business (including timber, pine straw, and watermelons) is still the dominant industry in Suwannee County, with international companies like Klausner Lumber making their home in and around Live Oak.

The passage of Hurricane Helene in 2024 greatly affected the city, with significant flooding and damage from high winds.

== Geography ==
Geographically, Suwannee County is situated on a limestone bed riddled with underground freshwater streams, which surface in dozens of beautiful springs. This phenomenon of "Karst topography" gives the area a local supply of renewable fresh water and abundant sources of fishing. The county is known as a world-class cave diving site for SCUBA enthusiasts, and underwater cave explorer Sheck Exley chose to live here in order to have close access to many of the springs.

Fishing sites include a number of small lakes about 5 miles east of the town. Suwannee Lake is the most well stocked and notable, but there is also Workman Lake, Dexter Lake, Campground Lake, Little Lake Hull, White Lake, Tiger Lake, Bachelor Lake, and Peacock Lake.

The Twin Rivers State Forest is a 14,882-acre (60 km^{2}) Florida State forest located in North Central Florida, near Live Oak.

== Climate ==
Live Oak has a humid subtropical climate (Cfa).

Climate data for Live Oak, Florida, 1991–2020 normals, extremes 1898–present
Month	Jan	Feb	Mar	Apr	May	Jun	Jul	Aug	Sep	Oct	Nov	Dec	Year
Record high °F (°C)	86 (30)	90 (32)	93 (34)	98 (37)	102 (39)	106 (41)	104 (40)	104 (40)	100 (38)	98 (37)	96 (36)	86 (30)	106 (41)
Mean maximum °F (°C)	80.6 (27.0)	83.5 (28.6)	86.8 (30.4)	90.5 (32.5)	95.7 (35.4)	98.3 (36.8)	98.4 (36.9)	97.5 (36.4)	95.2 (35.1)	90.7 (32.6)	85.8 (29.9)	81.9 (27.7)	100.0 (37.8)
Mean daily maximum °F (°C)	68.4 (20.2)	72.2 (22.3)	77.8 (25.4)	83.6 (28.7)	89.6 (32.0)	92.2 (33.4)	93.5 (34.2)	92.7 (33.7)	90.1 (32.3)	83.8 (28.8)	76.0 (24.4)	70.3 (21.3)	82.5 (28.1)
Daily mean °F (°C)	56.6 (13.7)	60.0 (15.6)	64.9 (18.3)	70.6 (21.4)	77.4 (25.2)	82.1 (27.8)	83.8 (28.8)	83.4 (28.6)	80.4 (26.9)	72.9 (22.7)	64.1 (17.8)	58.7 (14.8)	71.2 (21.8)
Mean daily minimum °F (°C)	44.7 (7.1)	47.7 (8.7)	52.0 (11.1)	57.5 (14.2)	65.1 (18.4)	72.0 (22.2)	74.1 (23.4)	74.2 (23.4)	70.8 (21.6)	62.0 (16.7)	52.2 (11.2)	47.1 (8.4)	60.0 (15.6)
Mean minimum °F (°C)	24.4 (−4.2)	27.6 (−2.4)	32.1 (0.1)	38.9 (3.8)	49.9 (9.9)	62.3 (16.8)	67.3 (19.6)	67.1 (19.5)	58.8 (14.9)	42.6 (5.9)	32.4 (0.2)	27.4 (−2.6)	22.5 (−5.3)
Record low °F (°C)	6 (−14)	5 (−15)	19 (−7)	31 (−1)	38 (3)	47 (8)	60 (16)	58 (14)	43 (6)	27 (−3)	15 (−9)	6 (−14)	5 (−15)
Average precipitation inches (mm)	4.82 (122)	3.50 (89)	5.01 (127)	3.50 (89)	2.62 (67)	6.78 (172)	6.39 (162)	5.59 (142)	4.99 (127)	4.04 (103)	2.11 (54)	2.54 (65)	51.89 (1,318)
Average precipitation days (≥ 0.01 in)	6.7	5.9	6.4	4.6	4.4	10.7	9.9	11.1	6.8	4.3	3.6	4.6	79.0
Source: NOAA

== Demographics ==
Historical population
Census	Pop.	Note	%±
1880	458		—
1890	687		50.0%
1900	1,659		141.5%
1910	3,450		108.0%
1920	3,103		−10.1%
1930	2,734		−11.9%
1940	3,427		25.3%
1950	4,064		18.6%
1960	6,544		61.0%
1970	6,830		4.4%
1980	6,732		−1.4%
1990	6,332		−5.9%
2000	6,480		2.3%
2010	6,850		5.7%
2020	6,735		−1.7%
U.S. Decennial Census

=== Racial and ethnic composition ===
Live Oak racial composition (Hispanics excluded from racial categories) (NH = Non-Hispanic)
Race	Pop 2010	Pop 2020	% 2010	% 2020
White (NH)	3,192	3,026	46.60%	44.93%
Black or African American (NH)	2,361	2,079	34.47%	30.87%
Native American or Alaska Native (NH)	15	26	0.22%	0.39%
Asian (NH)	67	97	0.98%	1.44%
Pacific Islander or Native Hawaiian (NH)	2	5	0.03%	0.07%
Some other race (NH)	1	33	0.01%	0.49%
Two or more races/Multiracial (NH)	103	253	1.50%	3.76%
Hispanic or Latino (any race)	1,109	1,216	16.19%	18.05%
Total	6,850	6,735	100.00%	100.00%

=== 2020 census ===
As of the 2020 census, Live Oak had a population of 6,735. The median age was 37.1 years. 26.8% of residents were under the age of 18 and 18.8% of residents were 65 years of age or older. For every 100 females, there were 91.0 males, and for every 100 females age 18 and over, there were 88.0 males age 18 and over.

93.1% of residents lived in urban areas, while 6.9% lived in rural areas.

There were 2,436 households in Live Oak, of which 36.8% had children under the age of 18 living in them. Of all households, 32.3% were married-couple households, 20.5% were households with a male householder and no spouse or partner present, and 39.6% were households with a female householder and no spouse or partner present. About 28.8% of all households were made up of individuals and 13.4% had someone living alone who was 65 years of age or older.

There were 2,793 housing units, of which 12.8% were vacant. The homeowner vacancy rate was 2.6% and the rental vacancy rate was 4.7%.

=== Demographic estimates ===
According to the 2020 ACS 5-year estimates, there were 1,401 families residing in the city.

The population density in 2020 was 882.8 inhabitants per square mile (340.9/km^{2}). There were 2.60 persons per household.

By age, the population in 2020 was split with 3.8% under 5 years old. 49.6% of the population were female persons.

In 2020, there was an owner-occupied housing unit rate of 48.2%. The median value of owner-occupied housing units was $104,400. The median selected monthly owner costs -with a mortgage was $1,121 and -without a mortgage was $374. The median gross rent was $773. 58.0% of households had a computer and 64.7% of households had a broadband internet subscription. The median household income was $45,417. There was a per capita income of $21,402. 26.2% of the population lived below the poverty threshold.

In 2020, 88.8% of the population 25 years and older were high school graduates or higher and 15.5% of that same population had a Bachelor's degree or higher.

=== 2010 census ===
As of the 2010 United States census, there were 6,850 people, 2,345 households, and 1,620 families residing in the city.

== Library ==
=== History ===
The City of Live Oak is the headquarters for the Suwannee River Regional Library System.

Live Oak had a small town library up until the 1940s, which was financed by the County with $25 a month. This first library was a small wooden structure located on the corner of Pine and Wilbur, originally used as the public restrooms for white women.

In 1948, a library annex was included in the building expansion program by the Board of County Commissioners. This building was made of brick and housed the public restroom for white women, a draft board office, and the library. The draft board office and library shared space and personnel until the Fall of 1954. In October 1954, half a million dollars was budgeted by the County Commissioners, and the City Council approved $500 annually for the operation of the Suwannee County Free Library.

The library opened on February 28, 1955, and had a collection of 3,100 books, some of which they borrowed from the State Library. Mrs. Sara Rogers became the first librarian after resigning her position as Chairman of the Woman’s Club Library Project Committee. Rogers resigned on April 6, 1956, to become postmistress, and was succeeded by Mrs. W.D. Richardson on March 15, 1957.

In an effort to receive federal funds, the Suwannee Board convinced Lafayette County to join in a regional library cooperative in 1957. In 1958, the first regional library system was established in Florida, servicing Lafayette and Suwannee counties.

By 1958, the library's collection had grown from 3,100 books to 10,000, and a bookmobile was established. In 1959, the regional library system grew to include seven different counties. On July 20, 1959, the Suwannee River Regional Library Board hosted the five incoming counties who all officially joined October 1, 1959. In 1960, the main library was located in Live Oak, with eight local units, consisting of over 23,500 books. The Miami Public Library gave 3,000 of those as a gift. The start of construction on the new Suwannee River Regional Library on Ohio Avenue South began on January 4, 1996, and the new building was dedicated on November 24, 1996. At that time, students included a time capsule to be opened on December 16, 2045, during Florida’s Bicentennial.

=== Awards ===
In April 1960, the Book-of the-Month Club awarded the Suwannee River Regional Library with the Dorothy Canfield Fisher Award. In the U.S., there were only eight rural libraries to qualify and receive the award, and the Suwannee River Regional Library was the only one from the south to be nominated and win the $1,000 prize.

On April 7, 1992, the Suwannee County Commission signed a resolution honoring the people responsible for the library’s thirty-five years of operation.

In 2009, the Suwannee River Regional Library was one of two-hundred and eight nationwide institutions to win a Big Read grant and The Maltese Falcon was chosen as the book to highlight. The library hosted a 1930s themed kick-off party on February 5, 2009 that turned into a monthlong "whodunit" when the model display Maltese Falcon was disappeared during festivities. The library used the grant to start a tween book club and created programs for middle and high school students including podcasts, art projects, and a film noir marathon. The library distributed three-hundred copies of The Maltese Falcon to the community with additional copies going to the high school and eleven life-size cut-outs of Humphrey Bogart as Sam Spade were distributed throughout town to garner interest.

== Education ==
The Suwannee County School District includes the Suwannee High School.

== Media ==
WFXU (channel 57) is licensed to Live Oak and serves the Tallahassee, Florida–Thomasville, Georgia market as an independent television station; it has a secondary affiliation with MyNetworkTV.

== Notable people ==
- Emma E. booker Andra Davis, former NFL player
- Cary A. Hardee, 23rd governor of Florida
- Trysten Hill, NFL player
- Kelly Jennings, former NFL player
- J. B. Johnson, 23rd Florida Attorney General, 28th President of the Florida Senate and former Judge.
- Bruce Johnson, former NFL player
- Joe Lang Kershaw, first African-American legislator in the state of Florida since the reconstruction era.
- Ruby McCollum, was a wealthy married African-American woman and known for being charged in 1952 for first-degree murder for killing Dr. C. Leroy Adams, a prominent white doctor and state senator–elect.
- Dale McCullers, former NFL player
- Jimmy Nelson, former NFL player
- Titus O'Neil, professional wrestler and former arena football player. Recipient of the WWE Hall of Fame 2020 Warrior Award.
- Vernon Peeples, politician and state legislator.
- Fain Skinner, former NASCAR driver
- Del Williams, former NFL player
