= National Register of Historic Places listings in Citrus County, Florida =

Location of Citrus County in Florida

This is a list of the National Register of Historic Places listings in Citrus County, Florida.

This is intended to be a complete list of the properties and districts on the National Register of Historic Places in Citrus County, Florida, United States. The locations of National Register properties and districts for which the latitude and longitude coordinates are included below, may be seen in a map.

There are 10 properties and districts listed on the National Register in the county, including 1 National Historic Landmark.

This National Park Service list is complete through NPS recent listings posted November 13, 2025.

Contents: Counties in Florida (non-linked contain no National Register listings)
Alachua - Baker - Bay - Bradford - Brevard - Broward - Calhoun - Charlotte - Citrus - Clay - Collier - Columbia - DeSoto - Dixie - Duval - Escambia - Flagler - Franklin - Gadsden - Gilchrist - Glades - Gulf - Hamilton - Hardee - Hendry - Hernando - Highlands - Hillsborough (Tampa) - Holmes - Indian River - Jackson - Jefferson - Lafayette - Lake - Lee - Leon - Levy - Liberty - Madison - Manatee - Marion - Martin - Miami-Dade (Miami) - Monroe - Nassau - Okaloosa - Okeechobee - Orange - Osceola - Palm Beach - Pasco - Pinellas - Polk - Putnam - St. Johns - St. Lucie - Santa Rosa - Sarasota - Seminole - Sumter - Suwannee - Taylor - Union - Volusia - Wakulla - Walton - Washington

== Current listings ==
	Name on the Register	Image	Date listed	Location	City or town	Description
1	Crystal River Indian Mounds	Crystal River Indian Mounds	September 29, 1970 (#70000178)	2 miles northwest of Crystal River on U.S. Routes 19/98; 28°55′01″N 82°36′33″W	Crystal River	61-acre State Park and National Historic Landmark that contains Native American burial mounds, temple/platform mounds, a plaza and a midden.
2	Crystal River Old City Hall	Crystal River Old City Hall	May 29, 1998 (#98000588)	532 North Citrus Avenue; 28°53′55″N 82°35′36″W	Crystal River	Built 1939; designed by the Works Progress Administration in the Mission/Spanish Revival style. Now the Coastal Heritage Museum.
3	Etna Turpentine Camp Archeological Site		December 10, 2009 (#09001055)	Address Restricted	Inverness vicinity	Abandoned turpentine camp from early 20th century.
4	Floral City Historic District	Floral City Historic District	December 1, 1993 (#93001357)	Roughly Orange Avenue from South Old Floral City Road to South Annie Terrace and South Aroostook Way from Orange to Lake Tsala Apopka; 28°45′02″N 82°17′27″W	Floral City	Historic district with 26 historic buildings.
5	Fort Cooper	Fort Cooper	June 13, 1972 (#72000304)	Address Restricted; 28°48′36″N 82°18′19″W	Inverness	710-acre historic site and state park.
6	Masonic Temple of Citrus Lodge No. 18, F. and A.M.	Masonic Temple of Citrus Lodge No. 18, F. and A.M.	June 23, 2010 (#10000387)	111 West Main St; 28°50′09″N 82°19′53″W	Inverness	1910 commercial building and former Masonic lodge.
7	Mullet Key	Mullet Key	July 3, 1986 (#86001409)	In Crystal Bay, within Crystal River Preserve State Park; 28°52′52″N 82°41′32″W	Crystal River	Island south of the main mouth of the Crystal River.
8	Old Citrus County Courthouse	Old Citrus County Courthouse	April 17, 1992 (#92000340)	1 Courthouse Square; 28°50′08″N 82°19′49″W	Inverness	Government building built in 1912. Now the site of the Old Courthouse Heritage Museum.
9	Old Hernando Elementary School	Old Hernando Elementary School	May 4, 2001 (#00001129)	2435 North Florida Avenue; 28°53′53″N 82°22′22″W	Hernando	School built in 1941-42.
10	Yulee Sugar Mill Ruins	Yulee Sugar Mill Ruins	August 12, 1970 (#70000179)	State Road 490 west of U.S. Route 19; 28°47′01″N 82°36′28″W	Homosassa	Ruins of forced-labor farm.

== See also ==
- List of National Historic Landmarks in Florida
- National Register of Historic Places listings in Florida
