= Beatlemania =

Fan frenzy for the British band the Beatles

Beatlemania was the fanaticism surrounding the English rock band the Beatles from 1963 to 1966. The group's popularity grew in the United Kingdom in late 1963, propelled by the singles "Please Please Me", "From Me to You" and "She Loves You". By October, the British press adopted the term "Beatlemania" to describe the scenes of adulation that attended the band's concert performances. Their world tours were characterised by the same levels of hysteria and high-pitched screaming by female fans, both at concerts and during the group's travels between venues.

In February 1964, the Beatles' televised performances on The Ed Sullivan Show were viewed by approximately 73 million people; the band soon held both the number one and number two spots on the Billboard Hot 100, with "I Want to Hold Your Hand" and "She Loves You", respectively. Their instant popularity in the United States and their unprecedented domination of the national sales charts was mirrored in numerous other countries. Their August 1965 concert at New York's Shea Stadium marked the first time that a large outdoor stadium was used for such a purpose, and with an audience of 55,000, set records for attendance and revenue generation. To protect themselves from their fans, the members typically travelled to these concerts by armoured car. From the end of that year, the band embraced promo clips for their singles to avoid the difficulties of making personal appearances on television programmes. Their December 1965 album Rubber Soul marked a profound change in the dynamic between fans and artists, as many Beatles fans sought to appreciate the progressive quality in the band's look, lyrics and sound.

Commentators likened the intensity of this adulation to a religious fervour and to a female masturbation fantasy. Among the displays of deity-like worship, fans would approach the band in the belief that they possessed supernatural healing powers. In 1966, John Lennon controversially remarked that the group had become "more popular than Jesus". Soon afterwards, when the Beatles toured Japan, the Philippines and the US, they were entangled in mob revolt, violence, political backlash and threats of assassination. Frustrated by the restrictions of Beatlemania and unable to hear themselves play above their fans' screams, the group stopped touring and became a studio-only band. Their popularity and influence expanded in various social and political arenas, while Beatlemania continued on a reduced scale from then and into the members' solo careers.

Beatlemania surpassed any previous examples of fan worship in its intensity and scope. Initially, the fans were predominantly young adolescent females, sometimes called "teenyboppers", and their behaviour was scorned by many commentators. By 1965, their fanbase included listeners who traditionally shunned youth-driven pop culture, which helped bridge divisions between folk and rock enthusiasts. During the 1960s, Beatlemania was the subject of analysis by psychologists and sociologists; a 1997 study recognised the phenomenon as an early proto-feminist demonstration of girl power.

== Interpretations and precursors ==
In the description of author and musician Bob Stanley, the band's domestic breakthrough represented a "final liberation" for the nation's teenagers and, by coinciding with the end of National Service, the group "effectively signaled the end of World War II in Britain".

During the 1840s, fans of Hungarian pianist and composer Franz Liszt showed a level of fanaticism similar to that of the Beatles. Poet Heinrich Heine coined "Lisztomania" to describe this. Once it became an international phenomenon in 1964, Beatlemania surpassed in intensity and reach any previous examples of fan worship, including those afforded to Rudy Vallée, Frank Sinatra, and Elvis Presley. One factor in this development may have been the post-World War II baby boom, which gave the Beatles a larger audience of young fans than Sinatra and Presley had a decade earlier.

Psychologists during the 1960s were especially drawn to the significance of the long hair preferred by the Beatles and the bands that emerged soon after their breakthrough. Academics proposed that the long hair signalled androgyny and thus presented a less threatening version of male sexuality to teenage girls, as well as allowing male fans to view the group in a sexual regard that they normally reserved for young females. Other concerns related to the Beatles' own sexuality; whether the haircuts were a projection of latent homosexuality or confident heterosexuality. In their 1986 book Re-making Love: The Feminization of Sex, authors Barbara Ehrenreich, Elizabeth Hess and Gloria Jacobs argued that the band's presentable suits meant that they seemed less "sleazy" than Presley to middle-class whites.

In February 1964, Paul Johnson wrote an article in the New Statesman which stated that the mania was a modern incarnation of female hysteria and that the wild fans at the Beatles' concerts were "the least fortunate of their generation, the dull, the idle, the failures". The article became the "most complained-about piece" in the magazine's history. A 1966 study published in the British Journal of Clinical Psychology rejected Johnson's assertion; the researchers found that Beatles fans were not likelier to score higher on Minnesota Multiphasic Personality Inventory's hysteria scale, nor were they unusually neurotic. Instead, they described Beatlemania as "the passing reaction of predominantly young adolescent females to group pressures of such a kind that meet their special emotional needs".

== 1963: UK success ==
=== "Please Please Me" and first UK tours ===
The Beatles attracted a fan frenzy in the north of England since the start of the 1960s. Beatles historian Mark Lewisohn says that some who attended the band's 27 December 1960 show in Litherland claim that Beatlemania was "born" there, while Bob Wooler, who regularly presented the Beatles at Liverpool's Cavern Club, wrote in August 1961 that they were "the stuff that screams are made of" and were already playing to "fever-pitch audiences" at the Cavern. However, national recognition of "Beatlemania" eluded the band until late 1963.

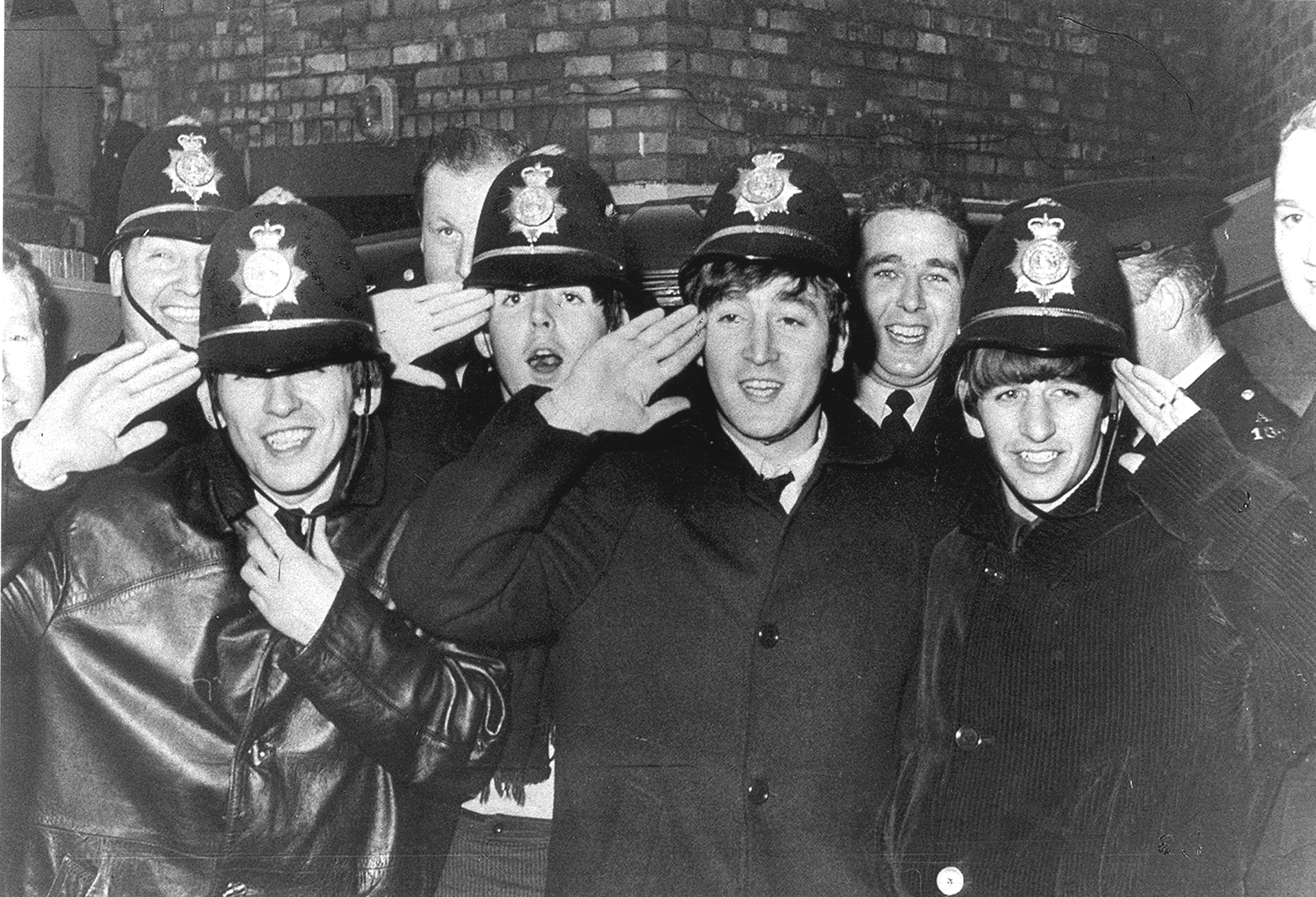
The Beatles outside the Birmingham Hippodrome, November 1963. Because the crowds were so thick, they had to be smuggled into the venue with assistance from local police.

With the success of their second single "Please Please Me", the Beatles found themselves in demand for the whole of 1963. In the UK, the song reached number two on the Record Retailer chart (subsequently adopted as the UK Singles Chart), and topped both the NME and Melody Maker charts. The band released their first album in March 1963, also titled Please Please Me. They completed four nationwide tours and performed at a great many single shows around the UK throughout the year, often finishing one show only to travel straight to the next show in another location – sometimes even to perform again the same day. The music papers were full of stories about the Beatles, and magazines for teenage girls regularly contained interviews with the band members, colour posters, and other Beatle-related articles. Lennon's August 1962 marriage to Cynthia Powell was kept from public view as a closely guarded secret. (Note: Lennon's son Julian was born on 8 April 1963. Lennon visited the hospital to see his wife and meet his new son for the first time, but he attempted to disguise himself to prevent people in the hospital from recognising him.)

On 2 February 1963, the Beatles opened their first nationwide tour at a show in Bradford featuring Helen Shapiro, Danny Williams, Kenny Lynch, Kestrels, and the Red Price Orchestra. Heading the tour bill was 16-year-old Shapiro followed by the other five acts – the last of which was the Beatles. The band proved immensely popular during the tour, however, as journalist Gordon Sampson observed. His report did not use the word "Beatlemania", but the phenomenon was evident. Sampson wrote that "a great reception went to the colourfully dressed Beatles, who almost stole the show, for the audience repeatedly called for them while other artists were performing!" The Beatles' second nationwide tour began on 9 March at the Granada Cinema in London, where the group appeared on a bill headed by American stars Tommy Roe and Chris Montez, both of whom had firmly established themselves in the UK singles charts. Throughout the tour, the crowds repeatedly screamed for the Beatles, and the American stars were less popular than a homegrown act for the first time. The Beatles enjoyed the overwhelming enthusiasm, but they also felt embarrassment for the American performers at this unexpected turn of events, which persisted at every show on the tour.

In May, the Beatles achieved their first number 1 single on the Record Retailer chart with "From Me to You". McCartney later cited the song title, along with that of its B-side, "Thank You Girl", as an example of him and Lennon directly addressing the group's fans and appreciating that such a seemingly personal message resonated with their audience. According to Stanley, the band provided a sense of liberation for fans of both sexes, in that "The boys could make as much noise as possible; the girls had something with dirt under its fingernails they could scream at."

The Beatles began their third nationwide tour on 18 May, the bill this time headed by Roy Orbison. Orbison had established even greater UK chart success than either Montez or Roe, with four hits in the top 10, but he proved less popular than the Beatles at the tour's opening show staged at the Adelphi Cinema, Slough. It soon became obvious that this was not going to change, and a week into the tour the covers of the souvenir programs were reprinted to place the Beatles above Orbison. Starr was nonetheless impressed with the response that Orbison still commanded, saying: "We would be backstage, listening to the tremendous applause he was getting. He was just doing it by his voice. Just standing there singing, not moving or anything." The tour lasted three weeks and ended on 9 June.

=== "She Loves You" and coinage of "Beatlemania" ===
"She Loves You" (1963)
Beatles historian Mark Lewisohn says that while Beatlemania was "cooking in the summer of 1963", the release of "She Loves You" "brought it to the boil". He highlights the falsetto cries of "Ooh!" and the "yeah, yeah, yeah" refrain as elements that ensured the song became an anthem for British teenagers.

There was tremendous anticipation ahead of the release of the Beatles' fourth single, "She Loves You". Thousands of fans ordered the single as early as June 1963, well before its title had been known. In July, the band convened at EMI Studios for the song's recording session, an occasion that was publicised in advance by the weekly pop papers. More than a hundred fans congregated outside the studios, and dozens broke through a police blockade, swarming the building in search of the band. By the day before the single went on sale in August, some 500,000 advanced orders had been placed for it. "She Loves You" topped the charts and set several UK sales records. The song included a "Yeah, yeah, yeah" refrain that became a signature hook for their European audiences; in addition, the song's falsetto "Ooh!"s elicited further fan delirium when accompanied by the vocalists' exaggerated shaking of their moptop hair.

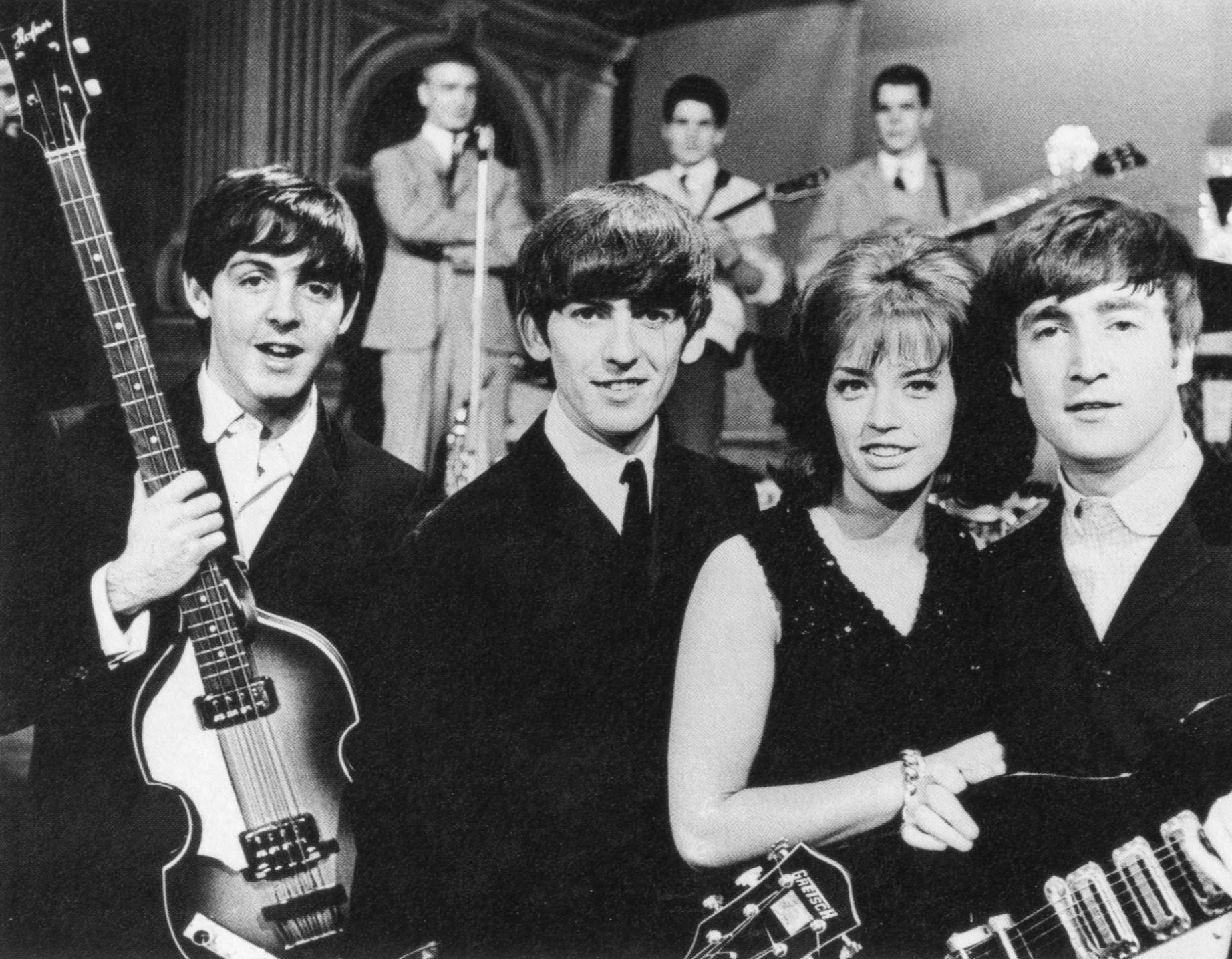
McCartney, Harrison, Swedish pop singer Lill-Babs, and Lennon on the set of the Swedish television show Drop-In, 30 October 1963

On 13 October, the Beatles starred on Val Parnell's Sunday Night at the London Palladium, the UK's top variety show. Their performance was televised live and watched by 15 million viewers. One national paper's headlines in the following days coined the term "Beatlemania" to describe the phenomenal and increasingly hysterical interest in the Beatles – and it stuck. Publicist Tony Barrow saw Beatlemania as beginning with the band's appearance on that program, at which point he no longer had to contact the press but had the press contacting him. Scottish music promoter Andi Lothian said that he coined "Beatlemania" while speaking to a reporter at the band's Caird Hall concert, which took place as part of the Beatles' mini-tour of Scotland on 7 October. The word appeared in the Daily Mail on 21 October for a feature story by Vincent Mulchrone headlined "This Beatlemania".

On 23 October 1963, the band flew from London to Stockholm for a seven-day concert tour to five cities in Sweden; their very first international tour as a famous group. When they returned to London Airport on 31 October, they were greeted in heavy rain by 10,000 screaming fans, 50 journalists and photographers, and a BBC TV camera crew. The wild scenes at the airport delayed the British Prime Minister Alec Douglas-Home, being chauffeured in the vicinity, as his car was obstructed by the crowds. The Miss World at the time was passing through the airport as well, but she was completely ignored by journalists and the public. Ed Sullivan was also among those held up at the airport. He was told the reason for the delay and responded: "Who the hell are the Beatles?"

=== Autumn UK tour and Christmas shows ===
An admirer from their pre-fame days in Liverpool was shocked to witness a Beatles performance in 1963, at which every note of their music was buried beneath the screams of young girls. Why didn't they listen to their idols? she asked. "We came to see the Beatles", a fan replied. "We can hear them on records. Anyway, we might be disappointed if we heard them in real life."

— Author Peter Doggett

On 1 November, the Beatles began their 1963 Autumn Tour, their first tour as undisputed headliners. It produced much the same reaction from those attending, with a fervent, riotous response from fans everywhere they went. Police attempting to control the crowds employed high-pressure water hoses, and the safety of the police became a matter of national concern, provoking controversial discussions in Parliament over the thousands of police officers putting themselves at risk to protect the Beatles.

On the first tour date, at the Odeon in Cheltenham, the volume of sound from the screaming crowds was so great that the Beatles' amplification equipment proved unequal to it – the band members could not hear themselves speaking, singing or playing. The next day, the Daily Mirror carried the headline "BEATLEMANIA! It's happening everywhere ... even in sedate Cheltenham". The Daily Telegraph published a disapproving article in which Beatlemania and the scenes of adulation were likened to Hitler's Nuremberg Rallies. Adults, who had been accustomed to wartime deprivation in their youth, expressed concerns at the frenzied reaction given to pop groups such as the Beatles. Alternatively, a Church of England clergyman remarked that a Beatles version of the Christmas carol "O Come, All Ye Faithful", sung as "O Come, All Ye Faithful Yeah Yeah Yeah", might restore the popularity and relevance of the church in Britain.

The tour continued until 13 December, with stops in Dublin and Belfast, and marked the "pinnacle of British Beatlemania", according to Lewisohn. (Note: On 4 November, the Beatles sang before the Queen Mother and Princess Margaret at the Royal Variety Performance, sharing the large bill with non-pop acts including Marlene Dietrich and Harry Secombe.) Maureen Lipman attended a concert in Hull as a sceptic, but 50 years later she recalled her "road to Damascus moment" when Lennon sang "Money (That's What I Want)": "Someone very close to me screamed the most piercing of screams, a primal mating call … I realised with an electric shock that the screaming someone was me." Lipman heard that the theatre "cleared away 40 pairs of abandoned knickers" from other young female fans, and she concluded, "life, as I knew it, was never the same again."

On 21 and 22 December, the band gave preview performances of The Beatles' Christmas Show in Bradford and Liverpool, respectively. Designed for the group's fans and performed with several other acts, the presentation combined comedy with musical sets and was subsequently performed twice daily (apart from on New Year's Eve) at the Finsbury Park Astoria in north London from 24 December to 11 January 1964. (Note: Chris Charlesworth, subsequently a Melody Maker journalist, recalled of the Bradford show: "There were very few boys in the audience ... I couldn't hear a note they sang or played [above the girls' screams] ... but it was the most exciting thing I'd ever seen in my life – an unbelievable experience. The next day all I could think about was getting a guitar.") The Beatles also recorded the first of their annual fan club Christmas records, an initiative suggested by Barrow, which again included comedy skits and musical segments. With the November 1963 release of their second album, With the Beatles, the group inaugurated a tradition of issuing a new Beatles LP in time for the Christmas sell-in period, leading fans to congregate and hold listening parties over the holiday season. Author Nicholas Schaffner, a teenager during the 1960s, said that these albums came to "evoke an intangible sense of Christmas" for many listeners as a result.

== 1964–1965: International success ==
=== American breakthrough and "I Want to Hold Your Hand" ===
EMI owned Capitol Records, but Capitol had declined to issue any of the band's singles in the US for most of the year. The American press regarded the phenomenon of Beatlemania in the UK with amusement. Newspaper and magazine articles about the Beatles began to appear in the US towards the end of 1963, and they cited the English stereotype of eccentricity, reporting that the UK had finally developed an interest in rock and roll, which had come and gone a long time previously in the US. Headlines included "The New Madness" and "Beatle Bug Bites Britain", and writers employed word-play linking "beetle" with the "infestation" afflicting the UK. The Baltimore Sun reflected the dismissive view of most adults: "America had better take thought as to how it will deal with the invasion. Indeed a restrained 'Beatles go home' might be just the thing." Rather than dissuading American teenagers, such disapproval from adults strengthened their connection with the band.

The Beatles' American television debut was on 18 November 1963 on The Huntley–Brinkley Report, with a four-minute report by Edwin Newman. On 22 November, the CBS Morning News ran a five-minute feature on Beatlemania in the UK which heavily featured their UK hit "She Loves You". The evening's scheduled repeat was cancelled following the assassination of President John F. Kennedy the same day. On 10 December, Walter Cronkite decided to run the piece on the CBS Evening News.

American chart success began after disc jockey Carroll James obtained a copy of the British single "I Want to Hold Your Hand" in mid-December and began playing it on AM radio station WWDC in Washington, DC. Listeners repeatedly phoned in to request a replay of the song, while local record shops were flooded with requests for a record that they did not have in stock. James sent the record to other disc jockeys around the country, sparking similar reaction. On 26 December, Capitol released the record three weeks ahead of schedule. It sold a million copies and became a number-one hit in the US by mid-January. Epstein arranged for a $40,000 American marketing campaign, a deal Capitol accepted due to Ed Sullivan's agreement to headline the Beatles on The Ed Sullivan Show.

=== First visit to the United States and Ed Sullivan Show performances ===
In advance of the Beatles' arrival in the United States, Time magazine reported that the "raucous sound" of the band's screaming fans made their concerts "slightly orgiastic". The seating at venues would be soaked in urine after each show and, in Doggett's description, "Sociologists noted that witnessing a pop group provoked orgasms amongst girls too young to understand what they were feeling." David Holbrook wrote in the New Statesman that it was "painfully clear that the Beatles are a masturbation fantasy, such as a girl presumably has during the onanistic act – the genial smiling young male images, the music like a buzzing of the blood in the head, the rhythm, the cries, the shouted names, the climaxes."

On 3 January 1964, The Jack Paar Program ran Beatles concert footage licensed from the BBC "as a joke" to an audience of 30 million viewers. On 7 February, an estimated 4,000 Beatles fans were present as Pan Am Flight 101 left Heathrow Airport. Among the passengers were the Beatles on their first trip to the US as a band, along with Phil Spector and an entourage of photographers and journalists. On arrival at New York's newly renamed John F. Kennedy International Airport, they were greeted by a crowd of 4,000 Beatles fans and 200 journalists. A few people in the crowd were injured, and the airport had not previously experienced such a large crowd. The band held a press conference where they met disc jockey Murray the K, then they were driven to New York City, each in a separate limousine. On the way, McCartney turned on a radio and listened to a running commentary: "They have just left the airport and are coming to New York City." When they reached the Plaza Hotel, they were besieged by fans and reporters. Author André Millard, writing in his book Beatlemania: Technology, Business, and Teen Culture in Cold War America, says that it was this constant fan presence – outside the band's hotels, UK residences, and recording studios – that gave Beatlemania an "extra dimension that lifted it above all other incidents of fan worship".

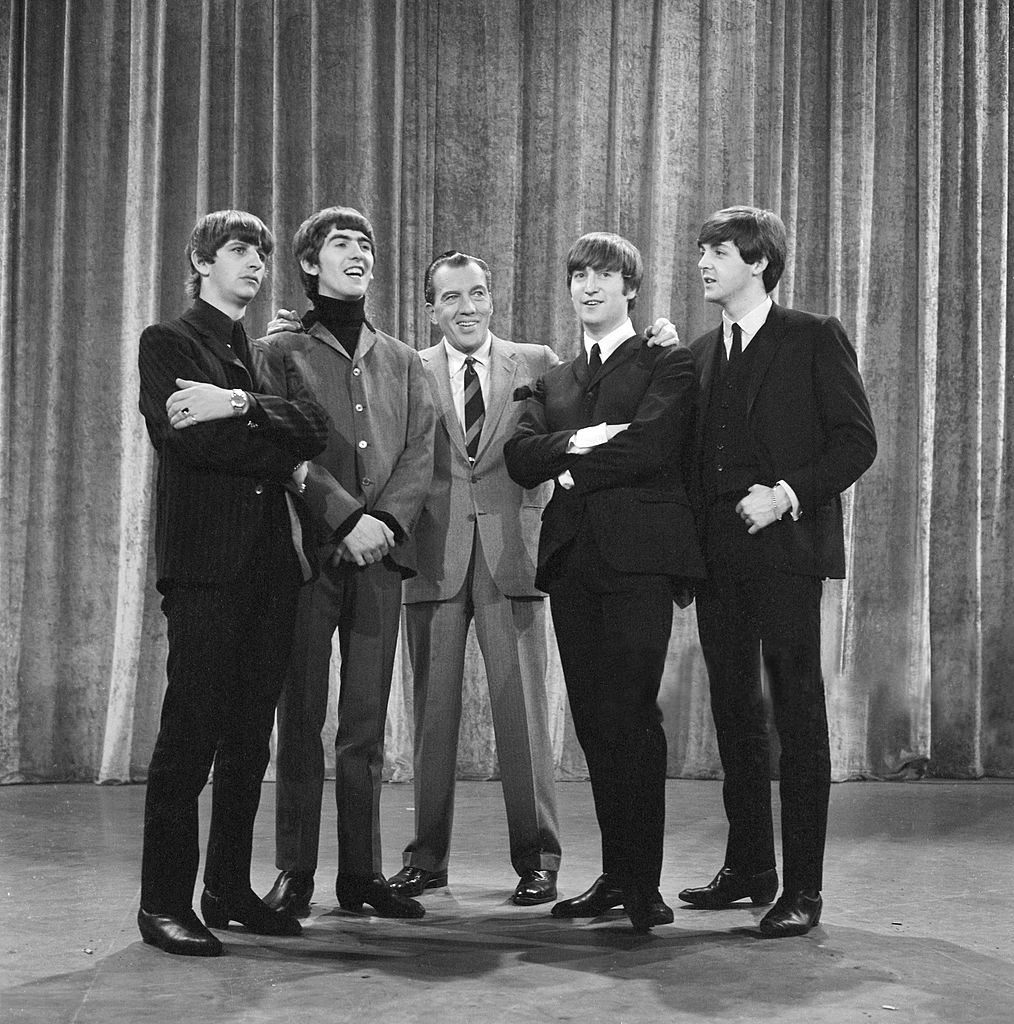
The Beatles with Ed Sullivan, February 1964

The Beatles made their first live American television appearance on 9 February, when 73 million viewers watched them perform on The Ed Sullivan Show at 8 pm – about two-fifths of the American population. According to the Nielsen ratings audience measurement system, the show had the largest number of viewers that had been recorded for an American television program. The Beatles performed their first American concert on 11 February at Washington Coliseum, a sports arena in Washington, DC, attended by 8,000. They performed a second concert the next day at New York's Carnegie Hall, which was attended by 2,000, and both concerts were well received. The Beatles then flew to Miami Beach and made their second television appearance on The Ed Sullivan Show on 16 February, which was broadcast live from the Napoleon Ballroom of the Deauville Hotel in Miami Beach with another 70 million viewers. On 22 February, the Beatles returned to the UK and arrived at Heathrow airport at 7 am, where they were met by an estimated 10,000 fans.

An article in The New York Times Magazine described Beatlemania as a "religion of teenage culture" that was indicative of how American youth now looked to their own age group for social values and role models. The US had been in mourning, fear and disbelief over the assassination of President John F. Kennedy on 22 November 1963, and contemporary pundits identified a link between the public shock and the adulation afforded the Beatles eleven weeks later. According to these writers, the Beatles reignited the sense of excitement and possibility that had faded in the wake of the assassination. Other factors cited included the threat of nuclear war, racial tensions in the US, and reports of the country's increased involvement in the Vietnam War. (Note: Writing for Mojo in 2002, Lewisohn said that while some people dismiss the Kennedy association as "psychobabble", "it does make sense.")

The first Beatles album issued by Capitol, Meet the Beatles!, hit number one on the Billboard Top LPs chart (later the Billboard 200) on 15 February, and it maintained that position for 11 weeks of its 74-week chart stay. On 4 April, the group occupied the top five US single chart positions, as well as seven other positions in the Billboard Hot 100. As of 2025, they are one of only 3 acts to hold the top five, the others being Drake and Taylor Swift (three times). As of 2013, they had also broken 11 other chart records on the Hot 100 and the Billboard 200. Author David Szatmary states, "In the nine days, during the Beatles' brief visit, Americans had bought more than two million Beatles records and more than 2.5 million US dollars worth of Beatles-related goods." The Beatles' Second Album on Capitol topped the charts on 2 May and kept its peak for five weeks of its 55-week chart stay.

=== 1964 world tour ===
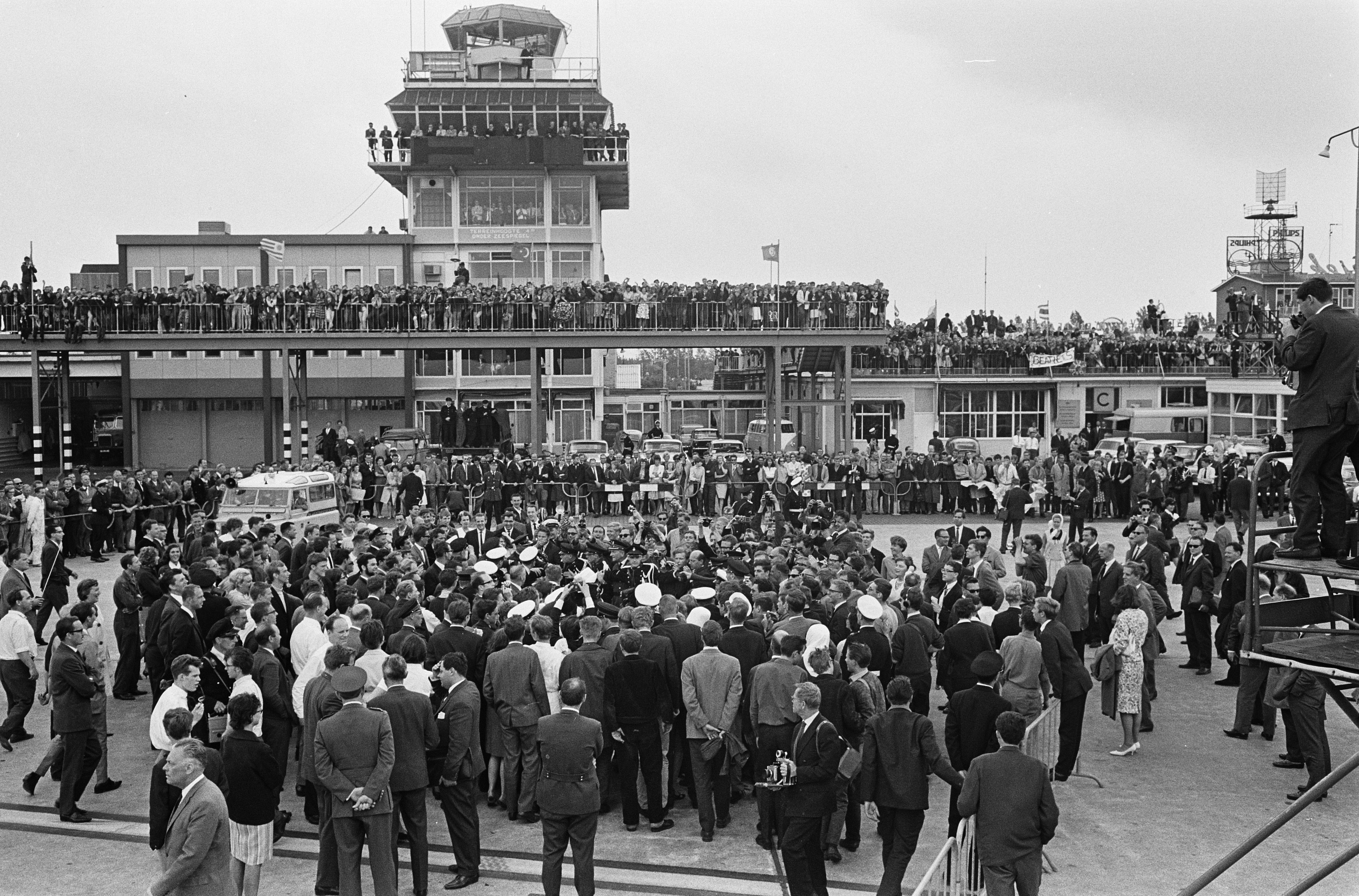
Members of the media swarm the Beatles at Amsterdam's Schiphol Airport in June 1964, as fans await them on top of the airport terminal.

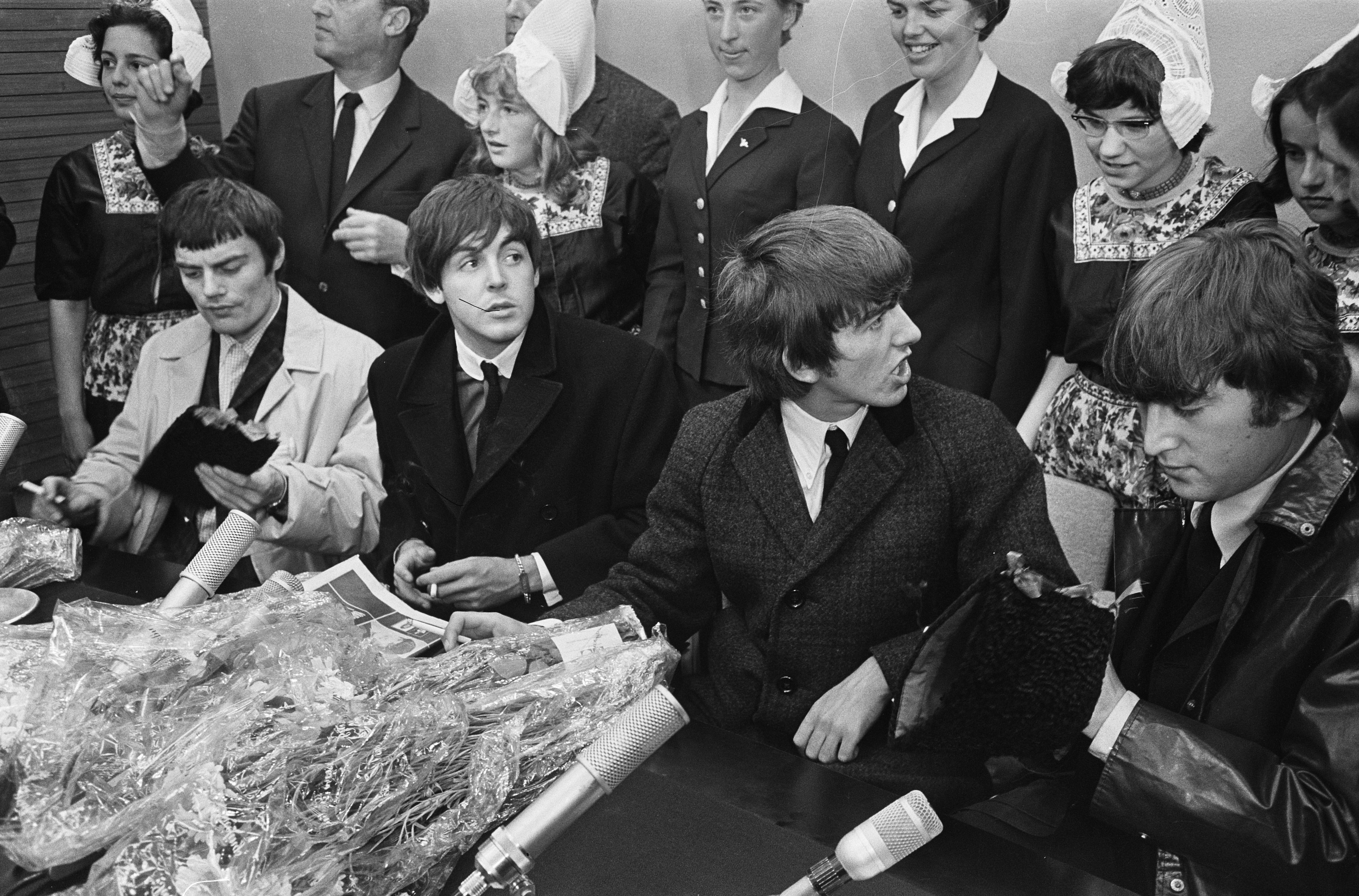
Holding a press conference in the Netherlands at the start of their first world tour, June 1964

The Beatles' success established the popularity of British musical acts for the first time in the US. By mid 1964, several more UK acts came to the US, including the Kinks, the Dave Clark Five, the Rolling Stones, the Animals, Billy J. Kramer, Herman's Hermits, Gerry & the Pacemakers, and Petula Clark. Completing what commentators termed the British Invasion of the US pop market, one-third of all top ten hits there in 1964 were performed by British acts. The Beatles' chart domination was repeated in countries around the world during 1964, as were the familiar displays of mania wherever the band played. Fans besieged their hotels, where sheets and pillowcases were stolen for souvenirs. As the phenomenon escalated over 1964–65, travelling to concert venues involved a journey via helicopter and armoured car. These arrangements came to resemble military operations, with decoy vehicles and a level of security normally afforded a head of state. (Note: One report said the group's travel plans were like those for a shipment of gold from Fort Knox.) Contrary to the presentable image the Beatles maintained for reporters covering the tours, their evening parties often descended into orgies with female admirers, which Lennon later likened to the scenes of Roman decadence in Frederico Fellini's film Satyricon.

When the group toured Australia in June, as part of their 1964 world tour, the population afforded the visit the status of a national event. Despite arriving in Sydney on 11 June amid heavy rain, the Beatles were paraded at the airport on an open-top truck. A woman ran across the airport tarmac and threw her intellectually disabled young child into the truck, shouting, "Catch him, Paul!" McCartney did so before telling her the boy was "lovely" and that she should take him back. Once the truck had slowed, the woman kissed her boy and declared: "He's better! Oh, he's better!" Starr later said that scenes of alleged miracle working by the Beatles were commonplace around the world, including in the UK. (Note: Lennon said it was especially common in the US, where nurses or mothers would bring blind children and "cripples" backstage in the belief that a Beatle's touch could cure them. The band took to signalling roadie Mal Evans with the words "Cripples, Mal!", which became a code for him to remove any visitors the Beatles did not wish to see.)

A crowd of 300,000 – roughly half the city – welcomed the Beatles to Adelaide on 12 June. This figure was the largest recorded gathering of Australians in one place, and twice the number of people that had greeted Queen Elizabeth II on her royal visit in 1963. They were given a similar welcome in Melbourne on 14 June. Fans lined the city streets and then lay siege outside the Beatles' hotel; cars were crushed and 50 people were hospitalised, some having fallen from trees in an attempt to gain a vantage point of their heroes. The Beatles were asked to make an appearance on their hotel balcony in the hope of placating the crowd. The mass of people and sound was reminiscent of film footage of 1930s Nuremberg rallies. According to author Keith Badman, this prompted Lennon to give a Nazi salute "and shout 'Sieg Heil!', even holding his finger to his upper lip as a Hitler-style moustache". (Note: During the group's years on the Hamburg club circuit, Lennon had taken to giving mock-Hitler tirades from the stage and baiting audiences with jokes about Germany's loss in World War II.) Lennon also took to giving crowds an open-palmed benediction in the style of the Pope.

During the first concert in Sydney, on 18 June, the audience's habit of hurling Jelly Babies at the stage – a legacy of Harrison saying earlier in the year that he liked Jelly Babies – forced the band to twice stop the show, with McCartney complaining that it was "like bullets coming from all directions". In addition to the sweets, fans threw miniature koalas and packages as gifts for the band. Hurling objects at the group became a fan ritual carried out wherever the Beatles performed.

The world tour moved on to New Zealand later in the month. There, the authorities expressed their disapproval of the Beatles and their fans' behaviour by refusing to supply a police escort and by allocating a maximum of three officers to control the thousands of screaming fans outside venues and hotels. In Auckland and Dunedin, the band were left to fight their way through crowds with the help of their road managers, Mal Evans and Neil Aspinall; Lennon was later vocal in his disgust with the local authorities. On 22 June, a young woman broke into the hotel in Wellington where the Beatles were staying, and slashed her wrists when Evans refused her access to the band's rooms. Following the Beatles' arrival in Christchurch on 27 June, a girl threw herself in front of the band's limousine and bounced off the car's bonnet. Unharmed, she was invited by the group to join them at their hotel.

=== A Hard Day's Night ===
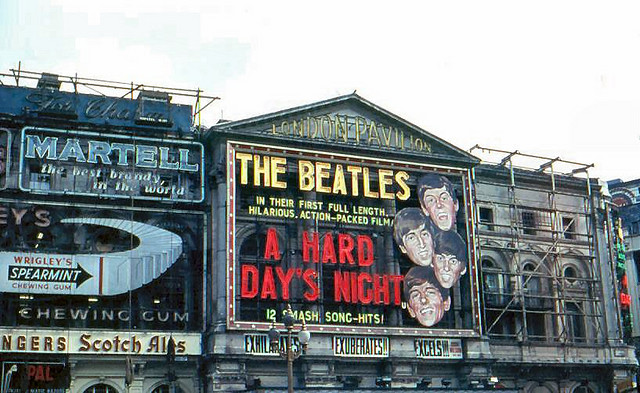
The London Pavilion showing A Hard Day's Night, August 1964

The Beatles starred as fictionalised versions of themselves in the feature-length motion picture A Hard Day's Night. Originally to be titled Beatlemania, it portrayed the members as struggling with the trappings of their fame and popularity. The making was complicated by the real-life Beatlemania that arose wherever the crew were shooting on a given day. Some reviewers felt that its concert scene, filmed at a London theatre with an audience of fans who were paid extras, had been deliberately sanitised in its depiction of Beatlemania.

A Hard Day's Night had its world premiere on 6 July, attended by members of the royal family; 12,000 fans filled Piccadilly Circus in central London, which had to be closed to traffic. A separate premiere was held for the north of England on 10 July, for which the Beatles returned to Liverpool. A crowd estimated at 200,000 (a quarter of the city's population) lined the streets as the band members were driven to Liverpool Town Hall to meet local dignitaries; once there, in Barry Miles' description, Lennon "enlivened proceedings by making a series of Hitler salutes to the crowd". (Note: According to Aspinall, a fellow Liverpudlian, Lennon's "Hitler bit on the balcony" was an example of his irreverent attitude in high-pressure situations. Aspinall recalled, "Nobody seemed to pick up on it.")

Stanley highlights the Hard Day's Night LP as the album that best demonstrates the band's international appeal, saying: "There was adventure, knowingness, love, and abundant charm [in the songs] ... the drug was adrenaline. The world loved them, and the world was their plaything." The album spent 14 weeks at number one on the Billboard Top LPs chart during a 56-week stay – the longest run of any album that year. In the UK, it was number one for 21 weeks and became the second best selling album of the year, behind the group's December 1964 release, Beatles for Sale, which replaced it at the top of the chart.

=== First American tour ===
I went absolutely mad round about 1964. My head was just so swollen. I thought I was a God, a living God. And the other three looked at me and said, Excuse me, I am the God. We all went through a period of going mad.

— Ringo Starr

The band returned to the US for a second visit on 18 August 1964, this time remaining for a month-long tour. The Beatles performed 30 concerts in 23 cities, starting in California and ending in New York. One of the major stipulations was that the band would not perform for segregated audiences or at venues which excluded Black people. The tour was characterised by intense levels of hysteria and high-pitched screaming by female fans, both at concerts and during their travels. At each venue, the concert was treated as a major event by the local press and attended by 10,000 to 20,000 fans whose enthusiastic response produced sound levels that left the music only semi-audible.

George Martin, the Beatles' record producer, assisted in taping the band's 23 August Hollywood Bowl concert for a proposed live album; given the audience's relentless screaming, he said it was "like putting a microphone at the end of a 747 jet". When the Beatles played in Chicago on 5 September, a local policeman described the adulation as "kind of like Sinatra multiplied by 50 or 100". Variety reported that 160 females were treated for injuries and distress in Vancouver, after thousands of fans charged at the security barriers in front of the stage. At Jacksonville on 11 September 500 fans kept the Beatles trapped in the George Washington Hotel car park after the group had given a press conference at the hotel. With only a dozen police officers on hand, it took the band 15 minutes to move the 25 feet from the lift to their limousine. Harrison refused to take part in the scheduled ticker-tape parades, given Kennedy's assassination the previous year. He said that the constant demand on their time, from fans, city officials, hotel management and others, was such that the band often locked themselves in their hotel bathroom to gain some peace.

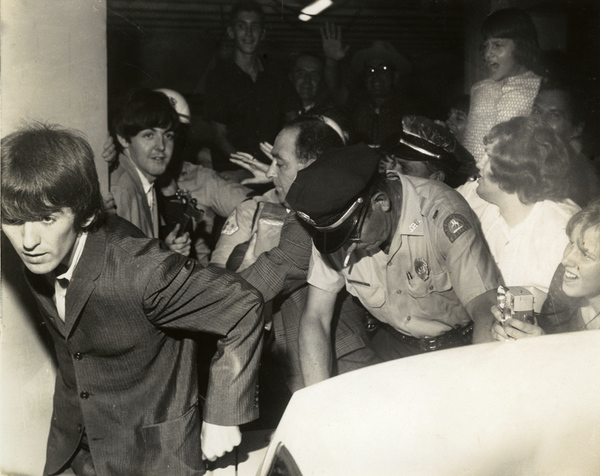
Police escort Harrison and McCartney through fans gathered at the George Washington Hotel in Jacksonville, Florida, September 1964.

The tour earned the group over a million dollars in ticket sales, and stimulated a further increase in record and Beatles-related merchandise sales. Robert Shelton of The New York Times criticised the Beatles for "creat[ing] a monster in their audience" and said that the band should try to subdue their fans "before this contrived hysteria reaches uncontrollable proportions". Reports at this time likened the intensity of the fans' adulation to a religious fervour. Derek Taylor, the band's press officer, was quoted in the New York Post as saying, "Cripples threw away their sticks [and] sick people rushed up to the car ... It was as if some savior had arrived and all these people were happy and relieved." In a report from London for the Partisan Review, Jonathan Miller wrote of the effects of the Beatles' extended absence overseas: "They have become a religion in fact ... All over the place though there are icons, devotional photos and illuminated messiahs which keep the tiny earthbound fans in touch with the provocatively absconded deities." American social commentators Grace and Fred Hechinger complained that adults had failed to provide youth with an adequate foundation for their creativity, and they especially deplored the tendency for "creeping adult adolescence", whereby parents sought to share their children's "banal pleasures".

During the 1964 tour, the Beatles met Bob Dylan in their New York hotel. Lennon later enthused about the meeting; he said that Beatlemania was "something Dylan can understand and relate to" and recalled Dylan explaining the intensity of his following. In his book Can't Buy Me Love: The Beatles, Britain, and America, author Jonathan Gould comments on the musical and cultural significance of this meeting, since the Beatles' fanbase and that of Dylan were "perceived as inhabiting two separate subcultural worlds". (Note: Dylan recalled in 1971: "I just kept it to myself that I really dug them. Everybody else thought they were for the teenyboppers, that they were gonna pass right away. But it was obvious to me that they had staying power." During their first meeting, Dylan answered the constantly ringing telephone in the band's hotel suite, saying, "This is Beatlemania here.") As a result, according to Gould, the traditional division between folk and rock enthusiasts "nearly evaporated" over the following year, as the Beatles' fans began to mature in their outlook and Dylan's audience embraced the new, youth-driven pop culture.

Capitol Records exploited the band's popularity with a 48-minute documentary double LP The Beatles' Story, released in November 1964 and purporting to be a "narrative and musical biography of Beatlemania". It included a portion of "Twist and Shout" from the Hollywood Bowl concert and segments such as "How Beatlemania Began", "Beatlemania in Action" and "'Victims' of Beatlemania".

=== Shea Stadium and 1965 American tour ===
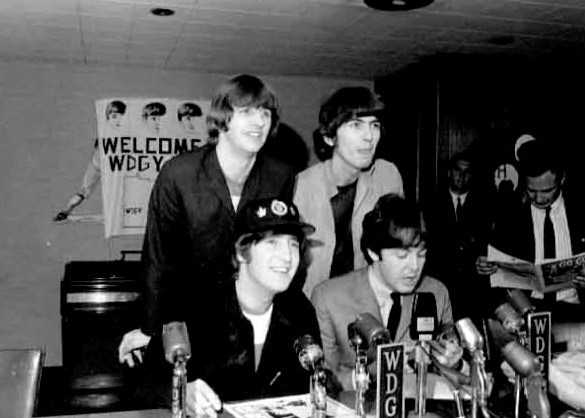
The Beatles at a press conference during their August 1965 North American tour

The Beatles attended the London premiere of their film Help! in July 1965, after completing a two-week tour of France, Italy and Spain, and then returned to the US for another two-week tour. In advance of the tour, the American cultural press published appreciations of the Beatles' music, marking a turnaround from the dismissiveness shown towards the band in 1964. Written by musicologists, these articles were informed by the media's realisation that, rather than a short-term fad, Beatlemania had become more ingrained in society, and by the group's influence on contemporary music.

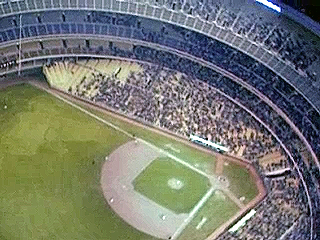
The Beatles' August 1965 performance at Shea Stadium (pictured in 1964) was the first of its kind.

The US tour commenced at Shea Stadium in New York City on 15 August. The circular stadium had been constructed the previous year with seating arranged in four ascending decks, all of which were filled for the concert. It was the first time that a large outdoor stadium had been used for such a purpose and attracted an audience of over 55,000 – the largest of any live concert that the Beatles performed. The event set records for attendance and revenue generation, with takings of $304,000 (equivalent to $3.11 million in 2025). (Note: The group played a standard 30-minute set. Their earnings were estimated at $100 (equivalent to $1,022 in 2025) for each second they were on stage.) According to The New York Times, the collective scream produced by the Shea Stadium audience escalated to a level that represented "the classic Greek meaning of the word pandemonium – the region of all demons". The band were astonished at the spectacle of the event, to which Lennon responded by acting in a mock-crazed manner and reducing Harrison to hysterical laughter as they played the closing song, "I'm Down". Starr later said: "I feel that on that show John cracked up ... not mentally ill, but he just got crazy ... playing the piano with his elbows."

The rest of the tour was highly successful, with well-attended shows on each of its ten dates, most of which took place in stadiums and sports arenas. In Houston, fans swarmed over the wings of the Beatles' chartered Lockheed Elektra; three days later, one of the plane's engines caught fire, resulting in a terrifying ordeal for the band on the descent into Portland. (Note: Witnessing the scene at Houston, Lennon joked, "It happens every time we come to Texas, we nearly get killed." In the early 1970s, Harrison met with their tour pilot who told him that the Elektra would routinely be riddled with bullet-holes – a result of fans' jealous boyfriends shooting at the plane on the runway.) A 50-minute concert film titled The Beatles at Shea Stadium was broadcast in the UK in March 1966. In the view of music critic Richie Unterberger, "there are few more thrilling Beatles concert sequences than the [film's] 'I'm Down' finale".

Also in 1965, the band's influence on American youth was the subject of condemnation by Christian conservatives such as Bob Larson and David Noebel, the latter a Baptist minister and member of the Christian Crusade. In a widely distributed pamphlet titled Communism, Hypnotism, and the Beatles, Noebel wrote that patriotic Americans were "in the fight of our lives and the lives of our children", and urged: "Let's make sure four mop-headed anti-Christ beatniks don't destroy our children's mental and emotional stability and ultimately destroy our nation." Later that year, Lennon complained about the 1965 US tour: "people kept bringing blind, crippled and deformed children into our dressing room and this boy's mother would say, 'Go on, kiss him, maybe you'll bring back his sight.' We're not cruel. We've seen enough tragedy in Merseyside ... We're going to remain normal if it kills us."

=== Rubber Soul and December 1965 UK tour ===
On 26 October 1965, 4,000 fans gathered outside Buckingham Palace in central London while the Beatles received their MBEs from the Queen. As the crowd chanted "Yeah, yeah, yeah!", some fans jostled with police officers and scaled the palace gates. The impossibility of travelling without being mobbed led to the Beatles abandoning live television appearances to promote their singles. In November, they filmed promotional clips for their double A-side single, "We Can Work It Out" / "Day Tripper", which could be played on shows such as Ready Steady Go! and Top of the Pops. This relieved the band from travelling to TV studios around the UK and allowed them to focus on recording their next album, Rubber Soul. In her study of Beatlemania, sociologist Candy Leonard says that Rubber Soul challenged some young fans, due to its more sophisticated lyrical and musical content, but its release in December 1965 marked the moment when "the Beatles came to occupy a role in fans' lives and a place in their psyches that was different from any previous fan–performer relationship."

Front cover of the Rubber Soul LP (designed by Robert Freeman)

The LP's cover contained a distorted, stretched image of the band's faces, which were nevertheless so instantly recognisable that no artist credit was necessary. Its surreal quality led some fans to write to the band's official fanzine, Beatles Monthly, alarmed that the group's appearance resembled that of corpses. Leonard writes that Rubber Soul initiated "close listening" among the Beatles' fanbase, particularly with regard to song lyrics, and studying the cover was part of the listening experience. Fans were fascinated by the photo and the change in the band's look. In Leonard's study, male fans recalled the significance of the band members' longer hair, individual clothes, and collective self-assuredness. The reaction from female fans varied; one found the cover "very sensual ... they looked grown up and sexy", while another described it as "scary, difficult, unpleasant", adding: "They looked menacing, like they were looking down on a victim. They looked like wooly mammoths, brown and leathery."

In the UK, the release was accompanied by speculation that the group's success would soon end, given that most acts there faded after two or three years at the top. The Beatles had also defied convention and Epstein's wishes by drastically reducing their concert schedule in 1965, and they disappointed fans by refusing to reprise their annual Christmas Show season. During the band's UK tour that December, some newspapers reported that the intensity of the fans' passion appeared to have diminished. In his review of the opening show in Glasgow, Alan Smith of the NME wrote that "Crazy Beatlemania is over, certainly", despite the prevalence of "fainting fits, and thunderous waves of screams". By the end of the tour, however, following a series of concerts in London, Smith wrote: "without question, BEATLEMANIA IS BACK! ... I have not seen hysteria like this at a Beatles show since the word Beatlemania erupted into headlines!"

== 1966: Final tours and controversies ==
=== Germany, Japan and the Philippines ===
After spending three months away from the public eye in early 1966, the Beatles were eager to depart from the formula imposed on them as pop stars, both in their music and in their presentation. Their first full group activity of the year was a photo session with photographer Robert Whitaker, who, having witnessed Beatlemania throughout the 1965 US tour, sought to humanise the band and counter impressions of their iconic status. A photo from this shoot, showing the group dressed in white butchers' coats and draped with pieces of raw meat and parts from plastic baby dolls, was submitted as the original cover image of a forthcoming US album, Yesterday and Today. In one explanation he subsequently gave, Whitaker said the meat and dismembered limbs symbolised the violence behind Beatlemania and what the band's fans would do to them without the presence of heavy security at their concerts.

By 1966, the Beatles were no longer willing to play shows in small venues such as the UK cinemas, but recognised the merit in continuing to perform in large stadiums. They played their final UK show on 1 May 1966 when they performed a short set at the NME Poll-Winners Concert, held at the Empire Pool in north-west London. In an opinion poll published in Melody Maker, 80 percent of respondents expressed deep disappointment in the group for their paucity of concert, TV and radio appearances, and most of those readers said that Beatlemania was in decline.

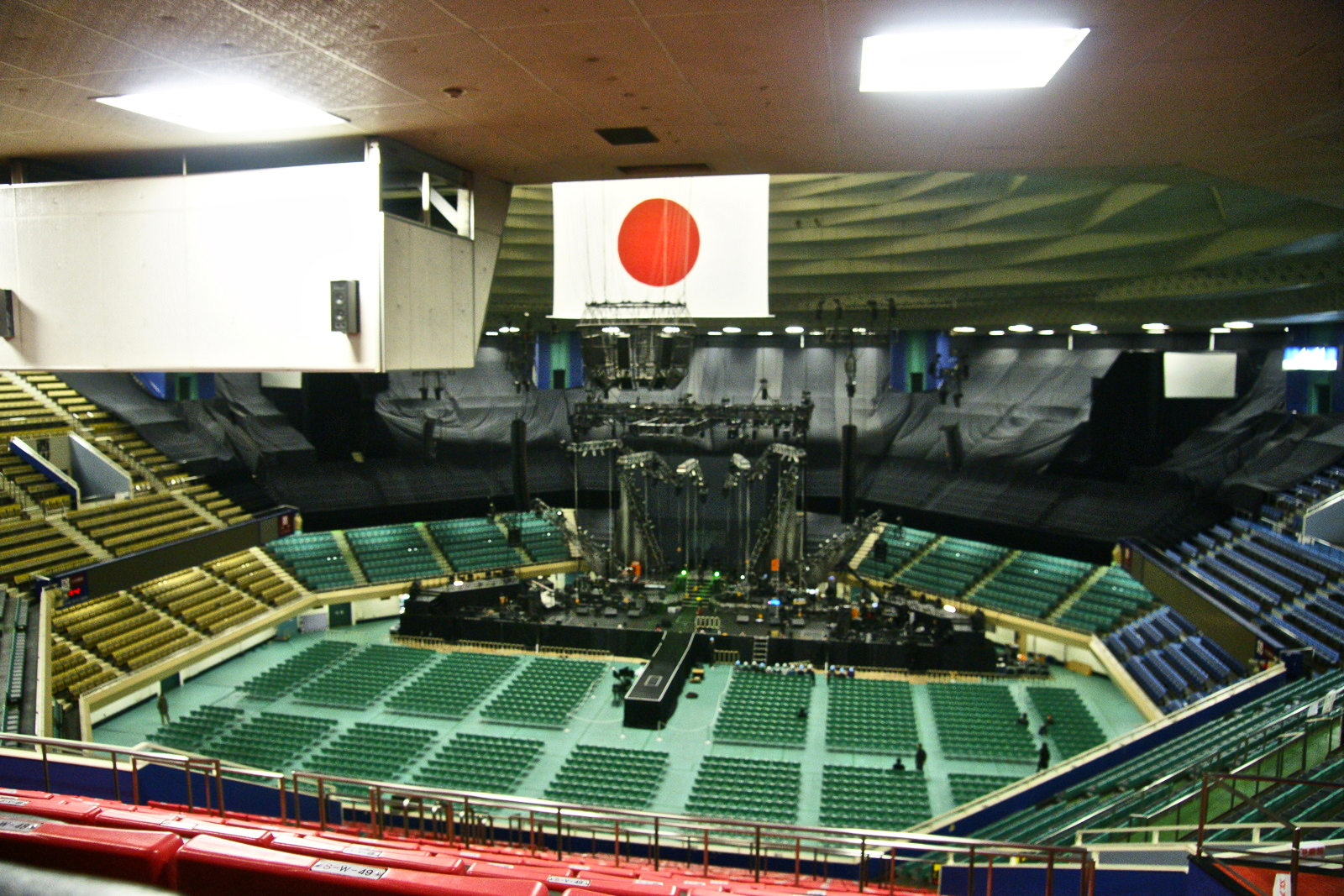
The Beatles' performance at the Budokan in Tokyo (pictured 2009) caused controversy as the venue was considered sacred ground.

After completing the recording for Revolver in late June, the Beatles set off on a tour combining concerts in West Germany, Japan and the Philippines. German police used tear gas and guard dogs to control fans in Essen, and in Tokyo, there was fear of terrorism surrounding the band's stay, forcing the members to be placed under heavy security in response to death threats from the country's hardline traditionalists. While in the Philippines in July, the group unintentionally snubbed first lady Imelda Marcos, who had expected them to attend her breakfast reception at Malacañang Palace in Manila. Epstein had declined the invitation on the band's behalf, as it had never been his policy to accept such official invitations. Riots resulted which endangered the group, and they escaped the Philippines with difficulty.

According to author Steve Turner, the three-country tour represented the dark side of Beatlemania and the band's fame. Whereas crowds breaking through a police barrier would have been the biggest concern up until the previous year, "Now it was mob revolt, violence, political backlash, and threats of assassination." In George Harrison's recollection:

Everywhere we were going [in 1966], there was a demonstration about one thing or another. In America the race riots were going on when Beatlemania had come to town. In Japan there were student riots, plus people were demonstrating because the Budokan (where we were playing) was supposed to be a special spiritual hall reserved for martial arts ... [In Manila] the whole place turned on us ... there were all the government officials or police, who were trying to punch us ... and then underneath that were the young kids who were still around doing the mania.

=== Revolver, "More popular than Jesus" and third American tour ===
The Beatles returned to the US on 11 August, shortly after the release of Revolver, for what became their last tour. It coincided with a storm of American public protest caused by Lennon's remark that the Beatles had become more popular than Christ. (Note: This development followed the controversy surrounding the artwork for Yesterday and Today in June, which was soon withdrawn and replaced with another group portrait.) Epstein had considered cancelling the 14-concert tour, fearing for their lives because of the severity of the protests, which included Beatles' records publicly burned and claims that the Beatles were "anti-Christ". There were disturbances on the tour, and one performance was brought to a temporary halt when a member of the audience threw a firecracker, leading the Beatles to believe that they were being shot at. They received telephone threats, and the Ku Klux Klan picketed some concerts. An ITN news team sent from London to cover the controversy reported that many teenagers in the US Bible Belt were among those offended by the Beatles. Lennon's comments had caused no upset when originally published in the UK, in March. However, John Grigg, in his column for The Guardian, had applied Lennon's description of Christ's disciples as "thick and ordinary" to the band's fans, saying: "Beatle maniacs are a distinct obstacle to higher appreciation of the Beatles."

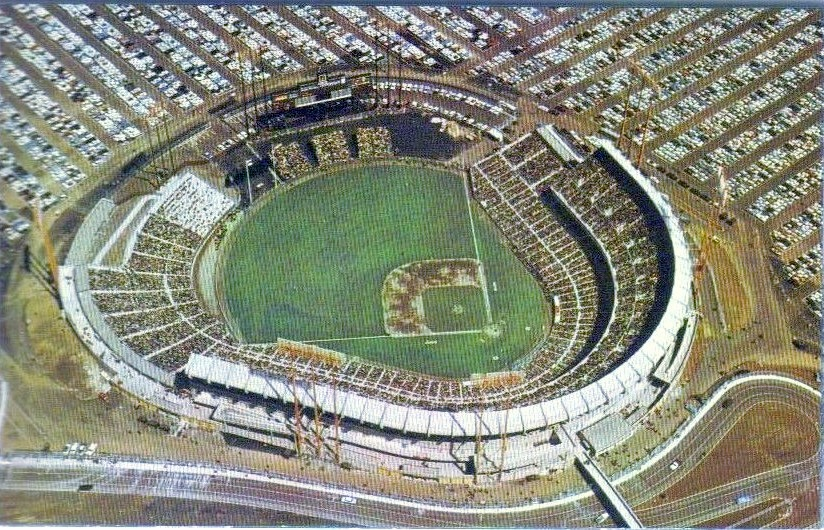
Candlestick Park, the last concert venue the Beatles performed

When the group arrived in New York, midtown traffic was brought to a standstill as two female fans, perched on a 22nd-storey ledge above Sixth Avenue, threatened to jump unless the Beatles visited them. Outside the Warwick Hotel, where the band stayed, clashes ensued between Christian demonstrators and the crowd of adoring fans. Throughout the tour, the US press nevertheless seized the opportunity to predict the end of Beatlemania, citing the bonfires and radio bans, but also, as detrimental factors to the Beatles' teenage appeal, the group's financial wealth and the artiness of their latest records.

The American tour ended on 29 August with a concert at Candlestick Park in San Francisco. While commercially successful, the tour had been affected by the prevailing mood of controversy; there were rows of empty seats at some venues and, according to Schaffner, "The screaming had also abated somewhat – one could occasionally even hear snatches of music." Comparing the 1965 Shea Stadium concert with the previous year's event, one commentator recalled that as before, "when the Beatles sang, the looks in the girls' eyes were faraway", but "It was different ... This time, we boys were almost as entranced, and the experience was more unifying than dividing." The band's final concert marked the end of a four-year period dominated by touring and concerts, with over 1,400 shows performed worldwide.

By 1966 the Beatles had become disenchanted with all aspects of touring – including fans offering themselves sexually to the band, the high-pitched screaming, and regular confinement in hotel rooms – and they were frustrated that the quality of their live performances was so at odds with the increasingly sophisticated music they created in the studio. (Note: Author Jon Savage describes the band's career as inhabiting "two separate time zones" by the summer of 1966 – "their present as increasingly experimental artists, and the past of Beatlemania".) Harrison was the first to tire of Beatlemania, while McCartney had continued to thrive on the adulation. McCartney finally ceded to his bandmates' insistence that the group stop touring towards the end of the 1966 tour. Lennon said that their concerts had become "bloody tribal rites" where crowds came merely to scream. Harrison later likened Beatlemania to the premise of Ken Kesey's novel One Flew over the Cuckoo's Nest, "where you are sane in the middle of something and they're all crackers". According to Starr, they gave up touring "at the right time", since "Four years of Beatlemania was enough for anyone."

== Post-touring fan culture and legacy ==
=== Response to revamped image and retirement from touring ===
1966 certainly marked the end of, as one irate Beatles Monthly correspondent put it, "The Beatles we used to know before they went stark, raving mad" ... But to the vast majority there was something uncanny, almost magical, about the Beatles' startling evolution. John, Paul, George, and Ringo seemed to have an unerring knack for staying one step ahead of their fans, so we made them our leaders and spokesmen, fondly imagining they had all the answers.

— Author Nicholas Schaffner

The Beatles gave no more commercial concerts from the end of their 1966 US tour until their break-up in 1970, instead devoting their efforts to creating new material in the recording studio. By late 1966, many young fans in the US had temporarily turned away from the Beatles, having found Revolver overly austere and lacking the fun aspect they expected of the band's music. Sensing this, two aspiring Hollywood filmmakers Bob Rafelson and Bert Schneider created The Monkees, a show starring an eponymous four-piece band in the Beatles' mould and evoking the spirit of their films A Hard Day's Night and Help! An immediate commercial success, the Monkees captured the teenybopper audience and elicited the frenzied adulation of early Beatlemania. For the younger Beatles fans, a weekly King Features cartoon series, titled The Beatles, maintained the innocent "moptop" image of previous years.

Following their final tour, the band members focused on individual interests and projects, and willingly ceded their traditionally dominant position over the Christmas sales period for 1966. The group's inactivity and lack of new music was reflected in the results of the end-of-year popularity polls conducted by magazines such as the NME, Record Mirror and Bravo. (Note: In the NME's readers poll, they came second to the Beach Boys in the top World Vocal Group category, marking the only year between 1963 and 1969 that the Beatles did not win in that category.) Their comments to the press also reflected a disillusionment with fame. In a feature article in Woman's Mirror magazine, Starr was quoted as saying that their image had become a "trap" in which they were pigeonholed as "Siamese quads eating out of the same bowl", while Lennon said, "We sort of half hope for the downfall. A nice downfall." (Note: The same writer, Maureen Cleave, cited a comment by Harrison in her round-up of 1966 for The Evening Standard: "If we do slip [in popularity], so what? ... Being a Beatle isn't the living end.")

The Beatles issued a double A-side single containing "Strawberry Fields Forever" and "Penny Lane" – their first new music since Revolver – in February 1967. The accompanying promotional films eschewed performance in favour of avant-garde imagery; they showed the band members' adoption of facial hair, a detail that challenged the convention for youthful-looking pop stars. The films confused many of their fans and drew unfavourable responses from the audience on American Bandstand, the leading pop music show in the US. When the single failed to reach number one on the Record Retailer chart, British press agencies speculated that the group's run of success might have ended, with headlines such as "Beatles Fail to Reach the Top", "First Time in Four Years" and "Has the Bubble Burst?" However, the American cultural press, responding to appreciations of the Beatles' artistry in Time and Newsweek, lauded the two songs for their experimental qualities. According to author Bernard Gendron, "An adult Beatlemania was in effect replacing the apparently fading 'teenybopper' Beatlemania, supplanting the screams and rituals of worship with breathless reportage and grandiloquent praise."

Sgt. Pepper's Lonely Hearts Club Band was released in May and became a major critical and commercial success. According to Gould, the album immediately revolutionised "both the aesthetics and the economics of the record business in ways that far outstripped the earlier pop explosions triggered by the Elvis phenomenon of 1956 and the Beatlemania phenomenon of 1963".

=== Final public gatherings ===
Beatlemania continued on a reduced scale after the band's retirement from live performances and into their solo careers. In late August 1967, 2000 fans protested outside Shea Stadium at the band's failure to perform in the US that summer. When the Beatles travelled around the south of England filming their television film Magical Mystery Tour in September 1967, it was the first opportunity for most members of the public to see the band together in over a year. Gavrik Losey, a production assistant on the film, recalled: "We were staying in a little hotel outside West Malling and the crowd that came pushed in the front window of the hotel ... That level of adoration is just amazing to be around."

The last mass display of fan adulation took place at the world premiere of the Beatles' animated film Yellow Submarine, held at the London Pavilion in Piccadilly Circus on 17 July 1968. The event was attended by the four band members and, according to Miles, "Fans as usual brought traffic to a standstill and blocked the streets." A rare example of the Beatles interacting with fans was when they filmed a promotional clip for their "Hey Jude" single in September 1968, surrounded by a studio audience. Marc Sinden, later an actor and film director, recalled: "It was the days of screaming, but nobody screamed. We were suddenly in the presence of God. That's the only way I can describe it. These people had changed history. We grew up with them."

=== Social impact ===
The Beatles' popularity and influence grew into what was seen as an embodiment of socio-cultural movements of the decade. In Gould's view, they became icons of the 1960s counterculture and a catalyst for bohemianism and activism in various social and political arenas, fuelling movements such as women's liberation and environmentalism. A 1997 study titled "Beatlemania: A sexually defiant consumer subculture?" argued that Beatlemania represented a proto-feminist demonstration of girl power. In their 1986 book, Ehrenreich, Hess and Jacobs comment that, but for the girls' hairstyles and clothing, the photos and footage of young Beatles fans in confrontation with police suggest a women's liberation demonstration from the late 1960s rather than a 1964 pop event. The authors add: "Yet if it was not the 'movement,' or a clear-cut protest of any kind, Beatlemania was the first mass outburst of the '60s to feature women – in this case girls, who would not reach full adulthood until the '70s – and the emergence of a genuinely political movement for women's liberation." Derek Taylor, the band's press officer in 1964 and from 1968 until their break-up, described the relationship between the Beatles and their fans as "the twentieth century's greatest romance".

The first band after the Beatles to receive widespread attention for its fan following in the UK was T.Rex, a glam-rock group led by Marc Bolan. In the early 1970s, the fan frenzy surrounding the band earned comparisons with Beatlemania and became known as "Bolanmania" and "T.Rextasy". Coincidentally, in the same vein of the British Glam Rock movement, David Bowie in 1972–1973 during his Ziggy Stardust Tour, and with five albums in the UK charts according to the press reached a Beatle-like popularity in the UK. Later in the decade, the British press coined the term "Rollermania" for female fans' adulation of the Bay City Rollers. Writing in The Observer in 2013, Dorian Lynskey said, "the tropes of Beatlemania have recurred in fan crazes from the Bay City Rollers to Bros, East 17 to One Direction: the screaming, the queuing, the waiting, the longing, the trophy-collecting, the craving for even the briefest contact." In their book Encyclopedia of Classic Rock, David Luhrssen and Michael Larson state that while boy bands such as One Direction continue to attract audiences of screaming girls, "none of those acts moved pop culture forward or achieved the breadth and depth of the Beatles' fandom." André Millard similarly writes that, just as Beatlemania's "scale and ferocity" far surpassed the scenes of adulation inspired by Sinatra, Presley and Johnnie Ray, "nobody in popular entertainment has been able to repeat this moment in all its economic and cultural significance."

Beatlemania was widespread in the eastern world too; Ali Khamenei (former Supreme Leader of Iran) noted that during the 1960s, Iranian youngsters were heavily influenced by The Beatles hairstyle and clothing, which he dismissed.

== See also ==
- The Beatles: Eight Days a Week – 2016 documentary film on the Beatles' touring years
- Apple scruffs – a loosely knit group of Beatles fans who were known for congregating outside the Apple Corps building and at the gates of Abbey Road Studios
- The Fest for Beatles Fans – twice-annual Beatles convention first held in New York in 1974
