= Roosevelt School (Lake Wales, Florida) =

- U.S. National Register of Historic Places
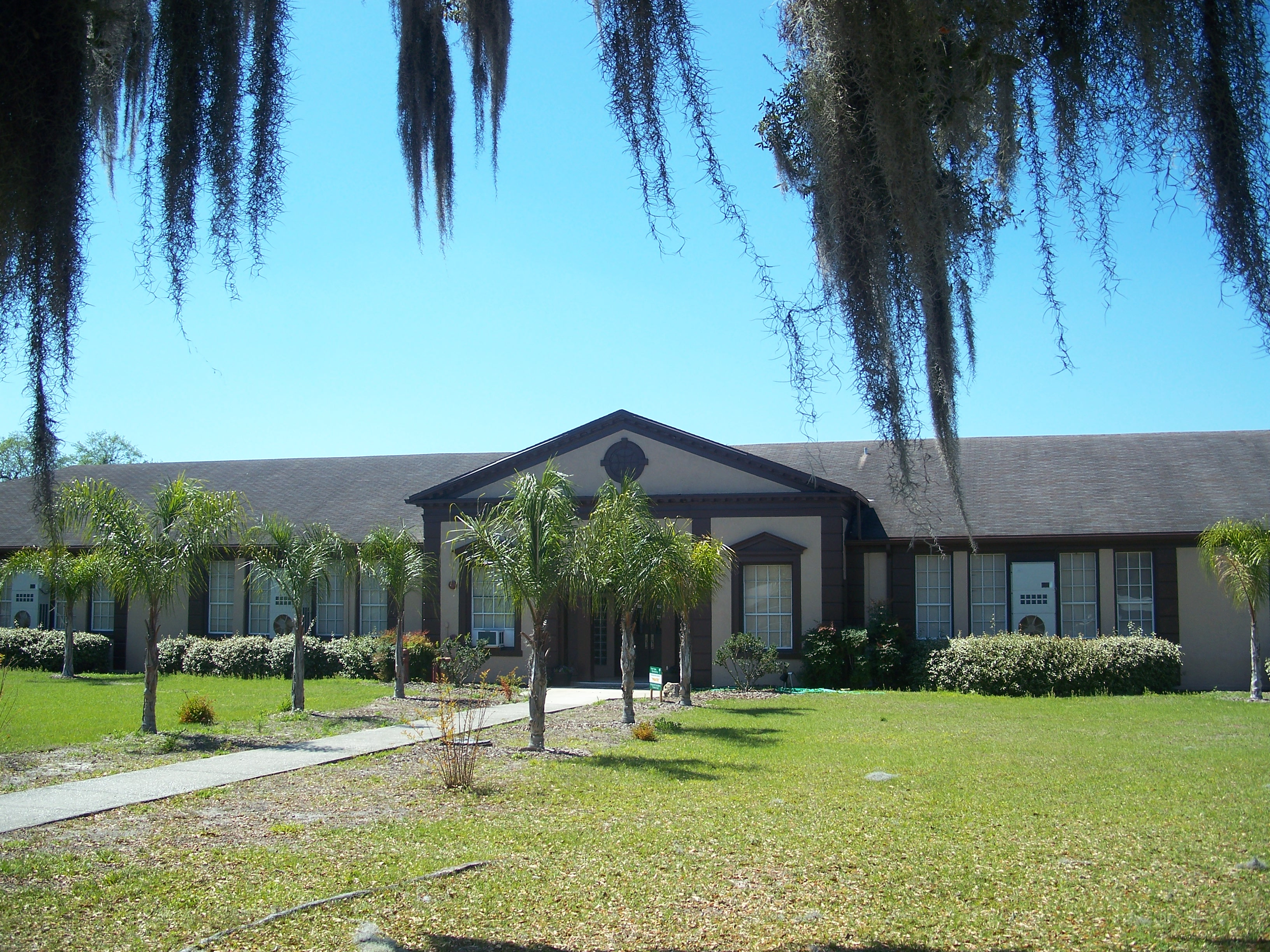

- Location within Florida Location within the United States
- Location: Lake Wales, Florida
- Coordinates: 27°54′39″N 81°35′44″W
- Area: less than one acre
- Architect: Wilbur B. Talley, Howard B. Trauger
- Website: https://rooseveltacademy.polkschoolsfl.com/
- NRHP reference No.: 01000306
- Added to NRHP: March 29, 2001

The Roosevelt School (also known as the Roosevelt Academy) is a historic school in Lake Wales, Florida. It is located at 115 E Street. On March 29, 2001, it was added to the U.S. National Register of Historic Places. Originally this school served the African-American Community or the Northwest community in Lake Wales. Currently it is an ESE vocational school specifically designed to teach and train students in grades 6–12 with learning disabilities to adapt and excel in society

Roosevelt School - This school was completed in 1937 and named for Franklin Delano Roosevelt. Classes were held for grades 1 - 9. In 1939, it became a full-fledged senior high school. In May 1940 the first commencement exercises were held with 13 students being granted diplomas. In 1950, the addition of Unit G was made; in 1955, Units A, B, D, E, were added and the gymnasium was constructed in 1957. Enrollment during the 1960s reached over 1,300. Roosevelt served African-American students from Frostproof as well as Lake Wales.

Roosevelt Academy - In the early 1980s Roosevelt was converted to a vocational school and is part of the Polk County School System.
