= Old Flagler County Courthouse =

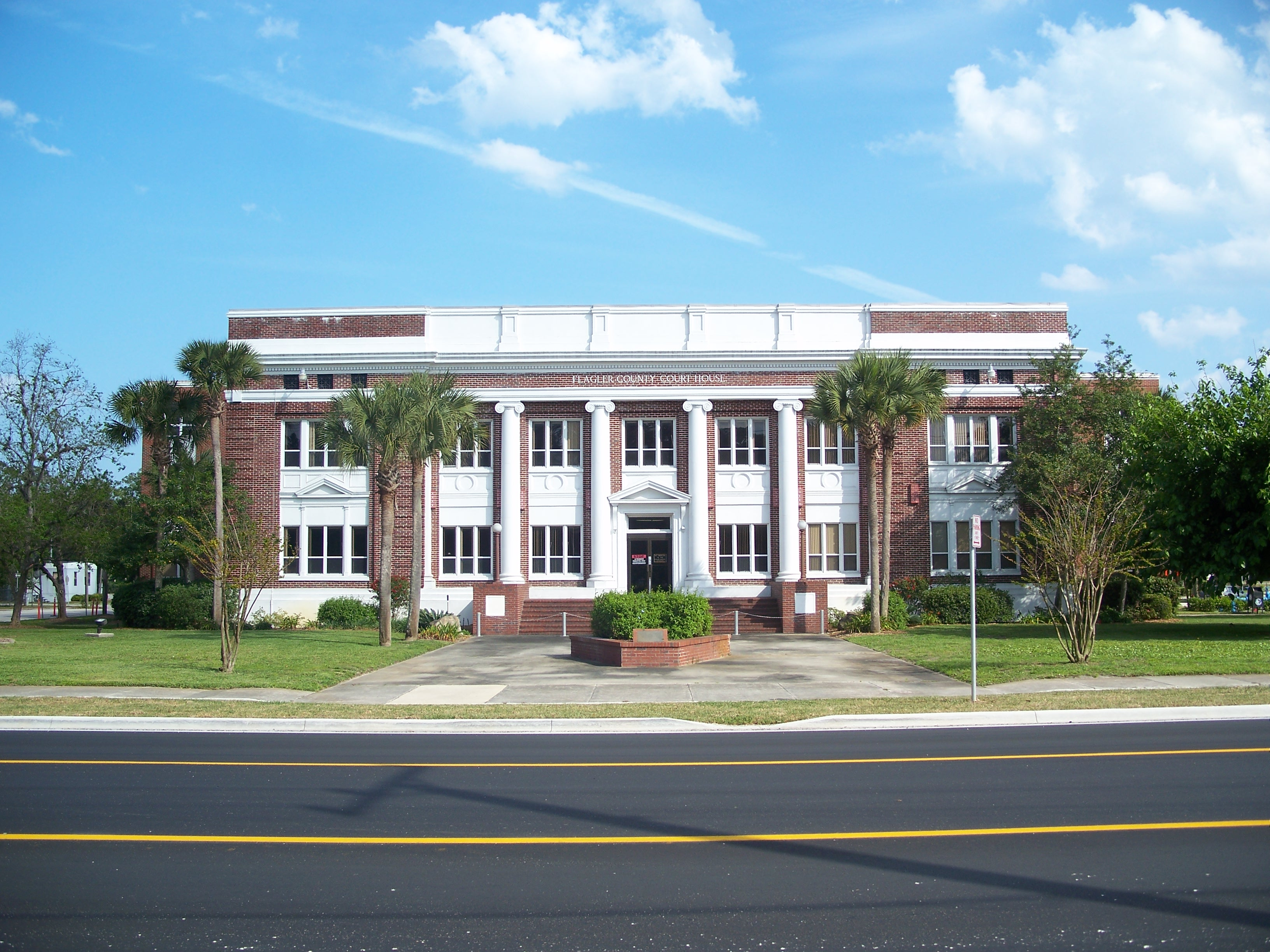
- Old Flagler County Courthouse
- Interactive map of the Old Flagler County Courthouse area

General information
- Architectural style: Classical Revival
- Location: Bunnell, Florida, United States
- Coordinates: 29°27′59″N 81°15′26″W
- Completed: 1924
- Cost: $
- Client: Flagler County

Design and construction
- Architect: Wilbur Talley
- Engineer: Builder: O.P. Woocock

The Old Flagler County Courthouse is an historic two-story redbrick courthouse building located at 200 East Moody Boulevard in Bunnell, Florida. Designed by Wilbur Talley in the Classical Revival style, it was built in 1924 by O. P. Woodcock to serve Flagler County which had been created in 1917. It was the county's second courthouse building and its first purpose-built one. In 1985 a three-story addition was attached to its rear. In January 2007 the 1924 building was closed due to safety problems with its roof. By January 2008, the 1985 addition had also been vacated due to structural problems. Courthouse operations are now housed at the Kim C. Hammond Justice Center 1769 East Moody Boulevard.

In 1989, the Old Flagler County Courthouse was listed in A Guide to Florida's Historic Architecture, published by the University of Florida Press.
