= George F. Bensel House =

Coordinates: 30.3091°N 81.6834°W

The George F. Bensel House is a historic residence built in 1912 in Jacksonville, Florida. It was designed by Wilbur B. Talley. Bensel, president of Southern States Land & Timber, was the original owner. The house is located at 2165 River Boulevard and is considered to be in the prairie architecture style.
