= Sanford Grammar School =

- U.S. National Register of Historic Places
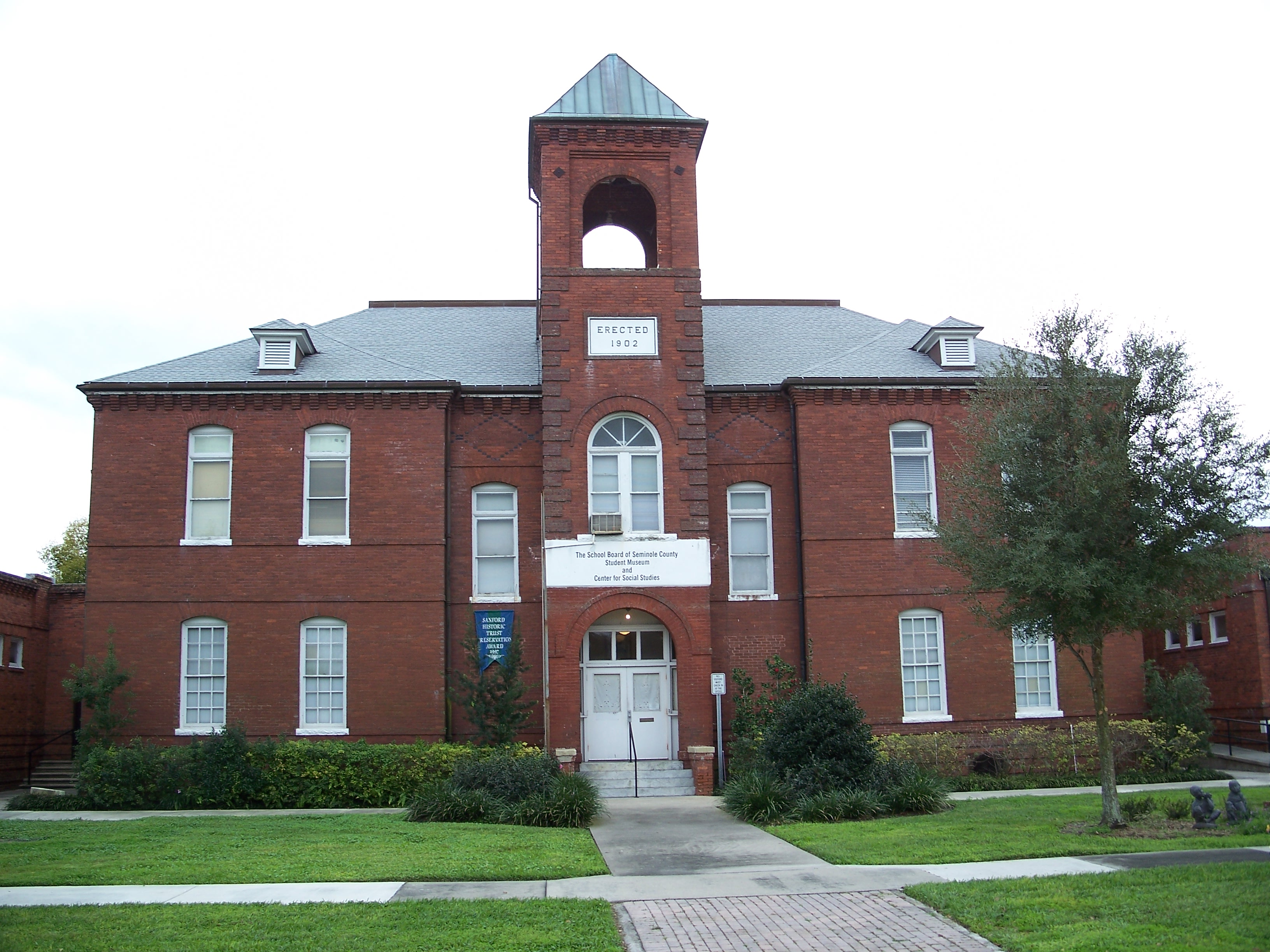

- Location within Florida Location within the United States
- Location: 301 West 7th Street, Sanford, Florida; United States
- Coordinates: 28°48′20″N 81°16′15″W
- Built: 1902; 124 years ago
- Architect: Wilbur Talley
- Architectural style: Romanesque Revival
- NRHP reference No.: 84000253
- Added to NRHP: November 23, 1984

The Sanford Grammar School, also known as the Sanford High School and as the Margaret K. Reynolds Building, is a historic school building located at 301 West 7th Street in Sanford, Florida, United States. Built in 1902, it was designed by Wilbur B. Talley in the Romanesque Revival style of architecture. Sanford architect Elton James Moughton designed the wings which were added in 1916. On November 23, 1984, it was added to the U.S. National Register of Historic Places.

In 1989, it was listed in A Guide to Florida's Historic Architecture prepared by the Florida Association of the American Institute of Architects and published by the University of Florida Press.

== Student Museum and Public History Center ==
The Sanford Student Museum and Public History Center, operated through a partnership between the Seminole County Public Schools and The University of Central Florida, is located in the historic school building. Exhibits include geography, Native Americans, pioneer life, early education, the local African-American neighborhood of Georgetown, antique household items, dolls and local history. The museum is focused on programs for local school groups, but is open to the public on specific afternoons each week.
