= Wilbur B. Talley =

American architect

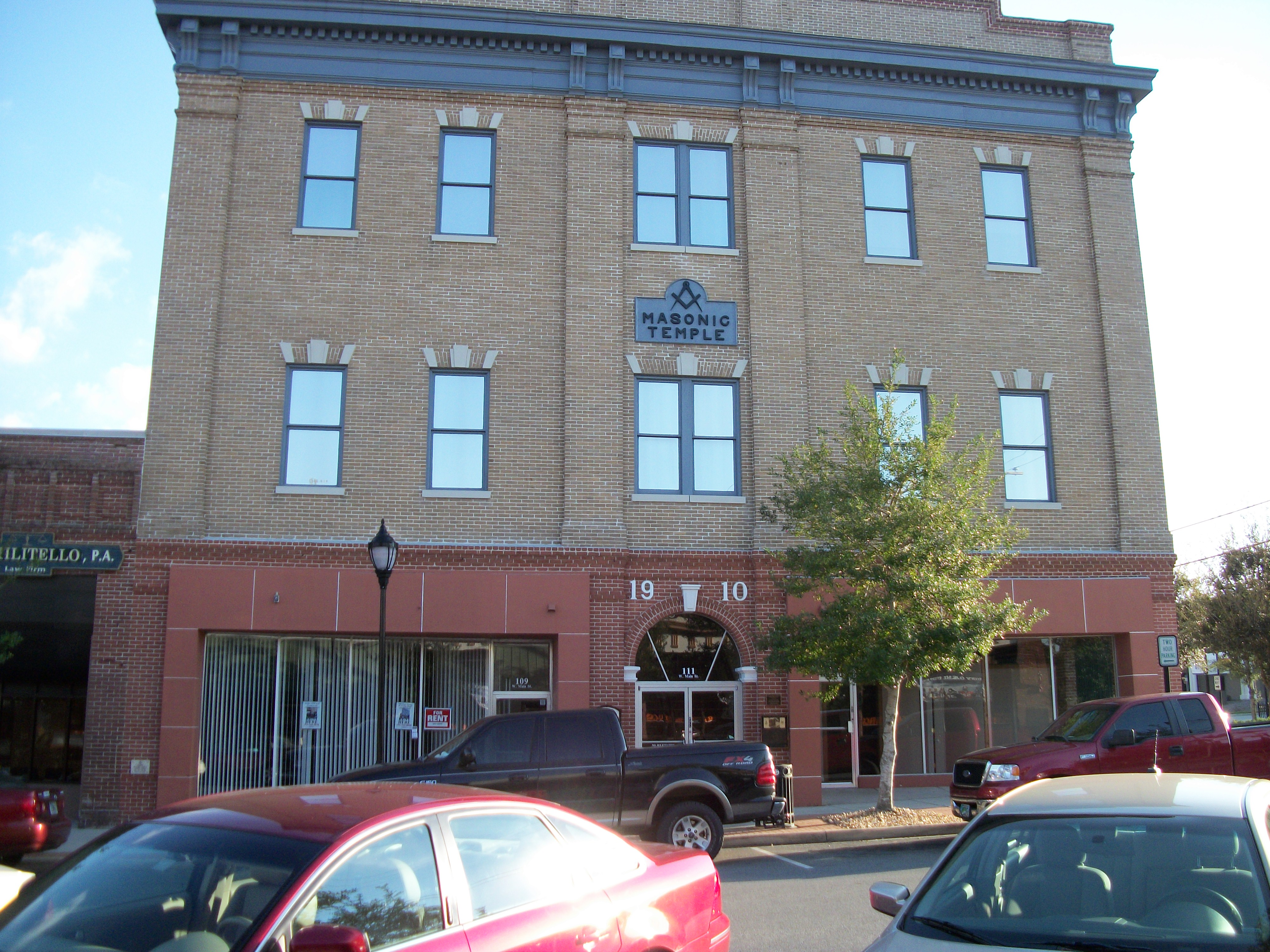
Inverness Masonic Temple

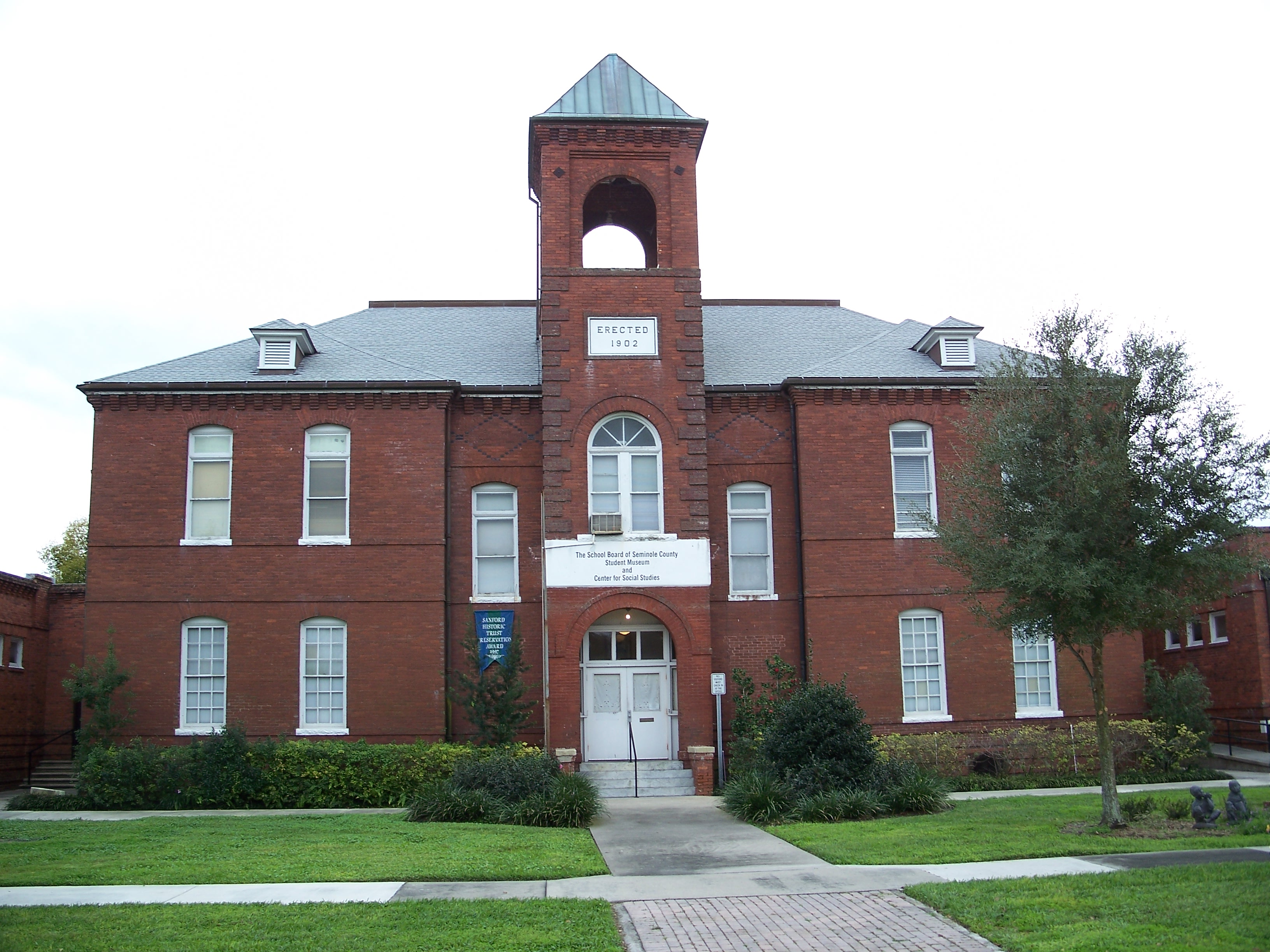
Sanford Grammar School

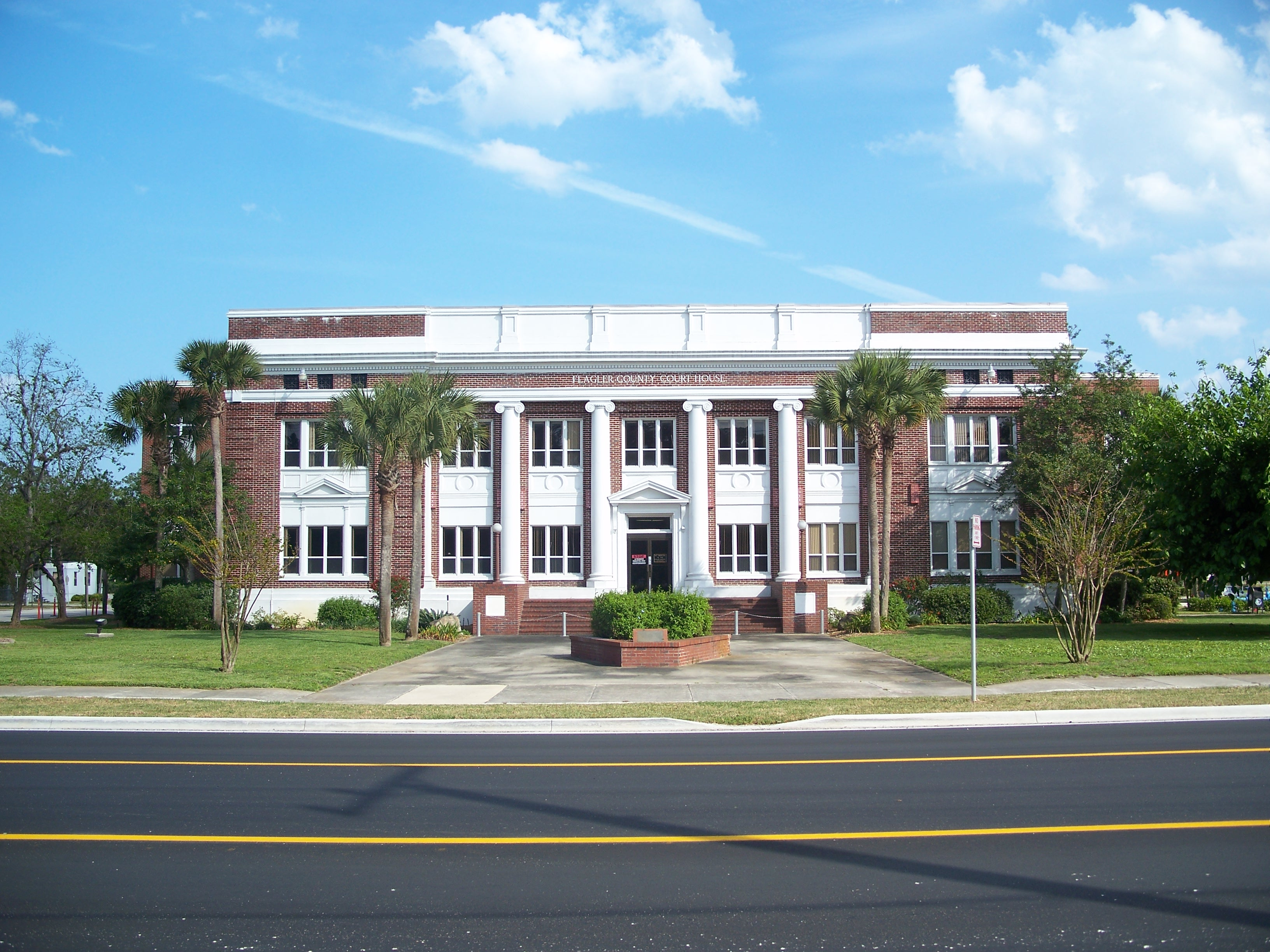
Old Flagler County Courthouse

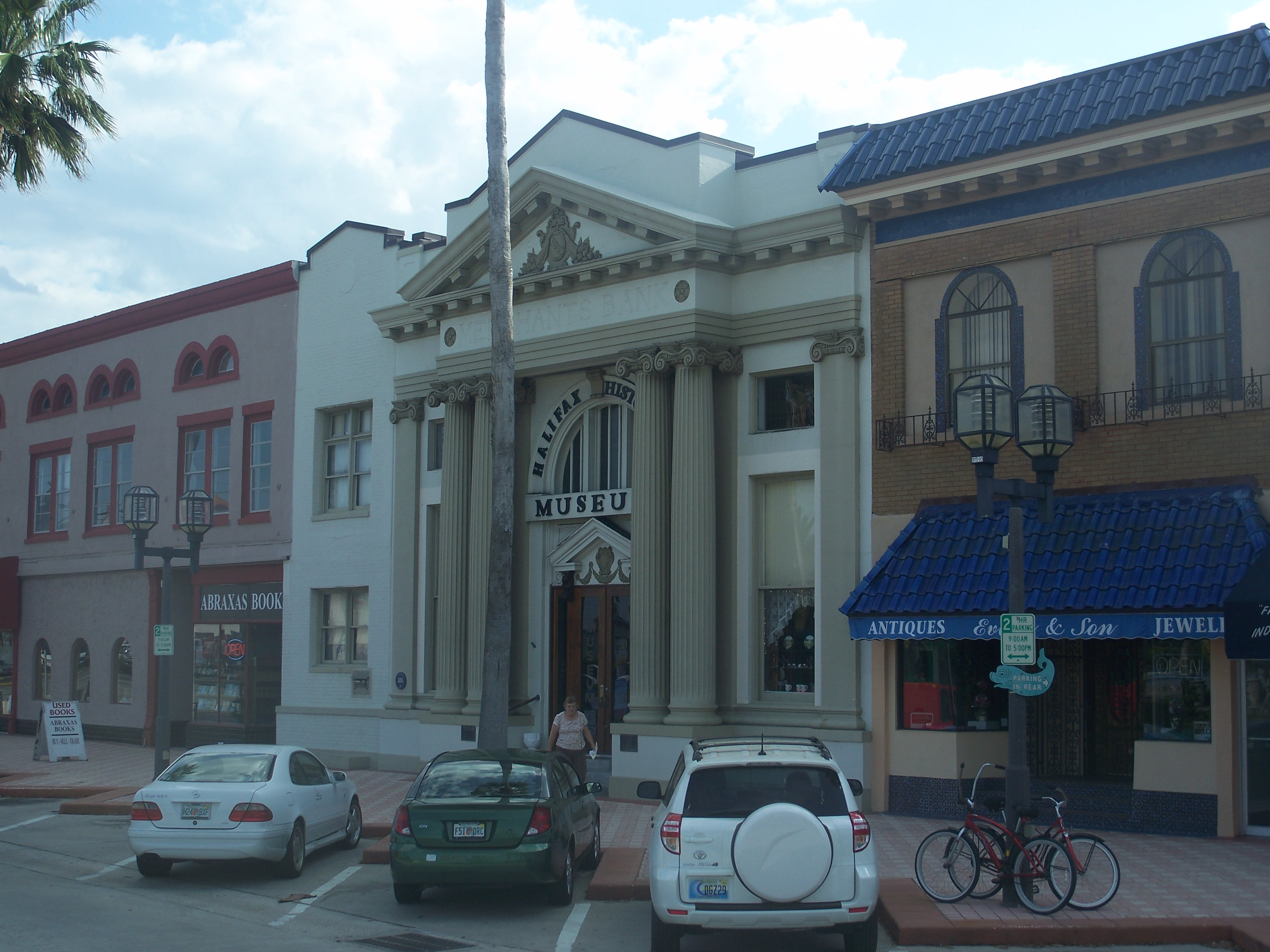
Merchant's Bank Building (now the Halifax Historical Museum)

Wilbur B. Talley was an architect in Florida. He worked in Jacksonville until the death of his wife Nellie and daughter Sarah, who were killed when the car they were riding in was hit by a train on December 21,1919. After the accident, he moved to Lakeland, Florida where he continued working as an architect.

Talley designed many homes, including in the Riverside and Avondale areas of Jacksonville. He was one of the founders of the Florida Association of the American Institute of Architects and worked in many areas of Florida and designed churches in Jacksonville, St. Augustine, Lakeland and Tampa. He designed schools in Florida, Lake City, Ocala, Kissimmee, Orlando, Eau Gallie, and Sanford. His governmental building designs include the Palm Beach County Courthouse, Duval County Courthouse Annex, Duval County Armory, and Old Flagler County Courthouse. He also designed the Bradford County Bank Building in Starke and the Merchant's Bank Building (now the Halifax Historical Museum) in Daytona Beach. His architectural styles included Romanesque architecture, Gothic Revival architectures and Classical Revival architecture and Prairie style architecture. Several of his buildings are listed on the National Register of Historic Places and completed the design of several residences in Riverside and Springfield.

National Register of Historic Places listed properties include:

- Henley Field Ball Park, 1125 N. Florida Ave. Lakeland, FL Talley, W.B. & W.D.
- Lake Wales Historic Residential District, Roughly bounded by the Seaboard Airline RR grade, CSX RR tracks, E. Polk Ave., S. and N. Lake Shore Blvds. Lake Wales, FL Talley, Wilbur B.
- Halifax Historical Museum in the former Merchants Bank Building, 252 S. Beach St. Daytona Beach, FL Talley, W.B.
- Munn Park Historic District, Roughly bounded by E. Bay St., N. Florida Ave., E. Orange St., and E. Main St. Lakeland, FL Talley, Wilbur B.
- Roosevelt School (Lake Wales, Florida), 115 East St. N Lake Wales, FL Talley, Wilbur B.
- Sanford Grammar School, 7th and Myrtle Sts. Sanford, FL Walker & Talley

== Projects ==
- Masonic Temple of Citrus Lodge No. 118, F. and A.M. (NRHP listed)
- George Bensel Residence at 2165 River Boulevard (1912) St. Johns Quarter, Jacksonville
- Bradford County Bank (1914), now home to the North Florida Regional Chamber of Commerce at 100 East Call Street in Starke, Florida
- Old Flagler County Courthouse (1924)
- Sanford Grammar School (NRHP listed)
- Merchant's Bank Building (now the Halifax Historical Museum) NRHP listed
- Duval County Armory
