= Hotel George Washington (Jacksonville) =

Luxury hotel in Jacksonville, Florida

Coordinates: 30.329°N 81.661°W

A 1947 postcard advertising the Hotel George Washington

The Hotel George Washington was a 15-story luxury hotel in Jacksonville, Florida. Located on the corner of Adams and Julia Streets, it was in operation from 1926 to 1971. In its later years, it was one of only two luxury hotels in the downtown area. By the 1960s, it was the only five-star hotel in the area after the demise of the Hotel Roosevelt.

== History ==
On Armistice Day 1925, local businessman Robert Kloeppel announced to crowds in downtown Jacksonville that a luxury hotel would be built. The local firm of Marsh and Saxelbye served as architects. Other investors built the Hotel Roosevelt (then called the Carling Hotel) to compete with Kloeppel, and both hotels were constructed throughout 1926. On December 15, the George Washington was complete. The mayor at the time, John Alsop, along with the current and former Florida governor, were on hand for ribbon-cutting ceremonies. Radios were installed in every one of the 350 rooms so visitors could listen to opening-day festivities, broadcast by radio station WJAX. Kloeppel spent $1.5 million of his own money to construct the hotel. The "Hotel George Washington" sign, built on the rooftop, was the first neon sign in Jacksonville.

The Hotel George Washington, in its heyday, was the center of cultural activities in Jacksonville. The George Washington Auditorium, built in 1941, was the biggest concert hall in town at the time (replacing the Duval County Armory), big enough for classical music events and cotillion balls. The Hotel housed a steakhouse, a cocktail lounge, a dance hall called the Rainbow Room, a Rexall drugstore and a barber shop. Charles Lindbergh stayed at the George Washington while visiting Jacksonville.

=== The Beatles ===
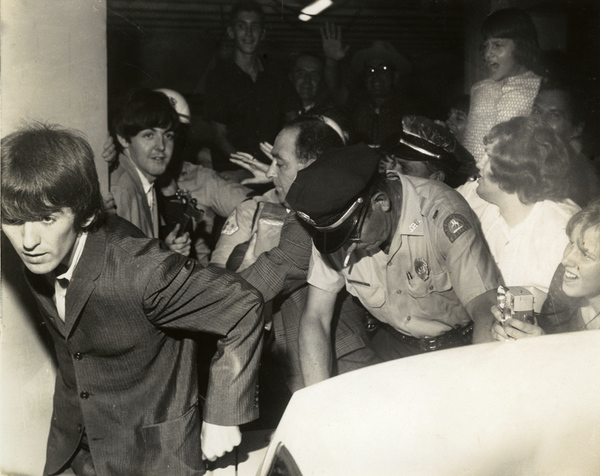
George Harrison and Paul McCartney being escorted through a crowd of fans at the Hotel George Washington, September 1964. The Beatles held a press conference there during their visit to Jacksonville but refused to stay at the hotel.

The Beatles were scheduled to perform on September 11, 1964 at the Gator Bowl in Jacksonville, where they supposedly overheard that the venue was segregated. They refused to play until the local officials and promoters assured them that it would be an integrated audience. City officials responded that the concert had never been slated to be segregated.

As the group headed from Montreal to Jacksonville, their flight was diverted to Key West due to Hurricane Dora. They traveled to Jacksonville the same day of the concert with no hotel accommodation because the Hotel George Washington in Jacksonville, which was initially booked, was segregated and would not change their operating procedure. When asked by reporters about the cancellation of the hotel, George Harrison said, "We don't know about our accommodations at all. We don't arrange that. But you know, we don't appear anywhere there is [segregation]."

=== Closure ===
In 1964, most of the businesses which operated from the Roosevelt's ground floor moved into the George Washington. Despite the new infusion of business, behind-the-scenes turnover caused the George Washington to fall into disrepair. In 1963, original owner Robert Kloeppel sold the George Washington to dog track magnate Bill Johnson, who in turn sold the hotel to other investors in 1969.

After 1969, one by one, the businesses inside the ground floor went out of business. The hotel was closed in 1971 and torn down in 1973. Currently, the site is occupied by the parking garage of the new Jacksonville Electric Authority (JEA) headquarters building that is under construction as of mid 2021.

== Notes ==
1. 'Twas a grand time for a grand hotel, Bill Foley for The Florida Times-Union; November 14, 1998; accessed August 2, 2018.
2. Fan Recalls Beatles Invasion of Jacksonville, Deanna Fene for First Coast NewsWTLV/WJXX; February 10, 2004; accessed May 27, 2007.
