= Halifax Historical Museum =

History museum in Daytona Beach, Florida

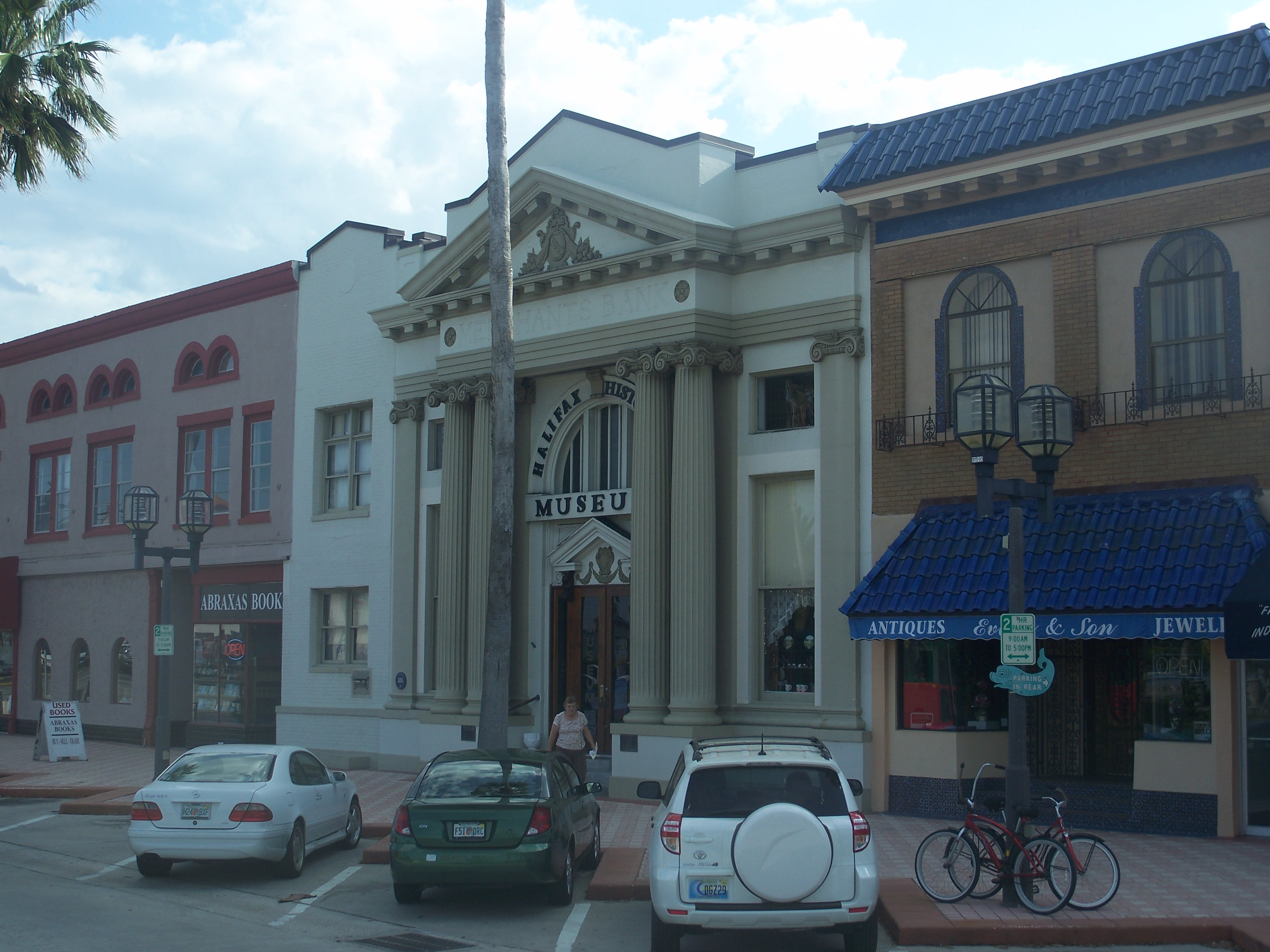

- Location within Volusia County
- Established: 1984
- Location: 252 South Beach Street; Daytona Beach, Florida
- Coordinates: 29.208386°N 81.017658°W
- Type: History
- Director: Heather Files
- Website: Halifax Historical Museum
- Merchants Bank Building
- U.S. National Register of Historic Places
- Location: Daytona Beach, Florida United States
- Built: 1910 and 1926
- Architect: W.B. Talley, Hall & Bond
- Architectural style: Greek Revival, Beaux Arts
- NRHP reference No.: 86000025
- Added to NRHP: January 6, 1986

The Halifax Historical Museum displays local history from 5,000 BC to the present day in a National Register of Historic Places listed building designed by Wilbur B. Talley in Daytona Beach, Florida, United States. The museum is housed in the former Merchants Bank building (1910), added to the U.S. National Register of Historic Places on January 6, 1986. It is located at 252 South Beach Street.
