= Old Hernando Elementary School =

- U.S. National Register of Historic Places
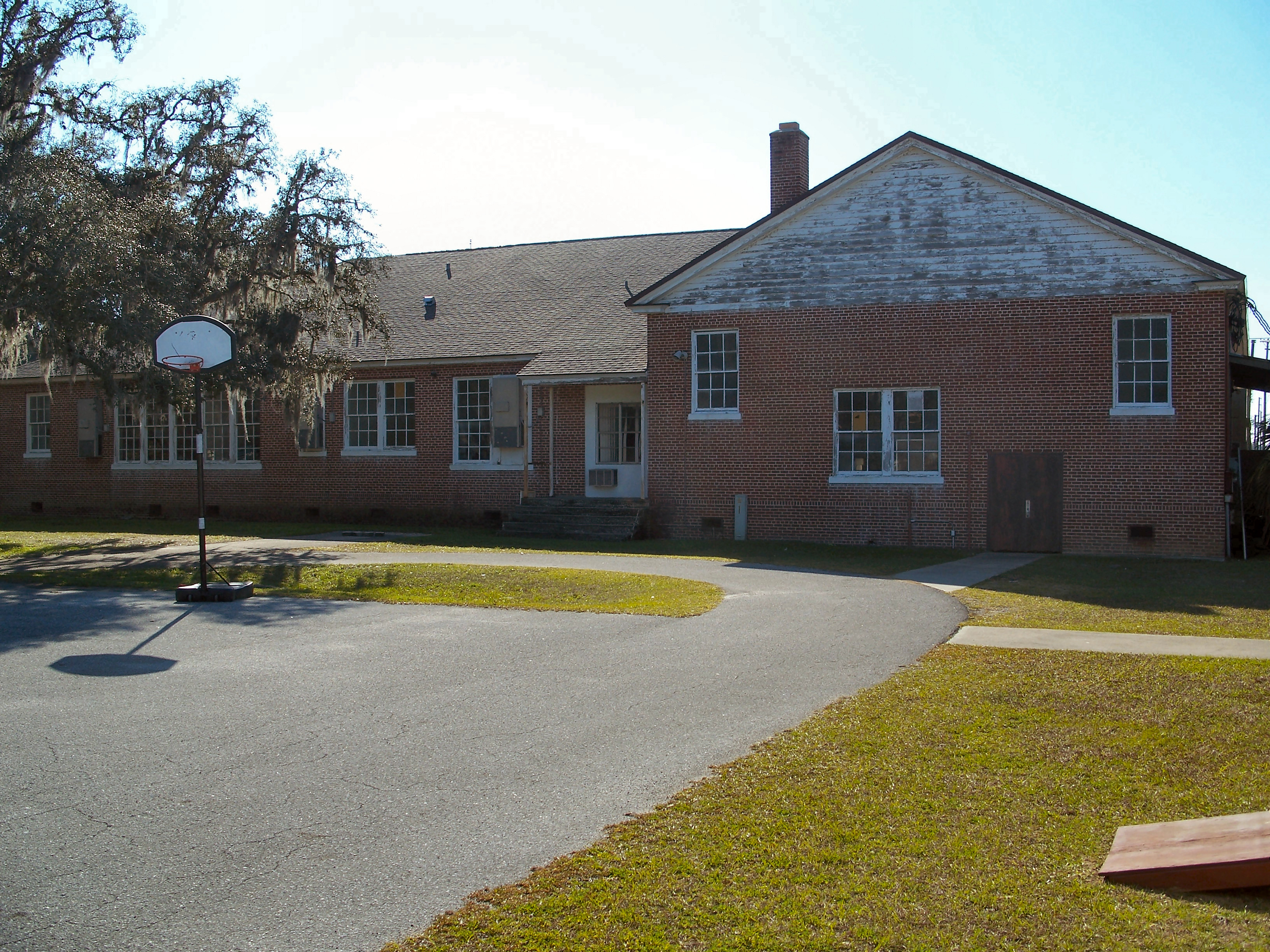

- Location within Florida Location within the United States
- Location: Hernando, Florida
- Coordinates: 28°53′54″N 82°22′21″W
- Built: 1941-42
- Architect: Henry L. Taylor, Works Project Administration
- Architectural style: Colonial Revival
- NRHP reference No.: 00001129
- Added to NRHP: May 4, 2001

The Old Hernando Elementary School (also known as the Lakeview School) is a historic site in Hernando, Florida, United States. It is located at 2435 North Florida Avenue. On May 4, 2001, it was added to the U.S. National Register of Historic Places.
