= Masonic Temple of Citrus Lodge No. 118, F. and A.M. =

- U.S. National Register of Historic Places
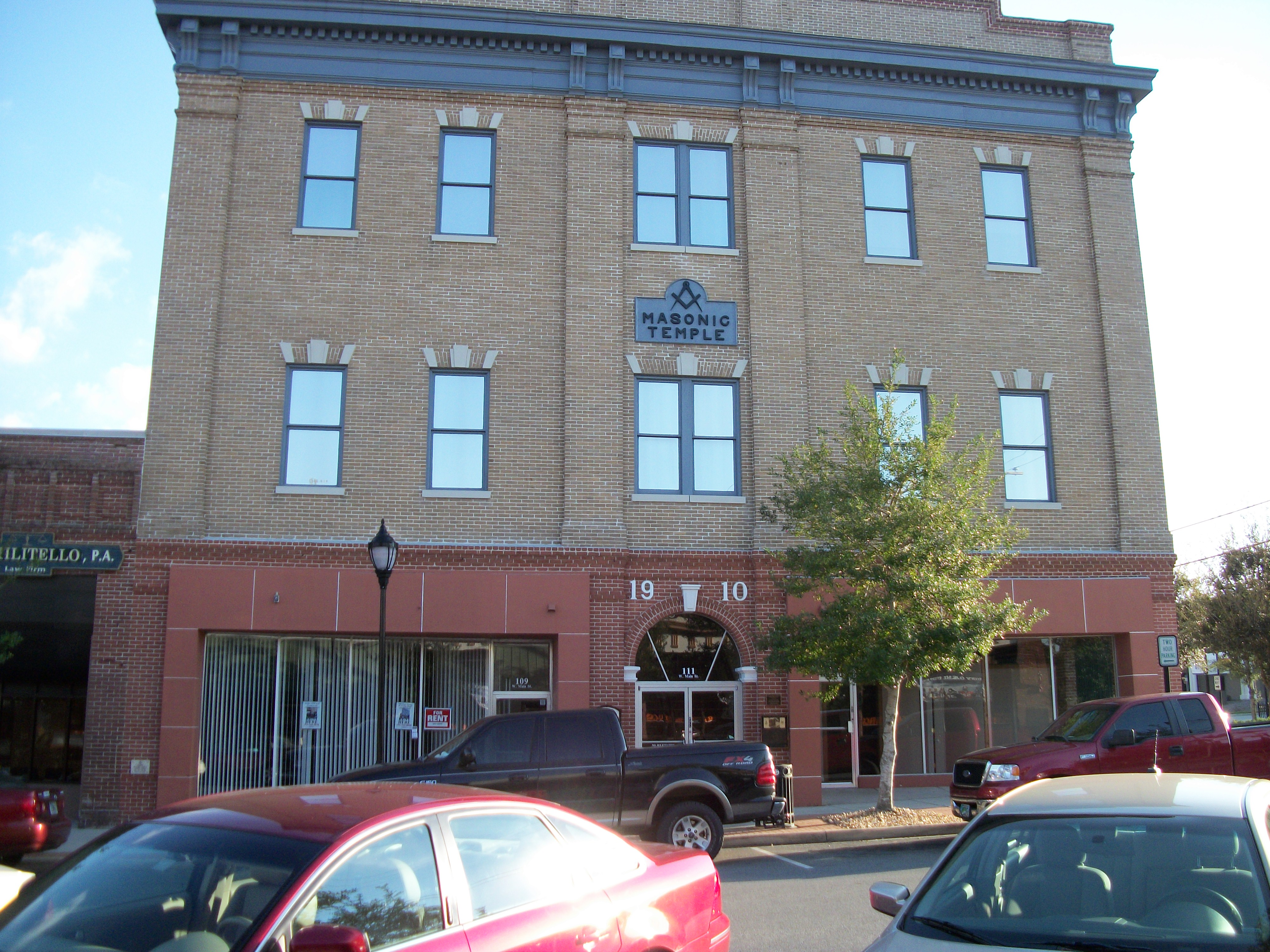
- The former Masonic Temple, as seen from across Old Main Street(formerly West Main Street)

- Location within Florida Location within the United States
- Location: 111 West Main Street and 95 South Pine Avenue, Inverness, Florida
- Coordinates: 28.83581°N 82.33127°W
- Built: 1910
- Architect: W.B Talley
- Architectural style: Neoclassical
- NRHP reference No.: 10000387
- Added to NRHP: June 23, 2010

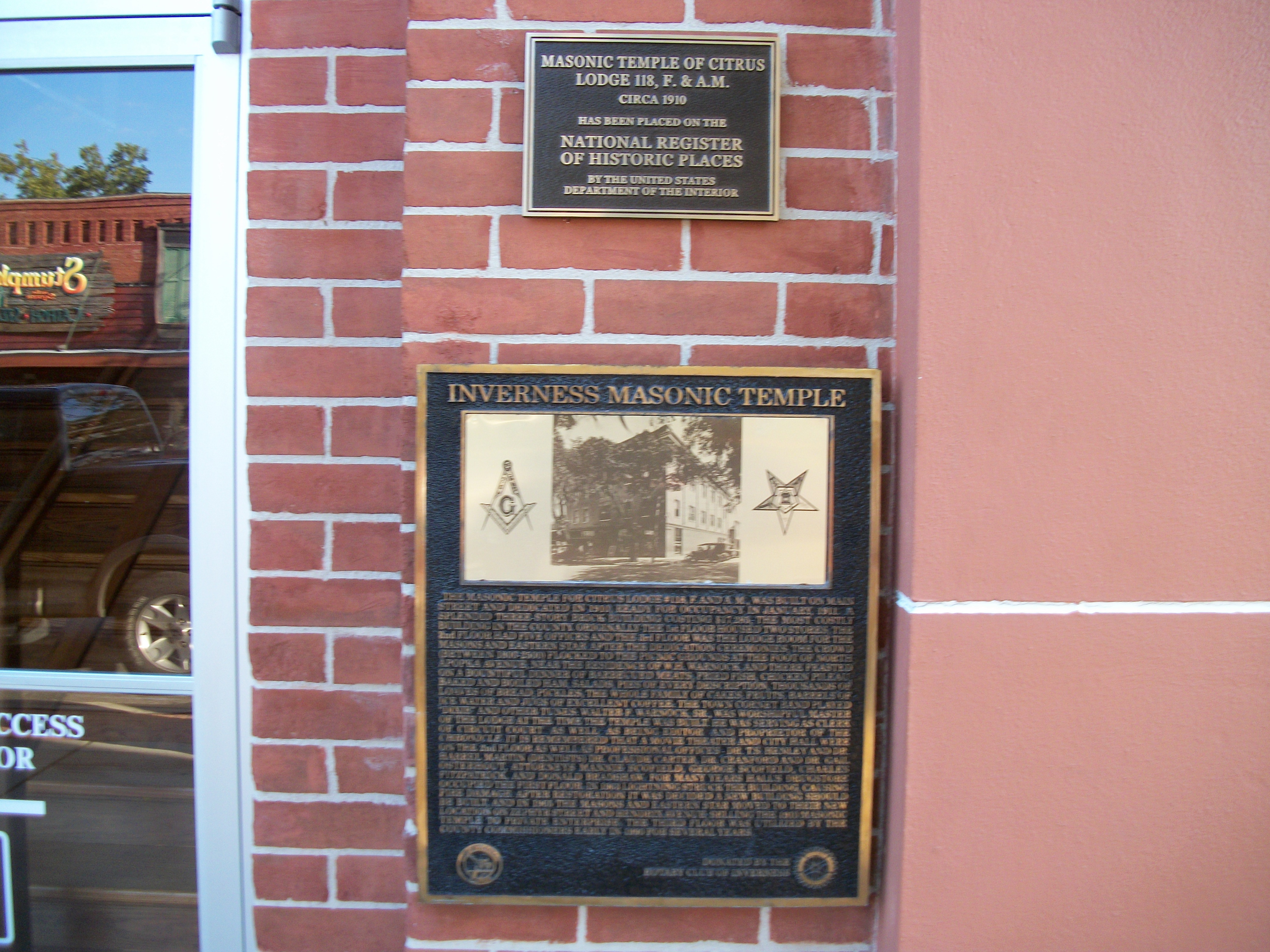
NRHP and city plaques on the building

The Masonic Temple of Citrus Lodge No. 118, F. and A.M. refers to a historic 3-story building designed by prominent Florida architect Wilbur B. Talley and built in 1910 at the corner of West Main Street (now Old Main Street) and South Pine Avenue in Inverness, Citrus County, Florida. It is also known as Inverness Masonic Temple. As was common with American Masonic buildings of the time, the first floor was used for retail stores, while the second floor was used for professional offices and the third floor was used for the lodge hall and other Masonic uses. Over the years, the second floor also housed the city hall and a movie theater. After repairing the fire damage from a lightning strike in 1963, Citrus Lodge decided to build a new building at 301 Hendrix Avenue and vacated the premises in 1965. The building was then sold to a series of private owners. In 1990 the Board of County Commissioners rented the third floor for a few years. Recent uses include the building management office on the ground floor, bookkeepers, attorneys, insurance agents, therapists, tutor services and an AA Intergroup office on the other floors.

In 1989, the Masonic Temple was listed in A Guide to Florida's Historic Architecture, published by the University of Florida Press. On October 20, 2000, the City of Inverness placed a commemorative plaque on the building. The building was purchased by the Drywell Group, LLC in 2006 and they proceeded to renovate and restore the interior and exterior. Wood floors and windows were refinished, period furniture, lighting, art, and paint colors were added throughout the building. The exterior brick was re-pointed or painted, windows were repaired and painted, and the metal cornice and Masonic sign were restored. A “history walk” of the building graces the first floor hall and a small exhibit about the building renovation/rehabilitation is on the second floor. During the rehabilitation, an application was submitted to the State of Florida for recognition of the Masonic Temple's historic status and on June 23, 2010, the building was added to the National Register of Historic Places. Today, the building is known as the "Masonic Business Center," and the first floor continues to be used for retail shops, among them a Subway submarine sandwich shop.
