= Duval County Armory =

Historic armory in Jacksonville, Florida

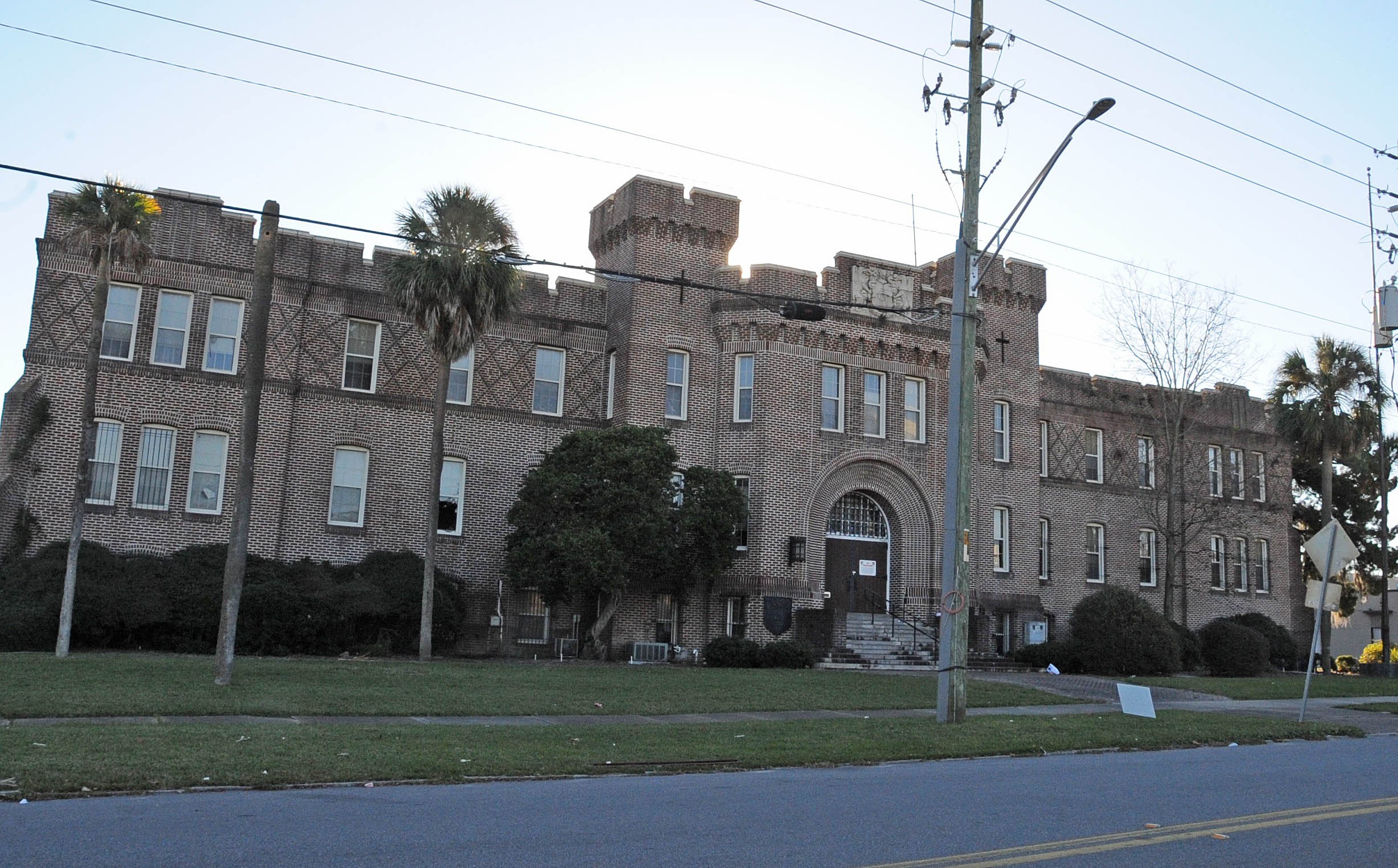

Duval County Armory is a gothic revival architecture former armory building in Jacksonville, Florida. It is listed on the National Register of Historic Places. Built in 1915 and 1916, Wilbur B. Talley was its architect. It is at 851 North Market Street. It is being redeveloped as an art hub and food hall.

The previous armory building burned in the 1901 fire. There is a photo of its ruins in the Florida Archives.

The 1916 armory had a swimming pool, bowling alley, riflery range, and hosted events. Basketball, boxing and wrestling competitions were held in its gym. It has been vacant since 2010. James Weldon Johnson wrote about his visit to the armory.

In 1962 it was renamed the Maxwell G. Snyder Armory. For a few years in the late 1970s, the city's parks department used the building.

In October 2025, a sale of the building to a developer was being considered.

== See also ==
- National Register of Historic Places listings in Duval County, Florida
