= National Register of Historic Places listings in Bay County, Florida =

Location of Bay County in Florida

This is a list of the National Register of Historic Places listings in Bay County, Florida.

This is intended to be a complete list of the properties on the National Register of Historic Places in Bay County, Florida, United States. The locations of National Register properties for which the latitude and longitude coordinates are included below, may be seen in a map.

There are 13 properties listed on the National Register in the county.

This National Park Service list is complete through NPS recent listings posted March 21, 2025.

Contents: Counties in Florida (non-linked contain no National Register listings)
Alachua - Baker - Bay - Bradford - Brevard - Broward - Calhoun - Charlotte - Citrus - Clay - Collier - Columbia - DeSoto - Dixie - Duval - Escambia - Flagler - Franklin - Gadsden - Gilchrist - Glades - Gulf - Hamilton - Hardee - Hendry - Hernando - Highlands - Hillsborough (Tampa) - Holmes - Indian River - Jackson - Jefferson - Lafayette - Lake - Lee - Leon - Levy - Liberty - Madison - Manatee - Marion - Martin - Miami-Dade (Miami) - Monroe - Nassau - Okaloosa - Okeechobee - Orange - Osceola - Palm Beach - Pasco - Pinellas - Polk - Putnam - St. Johns - St. Lucie - Santa Rosa - Sarasota - Seminole - Sumter - Suwannee - Taylor - Union - Volusia - Wakulla - Walton - Washington

== Current listings ==
	Name on the Register	Image	Date listed	Location	City or town	Description
1	Camp Helen Historic District	Camp Helen Historic District	May 24, 2012 (#12000298)	23937 Panama City Beach Pkwy. 30°16′21″N 85°59′35″W	Panama City Beach	
2	GOVERNOR STONE (schooner)	GOVERNOR STONE (schooner)	December 4, 1991 (#91002063)	Bayview Ave. 30°10′03″N 85°42′09″W	Panama City	Was in Walton County at the time it was added to NRHP.
3	Latimer Cabin	Latimer Cabin	September 15, 2004 (#04000972)	Northeast Powell Lake; 30°16′45″N 85°59′09″W	Panama City Beach	
4	Robert L. McKenzie House	Robert L. McKenzie House	August 21, 1986 (#86001728)	17 East Third Court; 30°09′15″N 85°39′38″W	Panama City	
5	Panama City Publishing Company Building	Panama City Publishing Company Building	July 20, 2021 (#100006752)	1134 Beck Ave. 30°10′09″N 85°42′05″W	Panama City	
6	Panama Grammar School	Panama Grammar School	January 21, 2020 (#100004888)	101 East Seventh St. 30°09′40″N 85°39′35″W	Panama City	
7	A. A. Payne–John Christo Sr. House	A. A. Payne–John Christo Sr. House	July 16, 2008 (#08000671)	940 West Beach Drive; 30°09′39″N 85°40′24″W	Panama City	
8	St. Andrew School	St. Andrew School	August 14, 1997 (#97000839)	3001 West 15th Street; 30°10′31″N 85°42′06″W	Panama City	
9	Sapp House	Sapp House	October 4, 2003 (#03000991)	224 Third Court; 30°09′13″N 85°39′30″W	Panama City	
10	Schmidt-Godert Farm	Schmidt-Godert Farm	October 4, 2002 (#02001083)	100 State Road 2297; 30°08′48″N 85°30′02″W	Panama City	
11	Sherman Arcade	Sherman Arcade	September 9, 1998 (#98001155)	228 Harrison Avenue; 30°09′16″N 85°39′39″W	Panama City	
12	SS Tarpon (shipwreck)	SS Tarpon (shipwreck)	May 31, 2001 (#01000527)	7.8 nautical miles (14.4 km) offshore Panama City; 30°07′24″N 85°56′45″W	Panama City	
13	Vamar Shipwreck Site	Vamar Shipwreck Site	April 10, 2006 (#06000243)	3.7 miles (6.0 km) offshore Mexico Beach; 29°53′53″N 85°27′47″W	Mexico Beach	

== See also ==
- List of National Historic Landmarks in Florida
- National Register of Historic Places listings in Florida
