= Schmidt House =

Schmidt House may refer to:

in the United States

(by state)

- George Schmidt House, Denver, Colorado, listed on the NRHP in Colorado
- Schmidt-Godert Farm, Panama City, Florida, NRHP-listed
- The Propylaeum (John W. Schmidt House), Indianapolis, Indiana, NRHP-listed
- Louis C. and Amelia L. Schmidt House, Davenport, Iowa, NRHP-listed
- Schmidt Block, Davenport, Iowa, NRHP-listed
- F. Jacob Schmidt House, Davenport, Iowa, NRHP-listed
- Westphal-Schmidt House, Davenport, Iowa, NRHP-listed
- Schmidt House (Elkader, Iowa), NRHP-listed
- Mueller-Schmidt House, Dodge City, Kansas, listed on the NRHP in Kansas
- Carl E. and Alice Candler Schmidt House, Grosse Pointe Farms, Michigan, NRHP-listed
- Clara and Julius Schmidt House, Wabasha, Minnesota, NRHP-listed
- Schmidt House (Florissant, Missouri), listed on the NRHP in Missouri
- Charles J. and Clara B. Schmidt House, Jefferson City, Missouri, NRHP-listed
- Albert Schmidt House and Studio, Tesuque, New Mexico, listed on the NRHP in New Mexico
- Millen-Schmidt House, Xenia, Ohio, NRHP-listed
- Claus and Hannchen Schmidt House, Grants Pass, Oregon, listed on the NRHP in Oregon
- Poth and Schmidt Development Houses, Philadelphia, Pennsylvania, NRHP-listed
- Schmidt House (Brenhamm, Texas), listed on the NRHP in Texas
- F. W. Schmidt House, Olympia, Washington, listed on the NRHP in Washington
- Christian Schmidt House, Waterville, Washington, listed on the NRHP in Washington
