= Robert Lee McKenzie =

American politician

Robert Lee McKenzie (October 16, 1870 – December 13, 1956) was an entrepreneur, a real estate developer, a founder and first mayor of Panama City, Florida, and an instrumental figure in the early history of Bob Jones University.

== Biography ==
=== Business and political career ===
McKenzie was born and reared on a farm in Macon County, Georgia. Following graduation from high school, he owned and operated a general store.

In 1902 McKenzie moved to the Florida Panhandle and became joint owner of a naval stores business with 75 employees. McKenzie was the first in the area to use the innovative and less wasteful “turpentine cup” method for collecting pine tree resin. In 1904 McKenzie purchased waterfront property on St. Andrews Bay and cooperated with other businessmen in developing the town that they called Panama City with the aspiration that it become a port of entry for goods arriving via the planned Panama Canal.

After Panama City was incorporated in 1909, McKenzie was elected the first mayor. He also served two terms (1909-1913) as a representative from Washington County in the Florida House of Representatives. In 1913, McKenzie succeeded in his efforts to have Panama City named the seat of Bay County, which he had also helped to create. During World War II, McKenzie served as Chairman of the Bay County Chapter of the Red Cross (1941–44) and as a member of the Selective Service Board (1940–47).

=== Supporter of Bob Jones University ===
McKenzie met Methodist evangelist Bob Jones during a 1919 tent-meeting campaign in Panama City. In the fall of 1925, after Jones decided to start a college in the area, he asked McKenzie for suggestions about possible locations and eventually chose a 2,500-acre peninsula on the bay, eight miles from Panama City and two miles from the hamlet of Lynn Haven. The Bob Jones College charter was signed in the office at his home. After the college opened in 1927, McKenzie served on the Executive Board for the remainder of his life. The current Bob Jones University Dining Common is named “Dixon-McKenzie” in honor of McKenzie, his wife, and his wife’s sister, Mary Dixon, all of whom were financial supporters of the school. Bob Jones College was relocated from Florida first to Cleveland, Tennessee, and then in 1947 to Greenville, South Carolina, where it was renamed Bob Jones University.

=== Personal life ===
R. L. McKenzie was a charter member of the First Baptist Church of Panama City and later transferred his membership to the Cove Baptist Church. In 1912, McKenzie married Belle Booth, the Panama City postmistress, who had built a house at 17 E. Third Street after the death of her husband, Dr. Charles Booth. Following Belle’s death, McKenzie married Blandford Dixon, a schoolteacher twenty-four years his junior; and he had two daughters by his second marriage. In 1925 McKenzie enlarged the house, and many business and municipal meetings were held there.

In 1964, Panama City recognized McKenzie’s service to the community by renaming its city park, McKenzie Park. In 1986, his house, across from the park, was listed on the National Register of Historic Places.

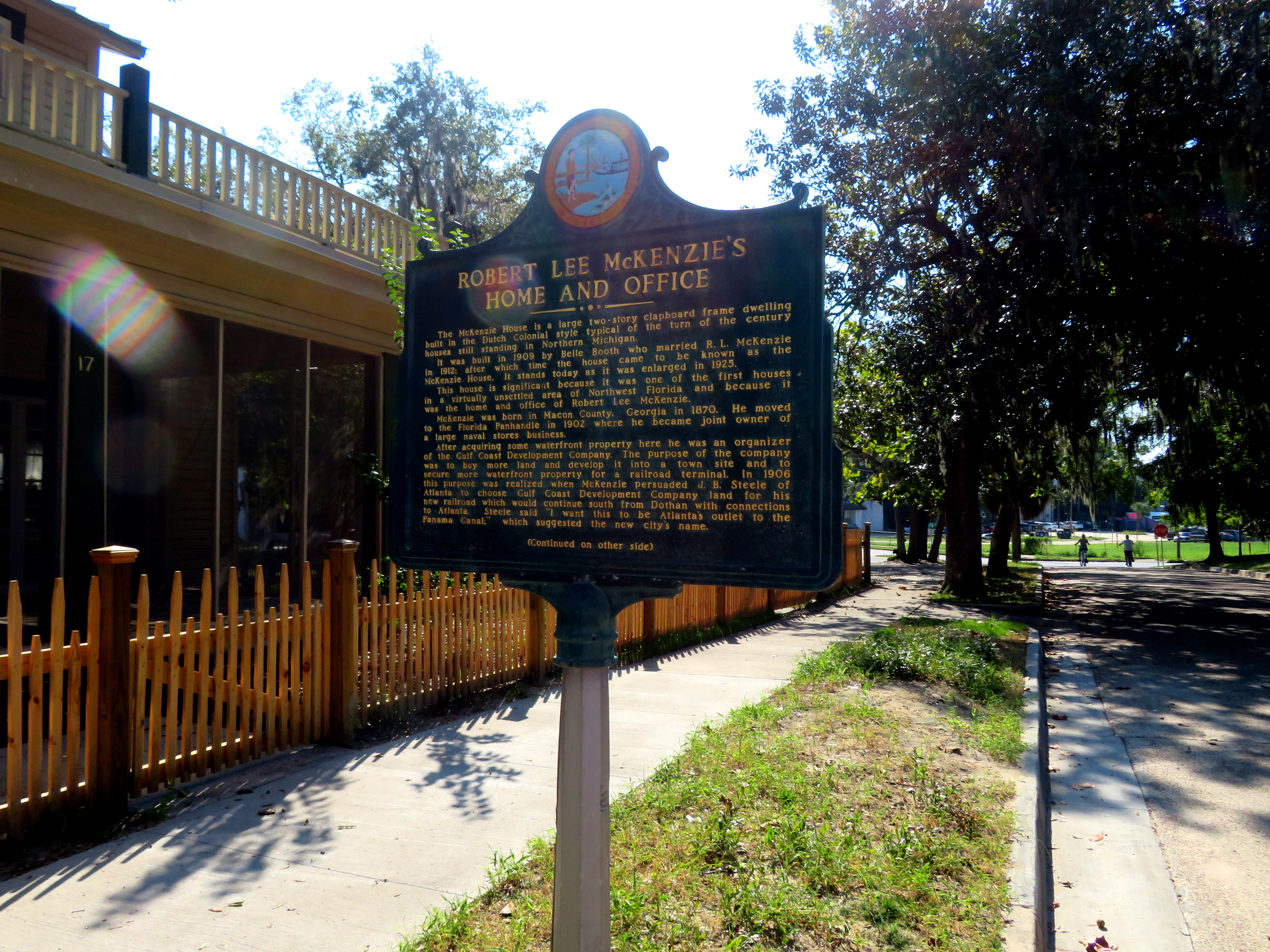

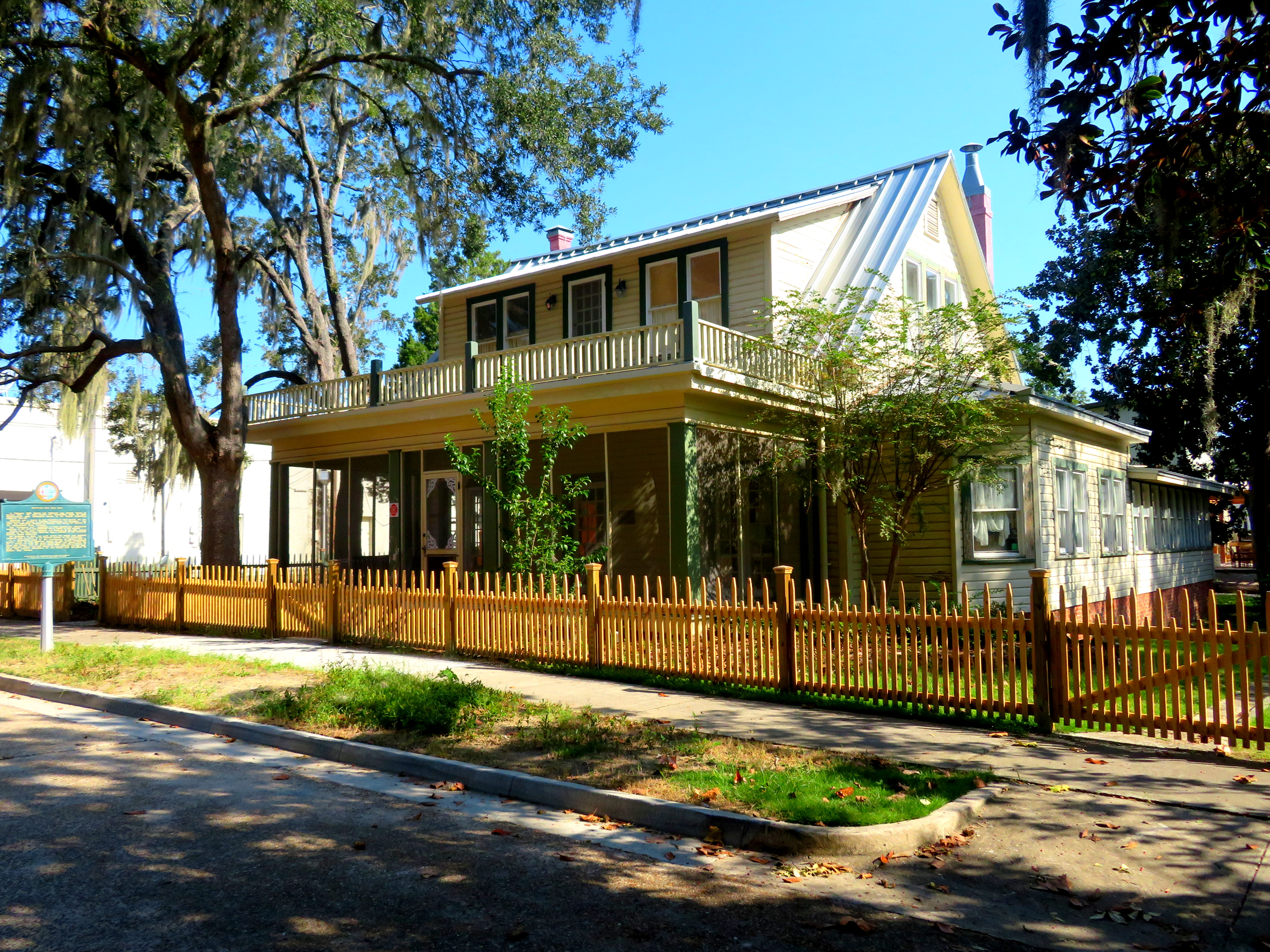

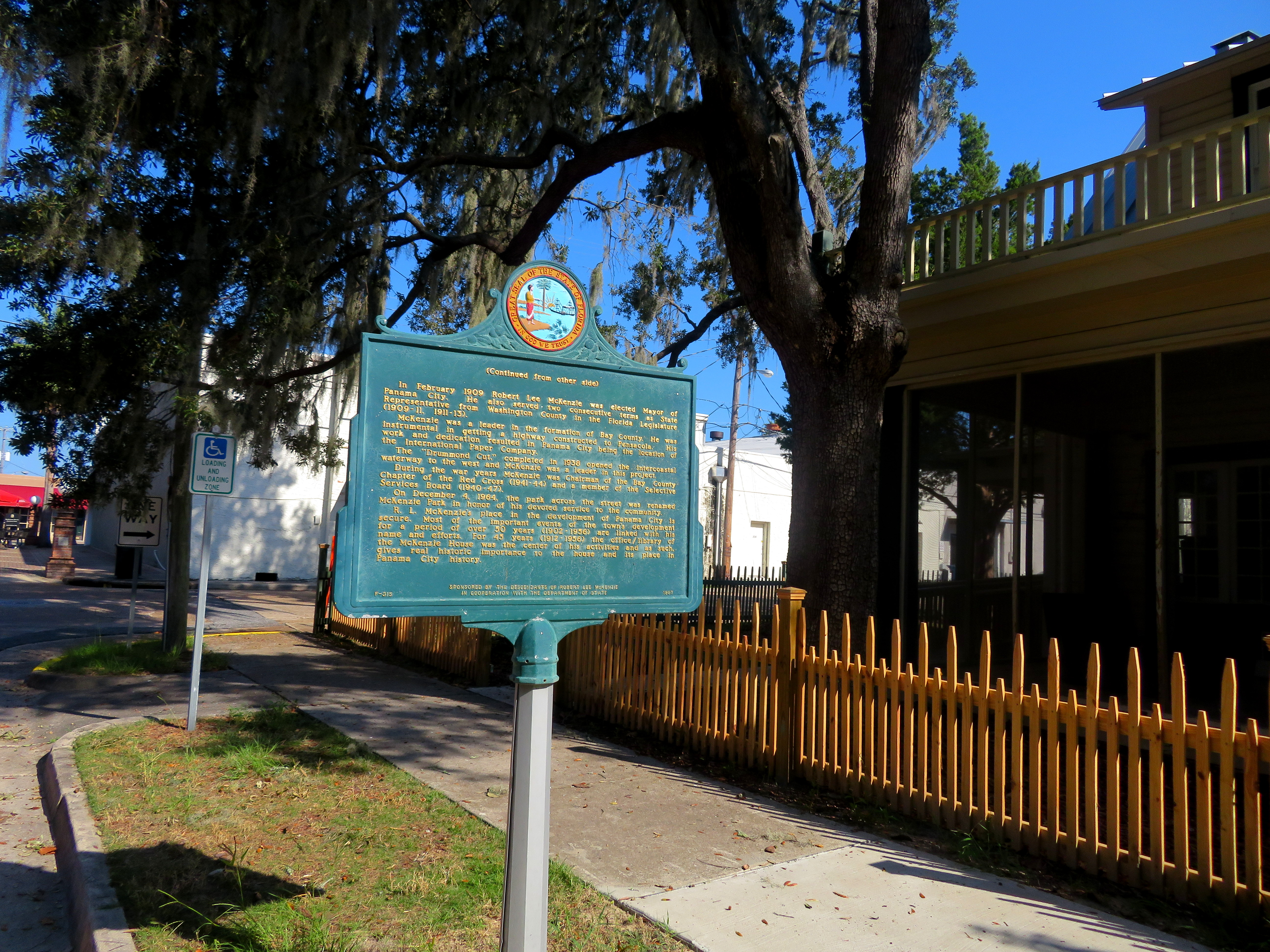
