= Governor Stone (schooner) =

19th-century American schooner

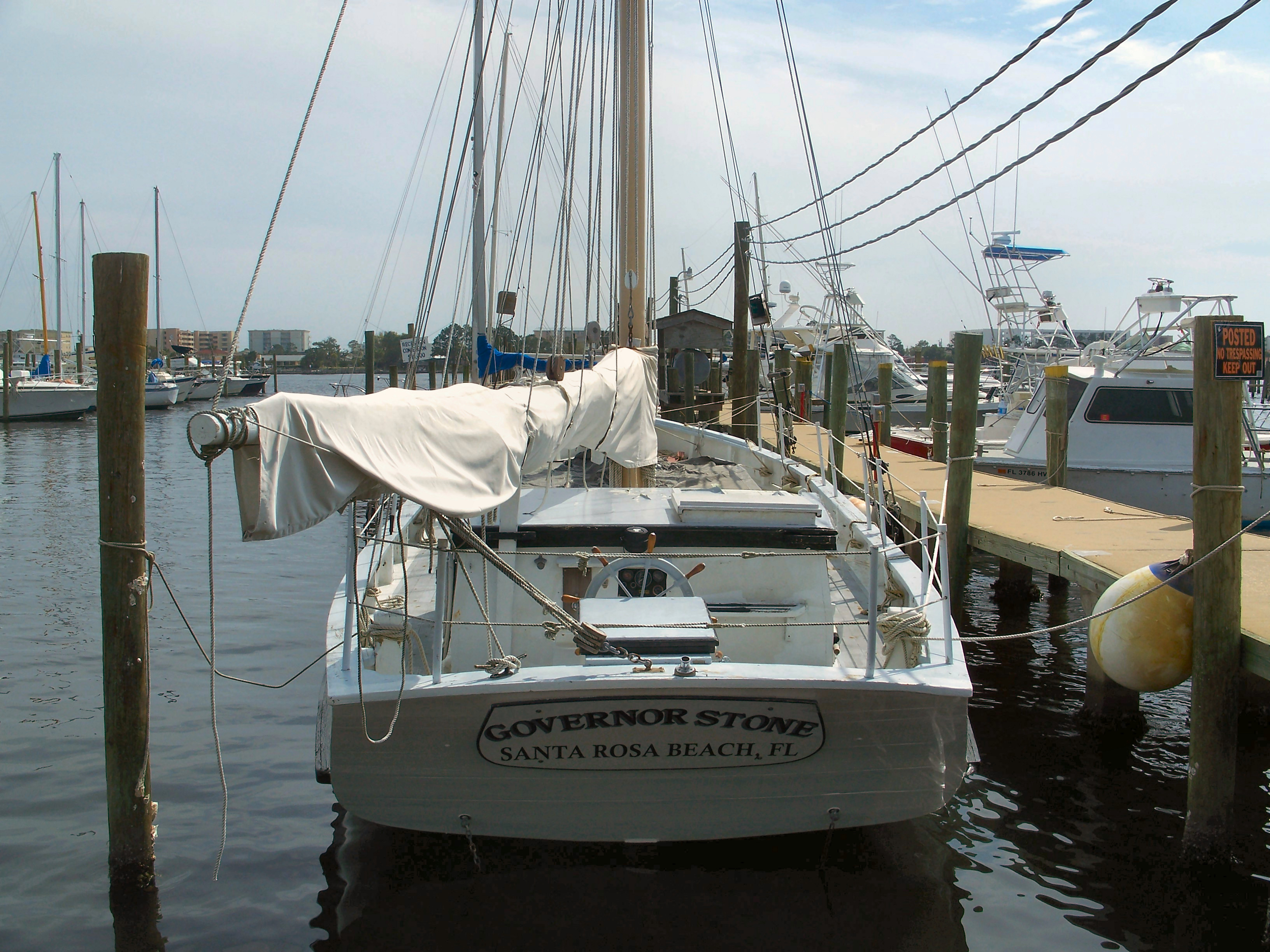

History

United States
- Name: Governor Stone
- Launched: 1877 in Pascagoula, Mississippi
- Fate: Capsized during Hurricane Michael, 10 October 2018
- Status: Currently undergoing restoration by Stone Loft Boat Shop

General characteristics
- Tonnage: 14.6 GRT 12 NRT
- Length: 39.0 ft (11.9 m) (on deck); 66 ft (20 m) (LOA)
- Beam: 12.6 ft (3.8 m)
- Draft: 3.9 ft (1.2 m)
- Depth of hold: 3.3 ft (1.0 m)
- Sail plan: Schooner
- Governor Stone (schooner)
- U.S. National Register of Historic Places
- U.S. National Historic Landmark
- Location within Florida Location within the United States
- Location: Panama City, Florida, US
- Coordinates: 30°10′03.1″N 85°42′09.4″W
- Area: less than one acre
- Built: 1877
- NRHP reference No.: 91002063

Significant dates
- Added to NRHP: 4 December 1991
- Designated NHL: 4 December 1992

Governor Stone is a historic schooner, built in 1877 in Pascagoula, Mississippi, United States. She is the only surviving two-masted coasting cargo schooner built on the Gulf Coast of the United States, and is only one of five such surviving US-built ships. On 4 December 1991, she was added to the US National Register of Historic Places. One year later, the schooner was designated a US National Historic Landmark. She is presently berthed at Saint Andrews Marina in Panama City, Florida, where she is maintained by a nonprofit group. Sailing tours are regularly scheduled.

== Description ==
Governor Stone has a wooden hull, 39 feet (12 m) long, with a beam of 12.6 feet (3.8 m) and a hold depth of 3.3 feet (1.0 m). She has a pine keel, a frame of cypress, and decking and other finished surfaces of pine and juniper. Her two masts are pine, one 38.8 feet (11.8 m) in length and the other 39.8 feet (12.1 m), which is fitted with a topmast giving it a total height of 52 feet (16 m). The basic design of the vessel is described as typical of late-19th-century Gulf schooners. She has a poop deck with a small cabin, and the rest of her deck is divided into hatches providing access to the hold area.

== History ==
Governor Stone was built in Pascagoula in 1877 for Charles Greiner, a merchant, and was named for John Marshall Stone, who was Governor of Mississippi at the time. Greiner owned a chandlery in Pascagoula, and used her to bring supplies and materials to deep-water ships outside the harbor. Subsequent owners used her as a buyboat, purchasing oyster catch from working fishermen and bringing it to shore. In 1906 she was capsized during a hurricane and washed inland, but was successfully refloated. She also sank during a storm at Bay St. Louis, Mississippi in 1939, but was again recovered. Renamed Queen of the Fleet, she entered into the tourist trade, carrying visitors on excursions at DeLisle, Mississippi. During World War II she was converted for use as a training vessel by the Merchant Marine Academy. After going through a succession of owners (and names) in the post-war years, she was given a careful restoration in the 1960s and 1970s.

She became part of Eden Gardens State Park in 2003. However, the water in Tucker Bayou next to the park was too shallow for the boat to dock there. She was in Sandestin for a short time, then moved to Bay County. In 2007, the schooner was towed to a marina in Fort Walton Beach. In 2014, it was moved to its current home port at the St. Andrews Marina in the historic area of St. Andrews, Panama City, Florida.

In October 2018, Governor Stone capsized at her dock during Hurricane Michael. The Friends of the Governor Stone organization has raised funds to salvage and repair her. She was later raised and stored ashore. Rebuilding was to start in May/June 2022 at Stone Loft Boat Inc., St. Andrews, Florida, with an ending date projected for 2024.

== See also ==
- List of schooners
- List of National Historic Landmarks in Florida
- National Register of Historic Places listings in Bay County, Florida
