= Schmidt Block =

- U.S. National Register of Historic Places
- U.S. Historic district – Contributing property
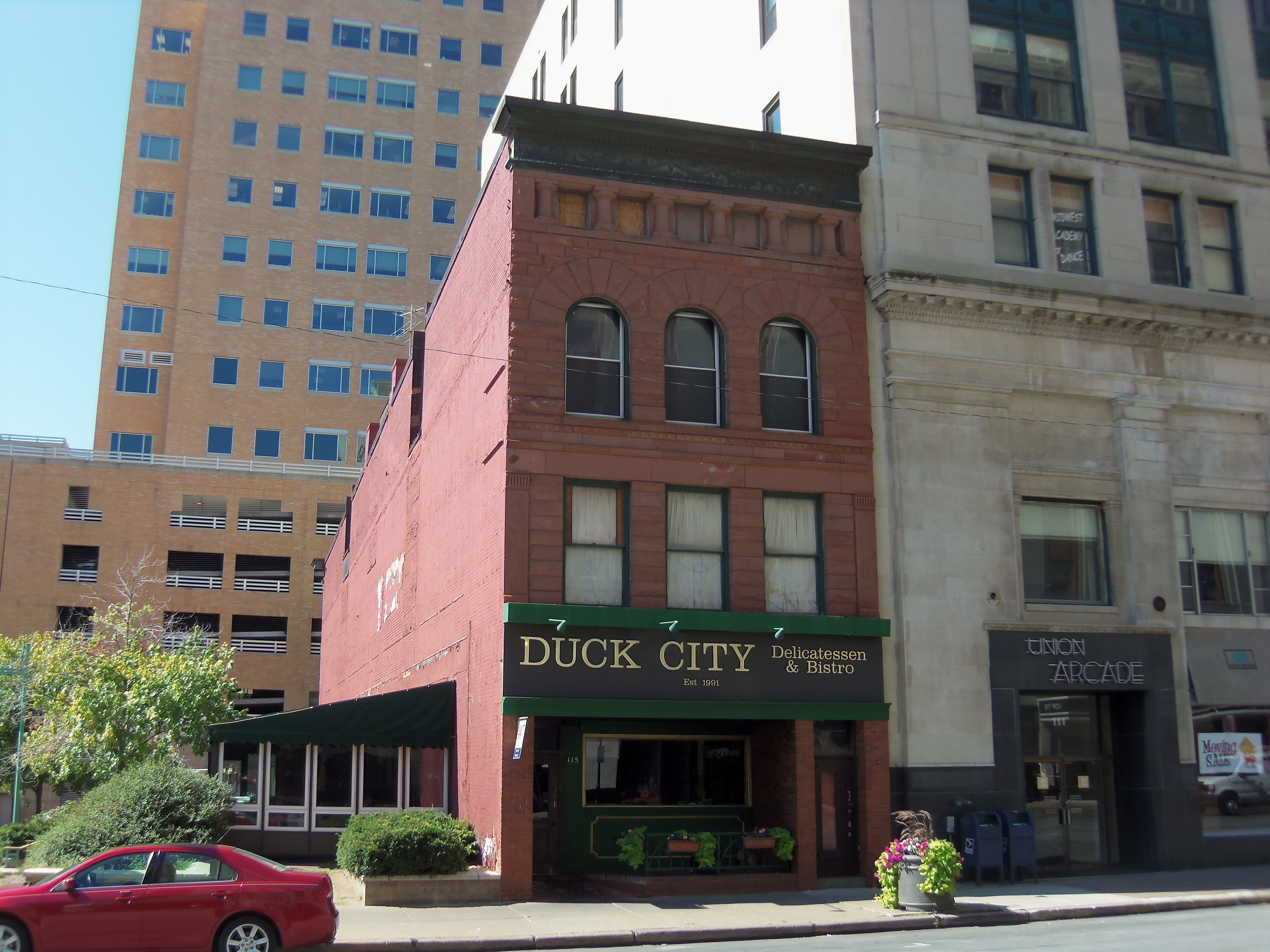

- Location within Iowa Location within the United States
- Location: 115 E. 3rd St. Davenport, Iowa
- Coordinates: 41°31′20″N 90°36′38″W
- Area: less than one acre
- Built: 1896
- Architectural style: Romanesque
- Part of: Davenport Downtown Commercial Historic District (ID100005546)
- MPS: Davenport MRA
- NRHP reference No.: 83002498
- Added to NRHP: July 7, 1983

The Schmidt Block , also known as the F.T. Schmidt Building, is a historic building located in downtown Davenport, Iowa, United States. It was individually listed on the National Register of Historic Places in 1983. In 2020 it was included as a contributing property in the Davenport Downtown Commercial Historic District.

== History ==
The building was built by Fritz T. Schmidt in 1896 to house his wine and liquor business, which was known as Fritz T. Schmidt and Sons. They produced their own wine at a west end location known as "Blackhawk Vineyards." It was located along Blackhawk Creek. Some of the buildings, including the Schmidt's house, are extant. During Prohibition the family moved into real estate and insurance. In the late 1970s and 1980s the building housed an upscale restaurant called J.K. Frizbee's. Duck City, another upscale restaurant, occupies the building now.

== Architecture ==
The Schmidt Block is a three-plus story building constructed of red stone that was built on a brick foundation. The main façade was designed in the Romanesque Revival style made popular by Henry Hobson Richardson. It features large round-arched windows with tuned-stone surrounds on the third floor, roughly dressed stone, and stunted columns on the attic level arcade that are topped by a cornice. The Schmidt Block is the only commercial building in Davenport to adopt the Richardsonian Romanesque style in stone. The swag embellishments on the frieze are also unique in that they are Adamesque rather than Romanesque. While the storefront has been modernized, the building retains its recessed entrance into the first-floor commercial space and transom signage. The building immediately to the east has since been torn down and a sheltered outdoor seating area for the restaurant has been added that looks over the urban style park that sits between the Schmidt Block and the RiverCenter, the city's convention center.
