= F. Jacob Schmidt House =

Historic house in Iowa, United States

- U.S. National Register of Historic Places
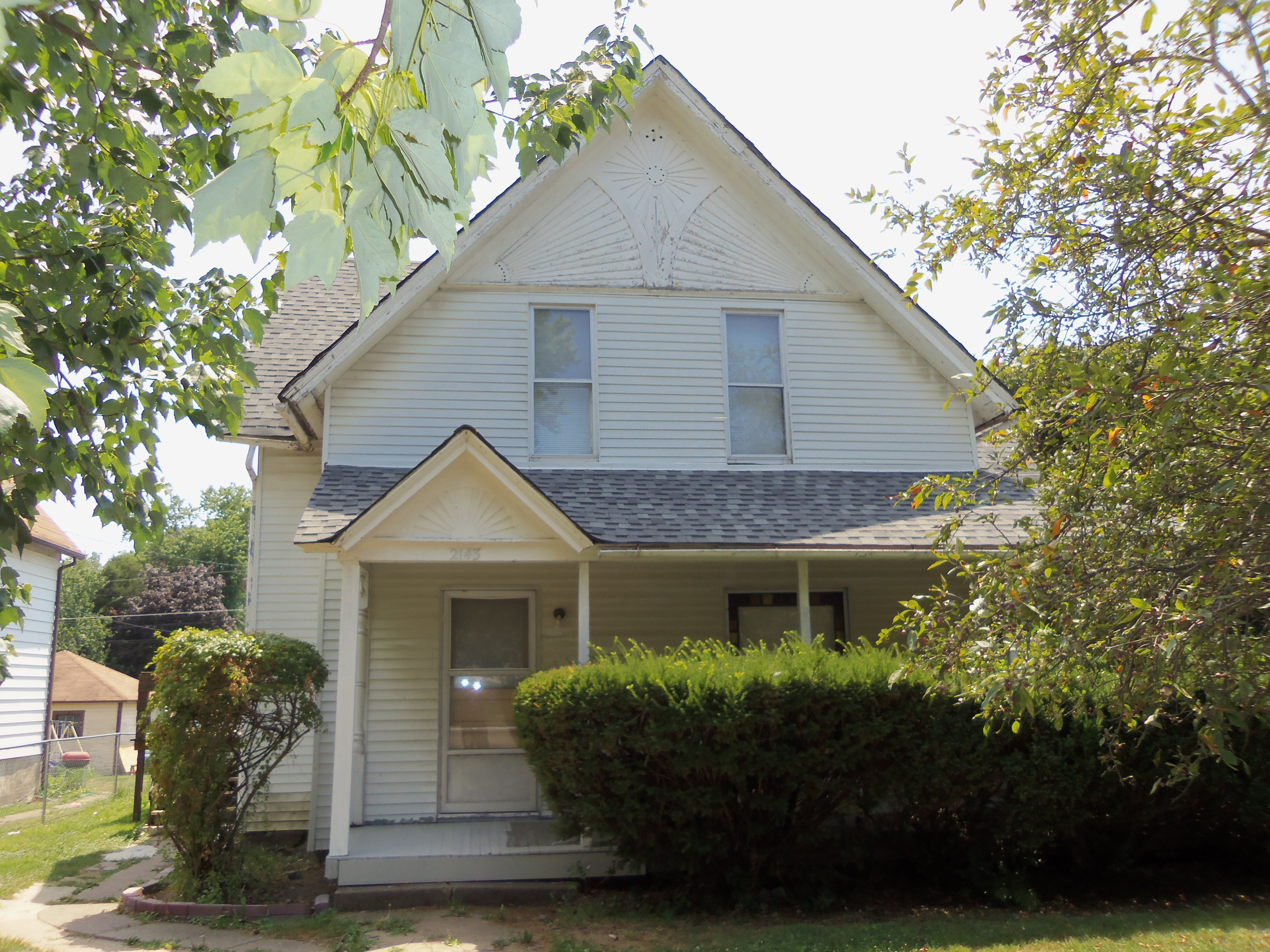

- Location within Iowa Location within the United States
- Location: 2143 and 2147 W. 5th St., Davenport, Iowa
- Coordinates: 41°31′27″N 90°36′38″W
- Area: less than one acre
- Built: 1890
- Architectural style: Queen Anne
- MPS: Davenport MRA
- NRHP reference No.: 83002499
- Added to NRHP: July 7, 1983

The F. Jacob Schmidt House is a historic building located in the West End of Davenport, Iowa, United States. F. Jacob Schmidt, who built this house, worked as a cooper. This Queen Anne style house was possibly ordered from a Victorian pattern book. It is a 1½-story structure with a projecting side pavilion. Its noteworthy feature is the sunburst pattern on the main gable. The Eastlake style porch has subsequently been replaced with one of a more simple design. The house has been listed on the National Register of Historic Places since 1983.
