= Louis C. and Amelia L. Schmidt House =

Historic house in Iowa, United States

- U.S. National Register of Historic Places
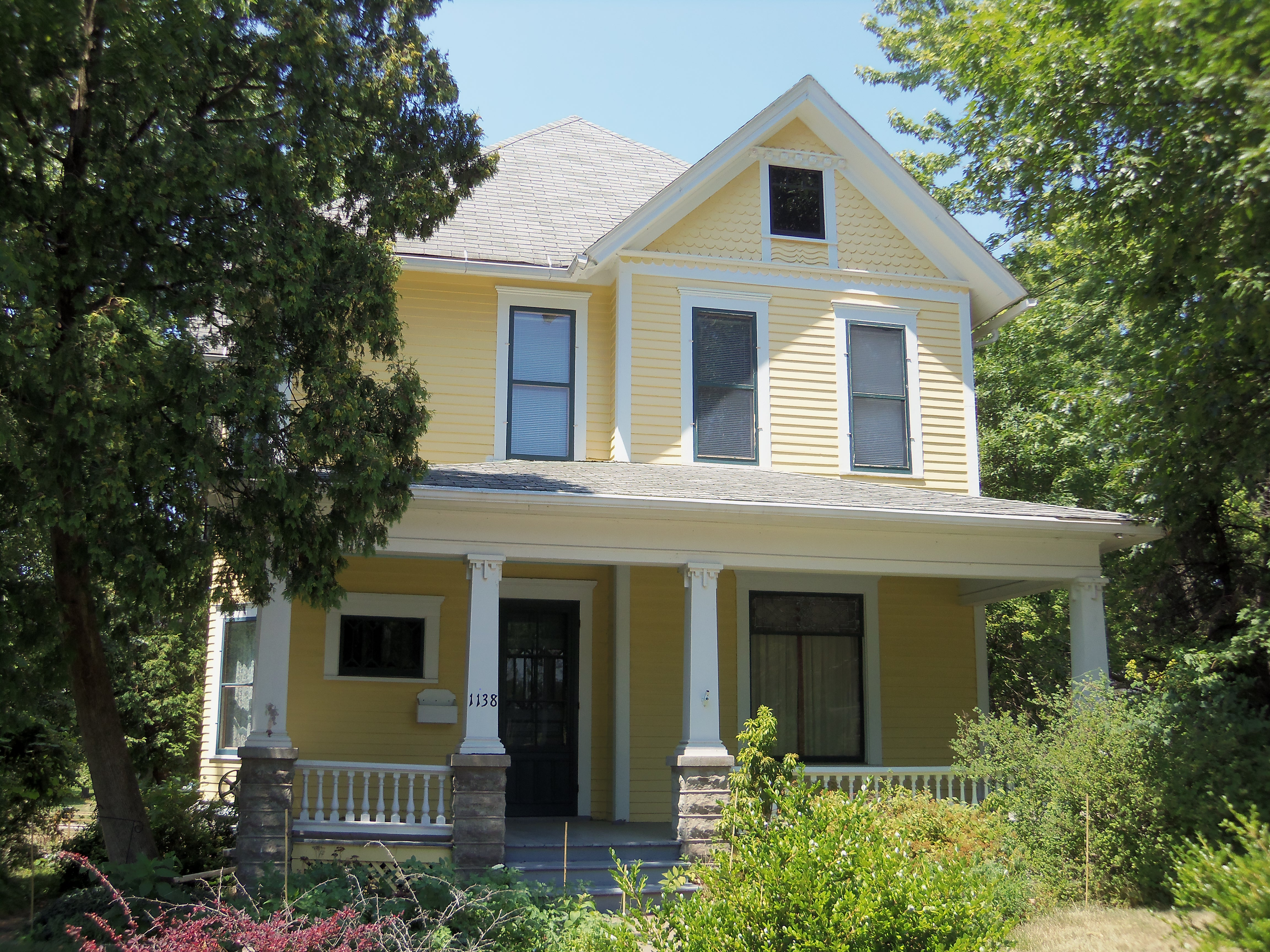

- Location within Iowa Location within the United States
- Location: 1138 Oneida Ave. Davenport, Iowa
- Coordinates: 41°31′55.81″N 90°33′34.01″W
- Built: 1895
- Built by: Louis Schmidt
- Architectural style: Queen Anne
- NRHP reference No.: 07000407
- Added to NRHP: May 8, 2007

The Louis C. and Amelia L. Schmidt House is a historic building located in a residential neighborhood on the east side of Davenport, Iowa, United States. It was listed on the National Register of Historic Places in 2007.

== History ==
Louis Schmidt was born in East Davenport in 1860 and was educated in the local public schools. He attended a Davenport business college and worked as a carpenter and contractor. Schmidt was a member of Carpenter's Union No. 4 and worked initially in a partnership with John H. Bertram as Schmidt & Bertram. Amelia L. Huschke was born near Davenport in 1866. The couple was married on November 26, 1889, at St. Margaret's Cathedral, and they lived in a house on Bridge Avenue with their three children. They bought this property in 1891 and he built this house in 1895. The house served as the family's residence and as the base for Louis' business. The Schmidts lived in this house until the 1940s. Louis died in 1942 at 81 and Amelia died in 1957 at 91. She had outlived her four children. Amelia had sold the house in 1947 to Ruth Burchell, an antiques dealer. Burchell, who was single, lived here with George A. and Mabel Burchell, and Robert L. Burchell who worked as a furniture refinisher.

Ernest and Inez Enge bought the house in 1950. He worked for the Davenport, Rock Island, and North Western Railroad. They sold the southern portion of the property to Mary E. Hootman in 1953. Inez died in 1976 at the age 85, and Ernest and his daughter Inez continued to live in the house. He transferred the title of the property to his children in 1980 and continued to live here until at least 1983. Ernest died in 1987 at the age of 99 at his son's home in Canton, Illinois. The house was rented to Joseph and Elaine Sheil from 1984 to 1989. Tina Burroughs, a realtor, bought the house in 1989 and lived here until 1991. Raymond, a biologist at Scott Community College, and Cheryl Reeves lived here from 1991 to 1996. They sold the property to Jolene M. Boddorf, who worked at the Rock Island Arsenal in 1996 and she sold it to William and Rebecca McCarley in 2003.

== Architecture ==
The Schmidt House is a fine example of a Queen Anne style home that was popular in Davenport in the 1890s. It is typical of the simplified, middle-class interpretation of the style. It is a two-story, frame structure with a hip roof, lower projecting gables, and an irregular form. There is a front projecting gable-roof section and gable roofs extend over the two-story angled bay windows on the north and south elevations of the structure. A gable-roof section also extends from the back of the main hip-roof in the rear of the house. The gables feature fish scale wood shingles, carved boards, dentils, beads, and multi-light windows. The side porch at the rear of the house has turned columns, pilasters, and balustrade with decorative carved brackets. The large window on the front of the house features a leaded color transom. The stair window is a common style utilized in Queen Anne houses.

The front porch is the only major exterior change to the Schmidt House. The house was originally built with a side porch, but no front porch. It was added sometime in the 1910s or the 1920s in the American Craftsman style. It features wide eaves, tapered square columns that rest on rusticated concrete block piers, and a wooden balustrade.
