= Sapp House =

Historic house in Florida, United States

- U.S. National Register of Historic Places
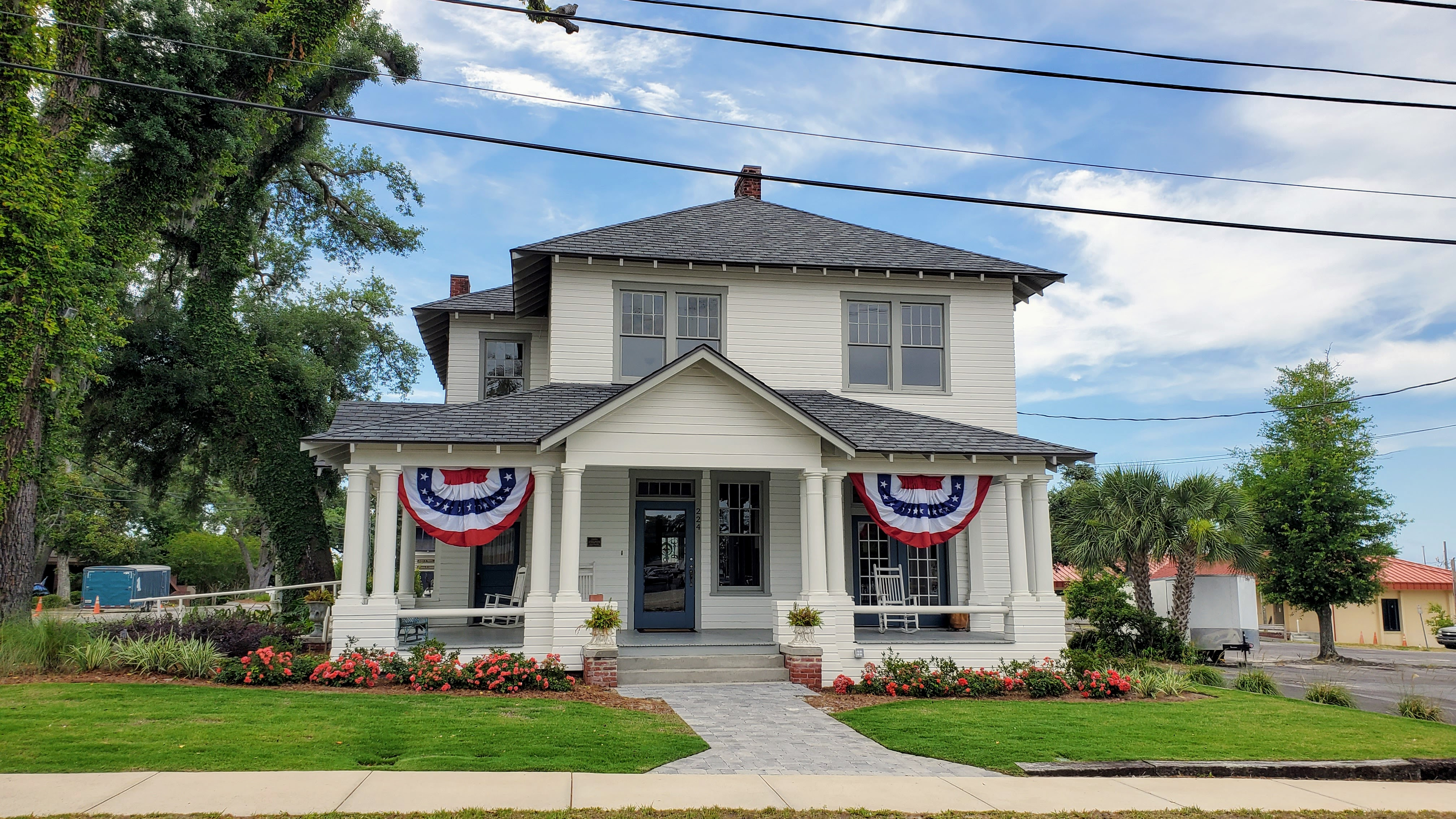
- June 2021

- Location within Florida Location within the United States
- Location: Panama City, Florida
- Coordinates: 30°9′13″N 85°39′30″W
- NRHP reference No.: 03000991
- Added to NRHP: October 4, 2003

The Sapp House is a historic site in Panama City, Florida. It is located at 224 3rd Court. On October 4, 2003, it was added to the U.S. National Register of Historic Places.

== History ==
The house was built by Sapp family. In 1912, Joshua Mercer Sapp (1878-1971) relocated to Panama City from Washington County, becoming a partner in Judge J. R. Wells's law firm. Accompanying him was his newlywed wife, Ella Mae Patton, originally from Apalachicola. Together, they raised two sons, Herbert Patton and Howard William.
