= Latimer Cabin =

- U.S. National Register of Historic Places
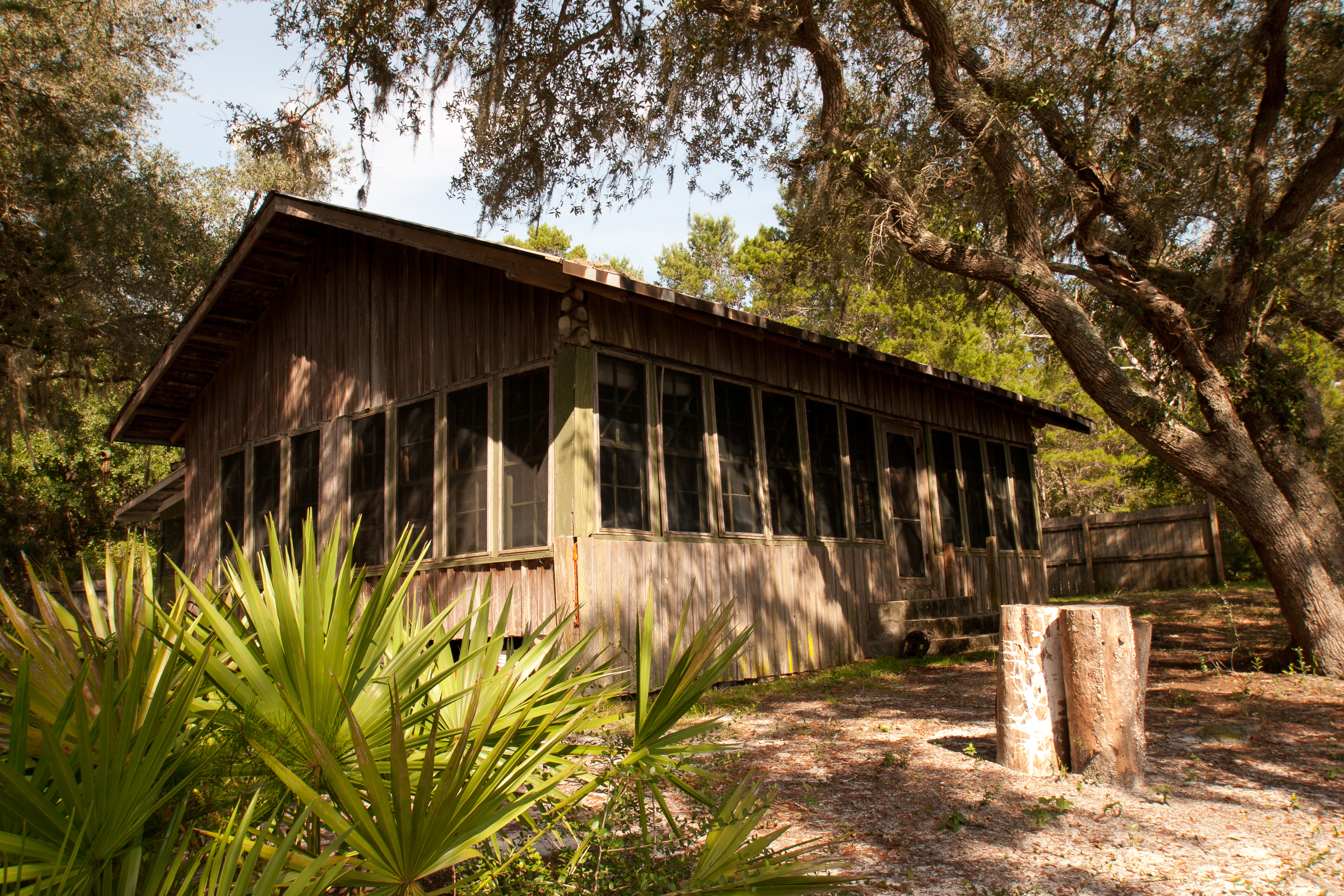

- Location within Florida Location within the United States
- Location: Panama City Beach, Florida
- Coordinates: 30°16′45″N 85°59′9″W
- NRHP reference No.: 04000972
- Added to NRHP: September 15, 2004

The Latimer Cabin is a historic site in Panama City Beach, Florida. It is located at the northeast shore of Powell Lake. On September 15, 2004, it was added to the U.S. National Register of Historic Places.
