= St. Andrew School =

- U.S. National Register of Historic Places
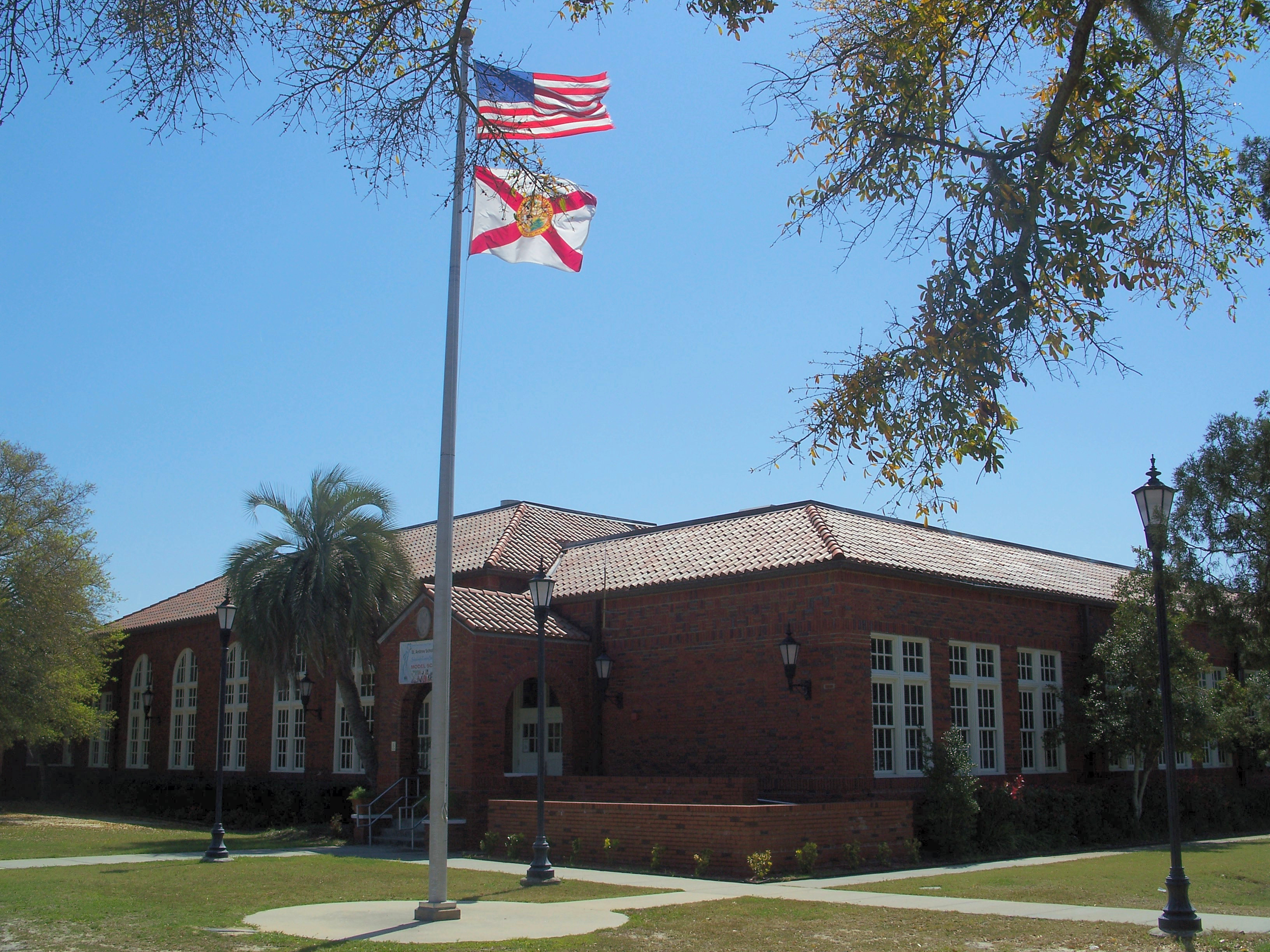

- Location within Florida Location within the United States
- Location: Panama City, Florida
- Coordinates: 30°10′29″N 85°42′9″W
- Architectural style: Late Gothic Revival, Stick-Eastlake
- NRHP reference No.: 97000839
- Added to NRHP: August 14, 1997

The St. Andrew School (also known as the St. Andrew Grammar School) is a historic site in Panama City, Florida. It is located at 3001 West 15th Street. On August 14, 1997, it was added to the U.S. National Register of Historic Places. It was constructed in 1926 and served as a Bay County school until Hurricane Michael left the school beyond a financially profitable state of disrepair. In 2021, the city proposed turning the facility into a community center.
