= A. A. Payne–John Christo Sr. House =

Historic house in Florida, United States

- U.S. National Register of Historic Places
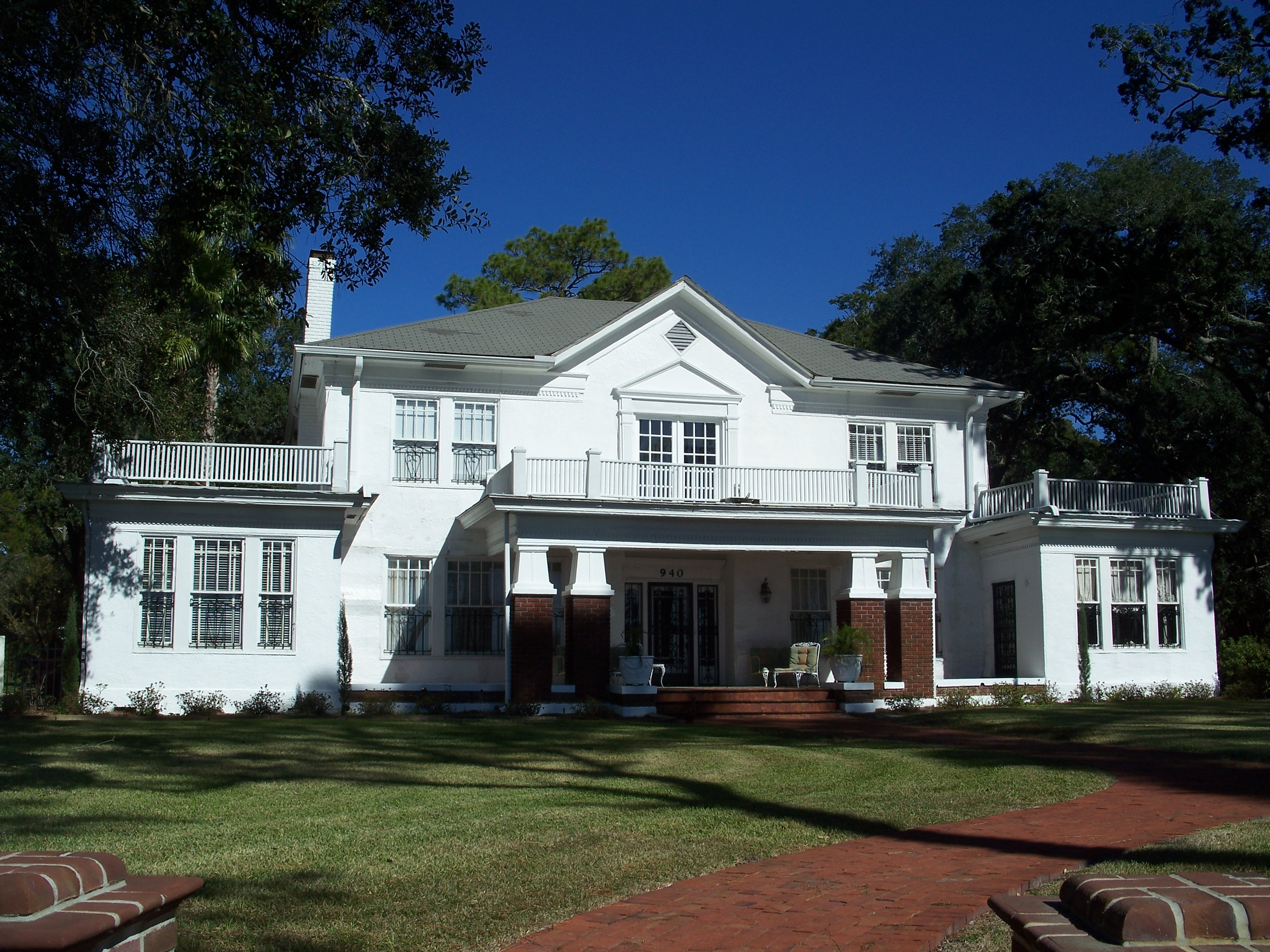

- Location within Florida Location within the United States
- Location: 940 West Beach Dr., Panama City, Florida
- Coordinates: 30°9′39.2″N 85°40′24.3″W
- Area: 1.2 acres (0.49 ha)
- Architectural style: Colonial Revival
- NRHP reference No.: 08000671
- Added to NRHP: July 16, 2008

The A. A. Payne–John Christo Sr. House is a historic house at 940 West Beach Drive in Panama City, Florida.

== Description and history ==
On July 16, 2008, it was added to the U.S. National Register of Historic Places.

It is also known as FMSF#BY451.
