= Sherman Arcade =

- U.S. National Register of Historic Places
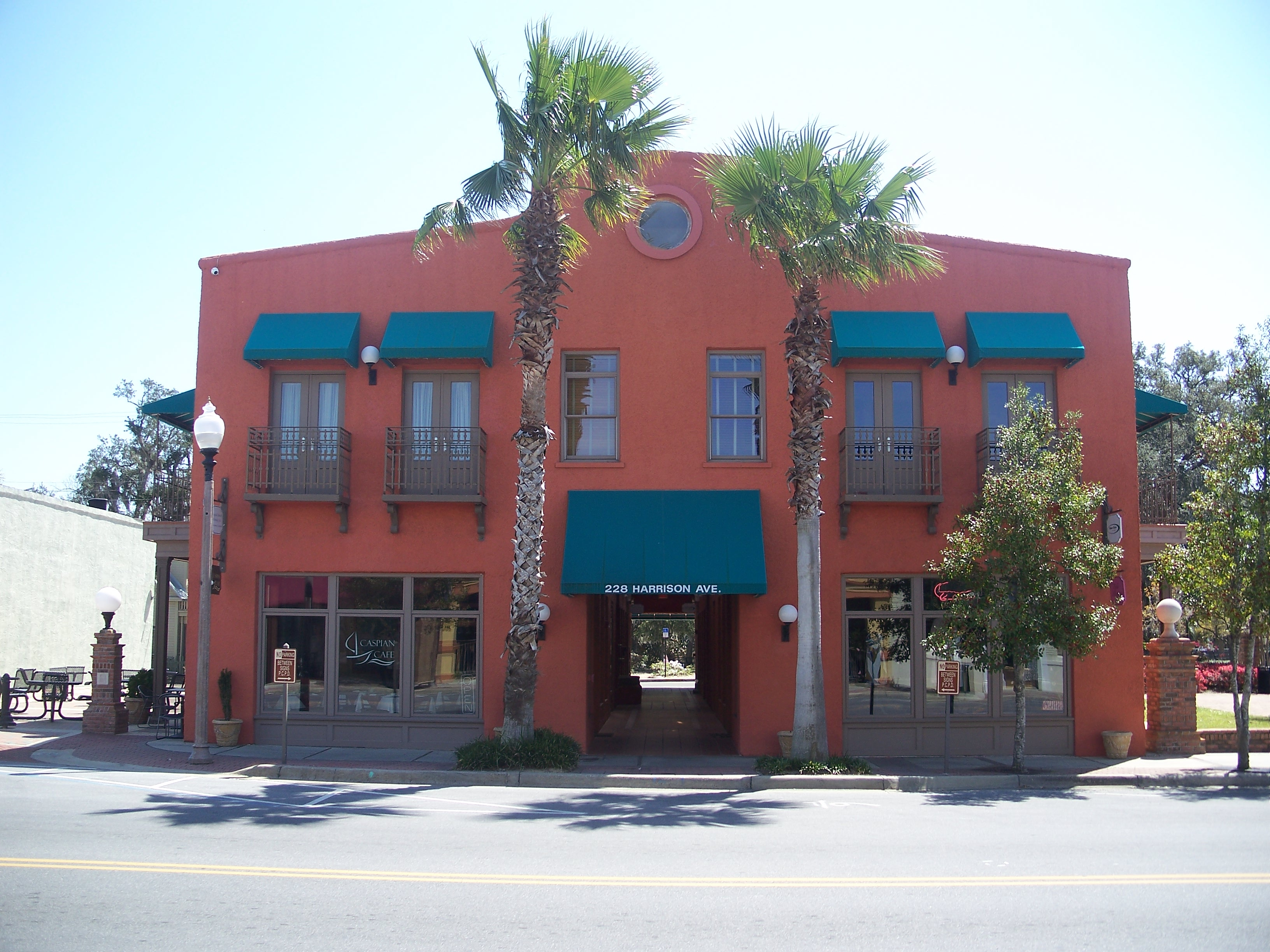

- Location within Florida Location within the United States
- Location: Panama City, Florida
- Coordinates: 30°9′16″N 85°39′39″W
- NRHP reference No.: 98001155
- Added to NRHP: September 9, 1998

The Sherman Arcade is located at 228 Harrison Avenue, Panama City, Bay County, Florida.

Constructed in 1934, the two-story masonry vernacular arcade has Mission Revival elements, and is of brick construction surfaced with stucco.

It was built by Panama City businessman W. C. Sherman. He used wood salvaged from the old German American Lumber Company and bricks from his dry kiln in Millville.

It was gutted and restored to its original design in 2003.

It houses retail businesses on the first floor and residential apartments on the second floor.

On September 9, 1998, it was added to the U.S. National Register of Historic Places.
