= Robert L. McKenzie House =

Historic house in Florida, United States

- Robert Lee McKenzie House
- U.S. National Register of Historic Places
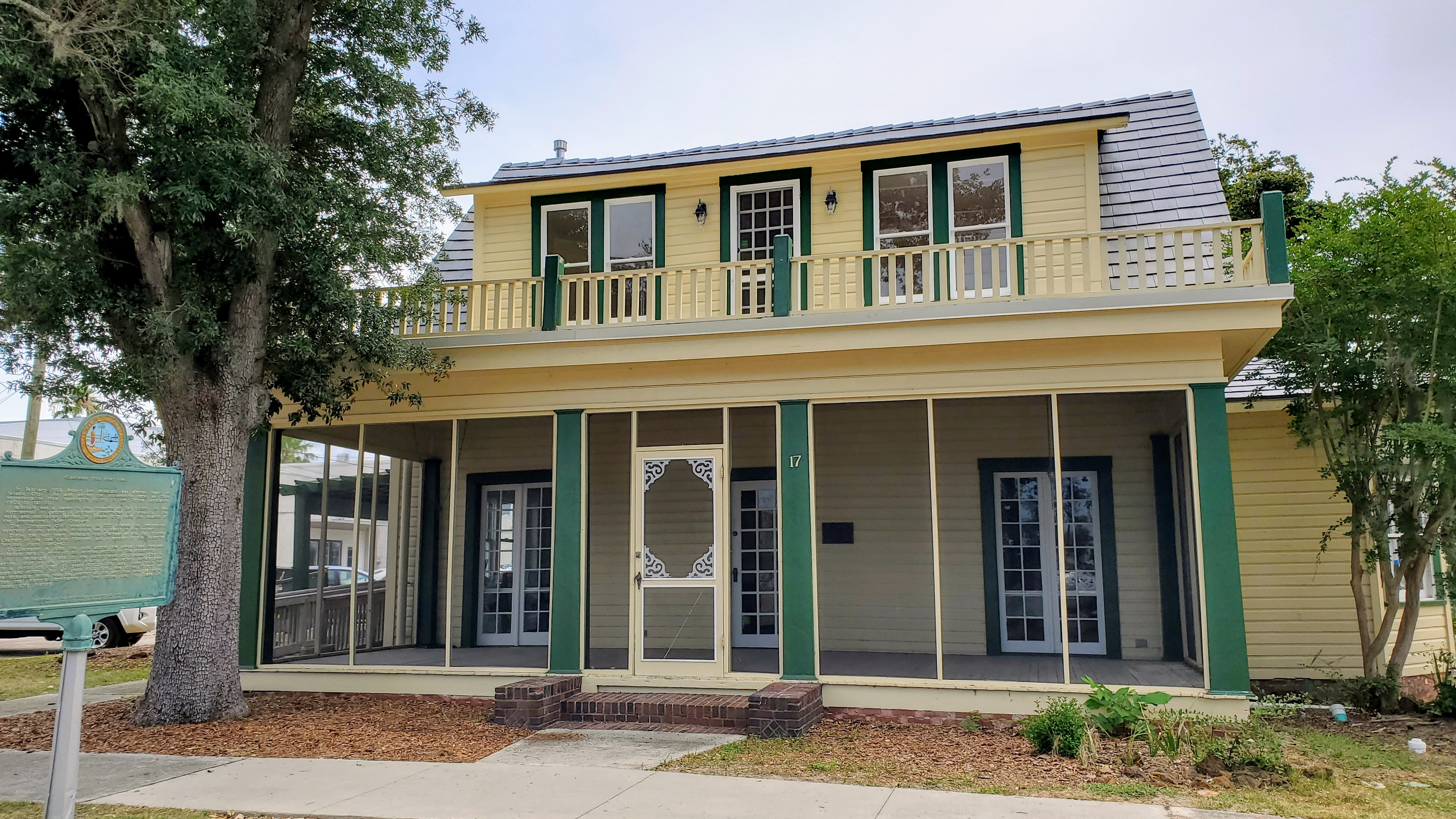
- June 2021

- Location within Florida Location within the United States
- Location: 17 East Third Court, Panama City, Florida
- Coordinates: 30°9′15″N 85°39′38″W
- Area: less than one acre
- Built: c. 1909
- Architectural style: Frame Vernacular
- NRHP reference No.: 86001728
- Added to NRHP: August 21, 1986

The Robert Lee McKenzie House (also known as the Belle Booth House) is a historic house in Panama City, Florida, at 17 East 3rd Court. It was added to the U.S. National Register of Historic Places on August 21, 1986. Robert Lee McKenzie was the first mayor of Panama City and a civic leader for fifty years. The house is a two-story clapboard frame dwelling built in the Dutch Colonial style typical of turn-of-the-20th-century houses in Northern Michigan. It was built in 1909 by Belle Booth who married R. L. McKenzie in 1912; the house was enlarged in 1925.

McKenzie acquired waterfront property and organized the Gulf Coast Development Company with the intent of making Panama City "Atlanta's outlet to the Panama Canal." McKenzie served as mayor of Panama City and two consecutive terms as state representative from Washington County in the Florida Legislature. "Most of the important events of the town's development for a period of over 50 years (1902-1956) are linked with his name and efforts," and the office/library of the McKenzie House was the center of his business activities. In 1964, the park across the street was renamed McKenzie Park in honor of his service to the community.

== Gallery ==
Pre 1925

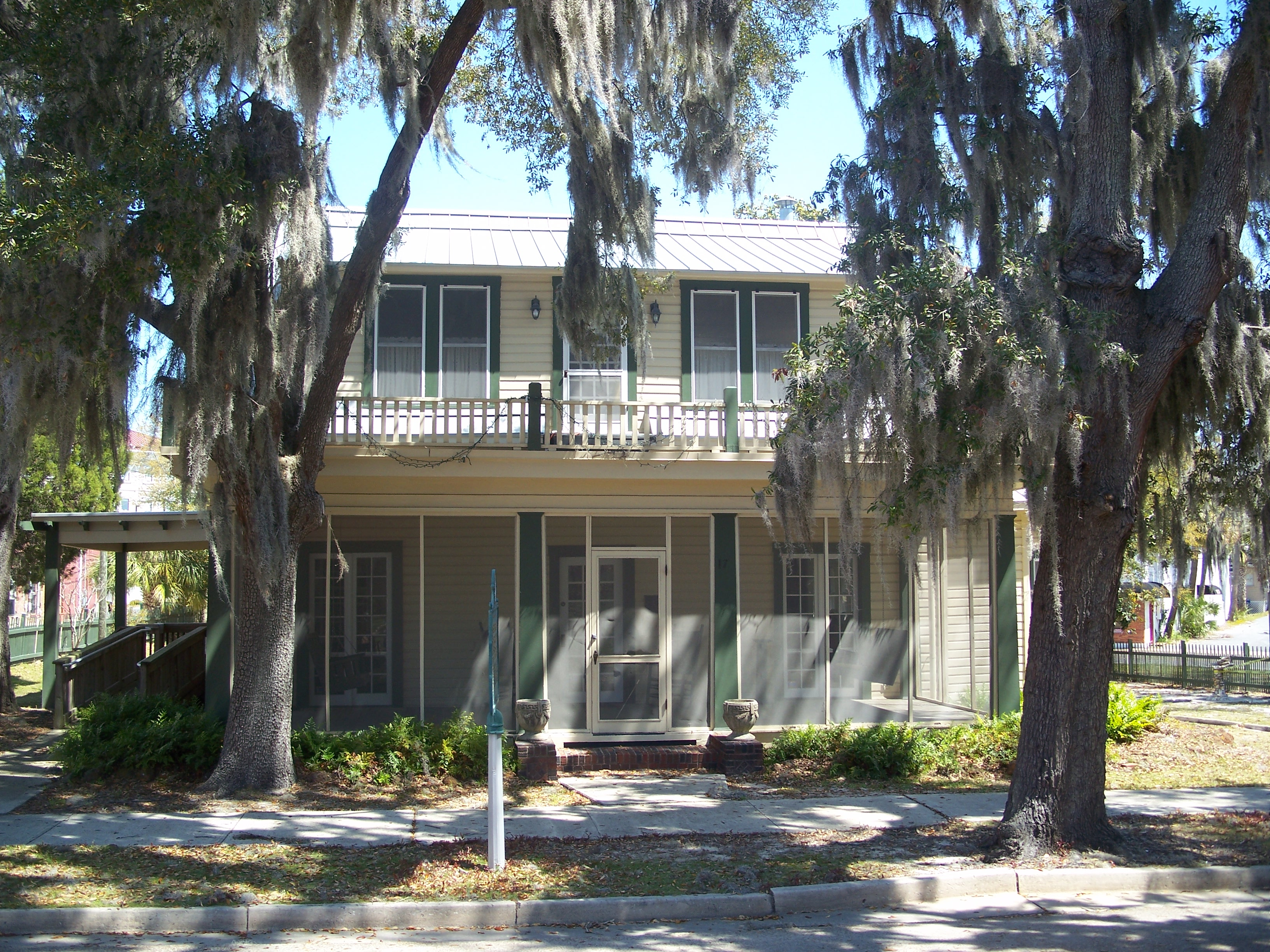
2008

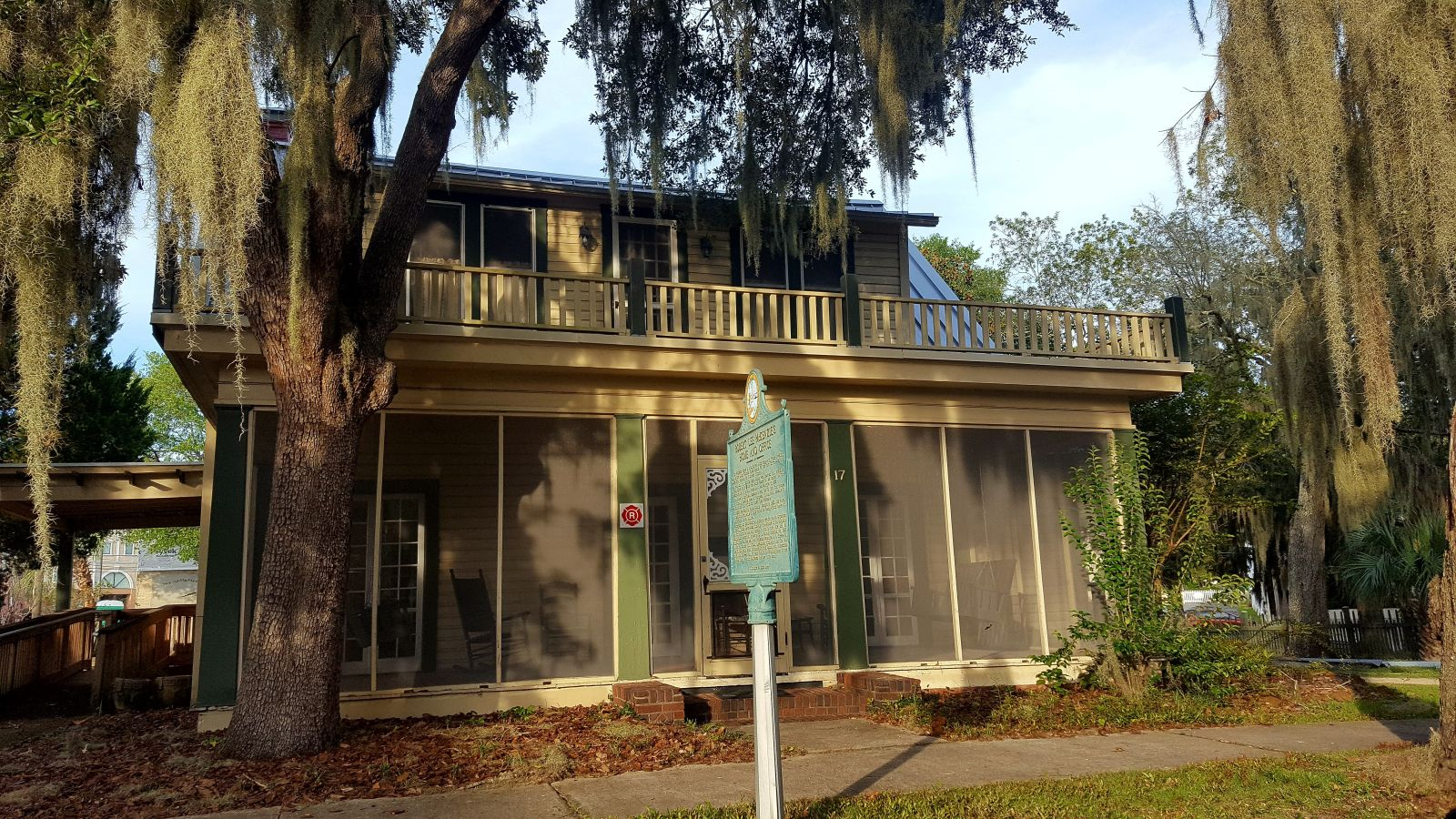
September 2017
