= Westphal–Schmidt House =

Historic house in Iowa, United States

- U.S. National Register of Historic Places
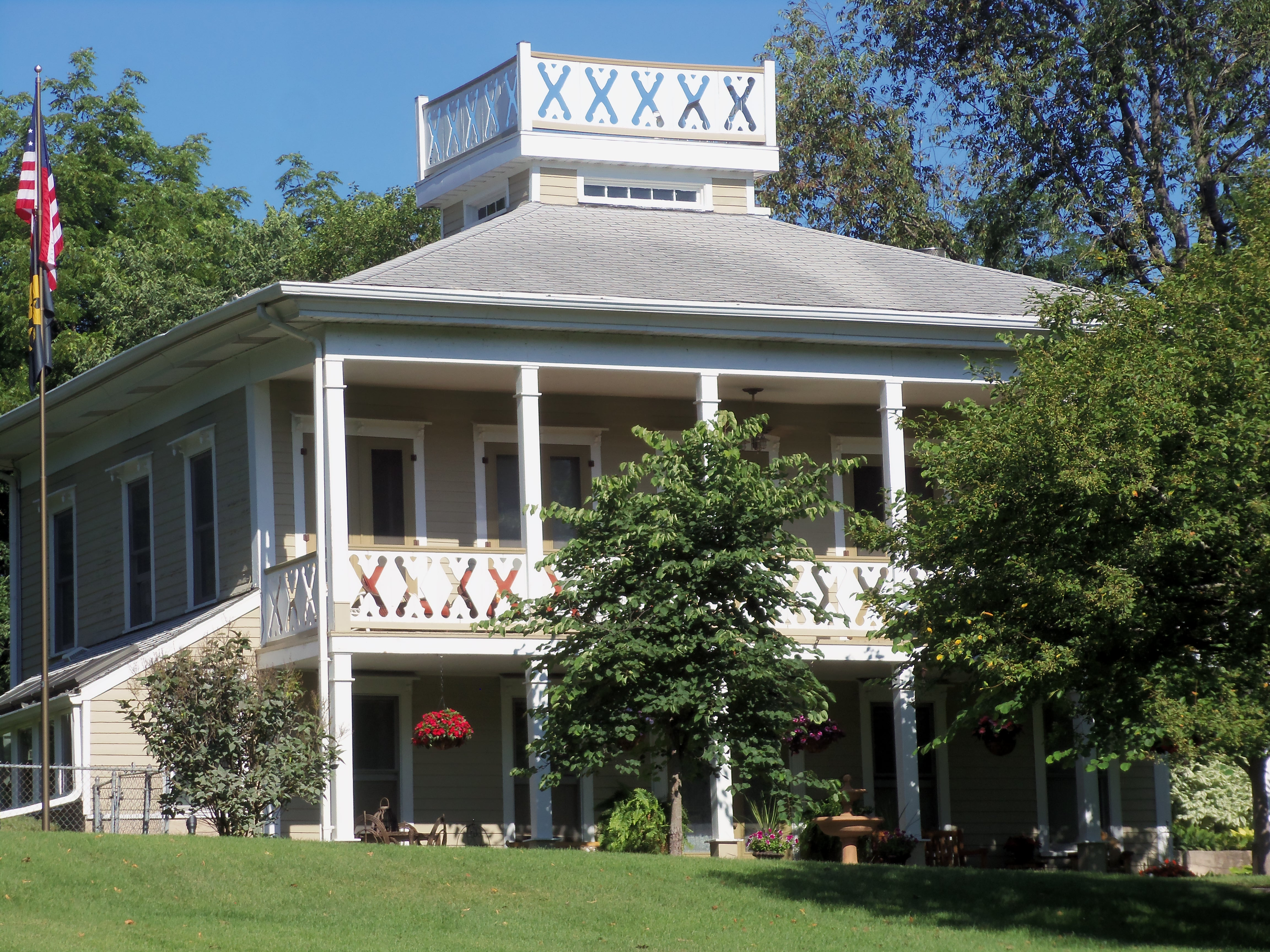

- Location within Iowa Location within the United States
- Location: 406 S. Fairmount St. Davenport, Iowa
- Coordinates: 41°30′54.3348″N 90°37′51.0672″W
- Area: 1 acre (0.40 ha)
- Built: 1857
- Architectural style: Italianate
- MPS: Davenport MRA
- NRHP reference No.: 84001591
- Added to NRHP: July 27, 1984

The Westphal–Schmidt House is a historic building located in the West End of Davenport, Iowa, United States. The residence has been listed on the National Register of Historic Places since 1984.

== History ==
This house was one of five summer homes that were built in this area in the 1850s, and the only one that retains its historical integrity. The first people to occupy the home were John and Dorathea Westphal. By the early 1860s, the home was owned by Fred T. Schmidt. He raised grapes and made wine with his brother Carl on their farm west of Black Hawk Creek, which was outside the city limits at the time.

== Architecture ==
The Westphal–Schmidt House was designed in the Tuscan Italianate style. The two-story gallery on the main façade, although not the original, is a unique feature for Italianate houses built in Davenport. Another unique feature of this house compared with other historic houses in the city is the slope of the property. Normally the property slopes to the back creating a walk-out basement. This property slopes toward the front making the main level of the house the basement level. The windows on the second floor are tall and narrow, which is typical of main floor windows in the Italianate style.

There is also a small brick structure to the southwest of the house that was believed to be used for the Schmidt's wine-making business. Although it has been altered it remains an interesting example of early brick and stone construction in the city.
