= Schmidt-Godert Farm =

- U.S. National Register of Historic Places
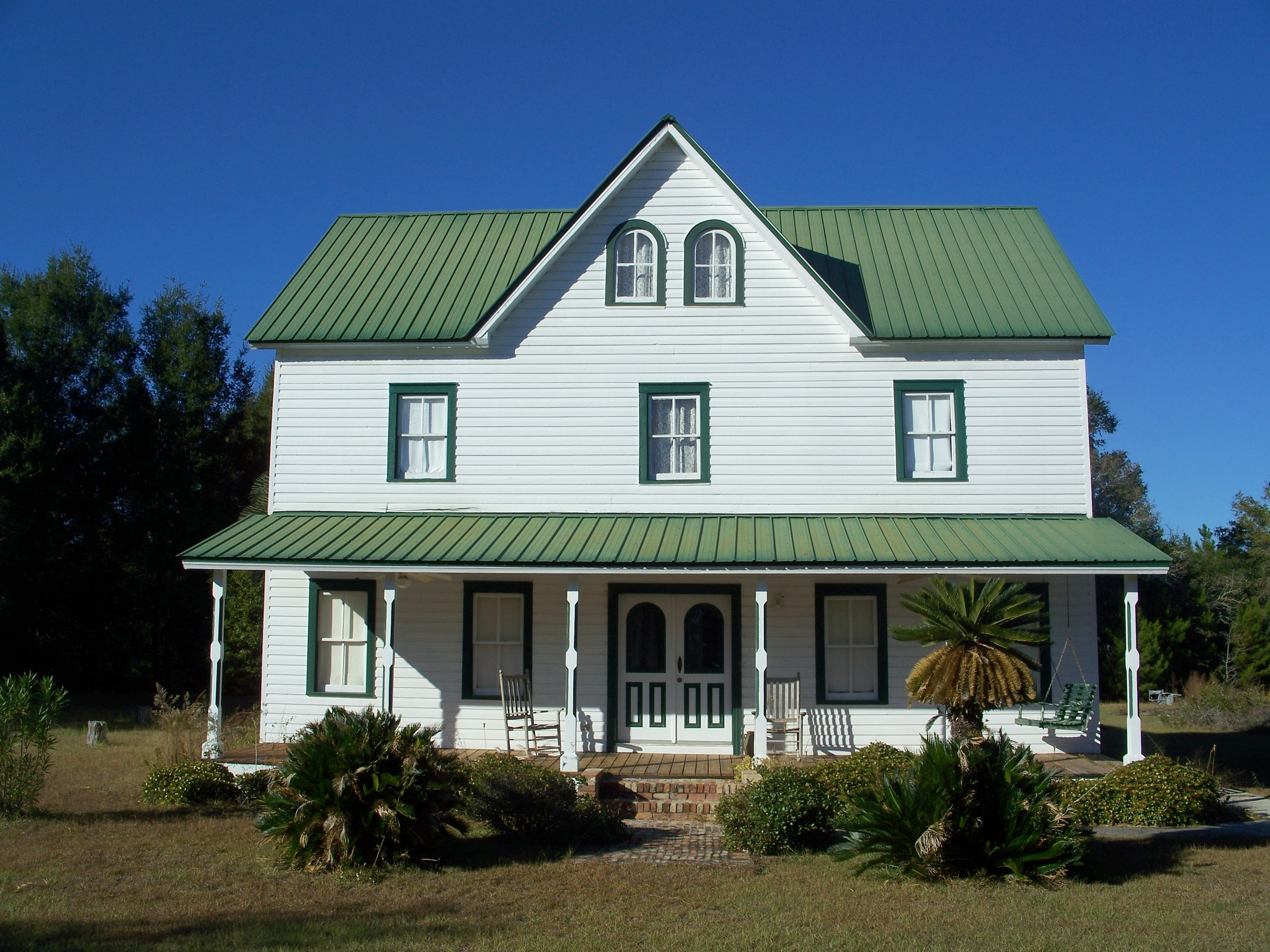

- Location within Florida Location within the United States
- Location: Panama City, Florida
- Coordinates: 30°8′48″N 85°30′2″W
- NRHP reference No.: 02001083
- Added to NRHP: October 4, 2002

The Schmidt-Godert Farm (also known as the Jacob Godert Farm) is a historic site in Panama City, Florida. It is located at 100 SR 2297. On October 4, 2002, it was added to the U.S. National Register of Historic Places. The first building built was the barn and was also used as a house until a proper house was later built. The cane mill was once used to make natural sugar cane by pears grown on the property. The main house was also once a bed and breakfast, shutting down permanently after Jacob Godert, Yvonne Godert's (current home owner) late husband fell ill. The parlor room was also used for funeral showings for several of the family members. All of the rooms for guests were labeled by color including a red room, yellow room, green room and blue room. The guest rooms are located on the second floor. On the bottom floor there is the kitchen, laundry room, dining room, master bedroom/accessible bedroom, library and parlor. The workers quarters and management area was located on the third floor where the doors were only around three feet tall. Also on the property is a blacksmith shop, a store shop, a more modern brick house, a chicken coop/vineyard area, a well and well tower as well as several pump houses. In the woods there were foundation for woods structures but the purpose was never confirmed. Trails were also made later on around the property.

On October 10, 2018, the barn was destroyed by Hurricane Michael. Roughly 6 months after, the blacksmith building was removed due to damage from the hurricane. The cane mill on the property is currently structurally unsound and is in a state of active decay. The store shop was also heavily damaged and the main house was left in unlivable conditions. The brick house remained undamaged and is the only building that can be lived in. All of the trails were also covered by debris and the wooden structures in the woods cannot be reached.
