= Walton County Courthouse =

Walton County Courthouse may refer to:

- Walton County Courthouse (Florida), DeFuniak Springs, Florida
- Walton County Courthouse (Georgia), Monroe, Georgia
