= The Vicarage (DeFuniak Springs, Florida) =

- The Vicarage; DeFuniak Springs, Florida
- U.S. Historic district – Contributing property
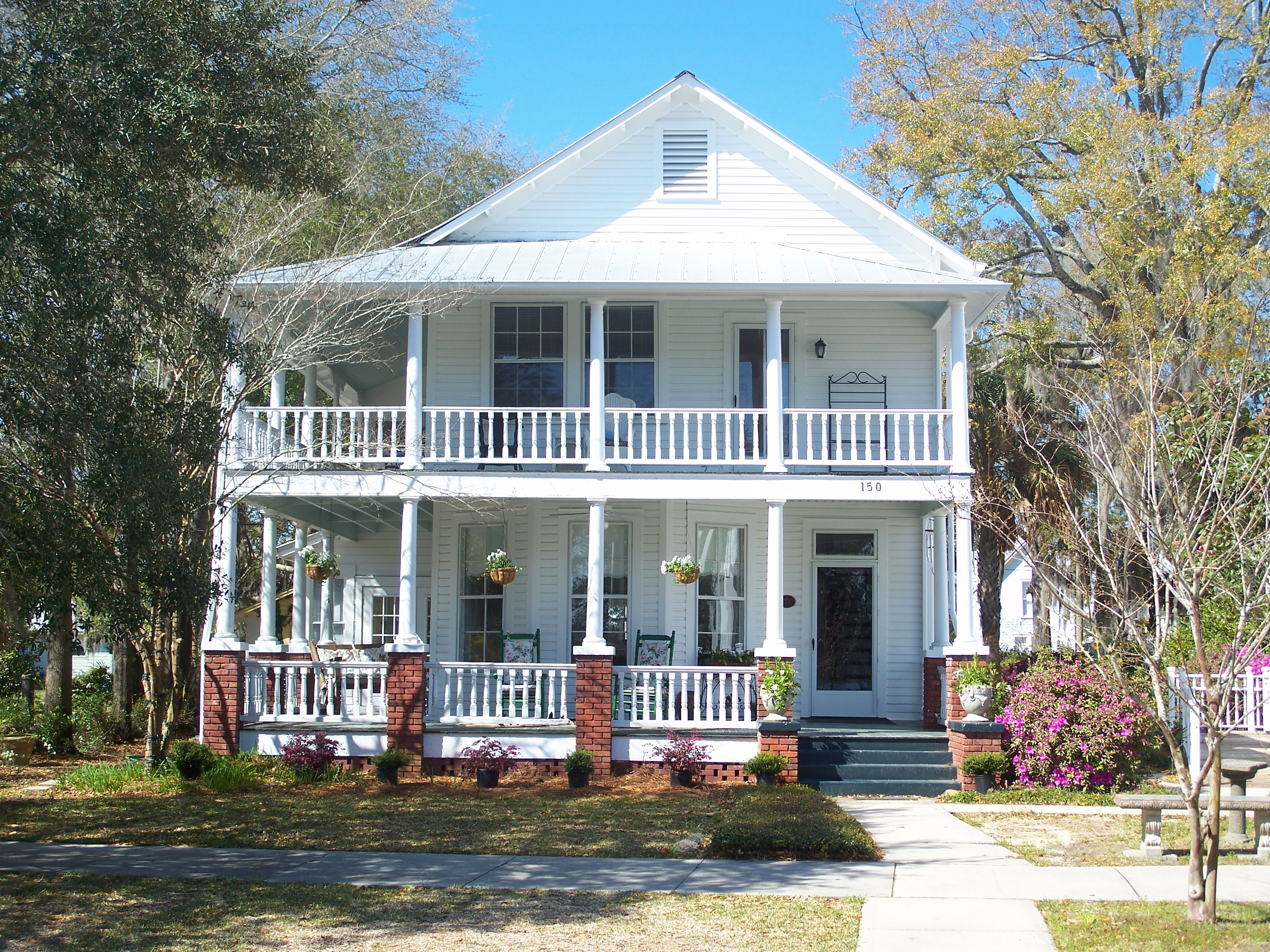
- The Vicarage. 2008

- Location within Florida Location within the United States
- Interactive map showing the location for The Vicarage
- Location: 150 Circle Drive; DeFuniak Springs, Florida, United States
- Coordinates: 30°42′58.57″N 86°6′57″W
- Built: 1896
- Architectural style: Frame Florida vernacular
- Part of: DeFuniak Springs Historic District (ID92001048)

The Vicarage is a historic house located at 150 Circle Drive, in DeFuniak Springs, Florida in the United States. Also known as McLendon House, it is located next to St. Agatha's Episcopal Church. It is a contributing property in the DeFuniak Springs Historic District, which was added to the National Register of Historic Places on August 28, 1992.

Built in 1889, it was one of two identical frame Florida vernacular houses which stood side by side on Circle Drive. Its twin to the left has since been moved to a different location on the drive. It went through a succession of private owners, some of whom used it as a boarding house for visitors to the DeFuniak Springs Chautauqua. St. Agatha's Episcopal Church, built in 1896 to its right, bought it for use as a vicarage in 1977 using funds given by Violet Horn McLendon of Marianna. The second floor serves as the private quarters of the vicar and family, while the first floor rooms and kitchen are shared with the congregation which use them as its parish hall.

== See also ==
- DeFuniak Springs Historic District
- Review of St. Agatha's by the Mystery Worshiper at the Ship of Fools
