= DeFuniak Springs Historic District =

Historic district in Florida, United States

- U.S. National Register of Historic Places
- U.S. Historic district
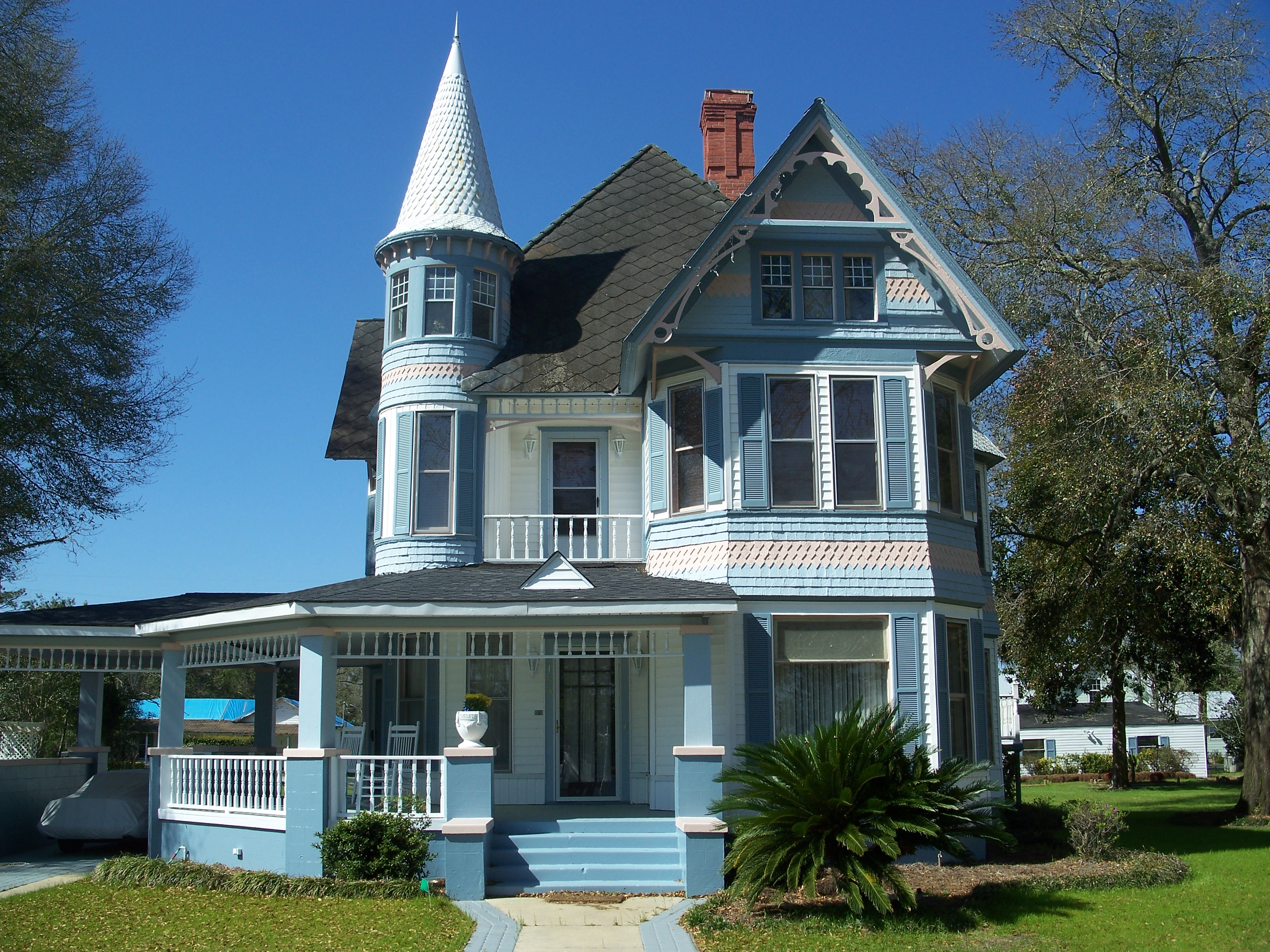
- House at 188 Circle Drive, in the district

- Location within Florida Location within the United States
- Interactive map showing the location for DeFuniak Springs Historic District
- Location: Roughly bounded by Nelson and Park Aves. and 2nd and 12th Sts., DeFuniak Springs, Florida
- Coordinates: 30°43′0″N 86°6′53″W
- Area: 1,900 acres (7.7 km^{2})
- Architect: William Dryer, W. T. May
- Architectural style: Late 19th And Early 20th Century American Movements, Late 19th And 20th Century Revivals, Late Victorian
- MPS: DeFuniak Springs MPS
- NRHP reference No.: 92001048
- Added to NRHP: August 28, 1992

The DeFuniak Springs Historic District is a U.S. historic district (designated as such on August 28, 1992) located in DeFuniak Springs, Florida. DeFuniak Springs, originally Lake DeFuniak, was named after Fred DeFuniak, the chief executive of the Louisville and Nashville Railroad. The district is bounded by Nelson and Park Avenues and 2nd and 12th Streets. It contains 172 historic buildings and 2 objects.

One such historic memorial is Florida's first stone memorial to the Confederacy. This memorial was first erected in Euchee Valley Presbyterian Church but currently resides on DeFuniak Springs' courthouse lawn.

Other than the Confederacy, a huge part of the town's history includes railroads. When railroad operation began in 1882, DeFuniak Springs became a popular railroad stop, particularly for the Louisville and Nashville Railroad. This brought a lot of new people to the area.

As a result of these new people coming to the area, another huge part, and perhaps the most important part, of the town's history began This was the rise of the Chautauqua. It is believed that the Chautauqua emerged because of the influence of the Lyceum Movement, the lack of educational quality in schools, and the rise of religion following the Civil War. After its formation, the Chautauqua spread all over the United States, including to DeFuniak Springs. The Florida Chautauqua continued from 1885 to 1922 and attracted thousands of visitors to the area. This eventually led to the building of the historic Chautauqua Hall of Brotherhood in 1909. This building originally included an auditorium that could seat up to 4,000 people, but the auditorium was destroyed by Hurricane Eloise in 1975. This building is located at 95 Circle Drive and is listed on the National Register of Historic Places.

Other locations listed on the National Register of Historic Places include 132 Circle Drive, which is a family residence built in 1900 and owned by the prominent citizen and realtor R.E.L. McCaskill, 144 Circle Drive, which is St. Agatha's Episcopal Church that was completed in 1896, and 150 Circle Drive, which is now the Parish House of St. Agatha's Episcopal Church but originally was built in 1900 to serve as a boarding house during the Chautauqua Era.

== See also ==
- Chautauqua Hall of Brotherhood
- St. Agatha's Episcopal Church
- Walton County Courthouse (Florida)
- Walton County Heritage Museum
- The Vicarage (DeFuniak Springs, Florida), a contributing property in the district
