= Walton County Courthouse (Florida) =

- U.S. Historic district – Contributing property
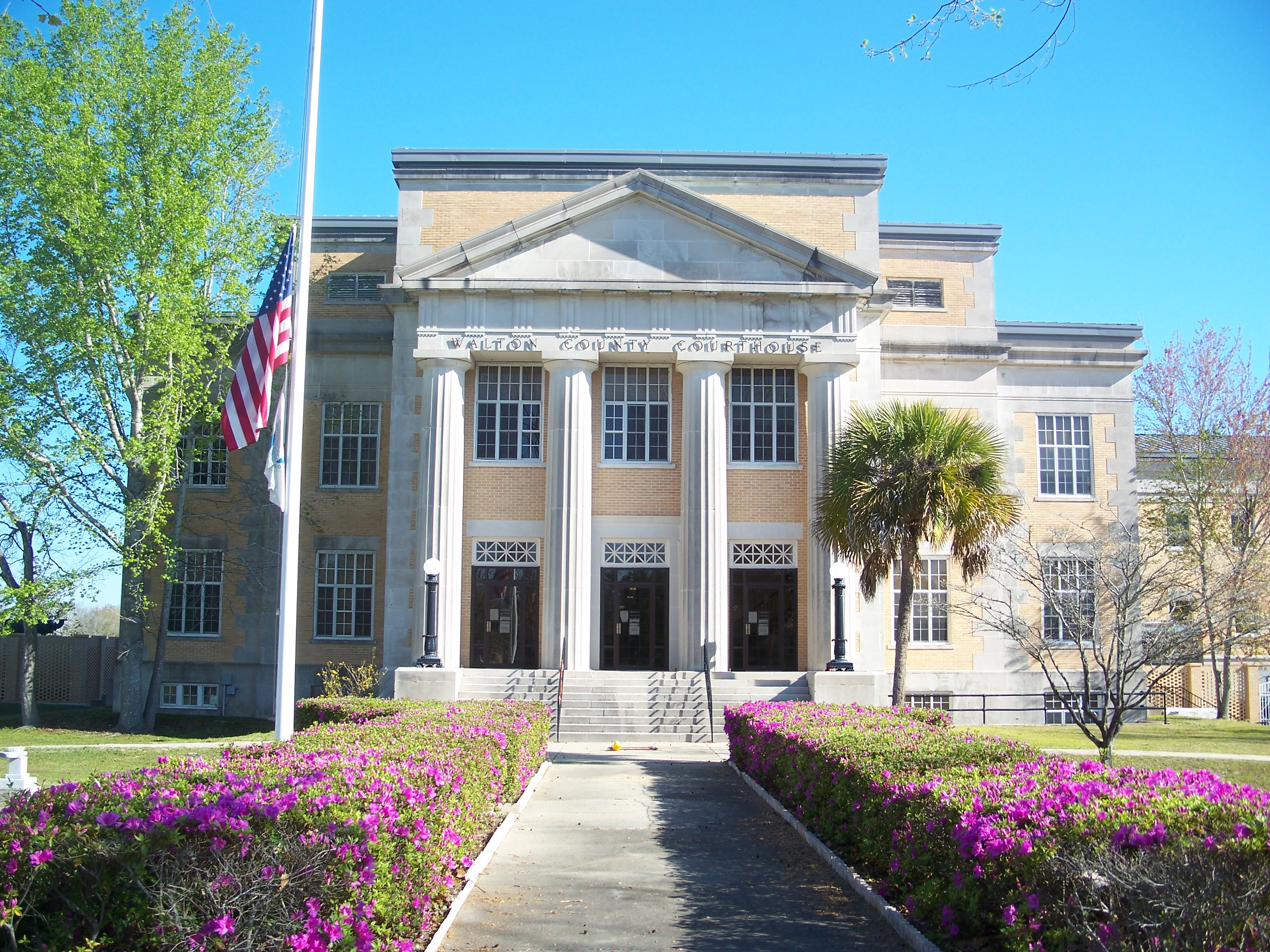
- Walton County Courthouse, 2008

- Location within Florida Location within the United States
- Interactive map showing the location for Walton County Courthouse
- Location: DeFuniak Springs, Florida, U.S.
- Coordinates: 30°43′16″N 86°6′41″W
- Built: ca. 1927
- Architect: Warren, Knight & Davis of Birmingham, Alabama
- Part of: DeFuniak Springs Historic District (ID92001048)

The Walton County Courthouse is a historic courthouse building located in DeFuniak Springs, Florida. It is a contributing property in the DeFuniak Springs Historic District, which was added to the National Register of Historic Places on August 28, 1992.

A new addition to the courthouse was opened in October 2007 and the original courthouse is being renovated.

== Confederate monument ==
The Confederate monument was erected in 1871 on the old courthouse grounds in Valley Church, then moved to a new courthouse site in Eucheeanna and finally moved to DeFuniak Springs when this courthouse was built. It was erected in memory of the county's war dead and was reportedly the first such monument built. A Confederate battle flag was erected next to the monument on the Walton County courthouse lawn in April 1964 according to the DeFuniak Herald/Beach Breeze newspaper. On July 28, 2015, the Walton County Board of County Commissioners voted to replace the Confederate battle flag with the First National Confederate flag despite protests from local citizens.

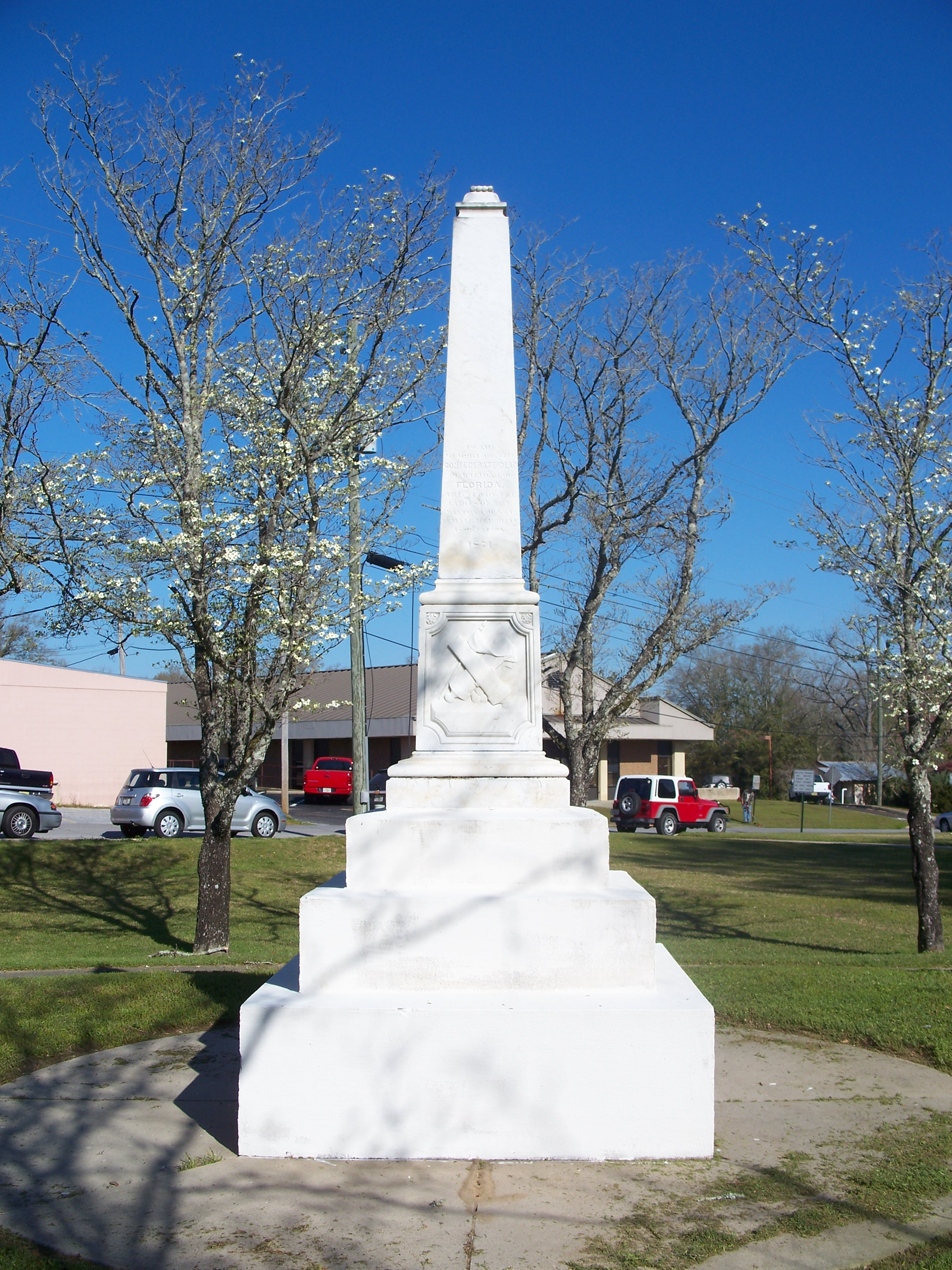
Confederate monument

== See also ==
- Walton County Courthouse (disambiguation)
