= St. Agatha's Episcopal Church =

Historic church in Florida, United States

- U.S. Historic district – Contributing property
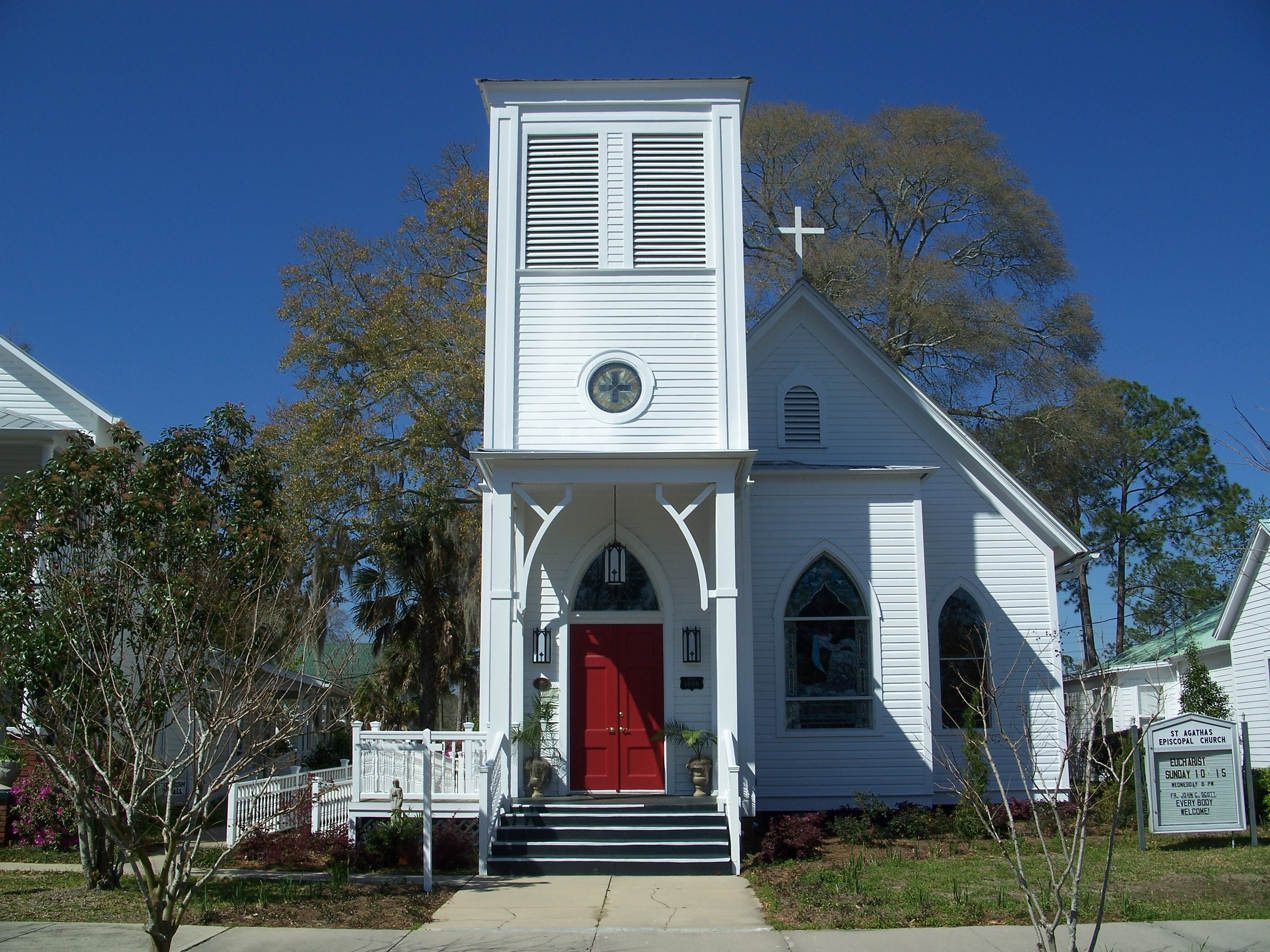
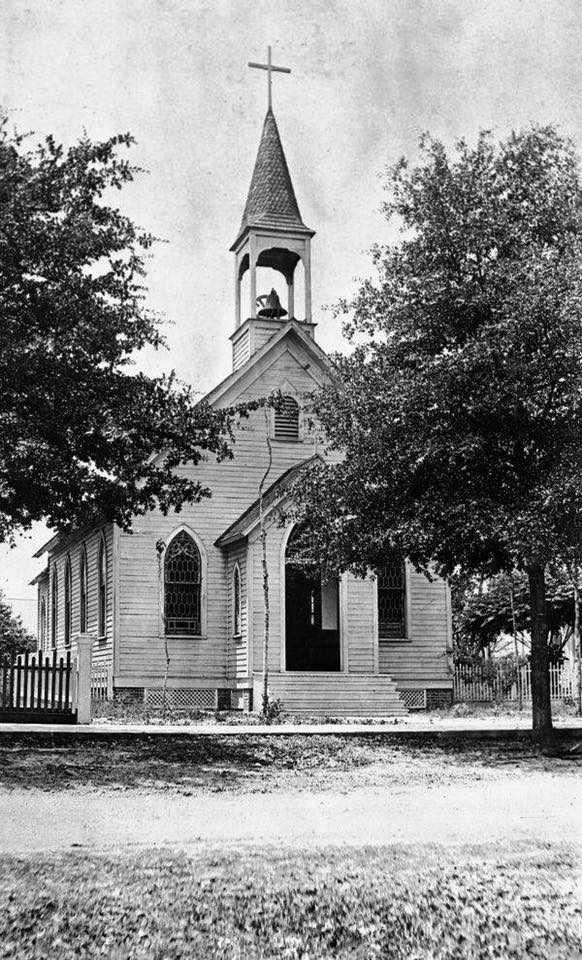
- St. Agatha's Episcopal Church, 2008 St Agathas Episcipal Church Circa 1915

- Location within Florida Location within the United States
- Location: 144 Circle Drive; DeFuniak Springs, Florida,
- Coordinates: 30°42′58.57″N 86°6′57″W
- Built: 1896
- Architectural style: Carpenter Gothic
- Part of: DeFuniak Springs Historic District (ID92001048)
- Added to NRHP: August 28, 1992

St. Agatha's Episcopal Church is a historic Carpenter Gothic Episcopal church located at 144 Circle Drive, in DeFuniak Springs, Florida in the United States. It is a contributing property in the DeFuniak Springs Historic District.

== History ==
In the late 1880s, the Rt. Rev. Edwin G. Weed, third bishop of the Episcopal Diocese of Florida, found three families of Episcopalians when he visited DeFuniak Springs and from that nucleus St. Agatha's was born. The first baptism was in 1890 in a private home. Construction of the church building began in 1895. At Easter, when the women of the mission wanted services in the unfinished church they asked the men of the church to read Morning Prayer. The men refused stating that the church had not yet been consecrated and no men in the parish had yet been licensed as lay readers to conduct services. The women took matters into their own hands. They decked the lath that was awaiting plaster with flowers and greenery from floor to ceiling and proceeded to read Morning Prayer. This was long before women became eligible to be licensed as lay readers. The church has the only pipe organ in the county. It was built by a parishioner and completed in 1990.

Over the years, the building deteriorated and some repairs were made. Vinyl siding was added to avoid high painting costs. However some of the wood underneath the vinyl rotted. The rains eroded the foundation and the leaded glass windows began to bow. From 2000 to 2007, with the help of matching grants from the state Bureau of Historic Preservation, St. Agatha's was able to restore its original exterior. Independently they made other repairs needed to restore the church interior and Parish House. The church was rededicated on December 9, 2007.

St. Agatha's has had few full-time priests. The attendance is only around 30-40 people. However, in 2011 members were able to purchase the Charles Murray home to the south of the church. It served as the vicarage for a short time allowing the former vicarage to be used as the parish hall, church office and classrooms. When that priest retired, the Diocese of the Central Gulf Coast established a School for Ministry there early in 2017. The home, also a contributing site in the DeFuniak Springs Historic District is available for church and community meetings, seminars and retreats since the School for Ministry students are present only one long weekend each month. This historic structure also needs repair and a grant has been submitted for this purpose. The church is still a functioning organized mission in the Episcopal Diocese of the Central Gulf Coast.

== See also ==
- DeFuniak Springs Historic District
- The Vicarage (DeFuniak Springs, Florida)
- Review of the services at St. Agatha's by a Mystery Worshiper from the Ship of Fools
