= U.S. Route 98 in Florida =

Highway in Florida

U.S. Highway 98

Route information
- Maintained by FDOT
- Length: 670.959 mi (1,079.804 km)
- Existed: 1933–present

Major junctions
- West end: US 98 near Lillian, Alabama
- I-110 in Pensacola; US 231 in Panama City; US 19 / US 27 / US 221 in Perry; US 41 in Brooksville; I-75 in Brooksville; I-4 in Lakeland; US 441 / SR 70 in Okeechobee; Florida's Turnpike near Royal Palm Beach; I-95 in West Palm Beach; US 1 in West Palm Beach
- East end: SR A1A / SR 80 in Palm Beach

Location
- Country: United States
- State: Florida
- Counties: Escambia, Santa Rosa, Okaloosa, Walton, Bay, Gulf, Franklin, Wakulla, Jefferson, Taylor, Dixie, Gilchrist, Levy, Citrus, Hernando, Pasco, Polk, Highlands, Okeechobee, Martin, Palm Beach

Highway system
- United States Numbered Highway System; List; Special; Divided; Florida State Highway System; Interstate; US; State; Former; Pre‑1945; Toll; Scenic
← SR 97	→ SR 99

U.S. Route 98 (US 98) is a major east-west thoroughfare through the U.S. state of Florida. Spanning 670.959 miles (1,079.804 km), it connects Pensacola and the Alabama state line to the west with Palm Beach and the Atlantic coast in the east. It is the longest US road (and the longest route of any kind) in Florida, as well as the longest US road in any state east of the Mississippi River.

It was established in 1933 as a route between Pensacola and Apalachicola, and has since been extended eastward across the Florida Peninsula and westward into Mississippi. It runs along much of the Gulf Coast between Mobile, Alabama and Crystal River, Florida, including extensive sections closely following the coast eastward from the Alabama-Florida state line to St. Marks.

Within Florida, US 98 is marked as an east–west road from the Alabama state line to Perry. Throughout most of the Florida Peninsula, the road is marked as a north–south road, but directions return to east–west on the northeast shore of Lake Okeechobee.

As is the case with all Florida roads with federal designations, the entirety of US 98 has a hidden Florida Department of Transportation designation:

- State Road 80 from the US route's eastern terminus at SR A1A in Palm Beach to Main Street (SR 15) in Belle Glade.
- State Road 15 from Hooker Highway (SR 812/SR 80) in Belle Glade to the junction with Parrot Avenue (US 441 / SR 15) and Park Street (SR 70 east) in Okeechobee.
- State Road 700 from the route's eastern split in Canal Point to Lake Parker Avenue (SR 700 north) in Lakeland, and again from to US 92 in Lakeland to South Suncoast Boulevard (US 19) in Citrus County.
- State Road 35 from SR 60 / Broadway Avenue (SR 35 south) in Bartow to US 301 in Pasco County, with one exception:
  - State Road 548 from Main Street (SR 35 north) to George Jenkins Boulevard (SR 548 west) in Lakeland.
- State Road 55 from South Suncoast Boulevard (US 19 south) in Citrus County to US 221 (SR 55 north) in Perry.
- State Road 30 from US 221 in Perry to the Alabama state line via the Lillian Bridge over Perdido Bay, with the following exceptions:
  - State Road 30A between the eastern and western termini of both of US 98 Business (SR 30) and US 98 Alternate (SR 30) in Bay County
  - State Road 289 from US 98 Business (SR 30) to US 90 (SR 10A) in Pensacola.
  - State Road 10A from North 9th Avenue (SR 289 north) to North Pace Boulevard (SR 292 north) in Pensacola.
  - State Road 292 from West Cervantes Street (US 90 / SR 10A) to US 98 Business (SR 30) in Pensacola.

Concurrencies include US 90 in Pensacola, US 319 from Port St. Joe to St. Teresa and in Medart, ALT US 27 from Perry to Chiefland, US 19 from Perry to Chassahowitzka, US 41 then SR 50A in Brooksville, SR 50 from Brooksville to Ridge Manor, US 301 from Moss Town to Clinton Heights, US 17 from Bartow to Fort Meade, US 27 from West Frostproof to South Sebring, US 441 from Okeechobee to Royal Palm Beach, and SR 80 from near Belle Glade to Palm Beach.

== Route description ==
US 98 is a 671-mile-long (1,080 km) route that extends from the panhandle to Palm Beach. From the Alabama state line to Apalachee Bay, it follows the coast of the Gulf of Mexico through Pensacola and Panama City. It then turns inland and passes through Perry and Chiefland before turning back towards the gulf coast north of Crystal River. The highway stairsteps its way across the peninsula through Dade City, Lakeland, and Sebring. Near Lake Okeechobee, it follows the northern and eastern shore toward Belle Glade. It then heads east to its endpoint on the Atlantic seaboard in Palm Beach.

=== Across the Panhandle ===
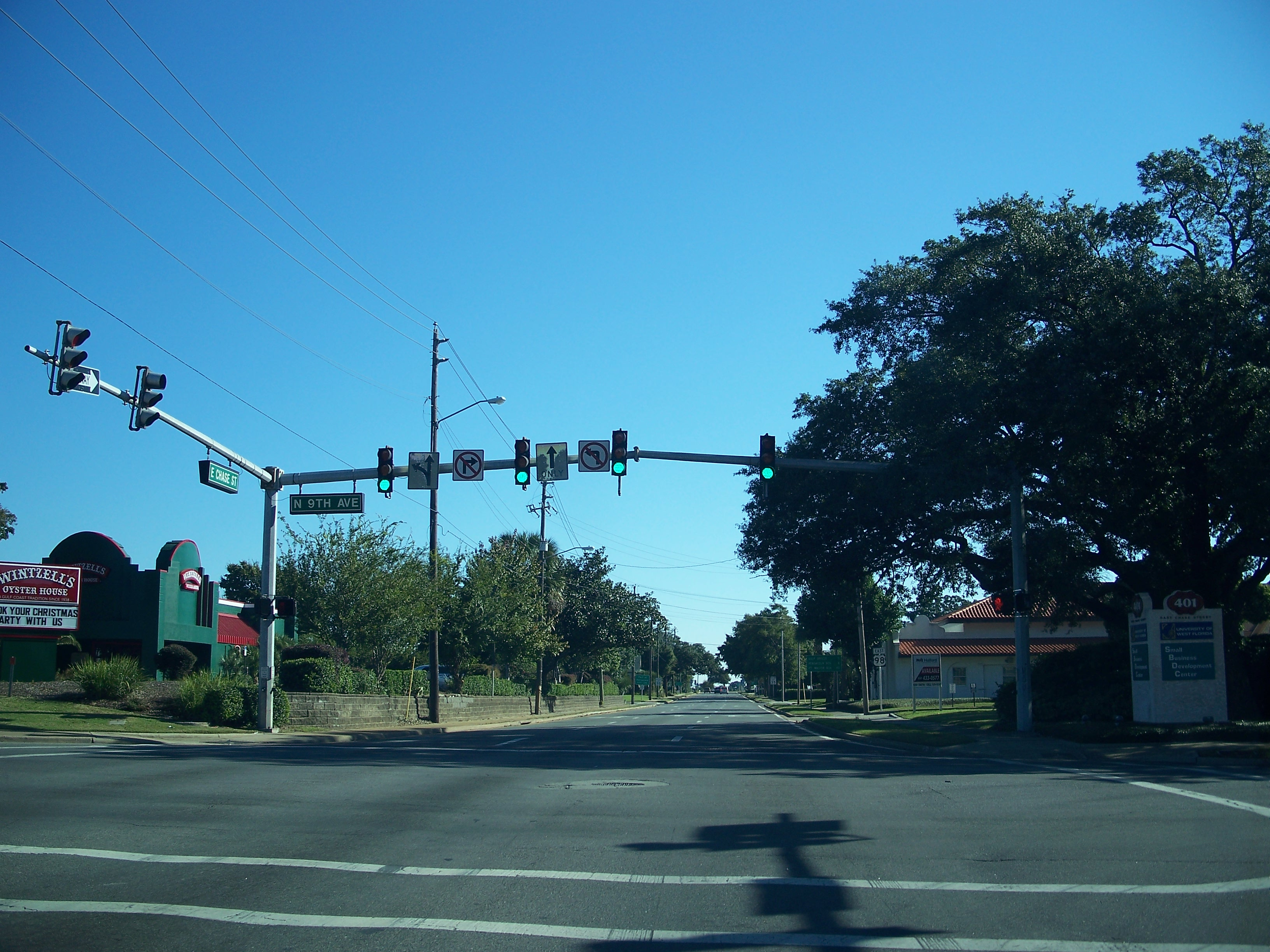
US 98 concurrency with Chase Street, in downtown Pensacola

US 98 enters Florida from Alabama via the Lillian Bridge which spans Perdido Bay. The two-lane highway lands on the state's western shore just west of Pensacola as Lillian Highway. At an intersection with SR 298 and County Road 297 (CR 297), Lillian Highway splits away from US 98 and continues along the state road. At SR 173, US 98 widens into a four-lane divided highway. SR 727 provides access to Warrington to the south and to Pensacola's northwestern suburbs. As it enters West Pensacola, US 98 passes along the southern border of the Corry Station Naval Technical Training Center. It turns north onto SR 295 and the two routes head north together for a short distance. Both SR 173 and SR 295 direct traffic to Naval Air Station Pensacola, which lies three miles (4.8 km) south of the intersection of US 98 and SR 295.

US 98 enters Pensacola after traversing a short bridge across Bayou Chico. A few blocks later, it turns onto Pace Boulevard (SR 292), which takes US 98 north to West Cervantes Street, which carries US 90. Together, US 90 and US 98 run through the heart of Pensacola. They intersect US 29 (N. Palafox Street), a half diamond interchange with Interstate 110 (I-10), and the SR 291 one-way couplet of Dr. Martin Luther King Jr. Drive (southbound) and Davis Highway (northbound). Shortly thereafter, US 98 turns south at SR 289 and splits away from US 90. US 98 and SR 289 are concurrent for a few blocks until the U.S. Highway's eastbound traffic turns onto E. Chase Street; westbound traffic arrives at SR 289 on E. Gregory Street. After a short jaunt on the Bayfront Parkway, US 98 turns south to cross the 3-mile-long (4.8 km) Pensacola Bay Bridge over the eponymous body of water.

The highway lands on the Fairpoint Peninsula in Gulf Breeze. It passes Gulf Breeze High School before it turns to the east. On the opposite end of the eastward curve is a trumpet interchange with Pensacola Beach Boulevard, which heads south to Pensacola Beach. East of Gulf Breeze, US 98 goes through the Naval Live Oaks Reservation. It meets SR 281 in Tiger Point. The route then continues on through Navarre, where it intersects with Florida State Road 87 and then the Navarre Beach Causeway.

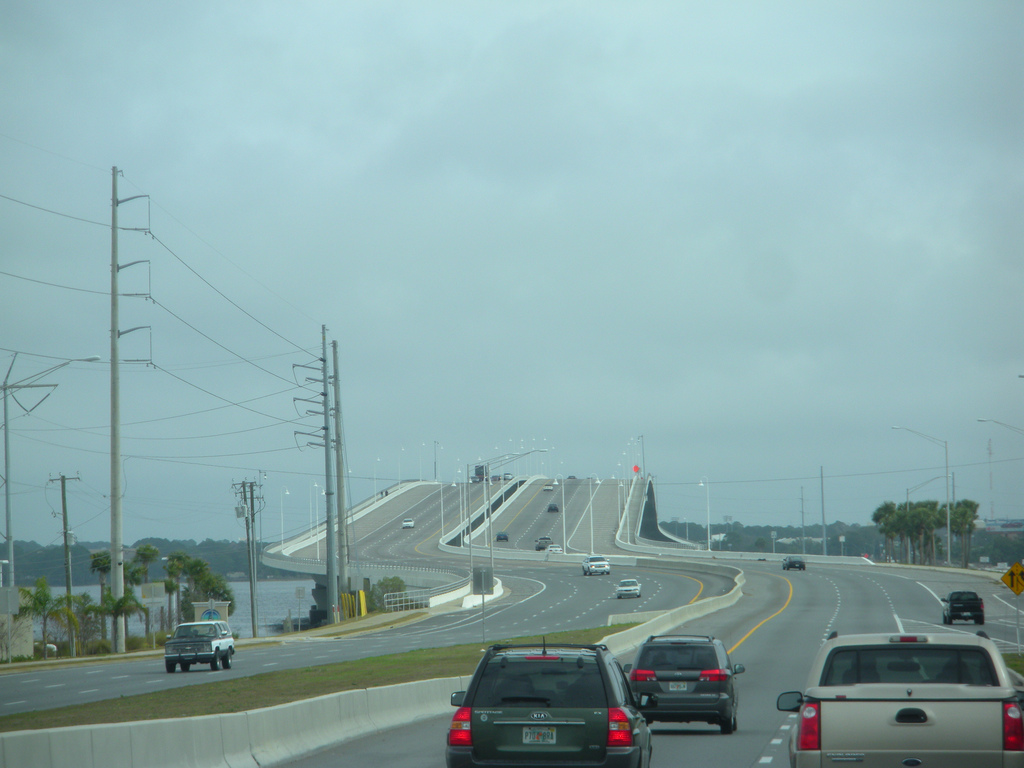
The Hathaway Bridge, which carries US 98 from Panama City Beach to Panama City

US 98 continues on to Perry through Okaloosa, Walton, Bay, Gulf, Franklin, Wakulla, Jefferson, and Taylor counties, passing through different cities and towns, such as Fort Walton Beach, Destin, Miramar Beach, Florida Santa Rosa Beach, Panama City, Port St. Joe, and Apalachicola, along the well-known Emerald Coast and the quieter, less developed Forgotten Coast.

=== South turn: Concurrency with US 19 ===
Within the city limits of Perry, US 98 and SR 30 makes a sharp turn to the south along US 19 which is also the northern terminus of US 27 Alternate and is named Byron Butler Parkway. US 27, which replaces US 98 as an overlapping US route for US 19 heads east along hidden State Road 20. It also briefly carries US 221 Truck until it reaches County Road 359A (Wright Road). The intersection with US 19/US 27/US 27 Alt./US 221 Truck marks the point where US 98 changes from an east-west to a north-south signed designation, an exception to the conventional numbering scheme for U.S. Highways, under which even-numbered routes are typically signed as east-west routes.

US 221 terminates at US 98 along with that truck route, and the hidden route SR 55 joins the concurrency. In Bucell Junction, State Road 30 turns east State Road 30A near the Perry-Foley Airport. SR 30 turns east as it heads towards US 27 east of the Perry City Limits. and SR 55 becomes the sole secret designation. Later on, US 19-98-ALT 27 enters Tennille, where it intersects with State Road 51. After this the road crosses the Steinhatchee River as it enters Dixie County and begins to make less of a southerly turn and more of an easterly one. The rest of the way, US 98 passes through small towns such as Shamrock where it intersects County Road 358 twice. The road starts making more of an east turn after this and shortly afterwards encounters CR 351 in Cross City, and then State Road 349 and CR 349 in Old Town, which used to be US 129 Alternate. It even contains a Truck Weight station in the median before it follows the left bank of the Suwannee River and intersects the eastern terminus of County Road 55A, before it crosses the Joe H. Anderson Sr. Bridge over the Suwannee River. After this it enters Fanning Springs, where it runs along the border of Gilchrist and Levy Counties. US 19-ALT 27-98 makes a sharp right turn after the intersection of State Road 26 and finally enters Levy County entirely. South of there US 98 continues its pattern of having a limited number of left-turn lanes in the center-median. Recent development in the area may lead to the addition of such turn lanes.

In Chiefland, US 19-98-Alt 27 has a brief hidden concurrency with State Road 320. The hidden route is exposed as SR 320 turns west into Manatee Springs State Park. Later it encounters an intersection with the southern terminus of US 129. Almost instantly, US 27 Alternate leaves US 19-98 onto hidden SR 500 as it heads towards Bronson and Williston. This intersection was transformed into a 90-degree intersection, which directly faces a local high school. From there, US 19-98 runs along an abandoned railroad line along the east side, while the median is widened and lined with the trees that existed before the road was ever built. Blinking signals exist over the intersection with State Road 24 in Otter Creek, and at some point south of there, an overlap with CR 336 begins. At the intersection of County Road 326 in Gulf Hammock, an old locomotive and caboose is on display, and eventually Goethe State Forest where ironically the wide, tree-lined median comes to an end before reaching an at-grade interchange with State Road 121 & County Road 336 in Lebanon Junction. Leaving the forest, the road crosses the Ten Mile Creek bridge. South of Lebanon Junction, US 19-98 runs along sparse residences, trailer parks, a Florida Sheriff's Youth Facility, the Gulf Hammock Wildlife Management Area.

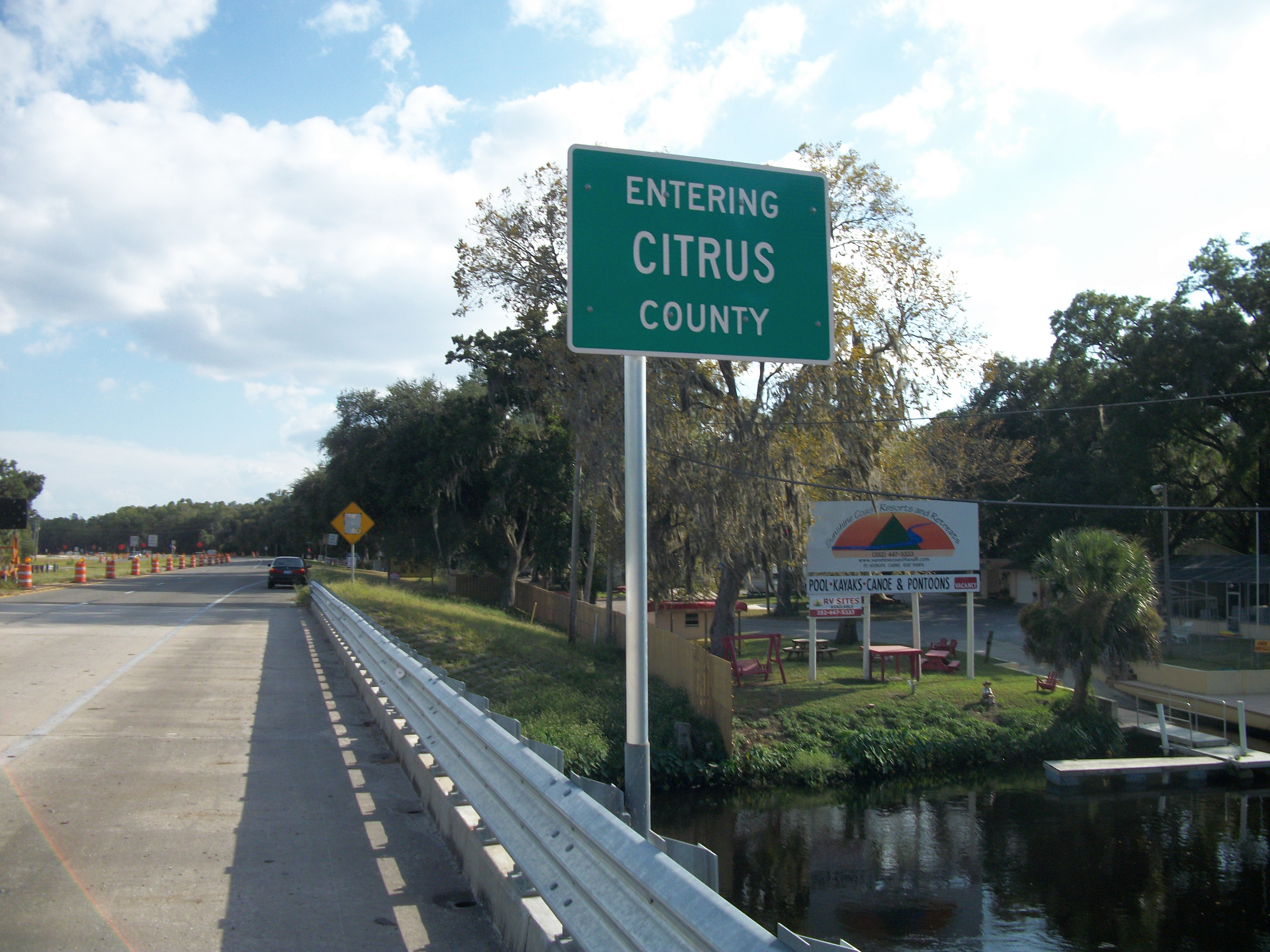
Southbound US 19-98 as they cross the Withlacoochee River between Levy and Citrus Counties.

US 19-98 eventually enters the city of Inglis, where it serves as the eastern terminus of CR 40A. A more important intersection is encountered deeper within the city, and that intersection happens to be its parent route County Road 40. West of US 19-98, CR 40 is named "Follow That Dream Boulevard" for the 1962 movie starring Elvis Presley. A small four-lane bridge carries US 19-98 across the Withlacoochee River as it crosses the Citrus-Levy-Citrus County Line. After running between a pair of trailer parks and a sand mine, it approaches a much larger bridge. The Cross Florida Barge Canal was the last section of US 19 that is two lanes wide in Citrus County. A new four-lane divided bridge was completed by FDOT in the early-2010s, which was originally planned in conjunction with the proposed Suncoast Parkway extension to Red Level. Before reaching the potential site of this interchange, it runs by a field where American Civil War re-enactments are staged lies just north of the back entrance to a local quarry, which is across from the western terminus of County Road 488. The quarry obstructs a former segment of US 19-98, as does the territory for the Crystal River Nuclear Power Plant. South of there US 19-98 passes by sparsely located hotels, bars, houses, cluster developments and signs advertising locally prepared peanuts, and in between also passes by the Seven Rivers Regional Medical Center.

As the road approaches a car dealership on the northwest corner of West State Park Drive, a local road leading to Crystal River Preserve State Park one truly begins to feel that he or she has entered the City of Crystal River, since it then passes by the Crystal River Mall, and the divider ends as US 19-98 becomes a four-lane undivided boulevard. It then curves east as it passes by some more motels and restaurants on the water across from City Hall then approaches County Road 495 (North Citrus Avenue). East of this intersection, it crosses the Cross Town Trail, a small rail-trail that was once an Atlantic Coast Line Railroad line spanning from Homosassa through Dunnellon. The road starts to curve south again, just north of the intersection of State Road 44, but it also has a hidden concurrency with SR 44 south of that point. From Northeast First Terrace a divided and some bicycle lanes begin once again.

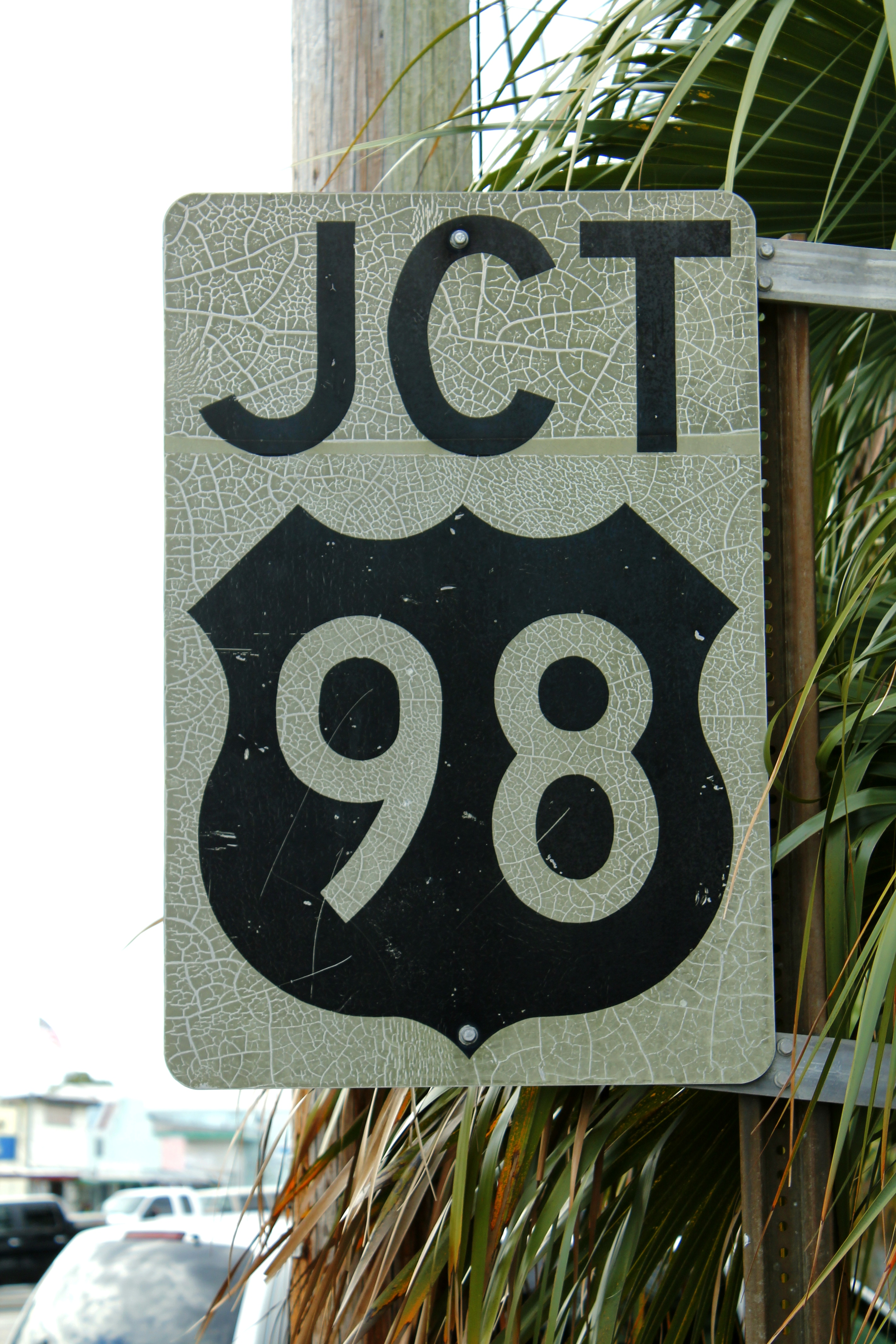
A black US 98 shield used in Florida until 1993.

At the intersection of County Road 44W, the road changes from a six-lane rural divided highway to a four-lane divided highway. The road leaves the city limits south of the Crystal River Airport, and from there US 19-98 passes the intersection of Ozello Trail (CR 494), then serves as the location of a series of car dealerships, local garages, a Moose Lodge, and other businesses. Within Homosassa Springs, the division temporarily ends at Faust Lane across from a bowling alley. The road becomes a four-lane undivided highway with a continuous center left-turn lane, then it overlaps County Road 490. CR 490A terminates at the three-route concurrency with US 19-98-CR 490. South of there, the road passes over a small creek and approaches the Homosassa Springs Wildlife State Park on the west side. Just after the road becomes divided again, the CR 490 concurrency comes to an end, as CR 490 moves onto West Yulee Road and US 19/98 curves to the southeast. Occasionally, some parcels of land that are part of the Chassahowitzka National Wildlife Refuge turn up, but most of the surroundings involve random commercially zoned land. The pattern of sporadic median openings without left-turn lanes resumes, even near a trailer park where such turn lanes would be most useful. It is here that the road turns south again and passes by a popular local flea market. The last developed neighborhood encountered along US 19-98 is deed-restricted community named Sugarmill Woods. Nevertheless, sporadic rural businesses and even residential properties turn up along the sides of the road and the median openings without left-turn lanes continue until the road approaches a Publix shopping center and an abandoned Shell gas station and convenience store in Chassahowitzka. US 98 leaves US 19 at the intersection with County Road 480, which also overlaps US 98 briefly before branching out on its own towards Floral City.

=== Chassahowitzka through Polk County ===
As US 98 breaks away from US 19 at the corner of the Publix in Chassahowitzka, it joins hidden State Road 700, which is momentarily overlapped with County Road 480 before that county road makes a left turn to the northeast towards Floral City. A large portion of this segment of US 98 is a four-lane divided highway though the Citrus-Hernando County Line. After crossing the county line, it meets the current terminus of the Suncoast Parkway, as well as the accompanying Suncoast Trail. The divided section ends between the World Woods Golf Club and the entrance to a Hernando County Landfill. At that point, the road becomes a two-lane undivided highway and runs through Northern Hernando County mining country. Along the way it intersects two county roads at blinker lights. The first is at Deschamps Corner called County Road 491(Citrus Way), a bi-county road spanning north and south from CR 484 north of Spring Hill to Lecanto, Beverly Hills, Holder, and Stokes Ferry in Citrus County. The next is County Road 476(Lake Lindsey Road), another bi-county road spanning east and west from US 19 north of Weeki Wachee through Bushnell, Florida in Sumter County. Southeast of that intersection, it also crosses a former railroad mining spur leading to the CSX Brooksville Subdivision. Just east of a pair of truck weigh stations is the northern terminus of County Road 485, which serves as the beginning of US Truck Route 98. After moving over some steep hills and passing a branch of the Pasco-Hernando Community College as well as a Florida State Trooper police station, US 98 briefly becomes a four-lane divided highway again at Yontz Boulevard, only to resume its status as a two-lane road as it enters the City of Brooksville. There, the road passes by some local industry, including the garage for Hernando ParaTransit and the county bus system, and then faces an un-gated at-grade crossing with the CSX Brooksville Subdivision. Just before the intersection of West Jefferson Avenue (SR 50A), US 98 has a divide that cuts off the intersection of Fort Dade Avenue (County Road 484). The route then turns east and joins SR 50A in a concurrency, while SR 700 continues south along Ponce De Leon Boulevard. Shortly after this new concurrency, it makes a right along North Mildred Avenue, for eastbound traffic only, and both merge with US 41. Between North Mildred Avenue and May Avenue, eastbound SR 50A, US 41, and US 98 are concurrent along Broad Street, while westbound SR 50A, US 41, and US 98 are concurrent along East Jefferson Avenue, then West Jefferson Avenue. US 41 reunites with Broad Street at North Mildred Avenue. This one-way configuration for Broad Street and Jefferson Street has been in effect since November 1993, according to the Florida Department of Transportation. While both segments go up and down steep hills in the heart of the city, the Broad Street (eastbound) section runs over an old railroad bridge over the CSX Brooksville Subdivision, built in 1936.

US 98 continues to overlap SR 50A and US 41 through downtown Brooksville, then makes a sharp right turn off of US 41 onto East Jefferson Street near the May-Stringer House and former Rogers Christmas House. The US 98-SR 50A concurrency continues through the eastern terminus of SR 50A into the west end of a concurrency with SR 50 and hidden route 700, which US 98 becomes concurrent with once again. From there, the speed limit increases to 60 miles per hour as US 98/SR 50 runs southeast through farmland and wooded swampland, then turns straight east again when it runs between a pair of lakebeds before the intersection with CRs 484 and 541. At that point, the road moves up and down a series of hills but first passes by communities such as Rolling Acres and Hill 'n Dale. The hills continue along the road, but along more farms and sparsely populated areas, along with at least one church and later a trailer park. Entering the unincorporated community of Ridge Manor West, commercial development designed primarily for travelers begins to dot the landscape as it approaches the interchange with Interstate 75 at exit 301. US 98-SR 50 is the only interchange along I-75 in Hernando County, and the left-turn lanes leading to the on-ramps are notoriously short. Directly east of I-75 is a development that shares the community's namesake as well as one shopping center.

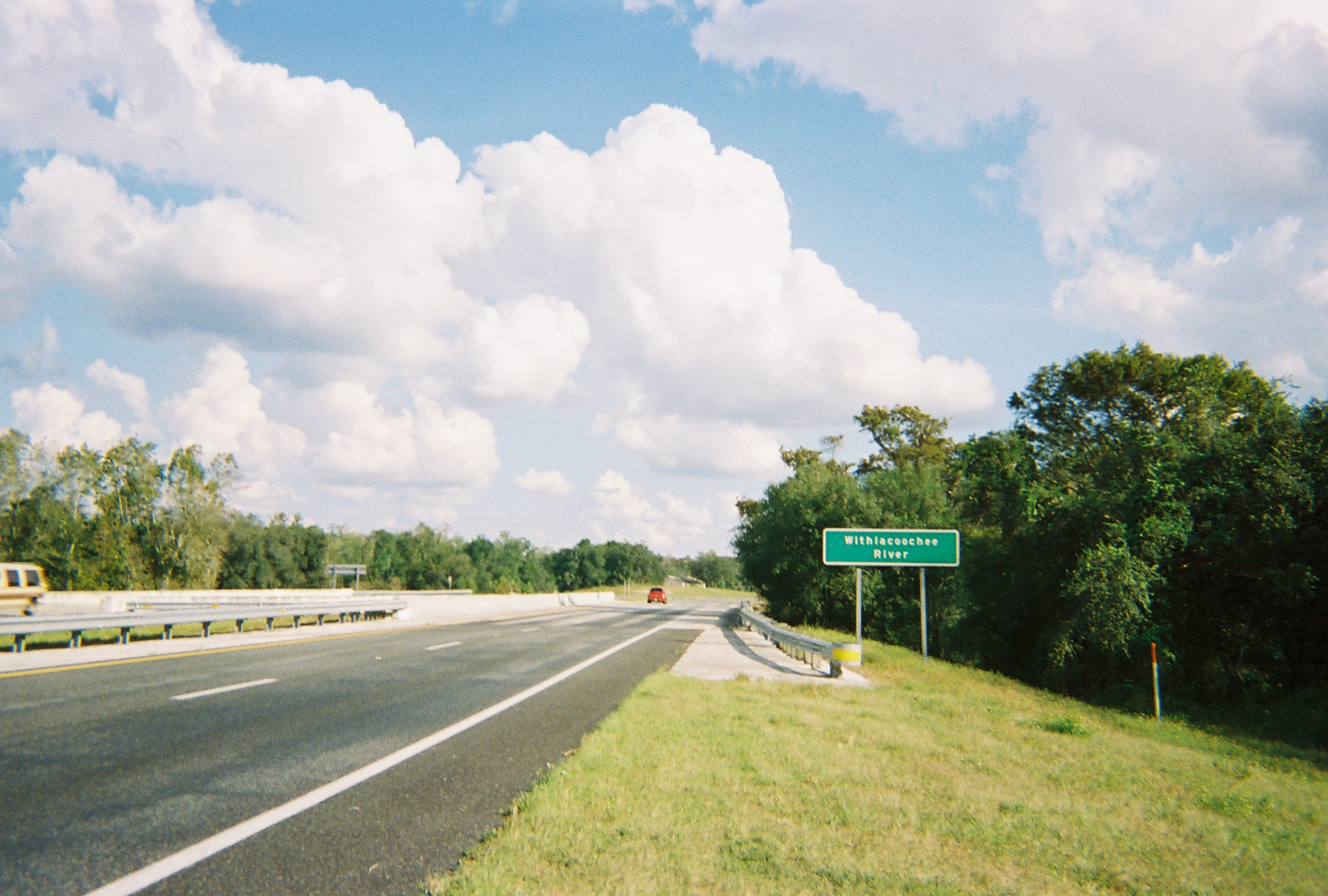
US 98-SR 50 both cross over the Withlacoochee River in Ridge Manor.

The road takes one last drop, only to rise again and officially enter Ridge Manor at the intersection of Kettering Road and Croom-Rital Road which leads to a trailhead for the Withlacoochee State Trail US 98-SR 50 pass under a bridge for this trail. At the crossing over the Withlacoochee River, two former sections of the road exist on the east side of the river; Paul N. Steckle Lane, and Ridge Manor Boulevard. The shorter Paul N. Steckle Lane exists on the north side and contains a Hernando County Firehouse, local residences, and one entrance to the Cypress Lake Preserve. Ridge Manor Boulevard begins on the south side, and crosses over to the north side east of the firehouse and west of the Hernando County Eastside Solid Waste Convenience Station. When SR 50 continues east and narrows down to two lanes toward Clermont, Orlando, and Titusville, US 98 turns southeast and also narrows down to two lanes even as it crosses the Withlacoohcee River for the second time, this time at the Hernando-Pasco County Line, entering Trilby. The first major intersection is a blinker-light intersection with County Road 575, but a far more important one is with US 301 in Trilacoochee, where it shares yet another concurrency running south. South of this point, US 98-301 passes by the Owensboro Junction Trailhead, of the Withlacoochee State Trail. This was once a former junction between the Atlantic Coast Line and Seaboard Air Line Railroads, until both were merged into the Seaboard Coast Line and the segments that crossed Routes 98 and 301 were abandoned. From that point, the road runs up and down a series of hills where it passes by some small motels, local auto repair shops, trailer parks, farms, a Moose Lodge, a local golf course, and a drive-in movie theater. The road officially enters Dade City in the vicinity of the aforementioned drive-in theater, and passes by the Pioneer Florida Museum right next to a former citrus plant. Across from the south end of that plant is the intersection with eastern County Road 578, and shortly afterwards veers to the left at an at-grade interchange onto the former US 98-301 Truck Bypass, which was converted into mainline US 98-301 in 2007. The former segment of US 98-301 is now SR 39 as well as hidden state routes hidden SRs 35-700 and runs into downtown Dade City. US 98-301 moves closer to the CSX Wildwood Subdivision (part of the S-Line), where it encounters the eastern terminus of CR 52 and the Dade City Atlantic Coast Line Railroad Depot. At County Road 35 Alternate, US 98-301 turns from southeast to southwest as it moves back towards another at-grade interchange with the former "Business" US 98-301, and runs straight south again onto a four-lane divided highway. After the intersection with SR 52 in Clinton Heights, US 98 branches off to the southeast taking hidden SR 35 and 700 with it, while US 301(SR 39) continues south towards Zephyrhills, Hillsborough River State Park, and eventually the Manatee-Bradenton-Sarasota area. The road climbs various hills, and includes random farms and trailer parks. The road has another encounter with both CR ALT 35 and the Wildwood Subdivision near Ellerslie, at a bridge over both, and an unnumbered interchange with the former of these two. Continuing southeast, the road encounters fewer farms and approaches the western edges of the Green Swamp, where it encounters the northernmost bridge over the Hillsborough River, which is nothing more than an elevated culvert. At the Pasco-Polk County Line, the road becomes the eastern terminus of County Road 54, and then the southern terminus of State Road 471.

=== Polk County through Okeechobee ===
Running southeast from the Pasco-Polk border, US 98 remains rural, but eventually becomes more suburban as it enters communities such as Providence, where the road turns straight south, becomes a divided highway, and serves as the northern terminus of County Road 35A, a suffixed alternate of hidden SR 35 leading through Kathleen. Farther south the road becomes the official eastern terminus of County Road 582, a bi-county extension of State Road 582 in Hillsborough and Pinellas County, which for the time being runs east then curves back around to another intersection farther south. US 98 officially enters Lakeland, then the road curves southeast again before the interchange with Interstate 4 (Exit 32), after this interchange CR 582 is encountered again at the intersection of Griffin Road. 9/10 of a mile later, the road turns straight south and becomes North Florida Avenue. According to the Florida Department of Transportation, the northern terminus of State Road 563 can be found at 10th Street, in spite of the fact that signage for that road can only be found at the next major intersection, U.S. Route 92, which until 2005 was also the west end of a brief concurrency with US 98 east to Lake Parker Avenue. Since then the route has been rerouted south along North Florida Avenue until it reaches the intersection of State Road 37 and State Road 548, where US 98 turns east onto SR 548. US 98/SR 548 curves from east to southeast over a bridge over the two railroad lines that feed into Lakeland Amtrak station just west of this bridge, and follows the southwest side of one of those lines which leads to Miami. The first intersection at ground level south of this bridge is East Main Street (former U.S. Route 92 Business). The next major intersection is Lake Parker Avenue (hidden SR 700) and Hollingsworth Road where SR 548 terminates and SR 700 rejoins US 98 as the hidden route once again. Long after passing the southwestern shore of Lake Bonny, US 98/SRs 35/700 encounters the southern terminus of State Road 659 (former SR 33A). Shortly after this intersection, the road prepares to leave the Lakeland city limits beneath the partial cloverleaf interchange with Polk Parkway at Exit 10, which contains loop ramps only from US 98. This interchange is within a mere block of the western terminus of State Road 540, although that route secretly has a concurrency with US 98 until it reaches Highland City, and moves to the west as County Road 540.

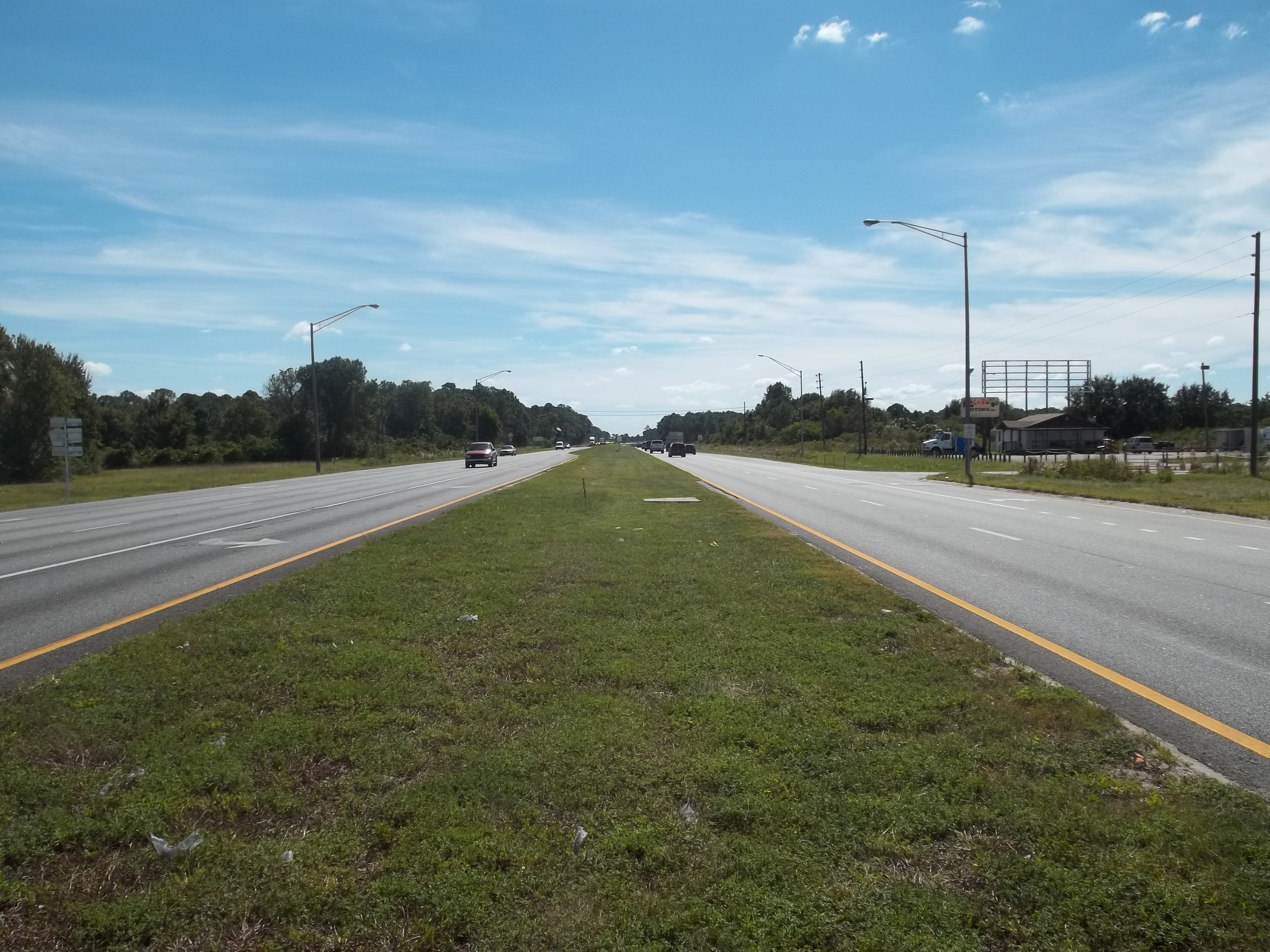
CR 630/US 27/US 98 intersection, looking south

Southwest of Lake Hancock, the road begins to skirt the borders of Bartow, first along a residential area on the west side, then south from there around the vicinity of Bartow Regional Medical Center. The road doesn't fully enter that city until the intersection of Lyle Parkway, where it turns from southeast to straight south once again. US 98 intersects SR 60 which also has a hidden concurrency with CR 555. SR 700 continues straight south into downtown Bartow as CR 700, while US 98 turns east along SR 60. SR 60 branches off to the southeast while US 98/SR 35/SR 555 continues straight east and later intersects US 17, where SR 555 becomes the hidden route for US 17 north into Haines City, while US 98/SR 35 turns south at the beginning of a concurrency. After running over a bridge for SR 60 and a railroad line, US 17-98 encounters CR 700 at Main Street (former SR 60), and SR 700 becomes a hidden route along US 98 again. The rest of the way through southern Bartow, US 17/98 remains mostly a commercial strip, but this status begins to diminish around the intersection of South Clear Springs Road. Eventually it enters the unincorporated community of Homeland which contains an intersection with CR 640, where to the east of this you'll find the Mosaic Peace River Park. In Fort Meade US 98/SR 700 leaves US 17/SR 35 and turns east again, secretly taking CR 630 with it. All three routes leave Fort Meade at the bridge over the Peace River where it becomes Frostproof Boulevard. In this segment, US 98/SR 700/CR 630 has two sharp reverse curves to the south and east, the first being near Pleasant Grove Cemetery, and a much larger one near Lake Hendry Road. After these curves, the route remains relatively straight west and east and after crossing the CSX Railroad Line that is used by Amtrak's Silver Star and Silver Meteor lines, it has another intersection with US 27 in West Frostproof, where it turns south once again onto yet another US route concurrency. County Road 630 continues to the east. From here, the hidden routes are SR 25 and SR 700.

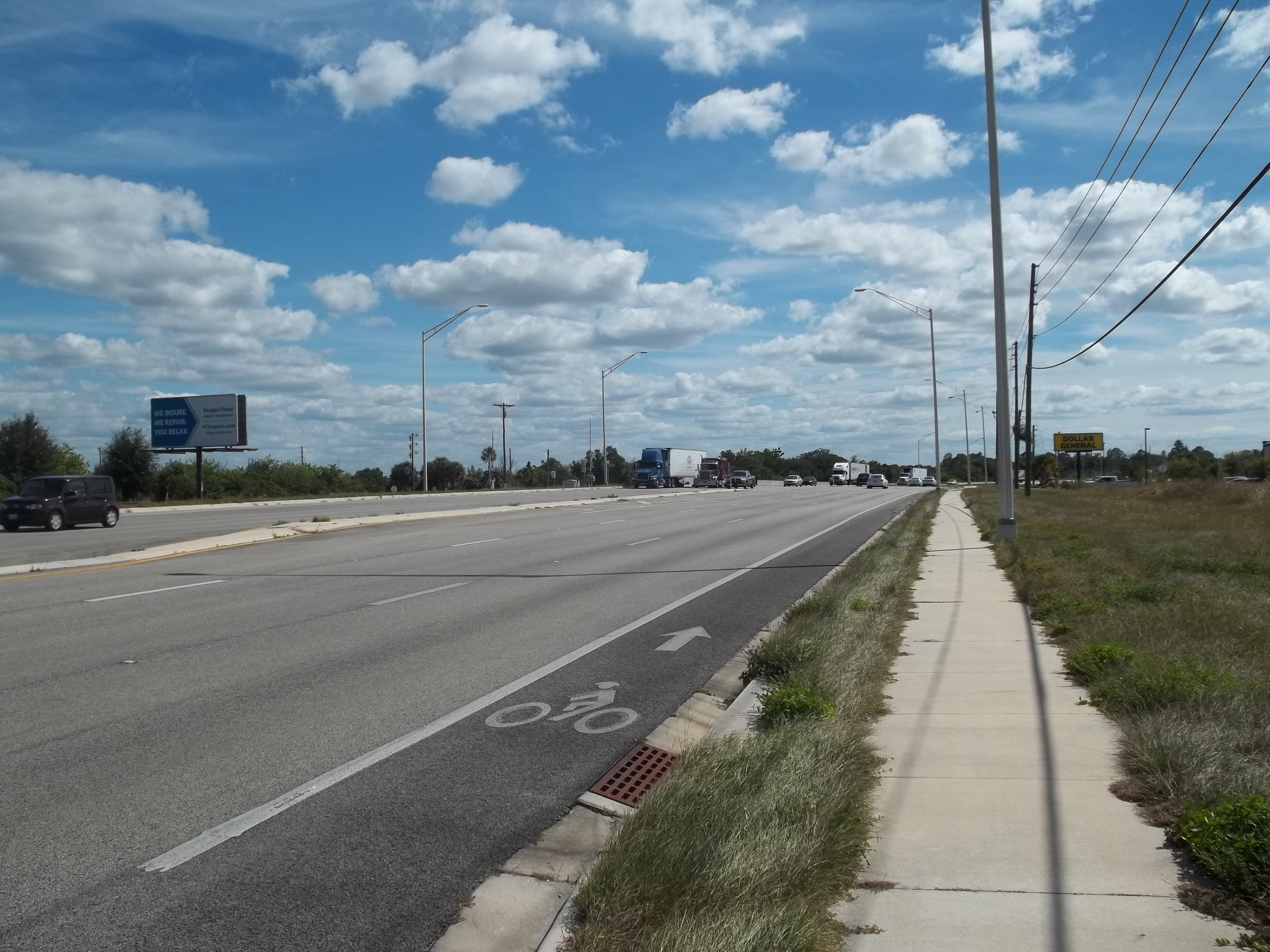
US 27/US 98 at Lake Lillian Drive, looking south

Within Frostproof itself, US 27/98 makes a reverse curve onto a bridge over the same CSX line that serves the Silver Star and Silver Meteor, and then enters an unincorporated community named Sunray Deli Estates, where the route first encounters State Road 17, a scenic Florida Highway that was designated US 27 Alternate until 1999. However, the route continues as county extension to the southwest that loops right back to US 27/98. South of here, US 98 carries hidden state routes (SRs 17, 25 and 700) into Highlands County until it reaches Avon Park, where SR 17 (another former US 27 Alternate) breaks away again at the eastern terminus of State Road 64, and runs relatively parallel to US 27 until it reaches Sebring. SR 64 continues east along part of SR 17 as a bi-county extension northeast into Polk County which runs through Lake Wales Ridge State Forest and terminates at the Avon Park Air Force Range. US 27/98 meanwhile, continues to run south to southeast along the shores of Lake Glenda where it passes through South Florida Community College territory, and then Lake Sebring and Lake Jackson. Curving to the east around the southern shores of Lake Jackson, the route encounters a wye intersection in Sebring, where the second southern terminus of State Road 17 can be found. The commercial zoning that has lined US 27/98 since Avon Park begins to diminish south of Sebring, but doesn't completely disappear. US 98 and hidden SR 700 leaves US 27 at the eastern terminus of State Road 66, thus joining the Florida Cracker Trail in the process, while US 27/SR 25 continue southbound towards Miami.

Running east, this segment of US 98 is two lanes wide, and shortly after leaving a concurrency with US 27 encounters another with another CR 17, this time a county spur of SR 17 that spans from north of Lake Henry to Sebring. For the time being, US 98 takes CR 17 around the southern shores of Red Beach Lake, and lets go of the concurrency before it stops running along that lake. East of here, it encounters a grade crossing with the CSX line that carries the Silver Star and Silver Meteor yet again, just before intersecting the road that leads to both Sebring Regional Airport and Sebring International Raceway. After these two sites, the road runs along the north shore of Lake Istokpoga, where it passes through Lorida. Beyond the lake, the road serves as the northern terminus of CR 621, but later enters the barely existing unincorporated community of Fort Basinger as it encounters the northern terminus of CR 721, while making a sharp curve to the northeast to cross a bridge over the Kissimmee River where it crosses the Highlands-Okeechobee County Line. Momentarily running northeast, the first moderate intersection that US 98 encounters is a segment of County Road 68 in Basinger, where it curves southeast and shares yet another concurrency. Along the way, two county suffixed alternates of hidden SR 700 can be found, first 700B, which leads to Basinger Cemetery, and then 700A, which leads to the Basigner Fire Tower and CR 724. The Florida Cracker Trail branches off to the northeast at CR 68, which eventually leads to its state designation in Fort Pierce. Meanwhile, US 98 continues to run south through rural Okeechobee County, but the rural atmosphere of the road begins to disappear after CR 718, especially near the Okeechobee County Airport. The next major site is yet again a grade crossing with the CSX railroad line that carries the Amtrak Silver Star through Okeechobee station. Between Northwest Fifth and Northwest Fourth Streets, US 98 finally turns straight south, only to encounter a major intersection with State Road 70, where it turns left into another concurrency, running east and officially entering the City of Okeechobee. After crossing a railroad spur leading to the vicinity of the Amtrak station, US 98 leaves SR 70 at the intersection of U.S. Route 441, where it turns south.

=== Lake Okeechobee to Palm Beach Area ===
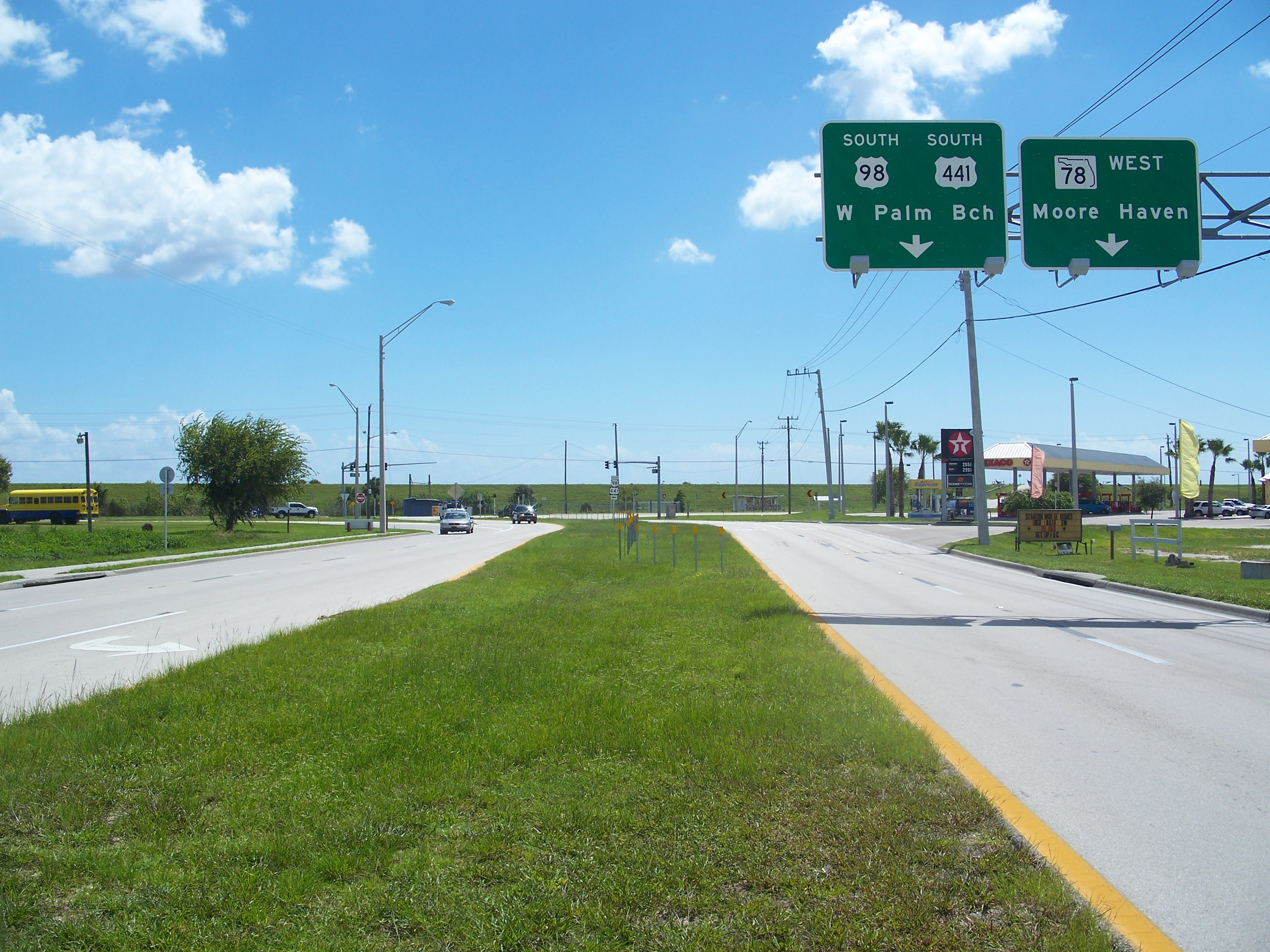
US 98/441 prepares to run along the coast of Lake Okeechobee at the eastern terminus of SR 78 south of Okeechobee.

US 98/441 runs straight south out of the Okeechobee City Limits, along with its hidden state roads 700 and 15 respectively. This trajectory continues until the routes reach Eagle Bay and the road encounters a T-intersection with State Road 78 on the northern shores of Lake Okeechobee. There, US 98/441 makes a sharp left turn to the northeast and then the southeast as it runs along the east side of the lake as well as the levee system protecting the coast. Along this segment, the two hidden state roads aren't exactly as hidden as they are in other parts of the state. Two suffixed alternate routes of hidden State Road 15 can be found in Up-the-Grove Junction before the route enters Martin County, where it remains along the east side of the lake.

Upon crossing the Okeechobee-Martin county line, US 98 fully returns to east-west direction banners. As the route enters Port Mayaca, the road crosses a bridge over the St. Lucie Canal that returns to ground level at the interchange with State Road 76. Shortly after this, US 98/441 crosses the Martin-Palm Beach County line just north of a Florida East Coast Railroad grade crossing with no signs indicating the location of the border. Winding around the shores of the lake, the road eventually turns to the southwest.

In Canal Point, US 98/441 is named Lakeshore Drive and briefly curves to the east from Lakeshore Drive to West Main Street. A block later, SR 700 breaks away from US 98 for the fourth and final time at a blinker-light intersection, where the two U.S. Routes, as well as not-so-hidden SR 15, make a right onto East Main Street and resumes it southwest run along the coast of Lake Okeechobee, or at least within close range of the levees. The road keeps the name East Main Street well into its entry into City of Pahokee, where it serves as the northern terminus of State Road 729, which was once a segment of State Road 15A. The FEC line that runs along this segment has a grade crossing southwest of this, and runs parallel to that route. Though not necessarily state or county roads, some of the more prominent intersections in town include Larrimore Road and South Barfield Highway. Further downtown, the road makes a left turn to the south from Main Street to Lake Avenue and a block later serves as the northern terminus of State Road 715 across from the Pahokee City Hall, which also continues onto East First Street. At the intersection of McClure Road, Lake Avenue curves to the east and becomes East Seventh Avenue. Aside from South Barfield Highway, every other intersection with this segment is a residential street. East 7th Avenue then curves from east to south at another FEC grade crossing on the southwest corner of the southern terminus of State Road 729 near the western terminus of CR 717. South of that point, the road is named Belle Glade Road and later makes another reverse curve to the west and south again along the east side of that FEC line before eventually approaching Belle Glade. Before reaching the city limits though, US 98/441 makes a sharp left turn to the east at the intersection of the Hooker Highway, where State Road 80 joins the route, while SR 15 continues south along westbound SR 80.

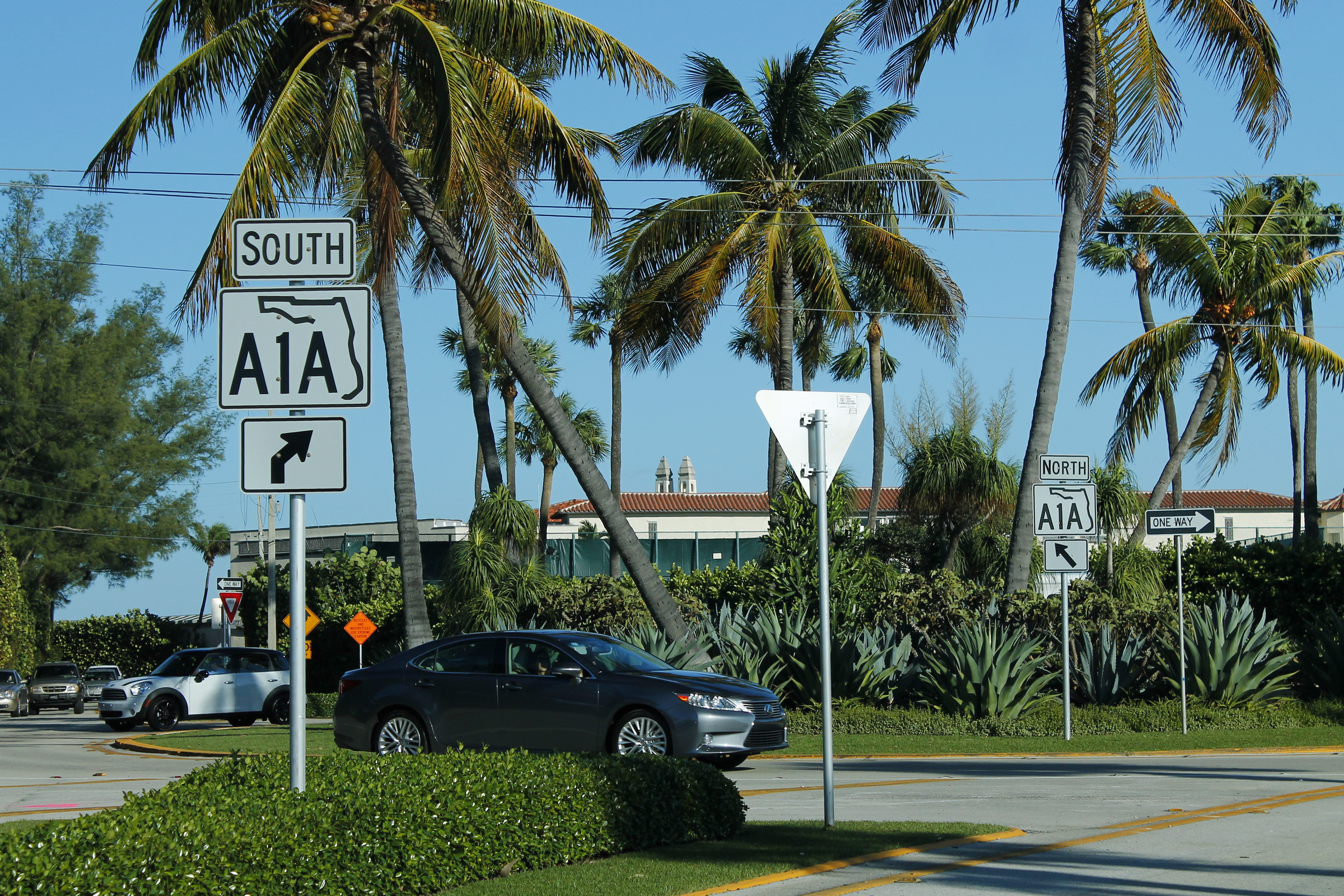
Eastern terminus in Palm Beach

Between Belle Glade and Loxahatchee, US 98/441/SR 80 are surrounded by sugarcane fields. In Twenty Mile Bend, State Road 700 ends at US 98, and later CR 880 terminates at the route. Lion Country Safari marks the beginning of a rural to urban transition of the road for the remainder of its journey. The road doubles from four to eight lanes in Royal Palm Beach, as the road serves as the border between Royal Palm Beach and Wellington. At the State Road 7 interchange, US 441 turns south towards Miami. The South Florida Fairgrounds and the Coral Skys Amphitheatre, where the South Florida Fair takes place, are next on the route, just east of SR 7. After passing Florida's Turnpike, it gains two more lanes and becomes an expressway, with diamond interchanges with Jog Road, Haverhill Road and Military Trail. East of Military Trail, it loses a lane in each direction as it straddles the southern end of Palm Beach International Airport, where private aircraft are serviced, with commercial access to the airport available via SR 704A. It then approaches a bridge over the Tri-Rail main line as it intersects the service roads for I-95 at Exit 68, then becomes a four-lane road in several older, high-density neighborhoods in West Palm Beach. East of the Florida East Coast Railroad Main Line bridge crossing, it intersects US 1 and SR 5, reducing to two lanes as it crosses Lake Worth Lagoon on two bridges, and ending on a roundabout with SR A1A in Palm Beach near the Mar-a-Lago estate, which is next to the southern terminus of US 98 at SR A1A, in Palm Beach.

== History ==
=== Conners Highway ===
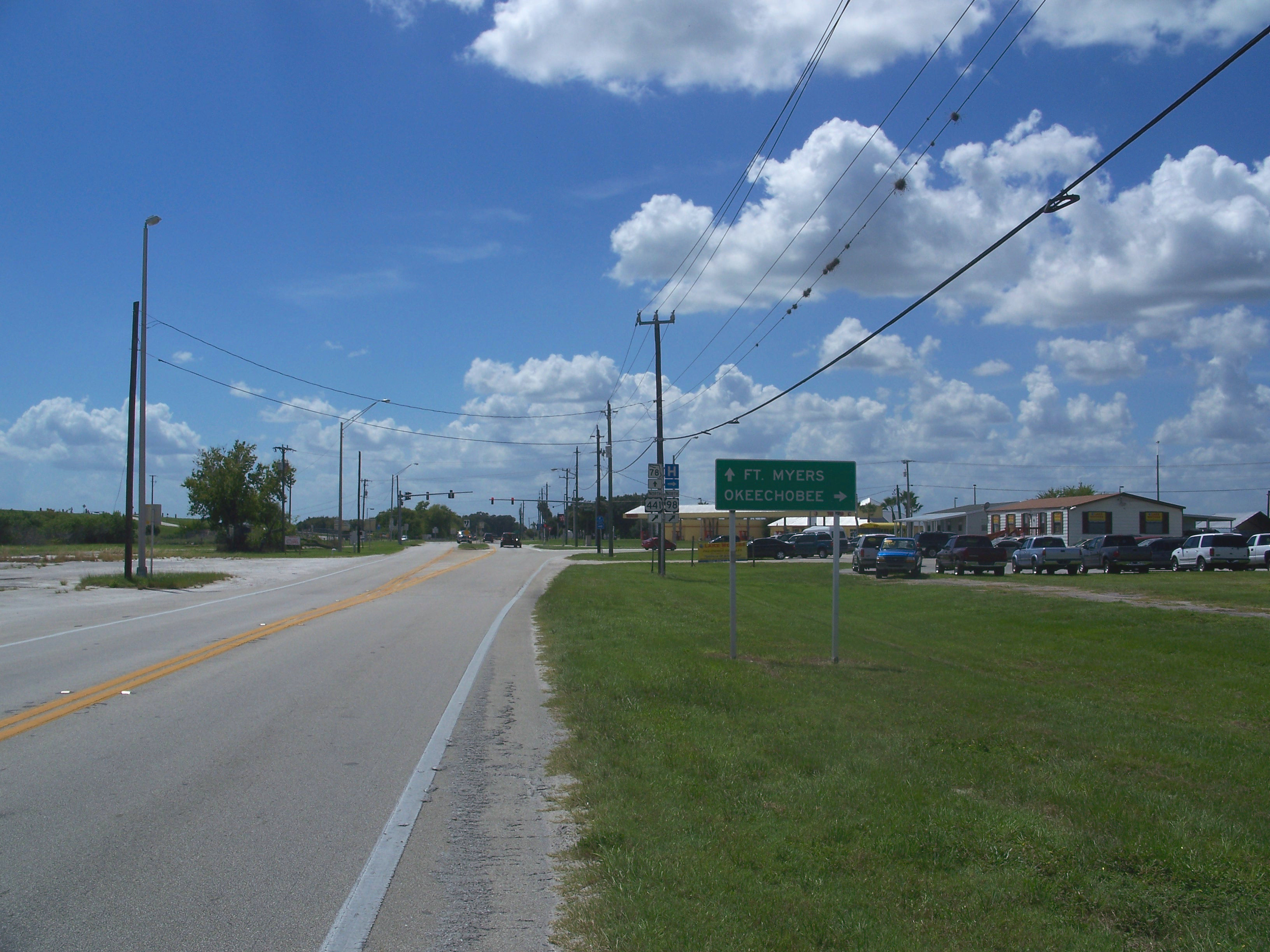
US 98, on the north side of Lake Okeechobee, looking west towards the intersection with SR 78

Prior to the designation of US 98 in Florida, sections of the route in the southern part of the state were part of the Conners Highway. The Conners Highway or W. P. Conners Highway was a privately built toll road from West Palm Beach, Florida to Okeechobee, Florida, and a free continuation of the road to Tampa, Florida. It cost $2 million to build across the swamps at the outskirts of the Everglades.

The toll section had three toll booths, at 20 Mile Bend, Canal Point and south of Okeechobee. It was opened on July 4, 1924. The last section of the full route to be paved, from Okeechobee to Sebring, was paved in 1925.

A toll of $1.50 per car and driver, and 50 cents extra per passenger, was charged at each toll booth. The route also included the Williams Ferry across the Kissimmee River west of Okeechobee, which charged 50 cents.

The highway was advertised as a cross-state alternate to the unpaved Tamiami Trail, also part of the west mainline of the Dixie Highway. Parts of it, including the tolled section, were used as the South Florida Connector of the Dixie Highway.

Tolls were removed on June 10, 1930.

=== The early years of US 98 ===
US 98 was first commissioned in 1934 and its entire route was within Florida, running from Pensacola to Apalachicola but over a route quite different from its current path.

Historical US 92 route markers

1927 design

1948 design

1956–1993, black highway shields

=== Eastward extension ===
In 1951, the eastern end was extended to its present terminus in Palm Beach, Florida. Much of this extension was (and is) concurrent with other US routes. From Apalachicola, it followed the path of US 319 to Wakulla (which it was then cosigned with), then along new State Road 30 across the lower Big Bend to Perry. From 1952-54, while this section was being built, Temporary US 98 ran from Wakulla to Tallahassee on US 319, and then along US 27 east to Perry.

From Perry, US 98 was extended southward concurrently with US 19 for over 125 miles (200 km) to near Chassahowitzka where it was routed southeastward to Brooksville and eastward on State Road 50 to near Trilby where it left Route 50 and turned south. US 98 met US 301 south of Trilby and was extended southward concurrently with US 301 to south of Dade City where it followed State Road 35 to Fort Meade, joined by US 17 at Bartow. From Fort Meade, US 98 turned eastward to a junction with US 27 at West Frostproof from where it followed US 27 concurrently southward. From DeSoto City, US 98 was again sent east along the path of State Road 66 to State Road 70 near Okeechobee and then along Road 70 into Okeechobee. From there, US 98 was routed concurrently with the then recently extended US 441 to Canal Point. From Canal Point, it replaced State Road 716 to the junction with US 441 at Twenty Mile Bend and then followed the path of US 441 and State Road 80 to its terminus at Palm Beach. The final sections from Canal Point to Palm Beach were designated Temporary US 98 until the early 1960s, because a relocation was planned via SR 710 through Indiantown.

=== Westward extension ===
In 1955, US 98 was extended westward from Pensacola into Alabama over what is now State Road 298, locally known as Lillian Highway. US 98 retained this routing until sometime after 1965 when it was routed along its current routing south of Naval Air Station Pensacola, Corry Station (formally known as Naval Auxiliary Air Station (NAAS) Corry Field). The airfield at NAAS Corry Field closed in 1958, opening the way for a southern routing of US 98. The current alignment continues west from its intersection with State Road 298 and is four lanes from its intersection with Blue Angle Parkway to the intersection with Navy Boulevard. The four-lane section from Navy Hospital to Navy Boulevard is routed along the southern most taxiway from the old NAAS Corry Field airfied.

=== Later changes ===
Following the extensions of the 1950s, minor changes were made in the routing of US 98. Several of these involved the construction of bypass routes (in Panama City, Dade City, Lakeland, and Bartow) or straightening alignments (near Lakeland and Bartow). Around 1990, US 441 was realigned onto new road from north of Belle Glade to Twenty Mile Bend and, by the late 2000s, US 98 was transferred to this route as well, the most significant rerouting of US 98 in Florida in nearly half a century. The former path of US 98 from Canal Point is now signed as State Road 700 north of the junction with US 98/US 441 and County Route 700 south of that to County Road 880.

FDOT announced in January 2010, near the end of the Pensacola Bay Bridge's 50-year design life, that the bridge was structurally deficient and would have to be replaced within six years. As of 2011, a study is underway to determine the "feasibility, location, and conceptual design" of a replacement bridge. As of February 2013, plans have begun to replace the bridge with construction beginning within two years, at a cost of $595.6 million, on a course slightly to the west of the existing bridge. The new bridge, like the current one, will not charge a toll. As of February 2020, construction of the new bridge is complete with only the pedestrian portion to be completed with the old bridge being dismantled to make way for the parallel bridge to begin construction. However, just months later during Hurricane Sally on September 15-16, 2020, a barge got stuck under the bridge before a crane fell onto one span of the bridge; this knocked almost the entire span into Pensacola Bay, rendering the bridge completely unusable; creating a temporarily gap on US 98; repairs were quickly arranged, the bridge reopened to traffic on May 28, 2021.

== Major intersections ==
County	Location	mi	km	Exit	Destinations	Notes
Perdido Bay		0.000	0.000		US 98 west (SR 42) – Mobile	Continuation into Alabama
Perdido Bay		0.000	0.000		Lillian Bridge; SR 30 begins	
Escambia	Millview	1.967	3.166		CR 293 south (Bauer Road) – Big Lagoon State Park, Tarkiln Bayou Preserve State Park	
Escambia	Millview	3.583	5.766		SR 298 east (Lillian Highway) / CR 297 south (Dog Track Road) – Myrtle Grove, Dog track	
Escambia		5.474	8.810		SR 173 (Blue Angel Pkwy) – Naval Aviation Museum, truck route to NAS Pensacola	
Escambia		6.962	11.204		SR 727 (Fairfield Drive)	
Escambia	West Pensacola	9.418	15.157		SR 295 south (Navy Boulevard) – NAS Pensacola, Naval Aviation Museum	West end of SR 295 overlap
Escambia	West Pensacola	9.679	15.577		SR 295 north (New Warrington Road)	East end of SR 295 overlap
Escambia	West Pensacola	10.013	16.114		CR 295A (Old Corry Field Road)	
Escambia	West Pensacola	10.113	16.275		SR 294 west (Chiefs' Way)	no left turn eastbound
Escambia	Pensacola	11.504	18.514		CR 453 north (W Street)	
Escambia	Pensacola	12.049	19.391		US 98 Bus. east (Garden Street / SR 30) / SR 292 begins	East end of SR 30 overlap; west end of SR 292 overlap
Escambia	Pensacola	12.520	20.149		Jackson Street (CR 298A west)	
Escambia	Pensacola	12.657	20.369		US 90 west (Cervantes Street west/ SR 10A) / SR 292 north (Pace Boulevard north)	East end of SR 292 overlap; west end of US 90/SR 10A overlap
Escambia	Pensacola	13.325	21.445		E Street (CR 443 north)	
Escambia	Pensacola	14.094	22.682		US 29 (Palafox Street / SR 95)	Southern terminus of US 29
Escambia	Pensacola	14.29	23.00		I-110 north (SR 8A)	I-110 exit 2
Escambia	Pensacola	14.416	23.200		SR 291 south (Alcaniz Street)	One-way street; Dr. Martin Luther King Drive feeds into Alcaniz St.
Escambia	Pensacola	14.489	23.318		SR 291 north (Davis Street)	One-way street
Escambia	Pensacola	14.719	23.688		US 90 east (Cervantes Street / SR 10A) / 9th Avenue (SR 289 north)	East end of US 90/SR 10A overlap; west end of SR 289 overlap
Escambia	Pensacola	15.215	24.486		SR 289 ends / US 98 Bus. west (Gregory Street / SR 30) to I-110 / I-10 – Airport	East end of SR 289 overlap; west end of SR 30 overlap
Escambia	Pensacola	15.575	25.066		SR 196 west (Bayfront Parkway) – Port of Pensacola	
Pensacola Bay		18	29		Pensacola Bay Bridge	
Santa Rosa	Gulf Breeze	20.77	33.43		SR 399 south (Scenic Route) to CR 399 – Pensacola Beach, Fort Pickens	Trumpet interchange
Santa Rosa		25.234	40.610		CR 191A south (Oriole Beach Road)	
Santa Rosa		26.944	43.362		SR 281 north (Garcon Point Bridge) to I-10	
Santa Rosa		28.182	45.355		CR 191B south (Soundside Drive)	
Santa Rosa		30.057	48.372		CR 191C south (Nantahala Beach Road)	
Santa Rosa		30.997	49.885		CR 399 east (East Bay Boulevard)	
Santa Rosa		31.197	50.207		Woodlawn Beach Road (CR 191D south)	
Santa Rosa	Navarre	38.703	62.286		SR 87 north to I-10 – Milton, Dixonville	
Santa Rosa	Navarre	39.160	63.022		CR 399 south (Navarre Beach Causeway) – Navarre Beach	
Okaloosa	Mary Esther	51.704	83.210		SR 393 north (Mary Esther Boulevard) – Wright, Eglin AFB, Mary Esther Business District, NW Florida Regional Airport	
Okaloosa	Fort Walton Beach	54.268	87.336		SR 189 north (Beal Parkway) to SR 85 north – Troy University	
Okaloosa	Fort Walton Beach	54.501	87.711		SR 85 Truck north (Eglin Parkway)	
Okaloosa	Fort Walton Beach	54.715	88.055		SR 85 north (Florida Place) – Destin–Fort Walton Beach Airport	No outbound access eastbound
Okaloosa	Fort Walton Beach	54.822	88.227		SR 145 north (Perry Avenue) – To Brooks Street south of US 98	
Okaloosa	Okaloosa Island	55.1	88.7		Brooks Bridge over Santa Rosa Sound	
Okaloosa	Okaloosa Island	60.3	97.0		Destin Bridge over the East Pass	
Okaloosa	Destin	60.604	97.533		Calhoun Avenue (CR 30A east)	
Okaloosa	Destin	63.759	102.610		CR 2378 east – Beaches	
Okaloosa	Destin	65.919	106.086		SR 293 north (Mid-Bay Bridge) to SR 20 / I-10 – Niceville, Northwest Florida Regional Airport, Maxwell Gunter Recreation Area, Rocky Bayou State Park	
Walton	Miramar Beach	70.709	113.795		CR 2378 west – Beaches	
Walton		73.383	118.098		CR 457 north (Mack Bayou Road)	
Walton		75.126	120.904		CR 30A east – Topsail Hill Preserve State Park, Deer Lake State Park	
Walton	Santa Rosa Beach	77.913	125.389		CR 393 – Dune Allen Beach	
Walton		79.945	128.659		CR 83 south – Blue Mountain Beach	
Walton		80.893	130.185		US 331 north (SR 83) to I-10 – Freeport	
Walton		82.417	132.637		CR 283 – Grayton Beach, Seaside, Watercolor, Grayton Beach State Park	
Walton		83.985	135.161		CR 395 – Point Washington, Seagrove Beach, Watercolor, Eden State Gardens	
Walton	Inlet Beach	93.487	150.453		CR 30A west – Rosemary Beach, Deer Lake State Park	
Bay		95.983	154.470		SR 30 east (Scenic Route) – Beaches; SR 30A (Panama City Beach Parkway) begins	East end of SR 30 overlap; west end of SR 30A overlap/Panama City Beach Pkwy.; former US 98 Alt. east
Bay	Laguna Beach	98.318	158.227	M	Beaches via Twin Lakes Drive	At-grade intersections
Bay	Laguna Beach	98.690	158.826	L	Beaches via Wisteria Lane (CR 3037 south)	At-grade intersections
Bay	Laguna Beach	99.517	160.157	K	Beaches via Toledo Place	At-grade intersections
Bay	Panama City Beach	100.857	162.314	J	Beaches via Cobb Road	At-grade intersections
Bay	Panama City Beach	101.767	163.778		SR 79 to I-10 – Northwest Florida Beaches International Airport, Westbay, Dog track, Beaches	
Bay	Upper Grand Lagoon				SR 30 (Front Beach Road) to Thomas Drive (CR 3031 south) – NSA Main Gate, Bay Point	Interchange; eastbound exit only
Bay	Upper Grand Lagoon	109.931	176.917		SR 30A (Panama City Beach Parkway) ends SR 30 west (Front Beach Road)	Interchange; east end of SR 30A overlap/Panama City Beach Pkwy.; west end of SR 30 overlap; former US 98 Alt. west
Bay	Upper Grand Lagoon	110.100	177.189		Thomas Drive (CR 3031 south) – NSA PC, BAY POINT, Marinas	Interchange; no eastbound exit
Bay	St. Andrews Bay	111.2	179.0		Hathaway Bridge	
Bay	Panama City	112.192	180.556		SR 368 east – Port PC	
Bay	Panama City	113.859	183.238		US 98 Bus. east (SR 30 east) / SR 390 east (Beck Avenue); SR 30A begins	East end of SR 30 overlap; west end of SR 30A overlap; no eastbound access to SR 390
Bay	Panama City	114.491	184.255		CR 385 (Frankford Avenue)	
Bay	Panama City	114.995	185.067		CR 327 (Lisenby Avenue)	
Bay	Panama City	116.406	187.337		US 231 (Harrison Avenue / SR 75) – Youngstown, Historic Downtown Panama City	
Bay	Panama City	117.000	188.293		SR 77 (Martin Luther King Jr. Boulevard) to US 231	
Bay	Cedar Grove	118.009	189.917		CR 2337 (Sherman Avenue) to US 231	
Bay	Cedar Grove	118.508	190.720		SR 389 (East Avenue) to US 231 – Lynn Haven	
Bay	Springfield	119.539	192.379		CR 2327 (Transmitter Road) to US 231	
Bay	Springfield–Callaway line	120.879	194.536		CR 28 west (11th Street)	
Bay	Callaway	121.873	196.136		SR 22 – Wewahitchka, Springfield	
Bay	Parker–Callaway line	123.672	199.031		SR 30A ends US 98 Bus. west (SR 30) – Springfield	East end of SR 30A overlap; west end of SR 30 overlap
Bay	East Bay	125.6	202.1		Dupont Bridge	
Bay	Mexico Beach	144.231	232.117		CR 386 north	
Gulf	Port St. Joe	152.812	245.927		CR 382 east (Industrial Road)	
Gulf	Port St. Joe	153.923	247.715		SR 71 north (Cecil G. Costin Sr. Boulevard) – Wewahitchka, Marianna, Downtown Port St. Joe	
Gulf	Port St. Joe	155.440	250.156		CR 384 (Madison Street) – Oak Grove, St. Joseph Cemetery	
Gulf		156.033	251.111		SR 30A east – Cape San Blas, St. Joseph Bay State Buffer Preserve	
Gulf		157.490	253.456		CR 30A west – Gulf Coast Community College Gulf/Franklin County Campus	
Franklin		169.164	272.243		CR 30 west – St. Joseph Peninsula State Park, St. Joseph Bay State Buffer Preserve	Former SR 30A
Franklin		170.644	274.625		CR 385 north (Tilton Road) – Box-R Wildlife Management Area	
Franklin	Apalachicola	176.478	284.014		CR 384 west (12th Street)	
Franklin	Apalachicola River	177.6– 177.980	285.8– 286.431		John Gorrie Memorial Bridge	
Franklin		177.980	286.431		US 319 begins	West end of US 319 overlap at base of John Gorrie Bridge
Franklin	Apalachicola Bay	178.78– 181.48	287.72– 292.06		Apalachicola Bay Bridge	
Franklin	Eastpoint	183.059	294.605		SR 300 south (St. George Island Bridge) – St. George Island, St. George Island State Park, Cape St. George Light	
Franklin	Green Point	186.720	300.497		SR 65 north – Hosford, Sumatra, Apalachicola National Forest	
Franklin	Carrabelle	198.112	318.830		CR 376 east (Timber Island Road) – Florida Fish and Wildlife Conservation Commission	
Franklin	Carrabelle	198.388	319.275		CR 379 north (River Road)	
Franklin	Carrabelle	198.6	319.6		Tillie Miller Bridge over Carrabelle River	
Franklin	Carrabelle	199.437	320.963		Tallahassee Street (CR 67 north) – Apalachicola National Forest	
Franklin		209.555	337.246		US 319 north (SR 377) – Sopchoppy, Ochlockonee River State Park	East end of US 319 overlap
Franklin		218.638	351.864		CR 370 east (Alligator Drive) – Alligator Point	
Ochlockonee Bay		220.5– 221.013	354.9– 355.686		Ochlockonee Bay Bridge	
Wakulla	Ochlockonee Bay	221.013	355.686		SR 61 begins	West end of SR 61 overlap at base of Ochlockonee Bay Bridge
Wakulla	Ochlockonee Bay	221.107	355.837		CR 372 – Mashes Sands Beach, Airport	
Wakulla	Medart	228.791	368.203		US 319 south (SR 375) – Sopchoppy, Ochlockonee River State Park	West end of US 319 overlap
Wakulla		230.350	370.712		US 319 north (SR 61) – Tallahassee, Crawfordville	East end of US 319/SR 61 overlap
Wakulla		235.340	378.743		CR 365 (Spring Creek Highway) – Shell Point, Spring Creek, Live Oak Island	
Wakulla		242.561	390.364		SR 363 – Tallahassee, St. Marks, San Marcos de Apalache Historic State Park	
Wakulla	Newport	244.594	393.636		SR 267 north to SR 20 – Wakulla, Edward Ball Wakulla Springs State Park	
Wakulla	Newport	245.100	394.450		CR 59 south (Lighthouse Road) – St. Marks National Wildlife Refuge, St. Marks Lighthouse	
Jefferson		252.661	406.618		SR 59 north – Wacissa	
Taylor		262.994	423.248		CR 14 (Econfina River Road / Aucilla River Road) – Econfina River State Park	
Taylor	Hampton Springs	278.989	448.989		CR 356 west (Hampton Springs Road) – Taylor Correctional Institution	
Taylor		280.688	451.724		CR 359B north (Osteen Road)	
Taylor		281.922	453.709		CR 359 south (Golf Course Road)	
Taylor	Perry	283.185	455.742		US 19 / US 27 / US 221 (Byron Butler Parkway north / SR 20 west) – Tallahassee US 27 south (Hampton Springs Avenue / SR 20 east) US 27 Alt. begins	North end of US 19 / US 27 Alt. / US 221 Truck overlap; Cardinal direction change from east-west to north-south
see US 19 (mile 214.672-88.418)
Citrus		409.439	658.928		US 19 south (Suncoast Boulevard / SR 55) / CR 480 west (Miss Maggie Drive) – Weeki Wachee, St. Petersburg, Chassahowitzka; SR 700 begins	South end of US 19 / SR 55 overlap; north end of SR 700 overlap; north end of CR 480 overlap
Citrus		409.881	659.640		CR 480 east (Oak Park Boulevard)	South end of CR 480 overlap
Hernando		413.8	665.9		SR 589 (Suncoast Parkway) – Tampa, Crystal River	
Hernando		417.575	672.022		CR 491 (Citrus Way) – Lecanto	
Hernando		419.738	675.503		CR 476 (Lake Lindsey Road) – Nobleton, Bushnell	
Hernando		421.255	677.944		US 98 Truck south / CR 485 south (Cobb Road) to I-75 – truck route to SR 50	
Hernando	Brooksville	425.366	684.560		SR 50A west (Jefferson Street west) / SR 700 south (Ponce de Leon Boulevard south) to SR 589 (Suncoast Parkway) / US 41 south / I-75 / SR 50 – Weeki Wachee	South end of SR 700 overlap; west end of SR 50A overlap
Hernando	Brooksville	425.574– 425.646	684.895– 685.011		US 41 south (SR 45) – Masaryktown, Land o' Lakes	West end of US 41 / SR 45 overlap
Hernando	Brooksville	426.428	686.269		US 41 (SR 45)	East end of US 41 / SR 45 overlap
Hernando	Brooksville–South Brooksville line	427.326	687.715		CR 581 (Emerson Road)	
Hernando	South Brooksville	427.841	688.543		US 98 Truck north / SR 50 west (Cortez Boulevard) / SR 50A ends – Weeki Wachee, Spring Hill	East end of SR 50A overlap; eastern terminus of SR 50A; north end of SR 50 overlap
Hernando	Hill 'n Dale	432.036	695.295		CR 484 west (Mondon Hill Road) / CR 541 south (Spring Lake Highway) – Spring Lake, Dade City	
Hernando		436.06	701.77		I-75 (SR 93) – Tampa, St. Petersburg, Ocala	I-75 exit 301
Hernando	Ridge Manor	439.062	706.602		SR 50 east (Cortez Boulevard) – Groveland, Orlando	South end of SR 50 overlap
Pasco		442.168	711.600		CR 575 (Trilby Road) – Lacoochee, Trilby	
Pasco		442.917	712.806		US 301 north (SR 35) – Wildwood	North end of US 301 / SR 35 overlap
Pasco	see US 301 (mile 92.506-83.074)					
Pasco		452.349	727.985		US 301 south (SR 39) – Zephyrhills	South end of US 301 overlap
Pasco		455.406	732.905		CR 35 Alt. (Old Lakeland Highway) – Richland	Interchange
Pasco–Polk county line		460.532	741.154		CR 54 west – Zephyrhills	
Polk		461.974	743.475		SR 471 north – Tarrytown, Webster, Colt Creek State Park	
Polk		469.621	755.782		CR 35A south (Socrum Loop Road) – Kathleen	
Polk	Lakeland	475.17	764.71		I-4 (SR 400) – Tampa, Orlando	I-4 exit 32
Polk	Lakeland	477.537	768.521		US 92 (Memorial Boulevard / SR 546 / SR 700 south)	South end of SR 700 overlap
Polk	Lakeland	477.900	769.105		SR 548 west (George Jenkins Boulevard) to SR 37 / Florida Avenue (SR 35 south)	South end of SR 35 overlap; north end of SR 548 overlap
Polk	Lakeland	478.720	770.425		Main Street (SR 35 north / SR 600) - Downtown Lakeland, Amtrak	south end of SR 548 overlap; north end of SR 35 overlap
Polk	Lakeland	479.255	771.286		Lake Parker Avenue (SR 700 north)	North end of SR 700 overlap; no left turn southbound
Polk	Eaton Park	482.149	775.944		SR 659 north (Combee Road)	
Polk		482.80	776.99		SR 570 (Polk Parkway) – Tampa, Orlando	SR 570 exit 10
Polk		483.113	777.495		SR 540 east (Winter Lake Road)	
Polk	Highland City	485.453	781.261		CR 540 west (Clubhouse Road)	
Polk		486.628	783.152		CR 540A west	
Polk	Bartow	488.822	786.683		To US 17 / Ernest M. Smith Boulevard	North bypass of Bartow
Polk	Bartow	490.421	789.256		SR 60 west / Broadway Avenue (SR 35 south) – Mulberry, Tampa, Downtown Bartow	South end of SR 35 overlap; north end of SR 60 overlap
Polk	Bartow	490.948	790.104		SR 60 east – Lake Wales, Vero Beach	South end of SR 60 overlap
Polk	Bartow	491.216	790.536		US 17 north (SR 555) – Eagle Lake, Winter Haven	North end of US 17 / SR 555 overlap
Polk	Bartow	491.724	791.353		To Main Street (SR 35 north) east / SR 60 – Lake Wales, Mulberry, Historic District	south end of SR 555 overlap; north end of SR 35 overlap; former SR 60 Business
Polk	Homeland	497.013	799.865		CR 640 – Homeland, Homeland Heritage Park, Mosaic Peace River Park	
Polk	Fort Meade	502.067	807.999		US 17 south (Charleston Avenue / SR 35) / CR 630 west (Broadway) – Wauchula	South end of US 17 / SR 35 overlap
Polk		517.131	832.242		US 27 north (SR 25) / CR 630 east – Lake Wales, Frostproof, Indian Lake Estates	North end of US 27 / SR 25 overlap
see US 27 (mile 182.234-157.342)
Highlands		542.023	872.301		US 27 south (SR 25) / SR 66 west – Lake Placid, Zolfo Springs	South end of US 27 / SR 25 overlap
Highlands		542.363	872.849		CR 17 north – DeSoto City	West end of CR 17 overlap
Highlands		542.976	873.835		CR 17 south	East end of CR 17 overlap
Highlands		555.879	894.601		CR 621 south	
Highlands	Fort Basinger	566.243	911.280		CR 721 south	
Okeechobee	Basinger	569.945	917.238		CR 700B south (NW 178th Avenue)	
Okeechobee	Basinger	570.069	917.437		CR 700A north (NW 176th Avenue) – Kissimmee Prairie Preserve State Park	
Okeechobee	Basinger	571.816	920.249		CR 68 east (NW 160th Street)	
Okeechobee		584.271	940.293		SR 70 west – Arcadia	North end of SR 70 overlap
Okeechobee	Okeechobee	585.442	942.178		US 441 north (Parrott Avenue / SR 15) / SR 70 east (Park Street) to SR 710 / Florida's Turnpike – Orlando, Amtrak, Ft. Pierce	South end of SR 70 overlap; north end of US 441 / SR 15 overlap
see US 441 (mile 138.841-93.270), SR 80 (mile 83.534-123.480); Cardinal direction change from north-south to east-west at Okeechobee-Martin County line
Palm Beach	Palm Beach	670.959	1,079.804		SR A1A (Ocean Boulevard)	Roundabout; east end of SR 80 overlap
1.000 mi = 1.609 km; 1.000 km = 0.621 mi: Concurrency terminus; Incomplete access; Tolled

== See also ==
- Special routes of U.S. Route 98, most of which are in Florida.

U.S. Route 98
Previous state: Alabama	Florida	Next state: Terminus
