= Florida State Road 370 =

State highway in Florida

State Road 370
- Gulf Coast Parkway

Route information
- Maintained by FDOT
- Length: 1.7 mi (2.7 km)
- Existed: 2022–present

Major junctions
- West end: US 98 – Callaway
- East end: CR 2315 in Callaway

Location
- Country: United States
- State: Florida
- Counties: Bay

Highway system
- Florida State Highway System; Interstate; US; State; Former; Pre‑1945; Toll; Scenic
| ← SR 369 | → SR 371 |

State Road 370 (SR 370), locally known as the Gulf Coast Parkway, is a short state highway in Bay County, Florida, United States. Serving an unincorporated section of the county, the two-lane roadway runs for approximately two miles (3.2 km) between U.S. Highway 98 (US 98, Tyndall Parkway) and County Road 2315 (CR 2315, Star Avenue), providing an alternate route to the unpaved Tram Road it parallels. The route was built by the Florida Department of Transportation (FDOT) as the first constructed segment of a long-planned regional connector, also called the Gulf Coast Parkway, that has been studied since the mid-2010s as a way to eventually link US 98 in Gulf County with US 231 in Bay County.

== Route description ==
SR 370 begins at an intersection with US 98 (Tyndall Parkway) in unincorporated Bay County and runs east to an intersection with CR 2315 (Star Avenue), roughly paralleling the older, unpaved Tram Road. The entire route is a two-lane undivided highway with a separated multi-use path running alongside it for its full length, and it is signalized at both endpoints. The corridor passes through a largely wooded, undeveloped area of unincorporated Bay County, north of Callaway, and provides direct access to the Clifford Chester Sims State Veterans Nursing Home. The entire route is in Bay County.

== History ==
=== Former route ===
SR 370 was previously used for a highway in Franklin County from US 98 to Alligator Point. It was handed over to the county as part of CR 370 in 1977 when the secondary state route network was decommissioned, but was still referred to as SR 370 for years afterwards.

=== Current route ===
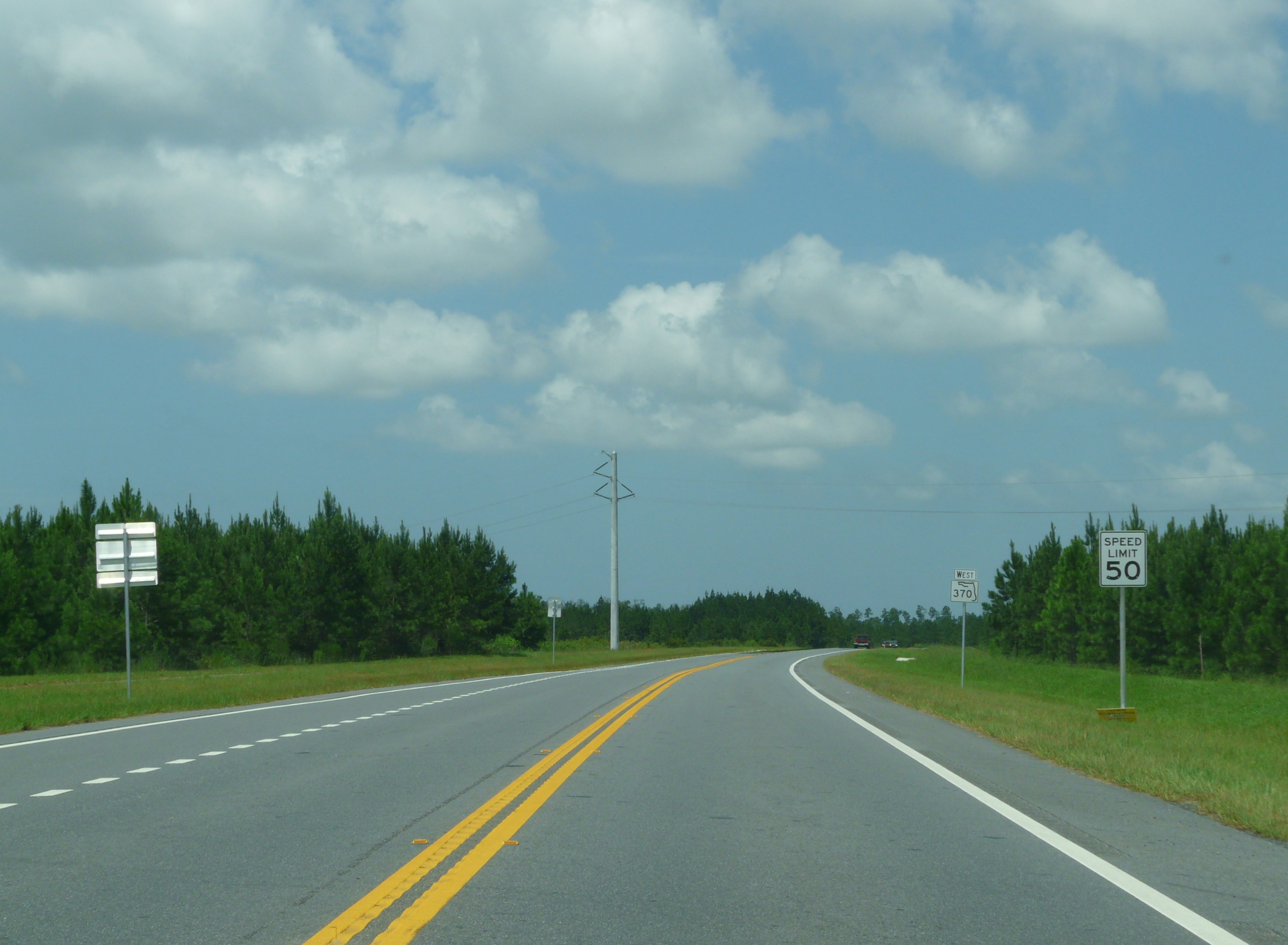
Westbound from the eastern terminus

FDOT began studying a regional Gulf Coast Parkway corridor in the mid-2010s as a way to relieve traffic on US 98 and SR 22 in Callaway, to reduce reliance on Tram Road as an unpaved cut-through and to create an additional hurricane evacuation route for southeastern Bay County and Gulf County, an area FDOT considered inadequately served given that US 98 lies within the storm surge zone for a major hurricane along much of that corridor. Of the roughly 36-mile (58 km) regional corridor initially studied, intended to link US 98 with US 221, only a roughly two-mile (3.2 km) segment connecting Tyndall Parkway (US 98) and Star Avenue (CR 2315) advanced to design and funding.

Construction on this segment, designated SR 370, began in November 2022 at a cost of about $16 million, funded entirely by FDOT. The project was built adjacent to Tram Road and included two-lane paving, traffic signals at both the Tyndall Parkway and Star Avenue intersections, and a 10-foot-wide (3.0 m) multi-use path for pedestrians and bicyclists. It also added a connection providing direct access to the Clifford Chester Sims State Veterans Nursing Home. FDOT officials said additional segments of the broader Gulf Coast Parkway corridor could be considered in the future depending on demand. As of October 2025, the roughly two-mile (3.2 km) Tyndall Parkway–to–Star Avenue segment was nearing completion, and opened to traffic in late 2025.

== Major intersections ==
The entire route is in Bay County.

| Location | mi | km | Destinations | Notes |
|---|---|---|---|---|
| | 0.0 | 0.0 | US 98 (Tyndall Parkway) | Western terminus |
| | 1.7 | 2.7 | CR 2315 (Star Avenue) | Eastern terminus |
1.000 mi = 1.609 km; 1.000 km = 0.621 mi
