= Florida State Road 196 =

State highway in Florida, United States

State Road 196
- Florida State Road 196 highlighted in red

Route information
- Maintained by FDOT
- Length: 1.009 mi (1.624 km)

Major junctions
- West end: Tarragona Street in Pensacola
- East end: US 98 in Pensacola

Location
- Country: United States
- State: Florida
- Counties: Escambia

Highway system
- Florida State Highway System; Interstate; US; State; Former; Pre‑1945; Toll; Scenic
← I-195	→ SR 200

State Road 196 (SR 196) is a short east–west thoroughfare in downtown Pensacola, Florida. It runs from Tarragona Street east to U.S. Highway 98 (Chase Street). The portion of the road from Tarragona Street east to Alcaniz Street is known as East Main Street, and consists of two through lanes with a center left-turn lane. East of Alcaniz Street, the road is a four-lane divided boulevard known as Bayfront Parkway. In combination with U.S. Highway 98, SR 196 connects the south end of downtown to the Pensacola Bay Bridge.

== Major intersections ==
The entire route is in Pensacola, Escambia County.

mi	km	Destinations	Notes
0.000	0.000	Tarragona Street	
1.009	1.624	US 98 east (Bayfront Parkway / SR 30)	
1.000 mi = 1.609 km; 1.000 km = 0.621 mi
