= List of county roads in Franklin County, Florida =

- County road shields used in Florida

Highway names
- Interstates: Interstate X (I-X)
- US Highways: U.S. Highway X (US X)
- State: State Road X (SR X)
- County: County Road X (CR-X)

System links
- County roads in Florida; County roads in Franklin County

The following is a list of county roads in Franklin County, Florida. All county roads are maintained by the county in which they reside, although not all routes are marked with standard county road shields.

== County roads in Franklin County ==
| Route | Road Name(s) | From | To | Notes |
|---|---|---|---|---|
| CR 30A | Marine Street, Avenue F, Gulf Avenue | CR 30 at the Gulf County line west-southwest of Apalachicola US 98 / US 319 / CR 67 in Carrabelle | US 98 (SR 30) west of Apalachicola US 98 / US 319 east of Carrabelle | Former SR 30A; inventoried by FDOT as CR 30A but signed as CR 30 |
| CR 65 | Patton Drive Bay Shore Drive | SR 300 in Eastpoint U.S. 98 (SR 30) in Eastpoint | Rose Drive north of Eastpoint SR 300 in Eastpoint | Former SR 65 |
| CR 67 | Tallahassee Street | US 98 / US 319 / CR 30A in Carrabelle | Franklin-Liberty County Line | former SR 67 |
| CR 67A | Ryan Drive, 11th Street, Three Rivers Road | US 98 / US 319 (SR 30) in Carrabelle | CR 67 / NE Avenue K in Carrabelle | Former SR 67A. Not on 2019 map. |
| CR 300 | East Gulf Beach Drive | SR 300 on St. George Island | St. George Island | Former SR 300 |
| CR 370 | Alligator Drive Rio Vista Drive | Dead end in Alligator Point US 319 (SR 377) south of Sopchoppy | US 98 (SR 30) northwest of Southern Dunes Dead end southeast of Sopchoppy | Former SR 370. Formerly included a segment along Bald Point Road. Former SR 310 |
| CR 376 | Timber Island Road | US 98 / US 319 (SR 30) / Pine Street in Carrabelle | Timber Island Boat Ramp in Carrabelle | Former SR 376. Formerly extended north along Airport Road. |
| CR 379 | River Road | US 98 / US 319 (SR 30) in Carrabelle | Entrance to The Retreat at Three Rivers west of Carrabelle | Former SR 379 |
| CR 379A | Mill Road | CR 379 west of Carrabelle | Mill Road west of Carrabelle | Former SR 379A |
| CR 384 | 12th Street, Bluff Road | US 98 (SR 30) / 12th Street in Apalachicola | Pine Log Road in Old Woman's Bluff | Former SR 384 |
| CR 384A | Waddell Road | CR 384 in Franklin | Dead end north-northeast of Franklin | Former SR 384A. Not on 2019 map. |
| CR 385 | Tilton Road | US 98 (SR 30) south of Tilton | Crossing over the AN Railway in Tilton | Former SR 385 |
