= Indian Lake State Forest =

State forest in Florida

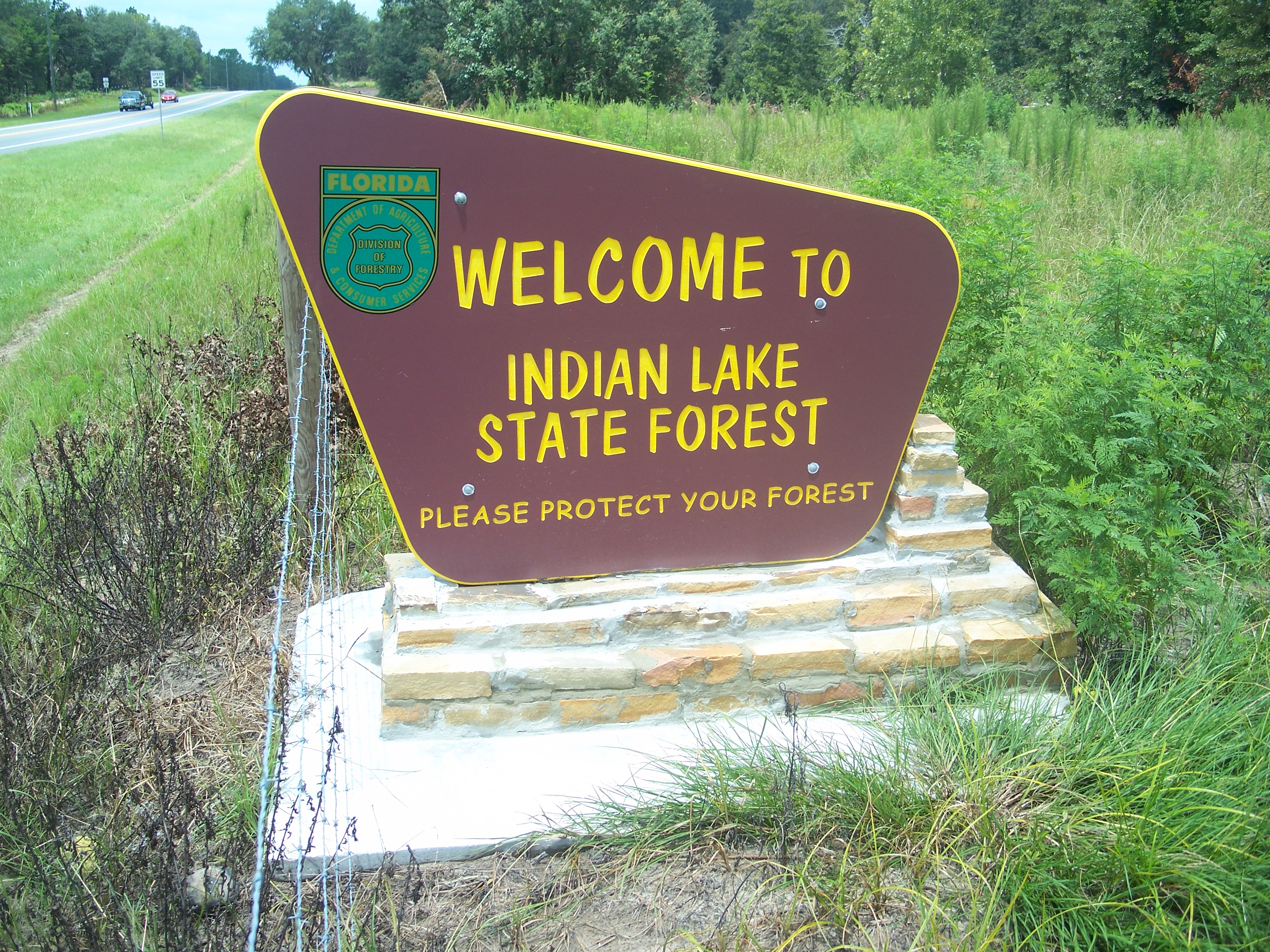
- Indian Lake State Forest signage

- Location within Florida
- Nearest city: Silver Springs, Florida
- Coordinates: 29°15′35″N 82°03′55″W
- Area: 4,462 acres (1,806 ha)
- Other information: Hiking, bird watching and horseback riding
- Website: Indian Lake State Forest

The Indian Lake State Forest is approximately 4,466 acres of gently rolling sandhills and pastures just north of historic Silver Springs in Marion County, Florida. This property was acquired in 2007 and 2008 under the Florida Forever program, with additional money from Marion County and help from The Nature Conservancy, Silver Springs Working Group, and the Department of Environmental Protection.

== Natural Features ==
In addition to sandhills dotted with sinkholes, natural community types found on the forest include depression marshes and mesic flatwoods. Driving down State Road 326 you can see a mix of longleaf pines, sand post oaks and turkey oaks in some of the nicer sandhills on this land. A mix of wildflower color and wiregrass is also visible here, especially the fall after a prescribed fire. A visitor might see gopher tortoises, fox squirrels, kestrels or turkeys. Another feature is Indian Lake, the deep sinkhole lake that is located east of Baseline Road and drains Indian Lake Prairie into the Floridan aquifer.

Scientific studies traced out the areas of water recharge that feed Silver Springs. These areas include the land now known as Indian Lake State Forest. As a result of the studies, Indian Lake State Forest was purchased under the Florida Forever springs initiative. Rolling sandhills on a sinkhole-rich karst topography dominate the property, although most of the sandhills have been converted to till agriculture or improved pasture.

The land uses prior to acquisition have allowed exotic plant invasion, and exotic plants have replaced or displaced historic vegetation in many areas. One of the main goals of the Florida Forever purchase was to restore these altered areas and eliminate any adverse impacts these alterations might have had on the Silver Springs system for water flow and water quality. Planting longleaf pine seedlings is an important step to meet this goal. When you drive down Baseline Road, you can see some of the recently planted longleaf pine seedlings starting to pop out of the grass stage and grow into a young forest.

Since the acquisition of Indian Lake State Forest, the Florida Forest Service has built trailheads, posted boundaries, installed gates, controlled exotic plants, planted longleaf pine seedlings, and implemented a prescribed burning program. State forest managers use prescribed burning to mimic the natural occurrence of fire. Periodic fire is necessary to maintain the forest's unique plant and animal diversity.

== Recreation ==
Recreational opportunities in the forest include hiking, bird-watching and horseback riding. The main trailhead and parking area for the Bear-N-Oak hiking trail are located 2.1 miles (3.4 km) north of the stoplight at the intersection of State Road 326 and County Road 35 (also known as Baseline Road) on the east side of County Road 35.

There are 11 miles of designated horse trails. The Indian Lake Equestrian Trailhead is located 1.5 miles (2.4 km) north of the stoplight at the intersection of State Road 326 and County Road 35 (Baseline Road).

== See also ==
- List of Florida state forests
- Ocala Street and Suburban Railroad
