= Florida State Road 548 =

State highway in Florida, United States

State Road 548
- George Jenkins Boulevard

Route information
- Maintained by FDOT
- Length: 1.809 mi (2.911 km)
- Existed: 2004–present

Major junctions
- West end: SR 600 in Lakeland
- East end: US 98 in Lakeland

Location
- Country: United States
- State: Florida
- Counties: Polk

Highway system
- Florida State Highway System; Interstate; US; State; Former; Pre‑1945; Toll; Scenic
← SR 547	→ SR 549

State Road 548 (SR 548), also known as the Lakeland In-Town Bypass, is a short six-lane arterial in Lakeland, Florida, United States, opened in early 2004. It connects George Jenkins Boulevard (west of downtown) to U.S. Highway 98 (US 98) and SR 600 (Bartow Road and Main Street) east of downtown, allowing traffic to bypass downtown.

== History ==
SR 548 began construction in 2002 and opened in 2004. In 2005 it was stalled by budget cuts only for construction to resume in 2006, with a scaled back design that excluded the originally proposed bridge over SR 539 (Kathleen Road) east of the bridge over Lakeland Junction.

=== Second phase ===
SR 548 was extended west across SR 563 (Martin Luther King Jr. Avenue) and SR 539 (Kathleen Road) terminating at George Jenkins Boulevard west of downtown. This provides a full east–west bypass to supplement US 92 (Memorial Boulevard) and SR 400 (Interstate 4).

== Major intersections ==
The entire route is in Lakeland, Polk County.

mi	km	Destinations	Notes
0.000	0.000	Sloan Avenue / George Jenkins Boulevard (SR 600)	Former US 92 BUS
0.549	0.884	SR 539 (Kathleen Road)	
0.749	1.205	SR 563 (Martin L. King Jr. Avenue)	
0.989	1.592	US 98 north (Florida Avenue / SR 35)	West end of US 98 overlap
1.184	1.905	Massachusetts Avenue	Former SR 33
1.809	2.911	US 98 south (Bartow Road / SR 35 south) / Main Street (SR 35 north / SR 600)	East end of US 98 overlap
1.000 mi = 1.609 km; 1.000 km = 0.621 mi: Concurrency terminus
