= St. George Island Bridge =

Highway in Florida

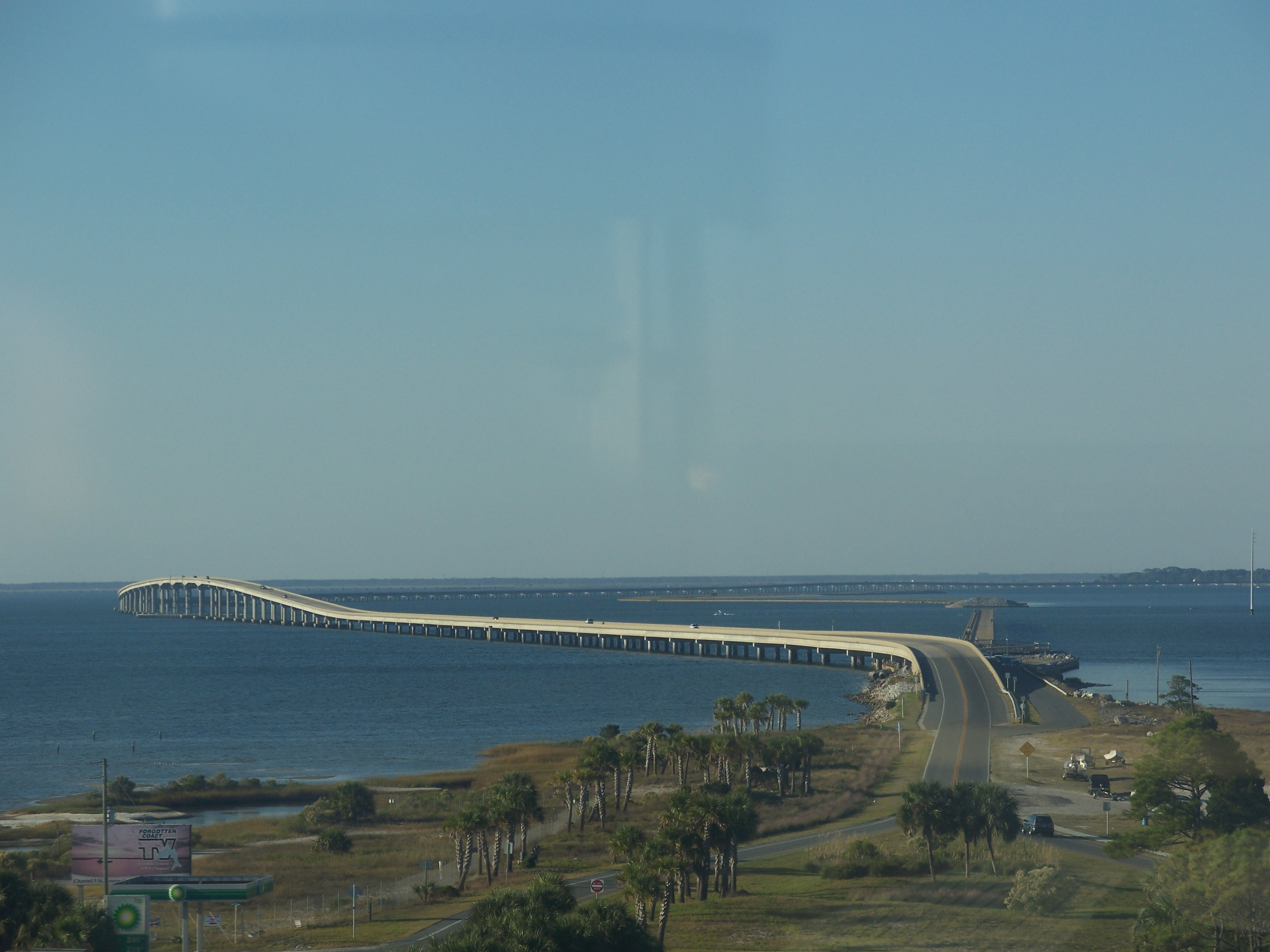
- Coordinates: 29.683751°N 84.880468°W
- Carries: SR 300
- Locale: Apalachicola to St. George Island, Franklin County, Florida
- Official name: Bryant Patton Memorial Bridge
- Maintained by: Florida Department of Transportation

Characteristics
- Total length: 21,542 feet (6,566 m)
- Clearance below: 65 feet (20 m)

History
- Opened: February 27, 2004

Location
- Interactive map of St. George Island Bridge

The 4-mile (6.4 km) St. George Island Bridge (officially named the Bryant Patton Memorial Bridge and designated State Road 300 from end to end, plus approaches) was built in 2002 (completed in 2004) when the two original bridges (cut by an island in the middle) that led to St. George Island, a small resort community 10 miles (16 km) from Apalachicola, Florida, were deemed unsafe due to their old age. The original bridges opened in 1965; prior to that, visitors used a ferry to get to the island. The new bridge, by bypassing the middle island, became the 3rd-longest bridge in Florida. The north end of SR 300 is at US 98 / US 319 (SR 30) in Eastpoint. It was opened on February 27, 2004.

SR G1A, the former designation for the bridge.

Initially, the bridge was designated State Road G1A by the Florida Department of Transportation while Gulf Beach Drive on the island east of the bridge was given the SR 300 designation. Later, the bridge and Gulf Beach Drive were both SR 300. More recently, Gulf Beach Drive lost its State Road designation, leaving only the St. George Island Bridge with the SR 300 designation. The eastern half of Gulf Beach Drive is now County Road 300.

"State Road G1A" was an analogue on the Gulf of Mexico to SR A1A on the Atlantic Ocean. It is one of two x00 routes to not follow the numbering system - the other is SR 800, a short connection over the Intracoastal Waterway in Boca Raton. All other x00 routes are major cross-state diagonals.

== Major intersections ==
The entire route is in Franklin County.

Location	mi	km	Destinations	Notes
St. George Island	0.000	0.000	CR 300 east (Gulf Beach Drive) – St. George Island State Park	
	0.582– 4.662	0.937– 7.503	St. George Island Bridge over St. George Sound (Gulf Intracoastal Waterway)	
Eastpoint	5.579	8.979	US 98 / US 319 (SR 30)	
1.000 mi = 1.609 km; 1.000 km = 0.621 mi

== See also ==
- State Road A19A

Browse numbered routes
← SR A1A	G1A	→ SR 2
← SR 298	FL 300	→ US 301
