= Pensacola Bay Bridge =

Bridge in Florida, United States of America

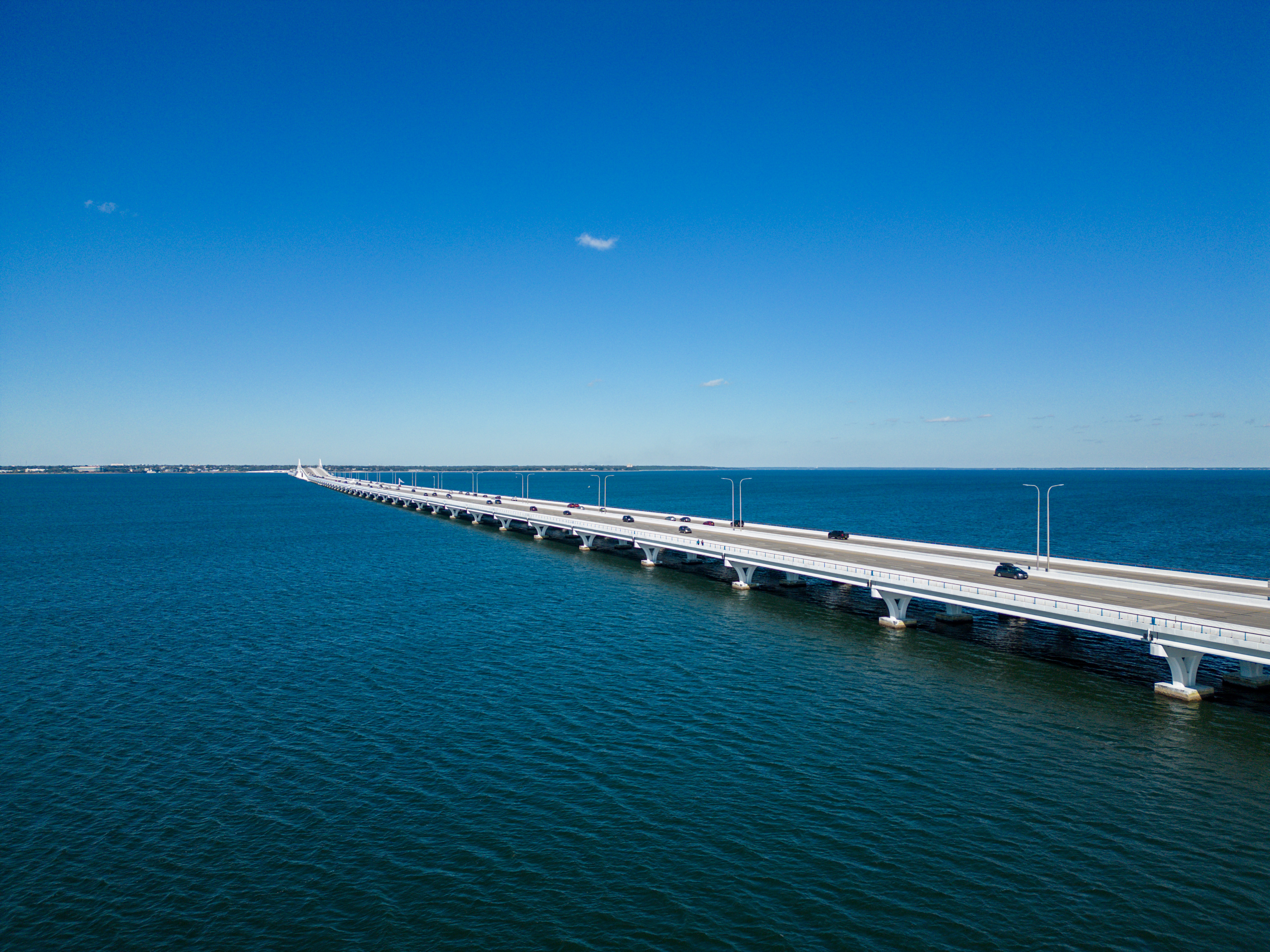
- The current bridge, looking northeast
- Coordinates: 30.395983°N 87.185644°W
- Carries: 6 lanes of US 98 / SR 30
- Crosses: Pensacola Bay
- Locale: Pensacola, Florida, and Gulf Breeze, Florida, U.S.
- Official name: Philip Dane Beall Sr., Memorial Bridge (Previous Bridge); Gen. Daniel "Chappie" James Jr. Bridge (Both Eastbound and Westbound bridges of new project)
- Maintained by: Florida Department of Transportation (FDOT)
- ID number: 480035
- Website: pensacolabaybridge.com

Characteristics
- Design: Reinforced concrete girder bridge
- Total length: 16,140 feet (4,920 meters)
- Width: 55 feet (17 meters)
- Longest span: 377 feet (115 meters)
- Clearance below: 65 feet (20 meters)

History
- Opened: June 13, 1931 (original bridge); October 31, 1960 (second bridge); September 5, 2019 (current bridge, eastbound span); February 14, 2023 (current bridge, westbound span)

Statistics
- Daily traffic: 50,580

Location
- Interactive map of Pensacola Bay Bridge

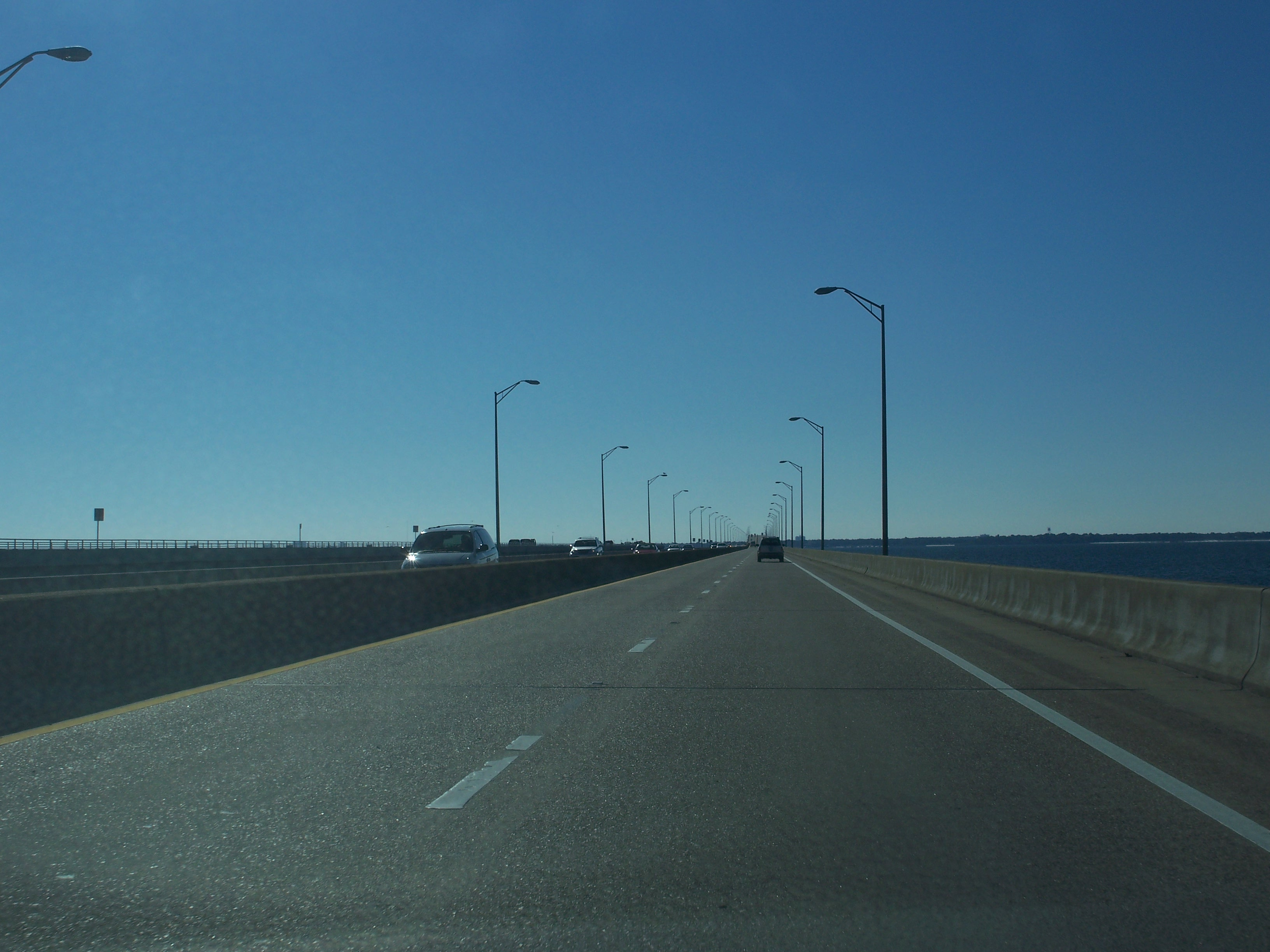
On the Old Bridge, Heading South

The Pensacola Bay Bridge, also known locally as the Three-Mile Bridge, runs between downtown Pensacola, Florida, and Gulf Breeze, Florida. It carries six lanes of U.S. Highway 98 across Pensacola Bay.

== History ==
The bridge, which is dedicated to General Daniel James Jr., opened to traffic on September 5, 2019, at which time it replaced the Sen. Philip D. Beall Sr. Bridge, a four-lane facility that ran parallel just to the east of the current structure, and on the same footprint of the eventual westbound structure. The original bridge, a narrow two-lane facility, called the Thomas A. Johnson Bridge, was replaced by the Sen. Philip D. Beall Sr. Bridge on October 31, 1960. The original bridge, which had been in service since June 13, 1931, was tolled and was signed as TOLL US 98 until the bridge bonds were paid off. The decommissioned original bridge served as two 1.5-mile-long fishing piers until they were largely destroyed by Hurricane Ivan in 2004. By 2007, the remainder of the northernmost fishing pier was demolished. Demolition has begun on the southernmost part of the fishing pier. In 2010, construction was completed on a northern replacement fishing pier about half as long as the original pier. As of June 1, 2021, however, the northern replacement fishing pier is out of service, sustaining major damage as a result of rogue barges from Hurricane Sally, with damages to the fishing pier alone estimated to be US$28 million.

In 1989, the bridge was struck by a barge and was out of service for several months. All traffic was diverted to ferries, causing severe backups in both Gulf Breeze and downtown Pensacola. The Florida Department of Transportation took the opportunity to modernize the bridge, adding emergency lanes and replacing barrier walls and lighting.

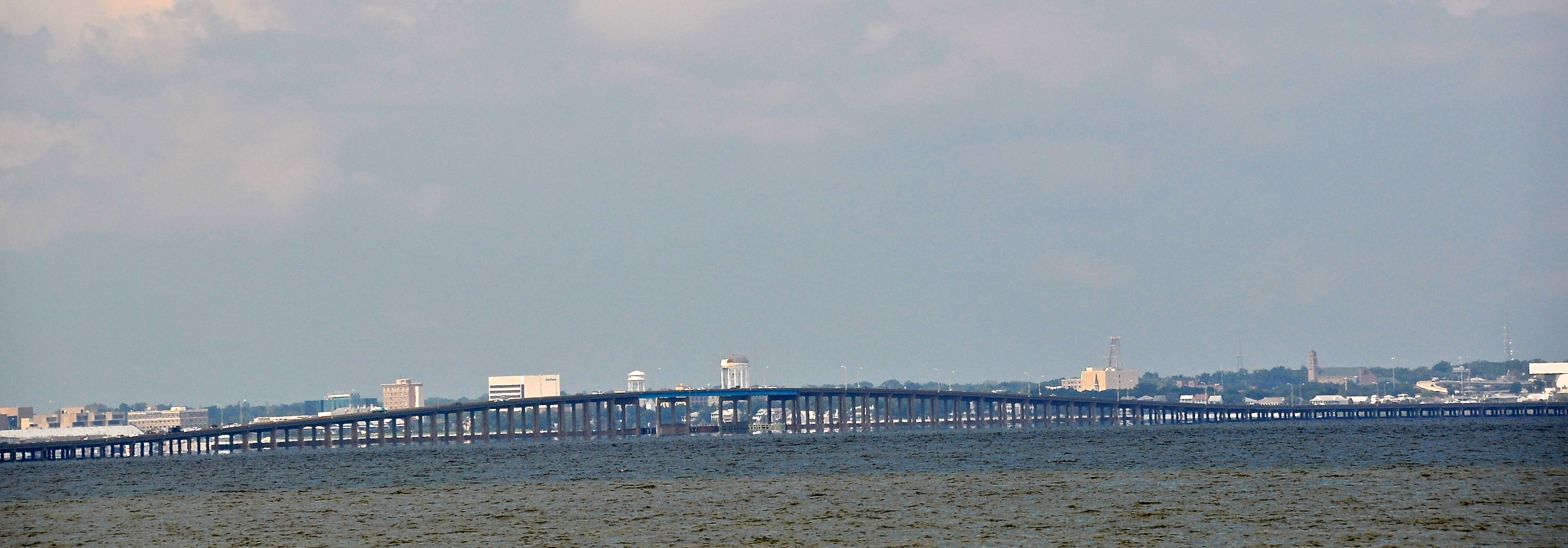
The Old Pensacola Bay Bridge as viewed from Naval Live Oaks Preserve.

FDOT announced in January 2010, near the end of the bridge's 50-year design life, that the bridge was structurally deficient and would have to be replaced within six years. As of 2011, a study is underway to determine the "feasibility, location, and conceptual design" of a replacement bridge. As of February 2013, plans have begun to replace the bridge with construction beginning within two years, at a cost of $595.6 million, on a course slightly to the west of the existing bridge. The new bridge, like the previous one, will not charge a toll. As of February 2020, construction of the new westbound bridge was completed with only the pedestrian portion to be completed with the old bridge being dismantled to make way for the parallel bridge to begin construction.

The first unofficial crossing of the bridge via the pedestrian walkway occurred on August 13, 2020. This was accomplished by Joe and Steve Evans, brothers from the Midwest. It took approximately 15 minutes of biking each way to fully cover the distance.

However, the bridge was involved in two separate incidents during Hurricane Sally in the 2020 Atlantic hurricane season. On September 15, a barge broke loose and got stuck under the bridge, causing it to temporarily close. Later, during the early morning hours of September 16, a crane was blown down onto the bridge, knocking almost the entire span into Pensacola Bay, rendering the bridge completely unusable. With the old bridge being closed in preparation for demolition, traffic was detoured onto the tolled Garcon Point Bridge, with tolls being suspended for the time being. After months of delays, the first span of the bridge reopened on May 28, 2021, carrying 2-4 lanes of traffic with full 4 lane use in the following months as construction is completed. The new westbound bridge was opened in early 2023. The bridge again closed during Hurricane Isaias in 2026 as a precaution.
