= Kathleen, Florida =

- Census-designated place
- Location in Polk County and the state of Florida
- Coordinates: 28°07′40″N 82°02′26″W
- Country: United States
- State: Florida
- County: Polk

Area
  - Total: 7.23 sq mi (18.73 km^{2})
  - Land: 7.19 sq mi (18.63 km^{2})
  - Water: 0.039 sq mi (0.10 km^{2})
- Elevation: 118 ft (36 m)

Population (2020)
  - Total: 6,486
  - Density: 901.8/sq mi (348.18/km^{2})
- Time zone: UTC-5 (Eastern (EST))
  - Summer (DST): UTC-4 (EDT)
- ZIP code: 33849
- Area code: 863
- FIPS code: 12-35950
- GNIS feature ID: 2403164

Kathleen is a census-designated place (CDP) in Polk County, Florida, United States. As of the 2020 census, Kathleen had a population of 6,486. It is part of the Lakeland–Winter Haven Metropolitan Statistical Area.

== History ==
A post office called Kathleen has been in operation since 1886. The community was named for Catherine Prine, an early settler.

== Geography ==
According to the United States Census Bureau, the CDP has a total area of 3.3 square miles (8.5 km^{2}), all land.

== Demographics ==
Historical population
Census	Pop.	Note	%±
2020	6,486		—
U.S. Decennial Census

=== 2020 census ===
As of the 2020 census, Kathleen had a population of 6,486. The median age was 38.2 years. 24.7% of residents were under the age of 18 and 14.2% of residents were 65 years of age or older. For every 100 females there were 101.9 males, and for every 100 females age 18 and over there were 98.7 males age 18 and over.

97.1% of residents lived in urban areas, while 2.9% lived in rural areas.

There were 2,177 households in Kathleen, of which 33.3% had children under the age of 18 living in them. Of all households, 50.1% were married-couple households, 16.7% were households with a male householder and no spouse or partner present, and 23.9% were households with a female householder and no spouse or partner present. About 18.8% of all households were made up of individuals and 7.9% had someone living alone who was 65 years of age or older.

There were 2,373 housing units, of which 8.3% were vacant. The homeowner vacancy rate was 2.7% and the rental vacancy rate was 5.2%.

Racial composition as of the 2020 census
Race	Number	Percent
White	5,093	78.5%
Black or African American	206	3.2%
American Indian and Alaska Native	78	1.2%
Asian	48	0.7%
Native Hawaiian and Other Pacific Islander	16	0.2%
Some other race	436	6.7%
Two or more races	609	9.4%
Hispanic or Latino (of any race)	1,257	19.4%

=== 2000 census ===
As of the census of 2000, there were 3,280 people, 1,162 households, and 900 families residing in the CDP. The population density was 986.4 inhabitants per square mile (380.9/km^{2}). There were 1,250 housing units at an average density of 375.9 per square mile (145.1/km^{2}). The racial makeup of the CDP was 93.87% White, 1.71% African American, 0.43% Native American, 0.21% Asian, 0.12% Pacific Islander, 2.56% from other races, and 1.10% from two or more races. Hispanic or Latino of any race were 7.56% of the population.

There were 1,162 households, out of which 37.8% had children under the age of 18 living with them, 61.5% were married couples living together, 11.3% had a female householder with no husband present, and 22.5% were non-families. 17.7% of all households were made up of individuals, and 6.1% had someone living alone who was 65 years of age or older. The average household size was 2.82 and the average family size was 3.19.

In the CDP, the population was spread out, with 28.3% under the age of 18, 8.1% from 18 to 24, 30.0% from 25 to 44, 23.8% from 45 to 64, and 9.8% who were 65 years of age or older. The median age was 36 years. For every 100 females, there were 98.5 males. For every 100 females age 18 and over, there were 96.2 males.

The median income for a household in the CDP was $39,226, and the median income for a family was $40,925. Males had a median income of $33,442 versus $21,066 for females. The per capita income for the CDP was $17,231. About 8.9% of families and 10.1% of the population were below the poverty line, including 10.8% of those under age 18 and 13.1% of those age 65 or over.
