= World Woods Golf Club =

Coordinates: 28.688°N 82.481°W

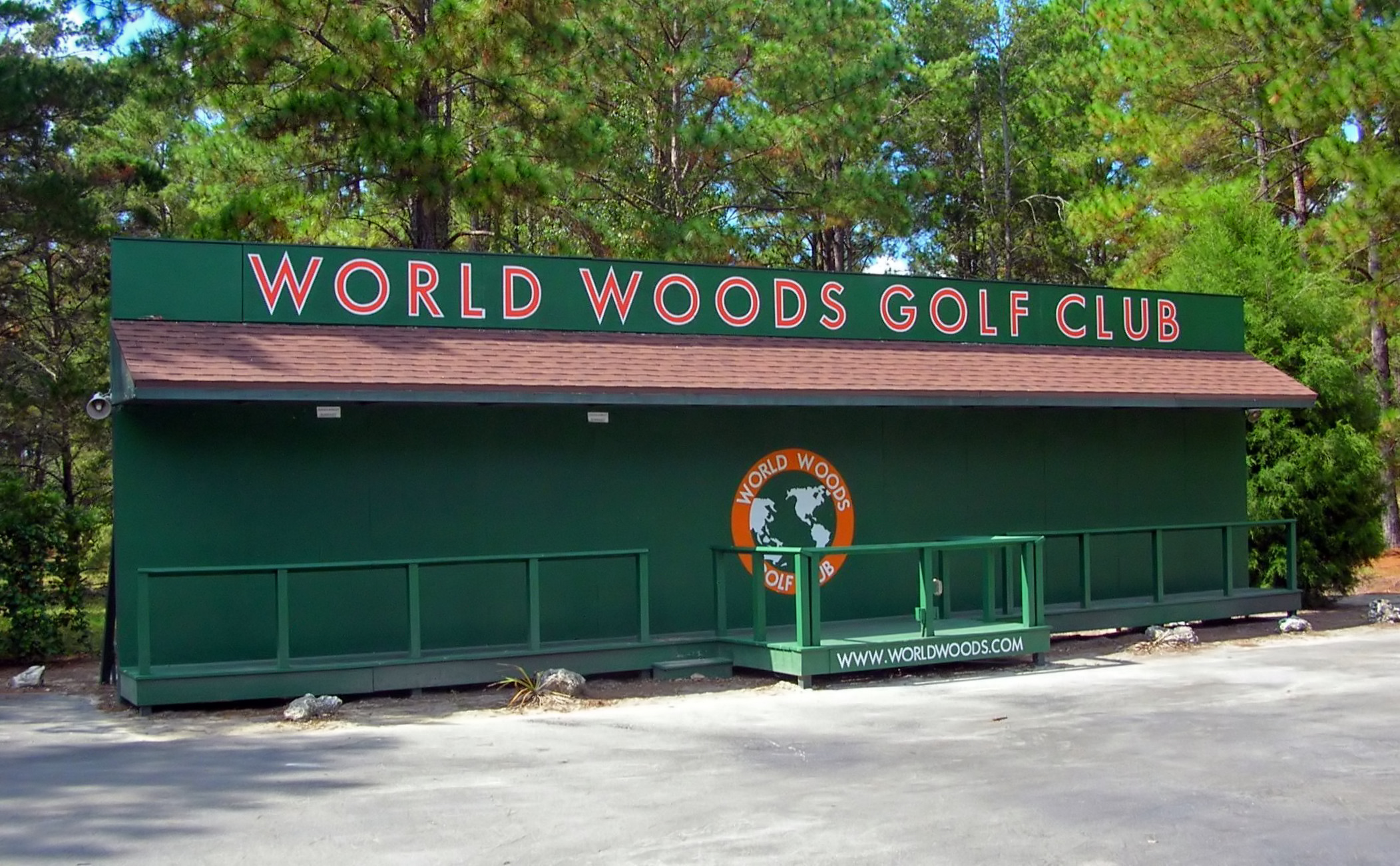
World Woods Golf Club

World Woods Golf Club was a golf facility located in Brooksville, Florida, with two Tom Fazio designed championship courses. World Woods was acquired by Cabot in 2022, and now operates as Cabot Citrus Farms, a world class golf-resort and real-estate development

World Woods Golf Club opened for play in 1991 and the two golf courses, Pine Barrens and Rolling Oaks, are distinctively different from each other. The Pine Barrens features rolling terrain with wide open fairways surrounded by vast sand waste bunkers. Pine Barrens is reminiscent of Pine Valley Golf Club located in New Jersey. The Rolling Oaks course, adjacent to Pine Barrens, is dotted with mature oak trees and a more traditional layout.

World Woods also sports a 22-acre, four-sided driving range, a 2.2-acre putting course, a nine-hole "short" executive course, a three-hole practice course, a minimalist clubhouse and snack bar with no on-site accommodations.

World Woods was previously owned by Interfive Florida Corporation based in Nagoya, Japan. Interfive also owned two neighboring courses, Southern Woods Golf Club and Sugarmill Woods Golf Club, both located in Sugarmill Woods.

In December 2021, Cabot SMW OPCO LLC, headquartered in Toronto, Canada, purchased World Woods, Southern Woods and Sugarmill Woods Country Club. Cabot currently operates Cabot Links in Nova Scotia and Cabot St. Lucia. The new resort name is Cabot Citrus Farms.
