= Green Swamp =

Green Swamp may refer to:

- Green Swamp (Florida), a swamp in Florida
- Green Swamp Wilderness Preserve, a preserve on Florida's Green Swamp
- Green Swamp (North Carolina), a swamp in North Carolina
- Green Swamp, former name of the area of Inverell, New South Wales, Australia
- The Green Swamp, a 1916 silent film
