= Odontolytes denominatus =

Scientific classification
- Kingdom: Animalia
- Phylum: Arthropoda
- Clade: Pancrustacea
- Class: Insecta
- Order: Coleoptera
- Suborder: Polyphaga
- Infraorder: Scarabaeiformia
- Family: Scarabaeidae
- Genus: Odontolytes
- Species: O. denominatus

Binomial name
- Odontolytes denominatus (Chevrolat, 1864)

Synonyms
- Ataenius arator Harold, 1869; Ataenius benjaminbanderai Islas, 1955; Ataenius brevinotus Chapin, 1940; Ataenius euglyptus Bates, 1887; Ataenius sciurus Cartwright, 1974; Auperia denominata Chevrolat, 1864; Phalangochaeta grandis Petrovitz, 1973

Species of beetle

Odontolytes denominatus is a species of aphodiine dung beetle in the family Scarabaeidae. It is found in Belize, Bolivia, Brazil (Rondônia, Santa Catarina), Colombia, Cuba, Ecuador, French Guiana, Guatemala, Honduras, Mexico (Chiapas, Guerrero, Oaxaca, San Luis Potosí, Veracruz), Panama, Venezuela and the United States (Florida).

== Description ==
Adults reach a length of about 6.4–7 mm (0.25–0.28 in). The body is elongate and piceous. The head is punctate, with the punctures elongate near the frons. The clypeus is emarginate. The pronotum has double (fine and coarse) puncturation and the lateral margins are weakly explanate. The elytra are convex, with a sharp humeral denticle. The interstriae are convex and visibly punctate and the tenth interstria is flat with a row of minute granules.

== Life history ==
Specimens have been collected in fox squirrel nests and Sciurus niger nests, and sometimes in horned owl nests.
