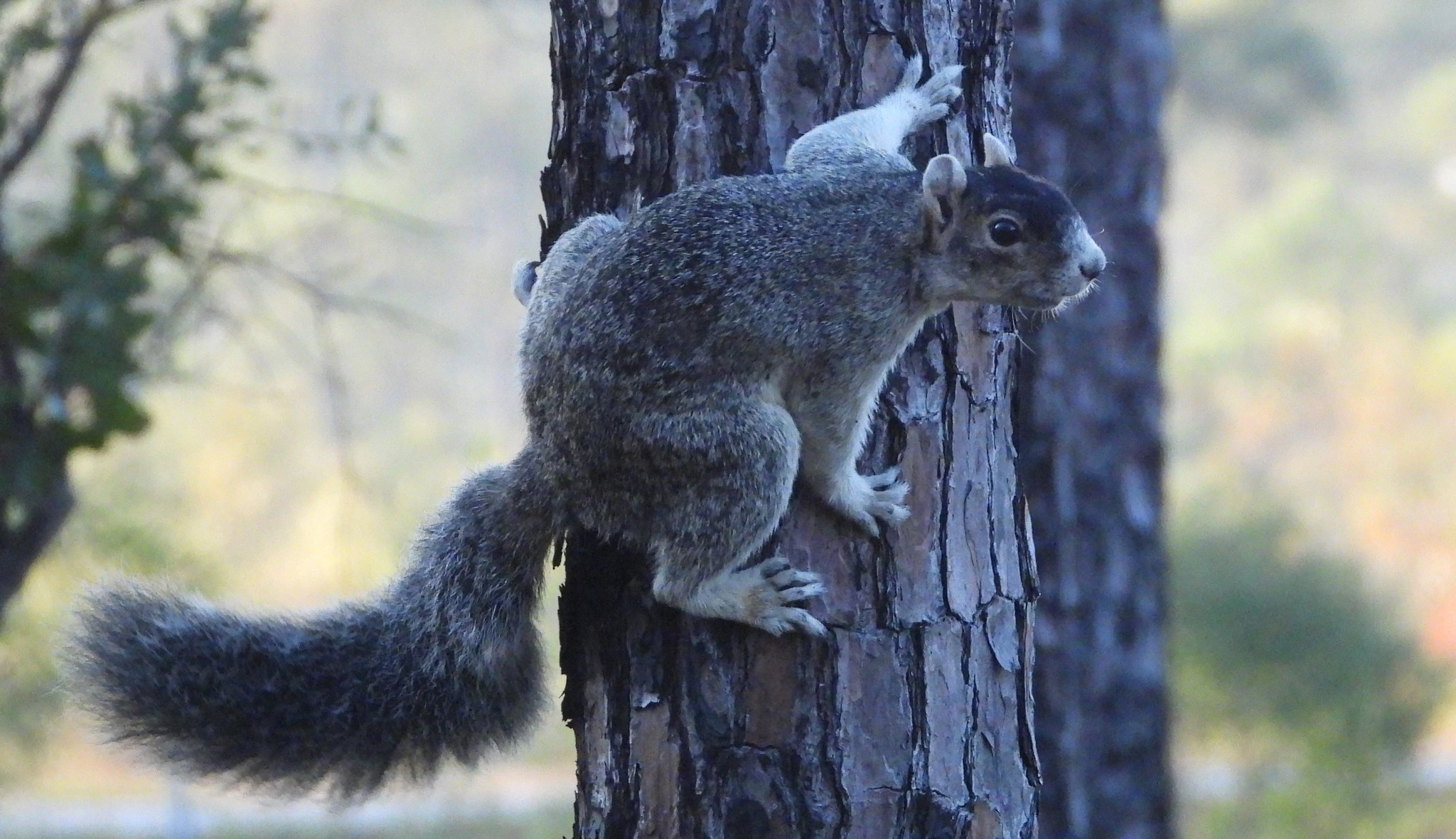

Conservation status
- Secure (NatureServe)

Scientific classification
- Kingdom: Animalia
- Phylum: Chordata
- Class: Mammalia
- Order: Rodentia
- Family: Sciuridae
- Genus: Sciurus
- Species: S. niger
- Subspecies: S. n. niger

Trinomial name
- Sciurus niger niger Linnaeus, 1758

= Southern fox squirrel =

Subspecies of mammal

The Southern fox squirrel (Sciurus niger niger) is a subspecies of the fox squirrel. They are native to the eastern United States and currently reside in North Carolina, South Carolina, and Georgia. They can also be found in parts of southern Virginia, southeastern Alabama, and the panhandle of Florida. Their life expectancy in the wild is between 6–7 years, but individuals have been known to live up to 20 in captivity. Southern fox squirrels are a diurnal species.

Sherman's fox squirrel (Sciurus niger shermani) is very similar to the southern fox squirrel to the point that there is still debate in the scientific community as to whether they are the same species.

== Anatomy and morphology ==
The southern fox squirrel can vary in length from 20–26 inches (51–66 cm) and they can weigh from 1.5–2.6 pounds (0.68–1.18 kg). They are about double the size of the much more common eastern gray squirrel. The males and females are not sexually dimorphic and can be difficult to distinguish in the wild.

Southern fox squirrels have a wide variety of color morphs and have been considered to have the widest variety of coloring among the tree squirrels. Their most prominent feature is their white ears and white nose band. The different color morphs can include colors like gray, brown, or black. They are also known to have a black "mask-like" coloring on their faces. The majority of southern fox squirrels are identifiable by their black coloration; one theory is that this feature is thought to have emerged due to the abundance of ash from fires in their native longleaf pine habitat. It is thought they exhibit this ability as a result of crypsis. Another theory is that they evolved this black coloration for thermal advantages.

== Distribution and habitat ==
Southern fox squirrels prefer to live in longleaf pine savannas, but also live in pine or mixed pine forests. These forests are woodland habitats with open understories and sparse vegetation. Southern fox squirrels have two types of nests, leaf nests and den nests. Den nests are remodeled cavities in trees that they use as nurseries in winter seasons. If den nests are not available, southern fox squirrels will build waterproof leaf nests from twigs, leaves, moss, and grasses. These nests can sometimes be found in or around parks and golf courses.

== Behavior ==
=== Breeding ===
Southern fox squirrels tend to have around 2 litters per year with 1–6 kits per litter. There are two peaks in breeding each year, late winter and late summer. They tend to breed more often in winter seasons than summer seasons.

=== Diet ===
Southern fox squirrels are omnivores and are considered opportunistic feeders. The southern fox squirrel's diet consists of insects, bird eggs, birds, roots, fruits, seeds, nuts, fungi, and woody plants.

== Taxonomy ==
Despite the visual differences between the southern fox squirrel, Bachman's fox squirrel (Sciurus niger bachmani) and Sherman's fox squirrel (Sciurus niger shermani), research shows that these three subspecies might not be genetically distinct enough to be considered separate subspecies. Some scientists also suggest that, because of the similar genetics, fox squirrels north of the Florida Caloosahatchee river should all be grouped into southern fox squirrel (Sciurus niger niger). The Latin name is formed from the Greek word sciurus meaning "shade tail" and the Latin word niger meaning "black".

== Conservation status ==
The southern fox squirrel is not considered an endangered species and is currently labeled as a secure subspecies by NatureServe. However, their preferred habitat, the longleaf pine savannas, have been decreasing. In addition, southern fox squirrels thrive in areas that have frequent prescribed burns. With the rise of habitat fragmentation, species conflict, and wildfire suppression in their preferred habitat, southern fox squirrel populations have been on a decline.

Southern fox squirrels also compete with other species such as the eastern gray squirrel. The eastern gray squirrel limits the range of the southern fox squirrel, because fox squirrels are unlikely to remain in an area where eastern gray squirrels are also present.
