= Odontolytes angusticollis =

Scientific classification
- Kingdom: Animalia
- Phylum: Arthropoda
- Clade: Pancrustacea
- Class: Insecta
- Order: Coleoptera
- Suborder: Polyphaga
- Infraorder: Scarabaeiformia
- Family: Scarabaeidae
- Genus: Odontolytes
- Species: O. angusticollis

Binomial name
- Odontolytes angusticollis (Schmidt, 1909)

Synonyms
- Ataenius angusticollis Schmidt, 1909; Auperia angusticollis

Species of beetle

Odontolytes angusticollis is a species of beetle of the family Scarabaeidae. It is found in Bolivia.

== Description ==
Adults reach a length of about 6–7.5 mm (0.24–0.30 in). They have a strongly convex, glabrous, moderately shining, dark castaneous body.

== Life history ==
Specimens have been collected in tropical transition forests.
