= Odontolytes teutoniae =

Scientific classification
- Kingdom: Animalia
- Phylum: Arthropoda
- Clade: Pancrustacea
- Class: Insecta
- Order: Coleoptera
- Suborder: Polyphaga
- Infraorder: Scarabaeiformia
- Family: Scarabaeidae
- Genus: Odontolytes
- Species: O. teutoniae

Binomial name
- Odontolytes teutoniae (Stebnicka, 2002)

Synonyms
- Auperia teutoniae Stebnicka, 2002

Species of beetle

Odontolytes teutoniae is a species of beetle of the family Scarabaeidae. It is found in Brazil (Bahia, Espírito Santo, Minas Gerais, Rio de Janeiro, Santa Catarina).

== Description ==
Adults reach a length of about 4.8–5 mm (0.19–0.20 in). The body is glossy and reddish brown. The head is punctate and the pronotum has punctures of two sizes, fine and coarse. The elytral interstriae are glossy.
