= Odontolytes capitosus =

Scientific classification
- Kingdom: Animalia
- Phylum: Arthropoda
- Clade: Pancrustacea
- Class: Insecta
- Order: Coleoptera
- Suborder: Polyphaga
- Infraorder: Scarabaeiformia
- Family: Scarabaeidae
- Genus: Odontolytes
- Species: O. capitosus

Binomial name
- Odontolytes capitosus (Harold, 1867)

Synonyms
- Ataenius capitosus Harold, 1867

Species of beetle

Odontolytes capitosus is a species of beetle of the family Scarabaeidae. It is found in Bolivia, Brazil (Acre, Espírito Santo, Mato Grosso, Rondônia), Colombia, Costa Rica, Ecuador, El Salvador, French Guiana, Guatemala, Mexico (Chiapas, Oaxaca, Veracruz), Panama and Peru.

== Description ==
Adults reach a length of about 6–8 mm (0.24–0.31 in). The body is oval and piceous. The head is densely punctate with fine punctures and the clypeus is emarginate. The pronotum has punctures of moderate size, separated by their diameter.

== Life history ==
Specimens have been collected at altitudes from 250 to 1200 metres and on basal debris of Bactris species. Some specimens were also found in forest litter.
