= Green Swamp Wilderness Preserve =

Coordinates: 28.35°N 82.00°W

wGreen Swamp Wilderness Preserve is a 110,000 acre preserve in the Green Swamp in the four-corner area of Lake County, Pasco County, Polk County and Sumter County, east of Dade City, Florida. It includes a 36-mile section of the Withlacoochee River and offers hiking trails. It is managed by the Southwest Florida Water Management District. It includes various habitats and is home to a wide array of wildlife. The preserve is divided into five areas: 5,067 acre Colt Creek State Park, the 51,149 acre East Tract; the 11,052 acre Hampton Tract; the 4,446 acre Little Withlacoochee Tract; and the 37,350 acre West Tract.

== History ==
During the 1800s and into the early 1900s some families lived in these areas. They built ranches, had orange groves and lived an old Florida lifestyle. The Green Swamp is mostly being reclaimed by nature so it looks a lot different than it did in the early days, but those remnants still do remain in the swamp. There was a railroad line that was close by as well and many folks lived along them when trains were one of the main sources for transportation.

In 1974, 322,000 acres of the Green Swamp region were designated an Area of Critical State Concern. Purchases began in the early 1970s and are ongoing.

== Recreation ==
The Green Swamp is a popular destination for birding, hiking, trail running, bicycling, equestrian, fishing, canoeing, kayaking, and hunting. It is also popular among trail runners with the Skunk Ape Night Run and the Skunk Ape's Revenge that take place every year. Dances With Dirt used to be a popular race that once was held in the Green Swamp.

== See also ==
Lower Green Swamp Preserve
