= Odontolytes domingo =

Scientific classification
- Kingdom: Animalia
- Phylum: Arthropoda
- Clade: Pancrustacea
- Class: Insecta
- Order: Coleoptera
- Suborder: Polyphaga
- Infraorder: Scarabaeiformia
- Family: Scarabaeidae
- Genus: Odontolytes
- Species: O. domingo

Binomial name
- Odontolytes domingo (Stebnicka, 2002)

Synonyms
- Auperia domingo Stebnicka, 2002

Species of beetle

Odontolytes domingo is a species of beetle of the family Scarabaeidae. It is found in Costa Rica and Ecuador.

== Description ==
Adults reach a length of about 4.8–5 mm (0.19–0.20 in). They have an elongate, shining, castaneous body.
