= Odontolytes tectipennis =

Scientific classification
- Kingdom: Animalia
- Phylum: Arthropoda
- Clade: Pancrustacea
- Class: Insecta
- Order: Coleoptera
- Suborder: Polyphaga
- Infraorder: Scarabaeiformia
- Family: Scarabaeidae
- Genus: Odontolytes
- Species: O. tectipennis

Binomial name
- Odontolytes tectipennis (Stebnicka & Skelley, 2005)

Synonyms
- Auperia tectipennis Stebnicka & Skelley, 2005

Species of beetle

Odontolytes tectipennis is a species of beetle of the family Scarabaeidae. It is found in Ecuador and Bolivia.

== Description ==
Adults reach a length of about 4–4.3 mm (0.16–0.17 in). They have an elongate, dark brown to piceous, alutaceous body.

== Etymology ==
The species name is derived from tectiform (meaning roof-like) and pennis (meaning feather or wing) and refers to its distinctive elytral intervals.
