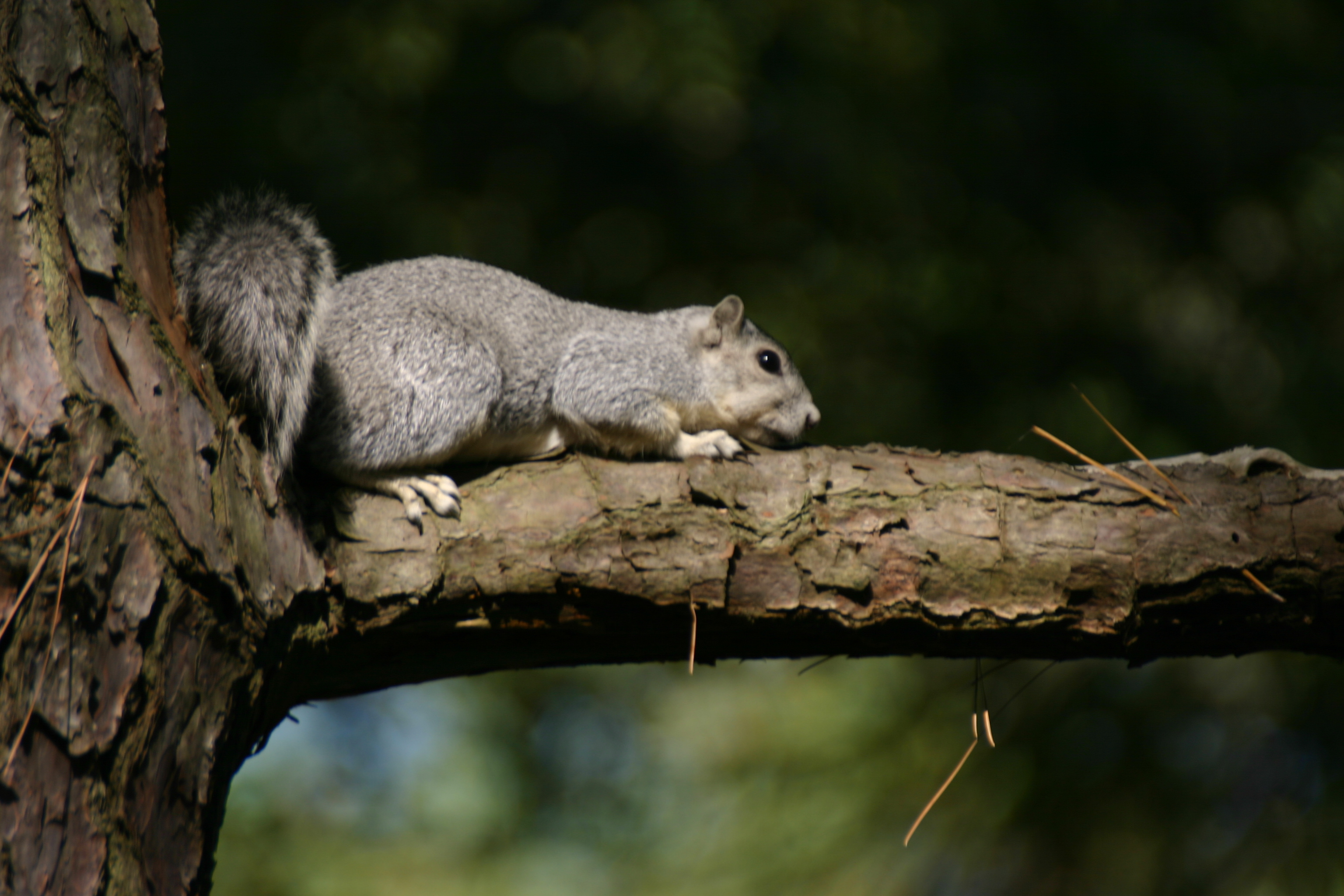

Conservation status
- Vulnerable (NatureServe)

- Delisted (ESA)

Scientific classification
- Domain: Eukaryota
- Kingdom: Animalia
- Phylum: Chordata
- Class: Mammalia
- Order: Rodentia
- Family: Sciuridae
- Genus: Sciurus
- Species: S. niger
- Subspecies: S. n. cinereus

Trinomial name
- Sciurus niger cinereus Linnaeus, 1758

= Delmarva fox squirrel =

Subspecies of rodent

The Delmarva fox squirrel (Sciurus niger cinereus) is a formerly endangered subspecies of the fox squirrel. It is native to the eastern United States. The Delmarva fox squirrel was removed from the Endangered Species List effective December 2015.

== Background ==
The Delmarva fox squirrel (Sciurus niger cinereus) was an endangered subspecies of the fox squirrel. Its historical range included the Delmarva Peninsula, southeastern Pennsylvania and southern New Jersey, but its natural occurrence is now limited to parts of the Eastern Shore of Maryland and Virginia. In these areas, the Delmarva fox squirrel's habitat has been degraded and its survivability rates have decreased. It has, however, been successfully reintroduced into other parts of its historical range.

Like all fox squirrels, the Delmarva fox squirrel has a full, fluffy tail. The Delmarva fox squirrel is frosty silver to slate gray with a white belly and can grow to be 75 centimetres (30 in) long, including up to 38 centimetres (15 in) of tail. They weigh around 3 pounds.

Like many squirrel species, Delmarva fox squirrels use trees to elude predators. Their preferred habitat is mature forest of both hardwood and pine trees with an open understory. An open understory within the forest is needed for the squirrels to successfully feed on nuts and seeds of the many trees such as oaks, hickories, sweet gum, walnut, and loblolly pine during the fall season when these trees are dispersing their seeds. In the summer and early fall they often feed on mature green pine cones. Other less important food sources include buds, fruits, insects, and grain.

These fox squirrels prefer to make their dens in the hollows of trees. However, they will also make a nest of leaves and twigs in the crotch of a tree, in a tangle of vines on a tree trunk, or near the end of a large branch.

Mating occurs in late winter and early spring. Gestation is about 44 days, with most young born between February and April. Litters average 1–6 young, which the female raises by herself.

Over the past several years, the populations of Delmarva fox squirrels have been declining rapidly and in 1967 the U.S. Fish and Wildlife Service listed them as an endangered species.

== Conservation ==
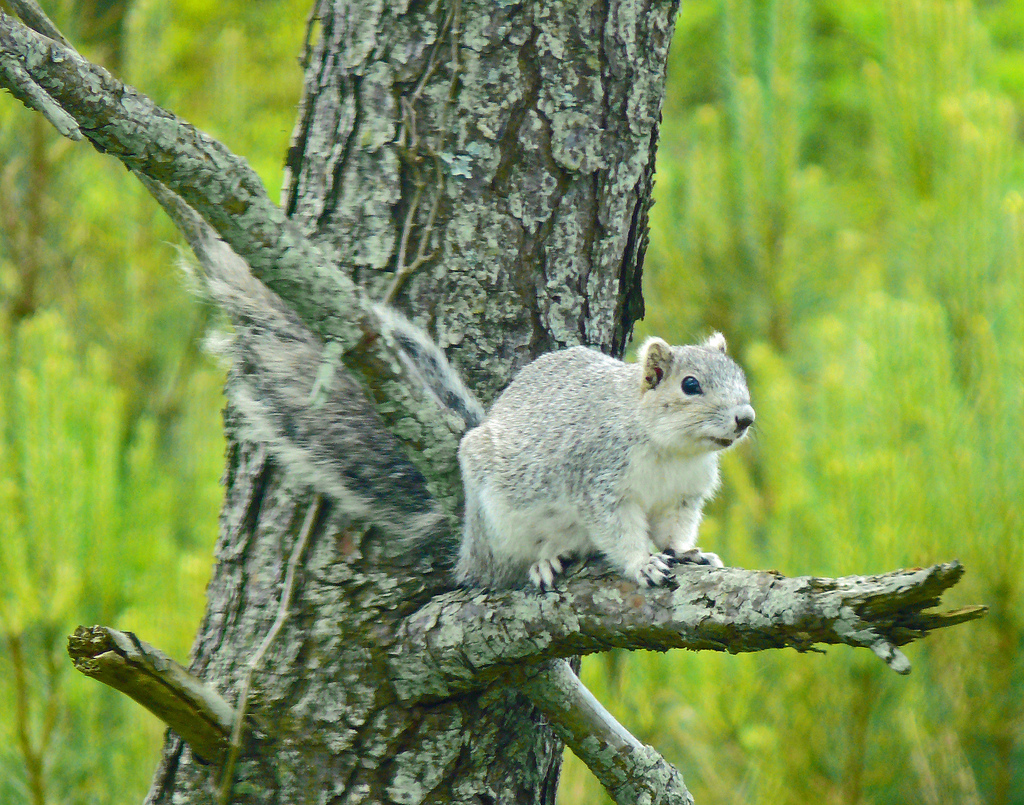
A Delmarva fox squirrel in Chincoteague National Wildlife Refuge

The Delmarva fox squirrel was listed as an endangered species by the U.S. Fish and Wildlife Service in 1967. A recovery plan was developed in 1979 and revised in 1983 and 1993. A principal strategy for species recovery is protection of its habitat.

The Delmarva fox squirrel was listed as an endangered species in 1967 because only 10% of its historical population was remaining. The cause of their significant decline in individuals was due to overhunting and habitat loss or destruction. Habitat destruction has been influenced by timber harvesting and farm land production. Housing developments, roads and increased commercial property are some other major factors for the continued loss of habitat. Along with human-induced causes, predation plays a large role in the decline of numbers. Red and gray foxes, weasels, mink, eagles and other animals are the cause of high predation rates as the Delmarva fox squirrel's habitat is within their range.

Many efforts have been made to restore habitat and increase the number of Delmarva fox squirrels within their historical range.

In 1979, the first recovery plan was developed to protect the habitat and increase the population of the Delmarva fox squirrel. In completing this plan, the biologists projected that the habitat would become more suitable to the lifestyle of the squirrels as well as other animals that share the same habitat. The plan consisted of 11 sites in Maryland that attempted to reintroduce between 8 and 42 individuals within a 1–3 year process. At each site the same number of males and females were released to assess the reproduction rates and survivability of each sex. Many tests were done after reintroduction by live trapping and recruitment within 9 of the overall 11 sites.

In a more recent conservation effort, many private and publicly owned lands were used to serve as habitat restoration areas. Private lands within the Delmarva fox squirrel range constitute for ~87% of the entire historical range of the DFS, while only 13% is of public land. A relationship between both public and private land owners allowed habitat restoration to occur in the 1990s. Different techniques were used by the Chesapeake Bay/Susquehanna River Ecoteam on public lands to monitor and reintroduce the Delmarva fox squirrel. Many private land owners also contributed to the restoration process by allowing biologists to access their land.

Within the recovery plan made in the late 1970s, the idea of translocations was a prominent tool used to increase the population of the Delmarva fox squirrel. The most recent effort allowed for trapping and relocation of the Delmarva fox squirrel to different habitats that would allow them to survive. The major goals were to reduce the probability of extinction, restore ecological diversity, and broaden the involvement of many areas in conservation effort. Eighty-three squirrels were used in this effort and they were all radio-collared for post-release tracking. The radio collars let biologists study the range and movements of the squirrels and tracked the distance traveled within a certain time period.

The Delmarva fox squirrel conservation effort has been an increasing success. The population within the historical range has increased and the many efforts have allowed for the habitats to become better suited for the Delmarva fox squirrel. Many issues have threatened the Delmarva fox squirrel with extinction, but continued work to restore habitat must be done in order for this species to have a sustainable population and for the Delmarva fox squirrel to remain off the Endangered Species List.
