= Odontolytes rondoniae =

Scientific classification
- Kingdom: Animalia
- Phylum: Arthropoda
- Clade: Pancrustacea
- Class: Insecta
- Order: Coleoptera
- Suborder: Polyphaga
- Infraorder: Scarabaeiformia
- Family: Scarabaeidae
- Genus: Odontolytes
- Species: O. rondoniae

Binomial name
- Odontolytes rondoniae (Stebnicka, 2002)

Synonyms
- Auperia rondoniae Stebnicka, 2002

Species of beetle

Odontolytes rondoniae is a species of beetle of the family Scarabaeidae. It is found in Brazil (Amazonas, Rondônia).

== Description ==
Adults reach a length of about 6.5–7 mm (0.26–0.28 in). The body is dark reddish brown. The head is coarsely punctate and the clypeus is sinuate. The pronotum has punctures of two sizes, with fine punctures mixed with coarser larger ones.

== Life history ==
Specimens have been collected in tropical rainforests.
