= Odontolytes waoraniae =

Scientific classification
- Kingdom: Animalia
- Phylum: Arthropoda
- Clade: Pancrustacea
- Class: Insecta
- Order: Coleoptera
- Suborder: Polyphaga
- Infraorder: Scarabaeiformia
- Family: Scarabaeidae
- Genus: Odontolytes
- Species: O. waoraniae

Binomial name
- Odontolytes waoraniae (Stebnicka & Skelley, 2005)

Synonyms
- Auperia waoraniae Stebnicka & Skelley, 2005

Species of beetle

Odontolytes waoraniae is a species of beetle of the family Scarabaeidae. It is found in Ecuador and Suriname.

== Description ==
Adults reach a length of about 5.8–6 mm (0.23–0.24 in). They have an elongate, dark brown to piceous, feebly shiny body.
