= Colt Creek State Park =

State park in Florida, United States

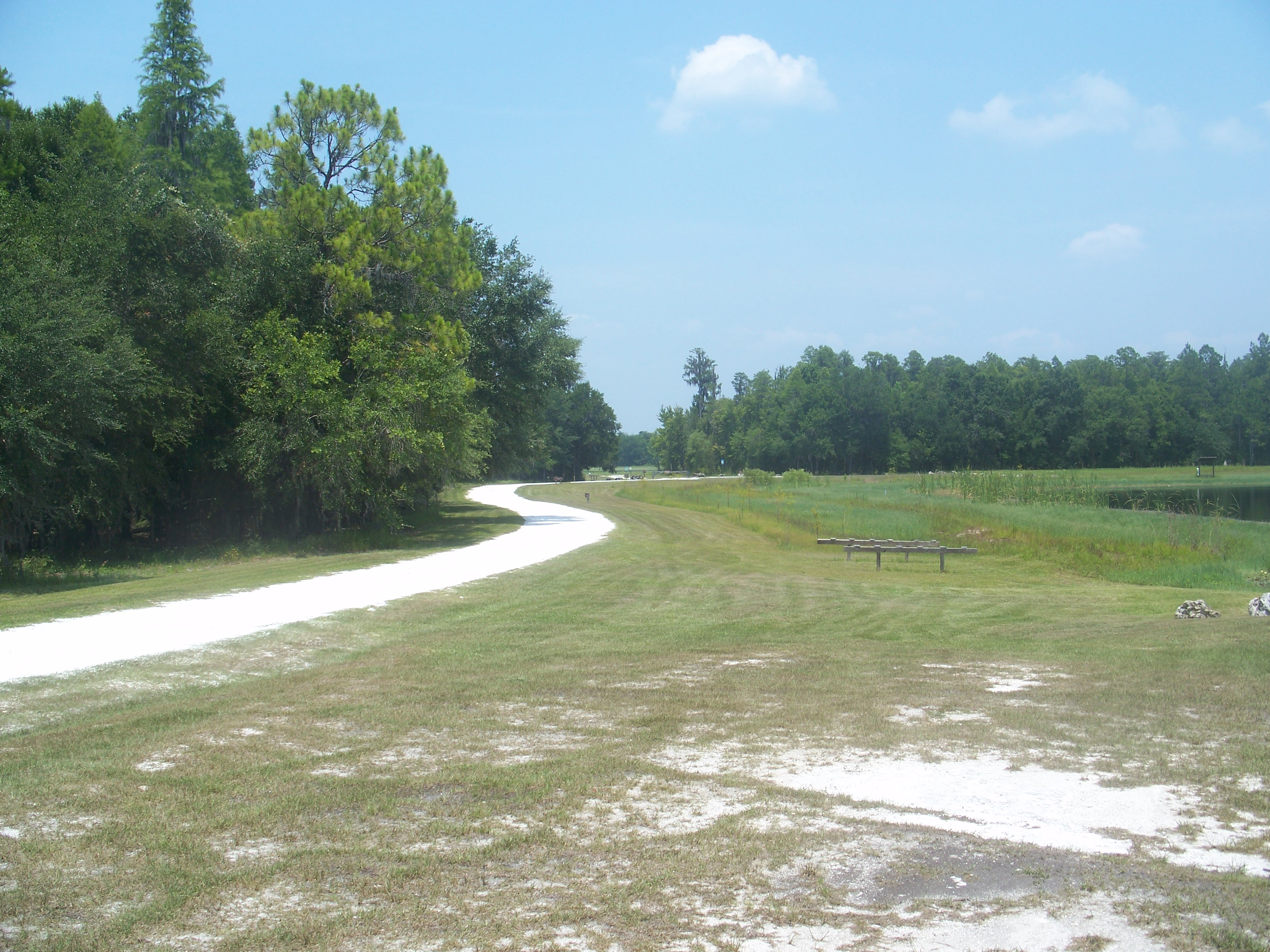

- Location within Florida Location within the United States
- Interactive map of Colt Creek State Park
- Location: Polk County, Florida, USA
- Nearest city: Lakeland
- Coordinates: 28°18′12″N 82°3′21″W
- Area: 5,067 acres (20.51 km^{2})
- Governing body: Florida Department of Environmental Protection

Colt Creek State Park is a Florida State Park in Central Florida, 16 miles (26 km) north of Lakeland off of State Road 471. This 5,067-acre park nestled within the Green Swamp Wilderness Area and named after one of the tributaries that flows through the property was opened to the public on January 20, 2007. Composed mainly of pine flatwoods, cypress domes and open pasture land, this piece of pristine wilderness is home to many animal species including the American bald eagle, Southern fox squirrel, gopher tortoise, white-tailed deer, wild turkey and bobcat.

The park offers over 15 miles of multi-use trails which make for horse-back riding, hiking and biking opportunities. These trails meander through the pine flatwoods and cypress domes, bottomland forest and past open pastures. The park offers fishing, canoeing and kayaking at one of its three lakes. Other recreational opportunities include picnic pavilions, ranger-led programs and primitive and full-facility camping options.

It is part of a series of landholdings that make up the Green Swamp Wilderness Area and managed by the Florida Department of Environmental Protection's Florida Park Service.

== History ==
Before 1940 the land was owned by John Keen and was used for industrial operations including harvesting resin from pine trees, which could later be processed into turpentine. Collection of resin utilized the "Herty system", which involved making V-shaped cuts into the tree and allowing the resin to drain through steel gutters and into pots called "Herty pots". Trees used in this way were called "cat-face trees" because the marks left in the tree resemble a cat's face. Cat-face trees and Herty pots can still be found throughout the park.

The Overstreet family purchased the property in 1940 and used the land for beef cattle production, silviculture, hunting and limestone mining operations.

In the 1960s the Overstreet family built a modest single-room lodge called "Deadhead Lodge". The lodge was used as temporary accommodation while hunting or working on the property. The lodge still stands but is not open to the public.

The land was purchased from the Overstreet family on May 31, 2006, and opened to the public as Florida's 160th state park on January 20, 2007. The 5,067-acre parcel was a joint purchase between Southwest Florida Water Management District, the Florida Department of Environmental Protection and Polk County Natural Resources division, with the Florida Park Service taking the role as the lead managing agency.

The park's inaugural Unit Management Plan was approved on December 14, 2007. The plan serves as the basic statement of park policy and direction for the management of the park. The Unit Management Plan sets forth plans for the next 10 years and functions as a guide for future installation of amenities, management of resources and habitat restoration projects. Unit Management Plans are created with input from relevant professionals and with public participation.

During the first two years as a Florida State Park, the park installed a "starter kit" at the Middle Lake Parking area. This included a pavilion, restrooms, water fountain, kiosk and accessible parking spot. A portable trailer was used as an administrative office. Several miles of dirt roads once used by the Overstreet family for commercial operations were converted into hiking trails by the Florida Park Service; unused roads were allowed to re-vegetate. The park's first trailhead was installed at the Middle Lake parking area.

Beginning in 2010 and through to 2015, an extensive hydrological restoration project was conducted at Colt Creek, with the goal of restoring the creek's natural and historical water flow.

In 2012 the park expanded its amenities to include a large screened pavilion with attached restrooms and paved parking area overlooking Mac Lake. A 75' accessible fishing/observation dock was installed at Mac Lake. Two smaller pavilions and a Ranger Station were also constructed at this time. Parking and trail access was added at trail marker number 36, which can be accessed along the park's main drive.

In 2014, a small group of park enthusiast created a charitable organization to support the park. The organization was created as a Florida State Park's Citizen Support Organization and is affectionately referred to as the "Friends of Colt Creek State Park".

In 2015 the park opened a 10 campsite primitive equestrian campground, which was expanded to 20 campsites in 2017.

In 2016 a hydrological restoration project was completed at Gator Creek. The project restored adequate flow and drainage to the creek and surrounding floodplain forests.

In 2017 the park created the South parking area which includes parking for standard vehicles and vehicles towing horse trailers, as well as trail access.

In 2018 the park opened a 34 site full-facility campground.

== Geology and Hydrogeology ==
Limestone can be seen at the surface of the ground throughout the park. Limestone is a porous rock that acts as a sponge to absorb and hold water for long periods of time, which make the limestone outcroppings below the surface play an important role in water retention.

The land plays an important role within the floodplain of the Green Swamp region since the water that flows off the property eventually makes its way to four of Florida's major rivers - Withlacochee, Hillsborough, Peace and Ocklawaha.

The park has three named creeks and several smaller unnamed tributaries. The park's land slopes gradually to the northwest, toward the Withlacochee River. As a result, water from most of the park's creeks eventually merge into Gator creek, which ultimately empties into the Withlachoochee River.

The park is part of the Green Swamp Wilderness Area, which is a major recharge area for the Floridan Aquifer. The Floridan Aquifer provides drinking water to millions of Florida residents, and the aquifer flows into several springs throughout the state. The majority of the park is within the Withlachoochee River basin, though a smaller portion is within the Hillsborough River basin.

Many natural wetlands exist in the park, including cypress domes, depression marshes and floodplain forests. The overall health of the park's ecosystem is important to the quality of water that eventually makes its way into the Floridan Aquifer and several of Florida's major rivers.

== Ecosystem ==
The park's habitat consist primarily of mesic flatwoods co-dominated by cypress domes, hardwood hammocks and wetlands. Lands within the park are relatively flat, with an average elevation of 90 feet above sea level. Additionally, natural-looking lakes that formed from old lime rock mining operations are present. The park is home to many wildlife species.

=== Mesic Pine flatwoods ===
The mesic flatwoods are the most widespread of the park's upland communities, consisting of an open canopy of longleaf (Pinus palustris) and slash (Pinus elliottii) pine with an understory of low shrubs, grasses, saw palmetto, gallberry (Ilex glabra) and wiregrass. Longleaf pine habitat is considered endangered by the International Union for Conservation of Nature. Longleaf pine habitat is important for many species including the Southern Fox squirrel. Longleaf pine habitat is fire-dependent, meaning it relies on occasional fires to clear groundcover overgrowth, recycle nutrients into the soil and germinate certain kinds of seeds. The exposed outcroppings of limestone throughout the area is an unusual feature for mesic flatwoods, this uniqueness makes the protection of the park's flatwoods essential.

=== Mesic Hardwood Hammocks ===
The mesic hammocks consist of a closed canopy of southern live oak (Quercus virginiana), cabbage palm (Sabal palmetto) and American sweetgum (Liquidambar styraciflua) trees with an understory of saw palmetto, American beautyberry (Callicarpa americana), yaupon (Ilex vomitoria) and muscadine grape (Vitis rotundifolia). Hardwood hammocks thrive in the absence of fire and the soil is generally moist due to the shade of the canopy.

=== Cypress Domes and wetlands ===
The park's cypress domes mainly consist of bald cypress (Taxodium distichum) interspersed with the occasional water oak (Quercus nigra) and laurel oak (Quercus laurifolia) and are found in areas of lower terrain where water coalesces easily. The interior groundcover of the cypress domes is generally dominated by sawgrass (Cladium jamaicensis). Cypress domes are a type of freshwater forested wetland and form mainly when cypress trees grow in shallow water. The characteristic "dome" shape is the result of older larger trees growing in the center of the dome while younger shorter trees grow around the fringes. In some cases, the water in the center of a dome is a too deep for cypress to grow, causing a "donut" shape to the cypress dome. Cypress domes rely on fires to reduce encroachment by other plant species. Due to the gentle sloping elevation of the land, water from the surrounding region flows into the park and helps to maintain the park's cypress domes and wetlands, as does seasonal fluctuating rainfall. Cypress domes provide habitat for wood storks (Mycteria americana), cottonmouths (Agkistrodon piscivorus) and Florida black bears (Ursus americanus floridanus).

Depression marshes are rare in the park and are characterized as shallow depressions with herbaceous vegetation and/or small shrubs including maidencane (Panicum hemotomon), sand cordgrass (Spartina bakeri) and others.

Floodplain forests occupy some low-lying areas adjacent to tributaries, especially Gator Creek and Colt Creek. Species present in these areas include bald cypress, water oak, laurel oak, sweetgum and others. The canopy is mostly closed and the soil is moist due to drainage from the creeks and low levels of sunlight penetrating to the forest floor. Swamp areas can be found within the floodplain forests with Alligatorflag (Thalia geniculata) common within areas devoid of trees where depressions hold water yearlong.

=== Lakes ===
In the 1990s the former property owners engaged in a limestone mining operation that included the digging of several large pits. After the operation was abandoned, the pits eventually filled with water and are now natural-looking lakes, which provide additional habitat for numerous species of aquatic plants and animals. Some areas of the mining operation breached the Floridan Aquifer, allowing water to escape into the lakes. At 26 acres, Mac Lake is the largest of the park's three lakes. A bathymetric survey conducted by the Florida Fish and Wildlife Conservation Commission determined the deepest point of Mac Lake to be 50' deep. Cattails can be found around the shore of the lake, providing additional habitat for wildlife. Other plants such as rushes and sedges are present. Common fish observed in the lakes include catfish, largemouth bass and bluegill. Alligators, wading birds, and various species of fish and reptile have been observed at the park's lakes.

=== Wildlife ===
The park is home to several types of habitat which results in a mixed bag of species. Commonly observed animals include white-tailed deer, bobcat, marsh rabbit, diamondback rattlesnake, cottonmouth and gopher tortoise. Otters, wading birds, reptiles and alligators are common in the park's lakes and creeks. The Florida black bear has been observed in the park but is an uncommon sighting.

A park survey observed 74 species of butterflies.

The park was designated part of the Great Florida Birding Trail after a year-long survey conducted by the Lake Region Audubon Society. Lake Region Audubon Society surveyors observed 150 species of bird including the American Bald Eagle, Limpkin, Great Blue Heron, Red-shouldered hawk, American Kestrel, wild turkey and swallow-tailed kite. Several species of wading bird can be observed around the lakes and wetlands. The park is host to several migratory bird species throughout the year.

==== Designated Species ====
Notably, the park is home to several species that have been designated by state or federal agencies as at-risk; meaning certain species, subspecies or isolated populations are at-risk of declining numbers to dangerous levels due to various factors such as habitat loss. Designated species can be plants, wildlife or habitats and are protected by state or federal laws. Some species at Colt Creek State Park that have received designation include the Catesby's lily (Lilium catesbaei), the gopher tortoise, Cooper's hawk, Limpkin, Florida sandhill crane, and the Southern fox squirrel.

== Resource Management ==
=== Restoration ===
The former owners protected large portions of the land, which survive until today and are excellent representations of ecosystems native to this area. However, as many areas of the land were altered by private use, restoration is an ongoing process that will take time and differing approaches to restore the land to its historic condition.

Some areas where the lands natural hydrology was altered by manmade ditches and ditch blocks has been restored by removing ditch blocks and installing culverts, as well as planting aquatic plants. Some of these restoration changes were made to Gator Creek and Colt Creek and has helped to restore natural drainage and flow the creeks, as well as to wetlands. Water monitoring stations have been installed in various locations by Southwest Florida Water Management District as a means to monitor the progress of hydrological restoration projects.

Dismantling of manmade berms around natural depressions has been completed and will allow for replanting of cypress domes.

Some areas of mesic flatwood were converted to pasture or pine plantations, mined or heavily impacted by altered fire regimes. These areas are being restored by introducing controlled fires and aggressive control of invasive exotic plants. Longleaf pine saplings have been planted in some locations of open pasture.

Protecting the native ecosystems involves management of invasive exotic species such as Caeser's weed, Cogon grass and feral hogs; these species outcompete native species if they are not removed. Surveys are conducted throughout the year to identify areas requiring removal of invasive exotic species.

Florida State Parks utilize controlled prescribed fires. A controlled prescribed fire is the process of mimicking a wildfire in a controlled manner to areas that depend on fire to clear groundcover overgrowth, restore soil nutrients and germinate certain kinds of seeds. The process of a controlling the location, size and spread of the fire benefits the health of fire-dependent ecosystems while greatly reducing the likelihood of uncontrolled wildfires. Controlled fires are conducted by specially trained staff and only under very tight protocols and weather conditions. This kind of approach is appropriate for areas such as mesic flatwoods where longleaf pine communities depend on occasional wildfire.

== Recreational activities ==
=== Trails ===
The park offers over 15 miles of multi-use trails for horse-back riding, hiking and biking. These trails meander through the pine flatwoods around cypress domes, bottomland forest and past open pastures. The trails offer access to primitive hike-in sites and Metal Mark pond picnic area. Trails are identified by color blazes on trees and trail markers. Motorized vehicles are prohibited on trails. Trails are accessed via several designated parking areas. Colt Creek State Park is adjacent to the Green Swamp Hampton Tract, and there is a gate allowing park users to access the Hampton Tract trails as well.

The park also hosts some of Florida's largest trail running events. The Long Haul 100 takes place every year drawing in hundreds of runners from across the country. Even nearby, the area is popular with the Skunk Ape Night Run and the Skunk Ape's Revenge that take place every year. The Florida Run also has an event in the Colt Creek State Park.

=== Day-use areas ===
==== Mac Lake area ====
The Mac Lake area offers paved parking, three pavilions, a gazebo and access to the lake's 75' accessible fishing dock. Fishing from the dock or bank is permitted. The largest pavilion is the Great Blue Heron pavilion, which is screened and has indoor picnic tables, an outdoor grill, electrical outlets, lights and attached accessible restrooms. The Limpkin and White Ibis pavilions are open-air pavilions with picnic tables and a grill. All three pavilions and the gazebo overlook Mac Lake and can be reserved for a fee. Canoe and kayaks are located at the Mac Lake area and available for rental use by visiting the Ranger Station. There is a boat launch available at Mac Lake. Gas powered motors are prohibited on the lakes. The Mac Lake area has a quarter-mile trail that circles through mesic hammock habitat. The park's trail system can be accessed about a half a mile walk or drive from the Mac Lake area.

==== Middle Lake area ====
This area has two lakes, Middle Lake and Little Lake, respectively, and provides standard vehicle parking and an equestrian parking area. The Monarch pavilion is an open-air pavilion situated approximately halfway between the two lakes and has picnic tables, a grill and accessible restrooms. There is a canoe/kayak/boat launch at Middle Lake and bank fishing is allowed. Gas powered motors are prohibited on the lakes. The pavilion can be reserved at a fee.

==== Marker 36 ====
There is a parking area with trail access at trail marker number 36 off the park's main drive about a mile past the Ranger Station.

==== South parking area ====
The South parking area offers standard vehicle and equestrian parking and provides access to the trail system.

=== Birding ===
Colt Creek State Park was designated as part of the Great Florida Birding Trail following a year-long survey identifying 150 species of birds. Birds can be seen year-round due to the areas subtropical climate. There is an influx of species during migratory seasons.

=== Camping ===
==== Full-facility campground ====
Colt Creek State Park has 27 full-facility campsites and 6 tent-only sites. Each site has a 30 and 50 amp electric hookup, potable water spigot, picnic table, grill and fire ring. Two campsites and two tent-only campsites have accessibility features and include level concrete pads. The campground has a bathhouse with showers and restrooms, beverage and snack vending machines, ice for sale, firewood for sale and pay-per-use community washer and dryer.

==== Primitive tent-style camping ====
===== Boots or Saddles and Tired Tree primitive campsites =====
The two primitive campsites can be accessed via the park's trail system. These campsites are only accessible by foot, horseback or mountain bike. Both campsites offer a picnic table, fire ring and trash can. There is no electricity, running water or artificial light at campsites.

===== Primitive Equestrian Campground =====
The equestrian campground is a campground offering 20 campsites, each with a fire ring. Community restroom and trash cans are located nearby the campground entrance. There are shared water spigots located throughout the campground. There is a large community open-air pavilion with picnic tables in the campground. Proof of a negative Coggins test within the past year is required for any horse entering the park.

===== Primitive Group Campground =====
The primitive group campground can only be reserved by organized groups and with preference given to youth organizations. The primitive campground has a community restroom (no running water) and trash cans, three fire rings and picnic tables. There is no electricity, running water or artificial light at the campground.

=== Interpretive Programs ===
The park offers educational programs including ranger-guided hikes and tram tours, recreational-based programs such as fishing clinics and canoeing introduction classes, and programs for youth such as the Junior Ranger program. Seasonal or themed programs may be offered.

=== Pets ===
Domesticated pets are permitted in designated day-use areas, trails and campsites per the Florida State Park's pet policy. Pets must be kept on a handheld leash that is six feet or shorter and be well-behaved at all times. Pets are prohibited from entering public buildings with the exception of service animals.

== Citizen Support Organization ==
The park benefits from a Citizen Support Organization named "the Friends of Colt Creek State Park". The organization is a 501(c)3 nonprofit established to provide support for the park via volunteerism, financial contributions and by raising awareness. The Friends of Colt Creek State Park were founded in March 2014 and are governed by a volunteer Board of Directors. The Friends of Colt Creek State Park collaborate with the park's management in identifying areas where they can assist. Notable support by the Friends of Colt Creek State Park include the installation of an attractive lakeside gazebo, the purchase of a customized tram, the construction of a pavilion in the equestrian campground and organizing annual family-oriented events. The Friends of Colt Creek State Park maintain a social media page on FB, website and sells branded merchandise at the park.

== Gallery ==
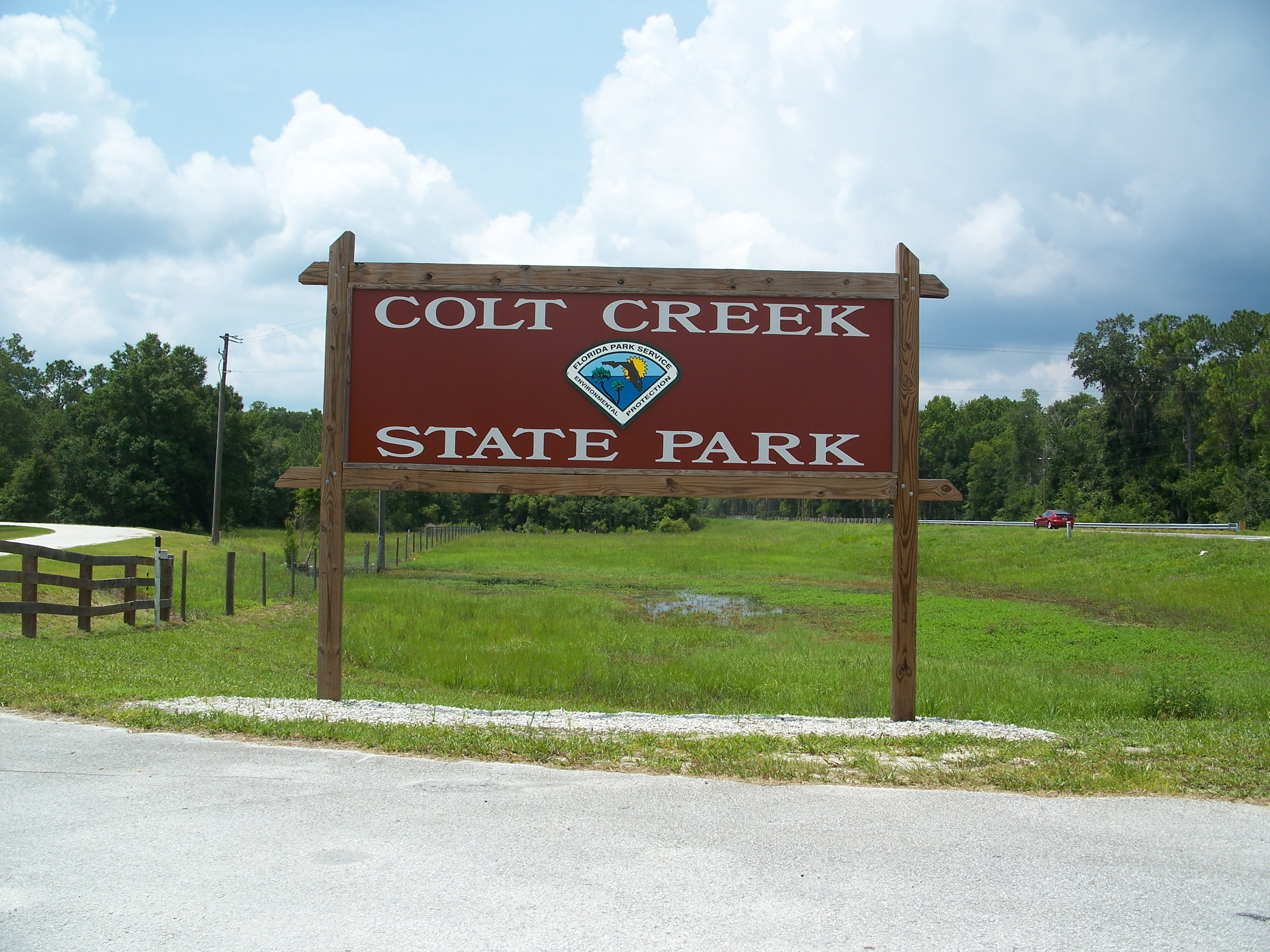

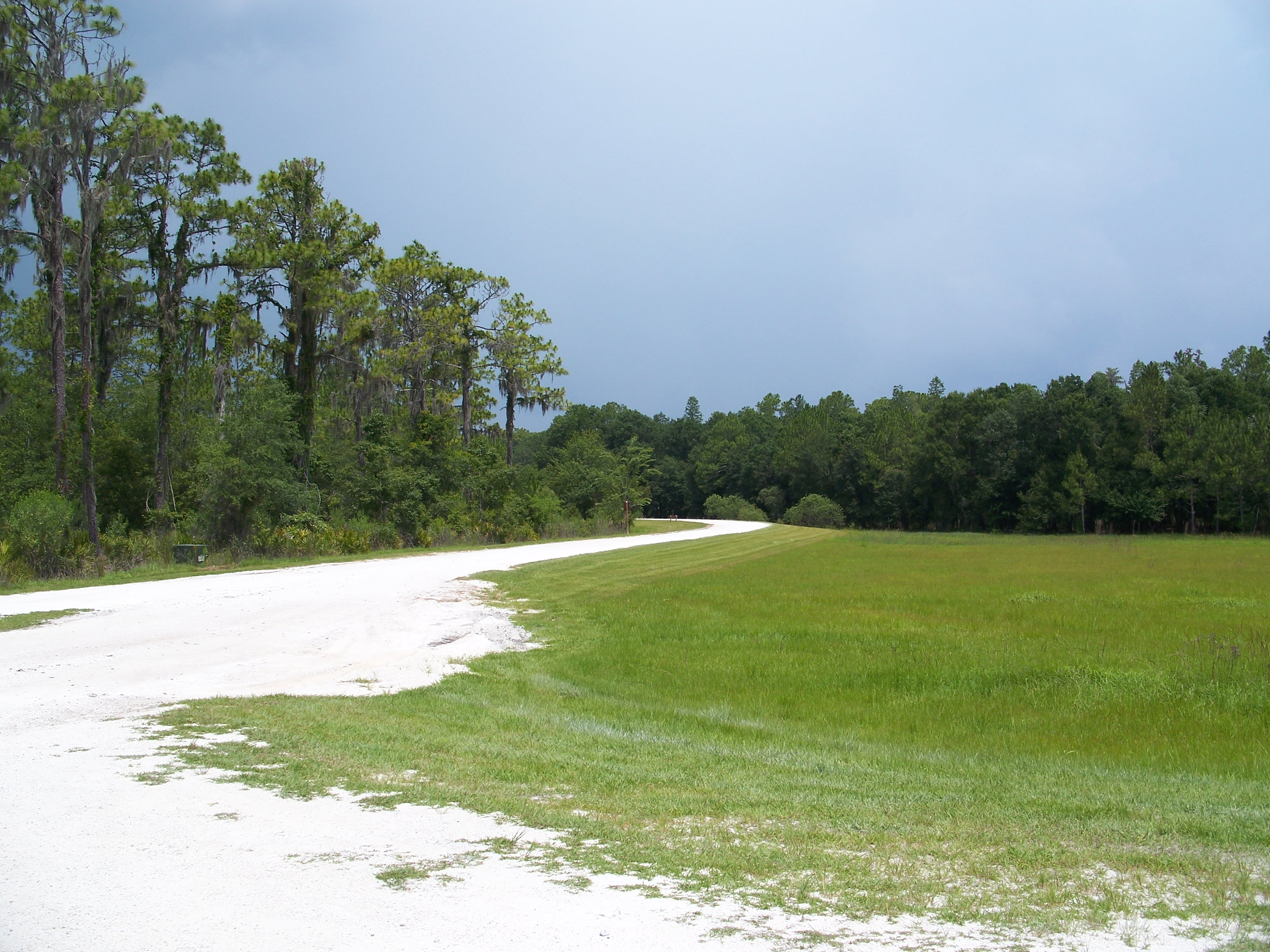

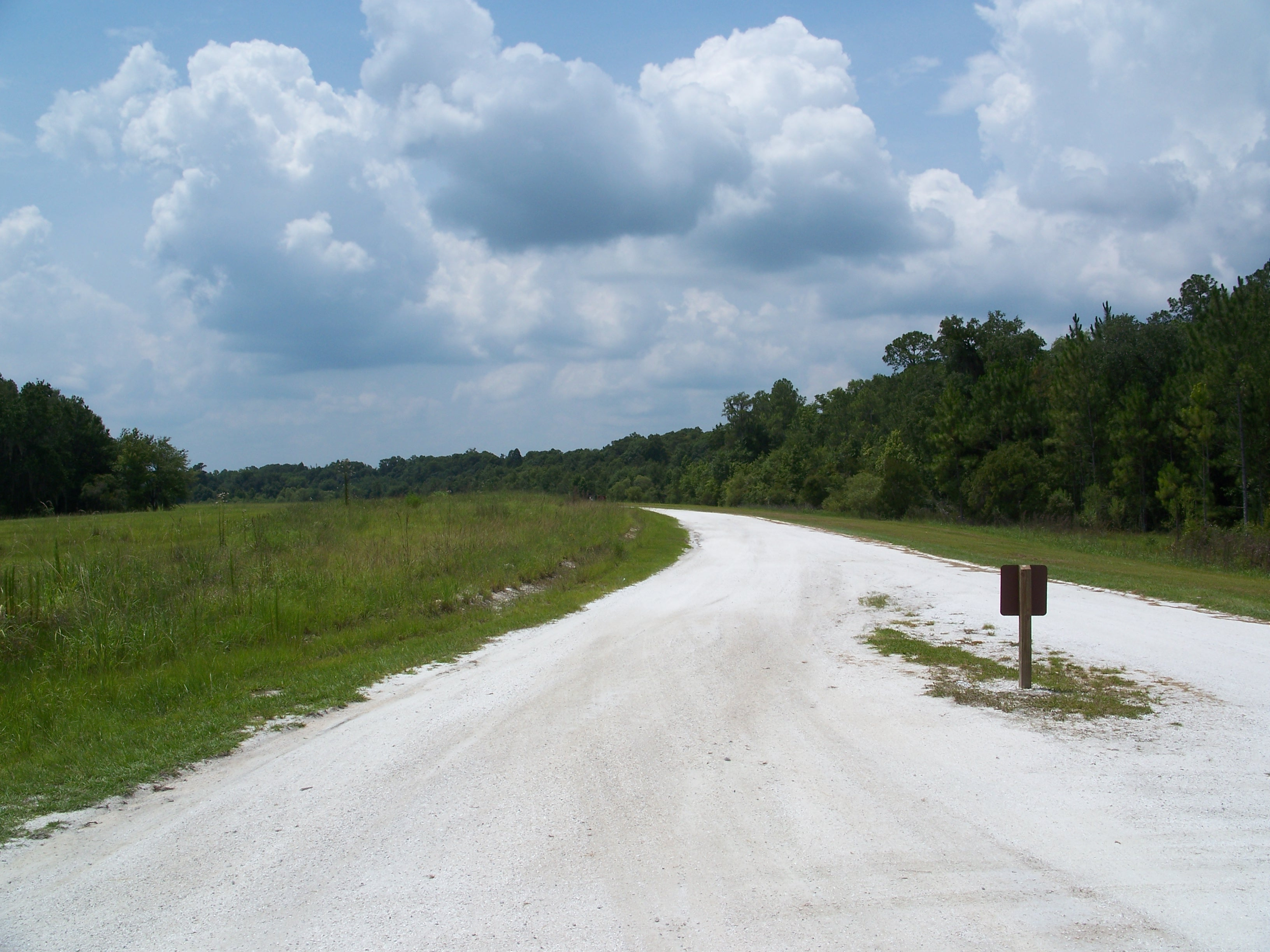

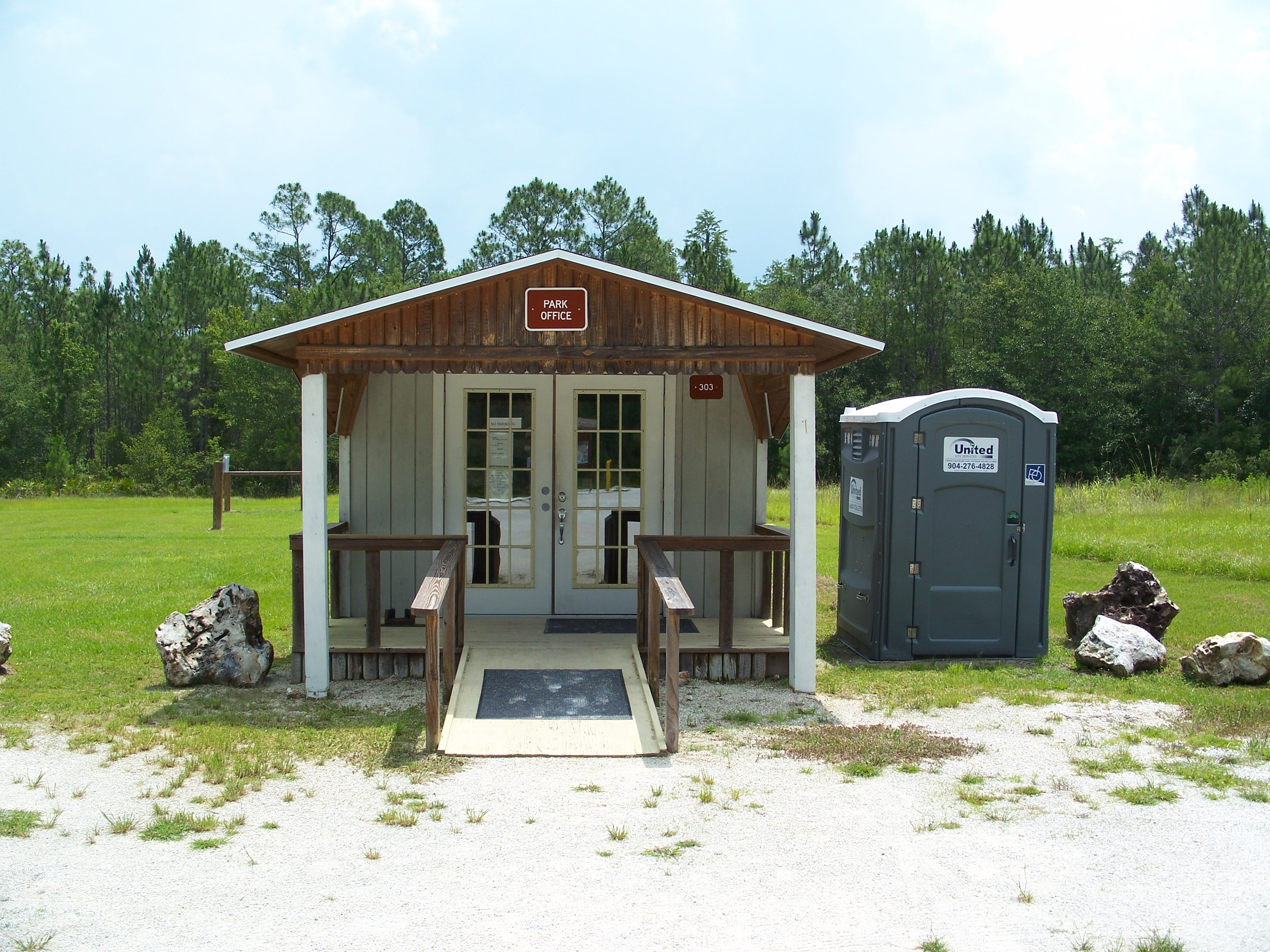
