= Odontolytes =

Scientific classification
- Kingdom: Animalia
- Phylum: Arthropoda
- Clade: Pancrustacea
- Class: Insecta
- Order: Coleoptera
- Suborder: Polyphaga
- Infraorder: Scarabaeiformia
- Family: Scarabaeidae
- Tribe: Eupariini
- Genus: Odontolytes; Koshantschikov, 1916

Synonyms
- Phalangochaeta Martínez, 1952

Genus of beetles

Odontolytes is a genus of aphodiine dung beetles in the family Scarabaeidae. There are about 19 described species in Odontolytes.

== Species ==
These 19 species belong to the genus Odontolytes:

- Odontolytes andamanensis Koshantschikov, 1916
- Odontolytes angusticollis (Schmidt, 1909)
- Odontolytes capitosus (Harold, 1867)
- Odontolytes denominatus (Chevrolat, 1864)
- Odontolytes domingo (Stebnicka, 2002)
- Odontolytes guayara (Stebnicka, 2002)
- Odontolytes huebneri (Petrovitz, 1970)
- Odontolytes iquitosae (Stebnicka, 2002)
- Odontolytes landai (Balthasar, 1963)
- Odontolytes loretoensis (Stebnicka, 2002)
- Odontolytes minutus (Petrovitz, 1973)
- Odontolytes panamensis (Stebnicka, 2002)
- Odontolytes puyoensis (Stebnicka, 2002)
- Odontolytes rondoniae (Stebnicka, 2002)
- Odontolytes tectipennis (Stebnicka & Skelley, 2005)
- Odontolytes teutoniae (Stebnicka, 2002)
- Odontolytes transversarius (Schmidt, 1909)
- Odontolytes viejoae (Stebnicka & Skelley, 2005)
- Odontolytes waoraniae (Stebnicka & Skelley, 2005)
