= Odontolytes andamanensis =

Scientific classification
- Kingdom: Animalia
- Phylum: Arthropoda
- Clade: Pancrustacea
- Class: Insecta
- Order: Coleoptera
- Suborder: Polyphaga
- Infraorder: Scarabaeiformia
- Family: Scarabaeidae
- Genus: Odontolytes
- Species: O. andamanensis

Binomial name
- Odontolytes andamanensis Koshantschikov, 1916

Synonyms
- Phalangochaeta amazonica Petrovitz, 1961

Species of beetle

Odontolytes andamanensis is a species of beetle in the family Scarabaeidae. It is found in the Brazilian state of Amazonas and in Peru.

== Description ==
Adults reach a length of about 3–3.5 mm (0.12–0.14 in). The body is piceous and the head is wide and punctate all over. The clypeus is subtruncate with an anterior glossy region with fine small tubercles. The pronotum is transverse, with the sides weakly explanate and the scutellum has a longitudinal carina. The elytra have convex and punctate interstriae.

== Taxonomy ==
It was described from the Andaman Islands (India), but most likely, these specimens were accidentally introduced from South America, or bear false locality data.

== Life history ==
Specimens have been collected in forest litter.
