= Odontolytes minutus =

Scientific classification
- Kingdom: Animalia
- Phylum: Arthropoda
- Clade: Pancrustacea
- Class: Insecta
- Order: Coleoptera
- Suborder: Polyphaga
- Infraorder: Scarabaeiformia
- Family: Scarabaeidae
- Genus: Odontolytes
- Species: O. minutus

Binomial name
- Odontolytes minutus (Petrovitz, 1973)

Synonyms
- Euparia minuta Petrovitz, 1973

Species of beetle

Odontolytes minutus is a species of beetle of the family Scarabaeidae. It is found in Brazil (Mato Grosso, Mato Grosso do Sul, Rondônia, São Paulo) and Venezuela.

== Description ==
Adults reach a length of about 3.8–4 mm (0.15–0.16 in). The body is elongate and reddish brown. The head is punctate, with the punctures elongate anteriorly to the frontoclypeal suture. The clypeus is sinuate. The pronotum is coarsely punctate, with the punctures larger and confluent near the lateral margins.

== Life history ==
Specimens have been collected in leaf litter in the Amazon rainforest, as well as in cerradão forest.
