= Green Swamp (Florida) =

Swamp in Florida

Coordinates: 28.20653°N 81.77393°W

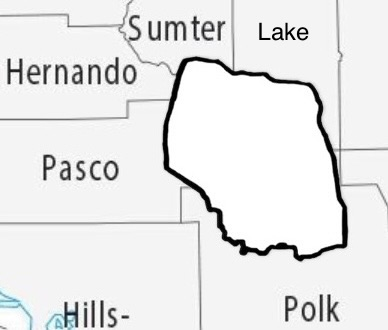
Green Swamp Formation Map

The Green Swamp is a relatively flat area in west-central Florida that hosts a mosaic of dry and wet habitats. It lies between the southern end of the Brooksville Ridge to the west and the middle of the Lake Wales Ridge to the east, and covers approximately 560,000 acres (230,000 ha) of parts of Hernando, Pasco, Sumter, Lake, Polk, and Hillsborough counties. The headwaters of the Peace River, Withlacoochee River, Ocklawaha River, and Hillsborough River are located here. The Green Swamp is also important as a recharge area for the Floridan Aquifer. A thin soil covers a limestone bedrock, and karst features are widespread in the area.

== History ==
While evidence of human use of the Green Swamp dates back to about 6000 BC, no evidence of permanent settlements in the area before the arrival of Europeans has been found. In the 20th century cattle ranching and lumbering grew in the Green Swamp. A logging railroad was built across the Green Swamp to haul the cut timber. In 1960 a heavy rainy season aggravated by Hurricane Donna caused wide-spread flooding in west-central Florida, leading to the creation of the Southwest Florida Water Management District as the agency to manage flood control. The U.S. Army Corps of Engineers developed the Four Rivers Basin project to reduce flooding by building dams and retention areas. Initial plans to build such structures in the Green Swamp met opposition, and it was decided to keep the Green Swamp in its natural condition for flood management. Following the opening of Walt Disney World just to the east of the Green Swamp in the early 1970s resulted in pressure to develop the Green Swamp. In response, the state of Florida designated 322,000 acres (130,000 ha) of the Green Swamp as an Area of Critical State Concern.

The last confirmed sighting of an ivory-billed woodpecker in Florida was in the Green Swamp in 1967, and the species may have persisted in the swamp until 1969. A secondary wing feather recovered from a nesting hole was identified as being that of an ivory-billed woodpecker by ornithologist Alexander Wetmore.

In 1974, a Taiwanese seaman named Hu Tu-Mei was to be sent home after his ship docked in Tampa. After he refused to board a flight to Taiwan, he was admitted to the security ward at Tampa General Hospital, but escaped from there shortly afterward and disappeared without a trace. Hu spent eight months in the Green Swamp, eating items stolen from barns and other buildings. The "Wild Man of the Green Swamp" was captured by sheriff's deputies in Sumter County, Florida after surviving on his own for eight months. First sighted in September, he had survived on raw armadillos, fruit, and food stolen from buildings. Hu Tu-Mei hanged himself in jail two days later.

== Natural communities ==
Natural communities in the Green Swamp include xeric hammocks, pine sandhills, oak scrubs, wet prairies, marshes, pine flatwoods, cypress domes, bottomland forests, hydric hammocks, bayheads, and riverine swamps. Neighboring cypress domes in the Green Swamp often coalesce into cypress strands during periods of high water level. The major swamp communities in the Green Swamp are cypress domes and blackwater river swamps of cypress and mixed hardwoods. Blackwater river swamps occur primarily along the Withlacoochee and Hillsborough rivers, where they may be up to 1 mile (1.6 km) wide. Devils Creek Swamp in Sumter County is a blackwater swamp that covers 6,305 acres (2,552 ha).

== Protected areas ==
Some 110,000 acres (45,000 ha) of the swamp are managed as the Green Swamp Wilderness Preserve by the Southwest Florida Water Management District. Divided into five management units: Colt Creek State Park — 5,067 acres (2,051 ha); East Tract — 51,149 acres (20,699 ha); Hampton Tract — 11,052 acres (4,473 ha); Little Withlacoochee Tract — 4,446 acres (1,799 ha); and West Tract — 37,350 acres (15,120 ha). Nearly 36 miles (58 km) of the Withlacoochee River’s 110-mile (180 km) length are protected as an Outstanding Florida Water within the Green Swamp Wilderness Preserve. The Green Swamp Wildlife Management Area includes 50,692 acres (20,514 ha) in the eastern part of area. The Lower Green Swamp Nature Preserve includes 12,800 acres (5,200 ha) in northeastern Hillsborough County. The General James A. Van Fleet State Trail runs for 29.2 miles (47.0 km) through the Green Swamp. More than 58,000 acres (23,000 ha) of the western Green Swamp is in the Richloam Wildlife Management Area, part of the Withlacoochee State Forest co-managed by the Florida Fish and Wildlife Conservation Commission. The Osprey Unit of the Hilochee Wildlife Management Area is in the eastern part of the Green Swamp Area of Critical State Concern.

== Geology ==
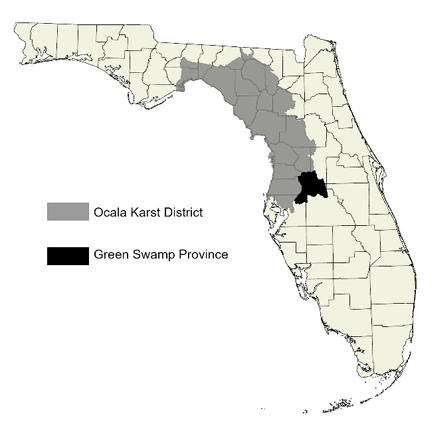
Location of Green Swamp geomorphological province in Florida

The Green Swamp is designated as a geomorphological province by the Florida Geological Survey. The province includes southeastern Hernando, eastern Pasco, southern Sumter, southwestern Lake, northern Polk, and northeastern Hillsborough counties. It lies between the southern end of the Brooksville Ridge and the middle of the Lake Wales Ridge Complex. It borders the Tsala Apopka Plain to the north, the Land O'Lakes Karst Plain to the southwest, and the Hardee Upland to the south. The province has some features of a karst landscape, but the features are not as strongly developed as in some neighboring geomorphological provinces. The province is flat with cypress swamps and pine flatwoods. Low ridges occur in the eastern part of the province close to the foot of the Lake Wales Ridge Complex. Scattered dunes occur elsewhere in the province. There are nearly-circular cypress swamps throughout the province in shallow sinkholes surrounded by pine flatwoods. One prominent karst feature is Dobes Hole on the Withlacoochee River. It acts as a swallet when the river is high, diverting some of the river flow underground, and as a spring when the water table is high, adding to the river's flow. There are also some siphons in the Withlacoochee River in places where the bottom of the river channel is exposed bedrock (part of the river's flow enters an underground channel that later rejoins the river).

== Hydrology ==
The Green Swamp's 560,000 acres (230,000 ha) of wetlands, flatlands and low ridges are bounded by prominent sandy ridgelines. Rainwater drains across the surface to create the headwaters of four major rivers: the Withlacoochee, the Ocklawaha, the Hillsborough and the Peace. Rainwater also percolates down through the soil to replenish the Floridan aquifer system, the primary source of drinking water for most Floridians. Because the Green Swamp region is elevated above outlying areas and the underground aquifer rises very close to the land surface, the region functions as the pressure head for the aquifer. Protecting the Green Swamp is vital to protecting the quality and quantity of Florida’s water supply. Recognizing the statewide significance of this area, the state of Florida in 1974 designated 322,000 acres (130,000 ha) of the Green Swamp region as an Area of Critical State Concern. Most of the water (78%) that falls on the Green Swamp returns to the atmosphere by evapotranspiration, 15% runs off in rivers, and 8% moves into the aquifer. A study simulating the effects of drainage of wetlands found that if 80% of the swamps in the Green Swamp area were drained and replaced with plant communities with higher evapotranspiration and lower flood retention capability, the water entering the surface aquifer would be reduced by 45%, proportionally reducing the water available from the aquifer to surrounding communities.

== Recreation ==
The Green Swamp is a popular destination for birding, hiking, trail running, bicycling, equestrian, fishing, canoeing, kayaking, and hunting. It is also popular among trail runners with the Skunk Ape Night Run and the Skunk Ape's Revenge that take place every year. Dances With Dirt used to be a popular race that once was held in the Green Swamp.

== Sources ==
- Larson, Ron (1995). Swamp Song: A Natural History of Florida's Swamps. Gainesville, Florida: University Press of Florida. ISBN 9780813013558.
- Ewel, Katherine C. (1990). "Swamps". In Myers, Ronald L.; Ewel, John J. (eds.). Ecosystems of Florida. Orlando, Florida: University of Central Florida Press. pp. 282–323. ISBN 9780813010229.
