= Odontolytes panamensis =

Scientific classification
- Kingdom: Animalia
- Phylum: Arthropoda
- Clade: Pancrustacea
- Class: Insecta
- Order: Coleoptera
- Suborder: Polyphaga
- Infraorder: Scarabaeiformia
- Family: Scarabaeidae
- Genus: Odontolytes
- Species: O. panamensis

Binomial name
- Odontolytes panamensis (Stebnicka, 2002)

Synonyms
- Auperia panamensis Stebnicka, 2002

Species of beetle

Odontolytes panamensis is a species of beetle of the family Scarabaeidae. It is found in Panama.

== Description ==
Adults reach a length of about 6.5–7 mm (0.26–0.28 in). They have an elongate-oblong, convex, shining, reddish black body.
