= Odontolytes loretoensis =

Scientific classification
- Kingdom: Animalia
- Phylum: Arthropoda
- Clade: Pancrustacea
- Class: Insecta
- Order: Coleoptera
- Suborder: Polyphaga
- Infraorder: Scarabaeiformia
- Family: Scarabaeidae
- Genus: Odontolytes
- Species: O. loretoensis

Binomial name
- Odontolytes loretoensis (Stebnicka, 2002)

Synonyms
- Auperia loretoensis Stebnicka, 2002

Species of beetle

Odontolytes loretoensis is a species of beetle of the family Scarabaeidae. It is found in Brazil (Pará), French Guiana and Peru.

== Description ==
Adults reach a length of about 3.8–4 mm (0.15–0.16 in). The body is reddish brown and the head is coarsely punctate, with the punctures somewhat oval near the frontoclypeal suture. The clypeus is sinuate. The pronotum has punctures of two sizes, with the fine punctures inconspicuous among the coarse punctures. The coarse punctures are larger and confluent laterally.
