= Odontolytes guayara =

Scientific classification
- Kingdom: Animalia
- Phylum: Arthropoda
- Clade: Pancrustacea
- Class: Insecta
- Order: Coleoptera
- Suborder: Polyphaga
- Infraorder: Scarabaeiformia
- Family: Scarabaeidae
- Genus: Odontolytes
- Species: O. guayara

Binomial name
- Odontolytes guayara (Stebnicka, 2002)

Synonyms
- Auperia guayara Stebnicka, 2002

Species of beetle

Odontolytes guayara is a species of beetle of the family Scarabaeidae. It is found in Bolivia, Brazil (Acre, Amazonas) and French Guiana.

== Description ==
Adults reach a length of about 4.2–5 mm (0.17–0.20 in). The body is oblong and reddish brown. The head is coarsely punctate and the clypeus is sinuate, laterally with faint wrinkles. The pronotum has mixed fine and coarse punctures. The interstriae on the elytra are convex and crenulated by coarse punctures.
