= Odontolytes iquitosae =

Scientific classification
- Kingdom: Animalia
- Phylum: Arthropoda
- Clade: Pancrustacea
- Class: Insecta
- Order: Coleoptera
- Suborder: Polyphaga
- Infraorder: Scarabaeiformia
- Family: Scarabaeidae
- Genus: Odontolytes
- Species: O. iquitosae

Binomial name
- Odontolytes iquitosae (Stebnicka, 2002)

Synonyms
- Auperia iquitosae Stebnicka, 2002

Species of beetle

Odontolytes iquitosae is a species of beetle of the family Scarabaeidae. It is found in Bolivia, Brazil (Espírito Santo, Minas Gerais, Rondônia), Ecuador, French Guiana, Panama and Peru.

== Description ==
Adults reach a length of about 4–5 mm (0.16–0.20 in). The body is oval, robust and piceous. The head is densely punctate with fine punctures and the clypeus is sinuate. The pronotum has moderate sized punctures, separated by their diameter.

== Life history ==
Specimens have been collected in forest litter near Ficus fruits.
