= Odontolytes landai =

Scientific classification
- Kingdom: Animalia
- Phylum: Arthropoda
- Clade: Pancrustacea
- Class: Insecta
- Order: Coleoptera
- Suborder: Polyphaga
- Infraorder: Scarabaeiformia
- Family: Scarabaeidae
- Genus: Odontolytes
- Species: O. landai

Binomial name
- Odontolytes landai (Balthasar, 1963)

Synonyms
- Odontolochus (Odontolytes) landai Balthasar, 1963; Phalangochaeta squamosa Petrovitz, 1976

Species of beetle

Odontolytes landai is a species of beetle of the family Scarabaeidae. It is found in Bolivia, Colombia, Ecuador, Guatemala, Honduras, Mexico (Chiapas, Oaxaca, Veracruz), Panama, Paraguay, Trinidad & Tobago and Venezuela.

== Description ==
Adults reach a length of about 4–4.5 mm (0.16–0.18 in). They have an oblong-oval, shining, piceous black body.

== Life history ==
Specimens have been collected in e wet montane forest litter, coffee forest litter, decaying Ficus fruits, in moss, as well as in destroyed termite nests.
