= Odontolytes viejoae =

Scientific classification
- Kingdom: Animalia
- Phylum: Arthropoda
- Clade: Pancrustacea
- Class: Insecta
- Order: Coleoptera
- Suborder: Polyphaga
- Infraorder: Scarabaeiformia
- Family: Scarabaeidae
- Genus: Odontolytes
- Species: O. viejoae

Binomial name
- Odontolytes viejoae (Stebnicka & Skelley, 2005)

Synonyms
- Auperia viejoae Stebnicka & Skelley, 2005

Species of beetle

Odontolytes viejoae is a species of beetle of the family Scarabaeidae. It is found in Costa Rica.

== Description ==
Adults reach a length of about 3.5 mm (0.14 in). They have an oblong-oval, strongly convex, shiny dark brown body.

== Etymology ==
The species is named after its type locality, Puerto Viejo.
