= Lower Green Swamp Preserve =

Nature preserve, United States of America

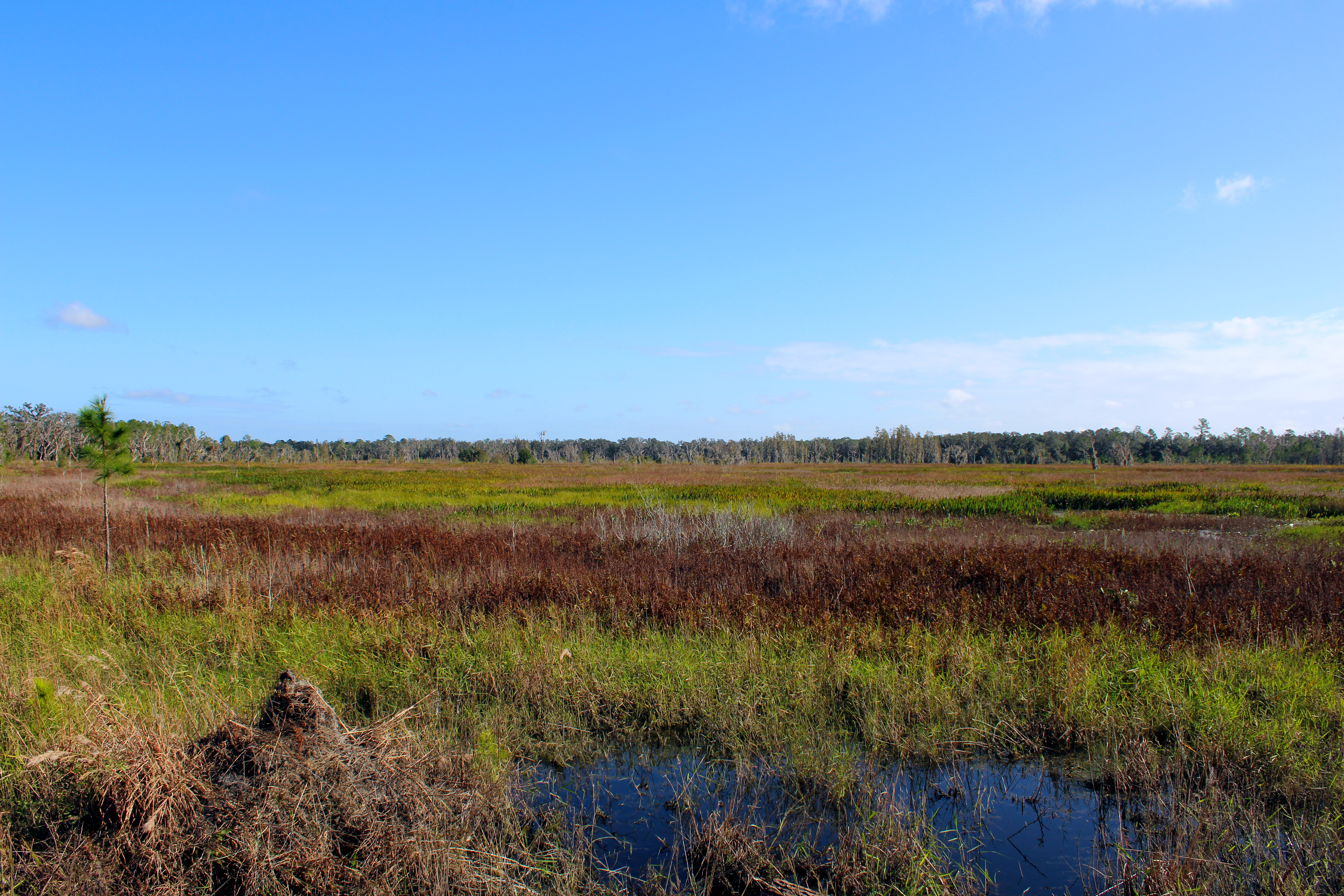
- An opening at Lower Green Swamp Preserve.

- Location within Florida
- Location: 3540 East Knights Griffin Road, Plant City, FL 33565
- Coordinates: 28.097972°N 82.087778°W
- Area: 12,800 acres (5,200 ha)
- Opened: January 2014
- Operator: Hillsborough County's Conservation and Environmental Lands Management Department
- Website: https://www.hillsboroughcounty.org/en/locations/lower-green-swamp-nature-preserve

Lower Green Swamp Preserve, formerly the Cone Ranch, is a 12,800 acres (5,200 ha) nature preserve northeastern Hillsborough County, Florida near Plant City. Hikers and equestrians enjoy almost 20 miles (32 km) of sunny, open hiking and equestrian trails winding through the southern portion of the preserve.

== Facilities ==
This land is kept in a primitive state for the benefit of the native plants and wildlife. There is no running water but a portable toilet is located across the trail from the office, near the southernmost bridge. Bicyclists are not permitted and there is no camping or hunting allowed on the preserve.

== History ==
The preserve includes former cattle ranchland and farmlands that are now being restored to a more natural state. Canals built for flood relief were blocked, and efforts continue to restore the natural hydrology of the preserve. The property was purchased by the West Coast Regional Water Supply Authority in 1988 for groundwater pumping, a plan that was later blocked by changes in federal rules. A proposed sports complex plan in the 2000s met with public criticism and proposals to turn the land into private hunting camps were also defeated. The property was eventually sold to Florida's Jan K. Platt Environmental Lands Acquisition and Protection Program in 2010. In January 2014, a portion of the land was opened for public use, and the preserve became a popular destination for hiking, horseback riding, and wildlife viewing. On September 17, 2022 one of the hiking trails was dedicated to W. Kent Bailey, one of the main activists responsible for the purchase of the land by ELAPP. More land is being removed from the cattle lease, which will allow the continuation of the size of the restored area.

== Flora and fauna ==
Species in the area include white-tailed deer, Sherman's fox squirrels, bald eagles, Southern fox squirrels, wood storks, and barred owls. Staff maintain trails and the parking area, performing prescribed fire to benefit native plants and wildlife, monitoring wildlife, and removing invasive plants such as natal grass and Chinese tallow tree.

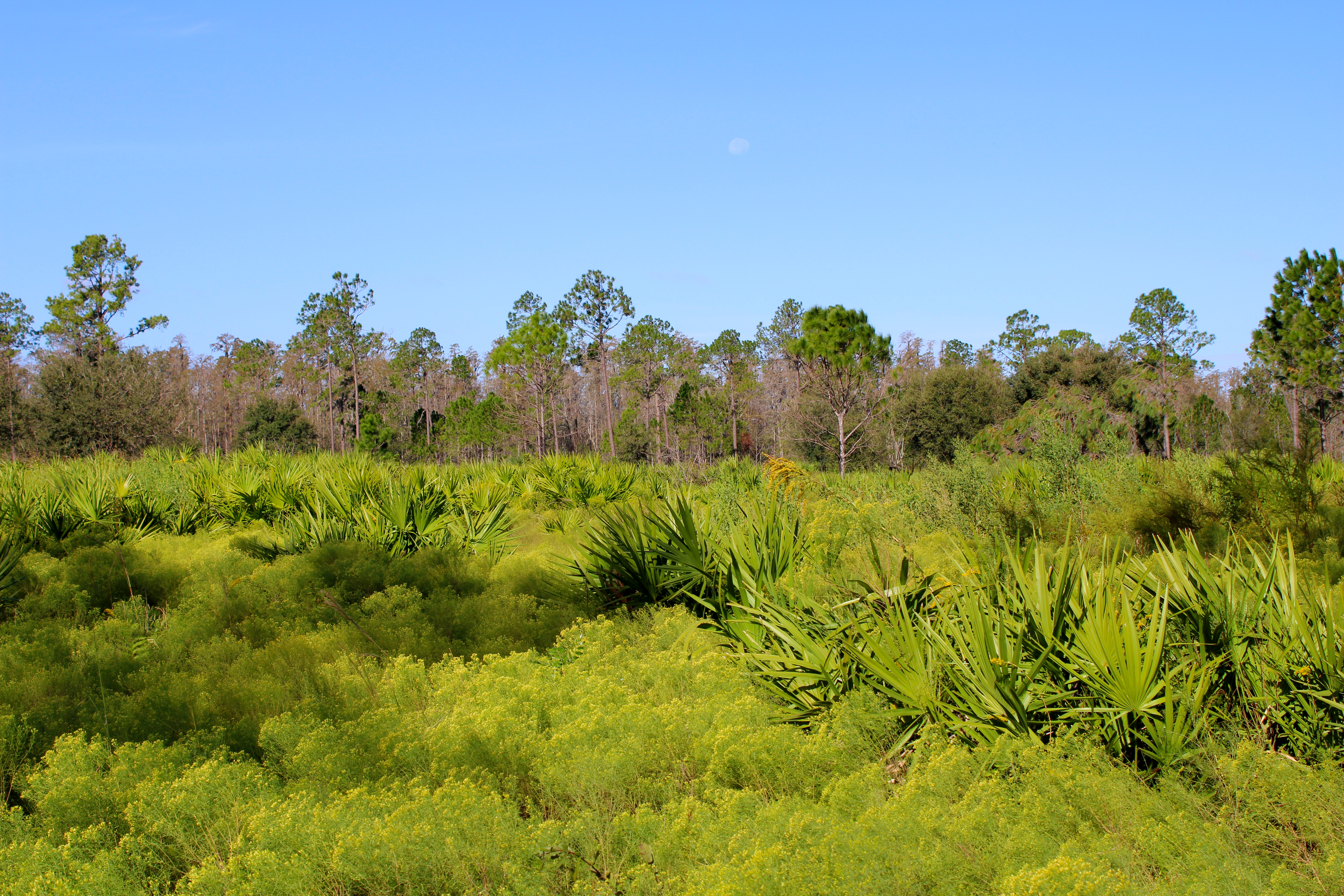
Various plants found at Lower Green Swamp Preserve.

== See also ==
Green Swamp Wilderness Preserve
