= Odontolytes huebneri =

Scientific classification
- Kingdom: Animalia
- Phylum: Arthropoda
- Clade: Pancrustacea
- Class: Insecta
- Order: Coleoptera
- Suborder: Polyphaga
- Infraorder: Scarabaeiformia
- Family: Scarabaeidae
- Genus: Odontolytes
- Species: O. huebneri

Binomial name
- Odontolytes huebneri (Petrovitz, 1970)

Synonyms
- Euparia huebneri Petrovitz, 1970

Species of beetle

Odontolytes huebneri is a species of beetle of the family Scarabaeidae. It is found in Bolivia, Brazil (Acre, Amazonas, Rondônia), Colombia, Peru and Trinidad & Tobago.

== Description ==
Adults reach a length of about 4.8–5 mm (0.19–0.20 in). The body is piceous. The head has dense and coarse punctures. The pronotal surface is densely and coarsely punctured, with the punctures larger and closer near the lateral margins. The elytra have deep and wide striae and the interstriae are convex and shagreened.

== Life history ==
Specimens have been collected in meadows.
