= Odontolytes transversarius =

Scientific classification
- Kingdom: Animalia
- Phylum: Arthropoda
- Clade: Pancrustacea
- Class: Insecta
- Order: Coleoptera
- Suborder: Polyphaga
- Infraorder: Scarabaeiformia
- Family: Scarabaeidae
- Genus: Odontolytes
- Species: O. transversarius

Binomial name
- Odontolytes transversarius (Schmidt, 1909)

Synonyms
- Ataenius transversarius Schmidt, 1909; Euparia bolivari Petrovitz, 1973

Species of beetle

Odontolytes transversarius is a species of beetle of the family Scarabaeidae. It is found in Bolivia, Brazil (Acre, Mato Grosso, Minas Gerais, Pará, Rondônia, São Paulo), Colombia, Ecuador and Peru.

== Description ==
Adults reach a length of about 4.8–5.2 mm (0.19–0.20 in). The body is piceous and the head is densely covered with coarse punctures. The clypeus is sinuate, with a glossy band just before the anterior margin. The pronotum is covered with coarse punctures, with the punctures larger and closer near the lateral margins. The elytra have deep striae and the interstriae are flat.

== Life history ==
Specimens have been collected in Pinus caribbea hondurensis stands and tropical rainforests.
