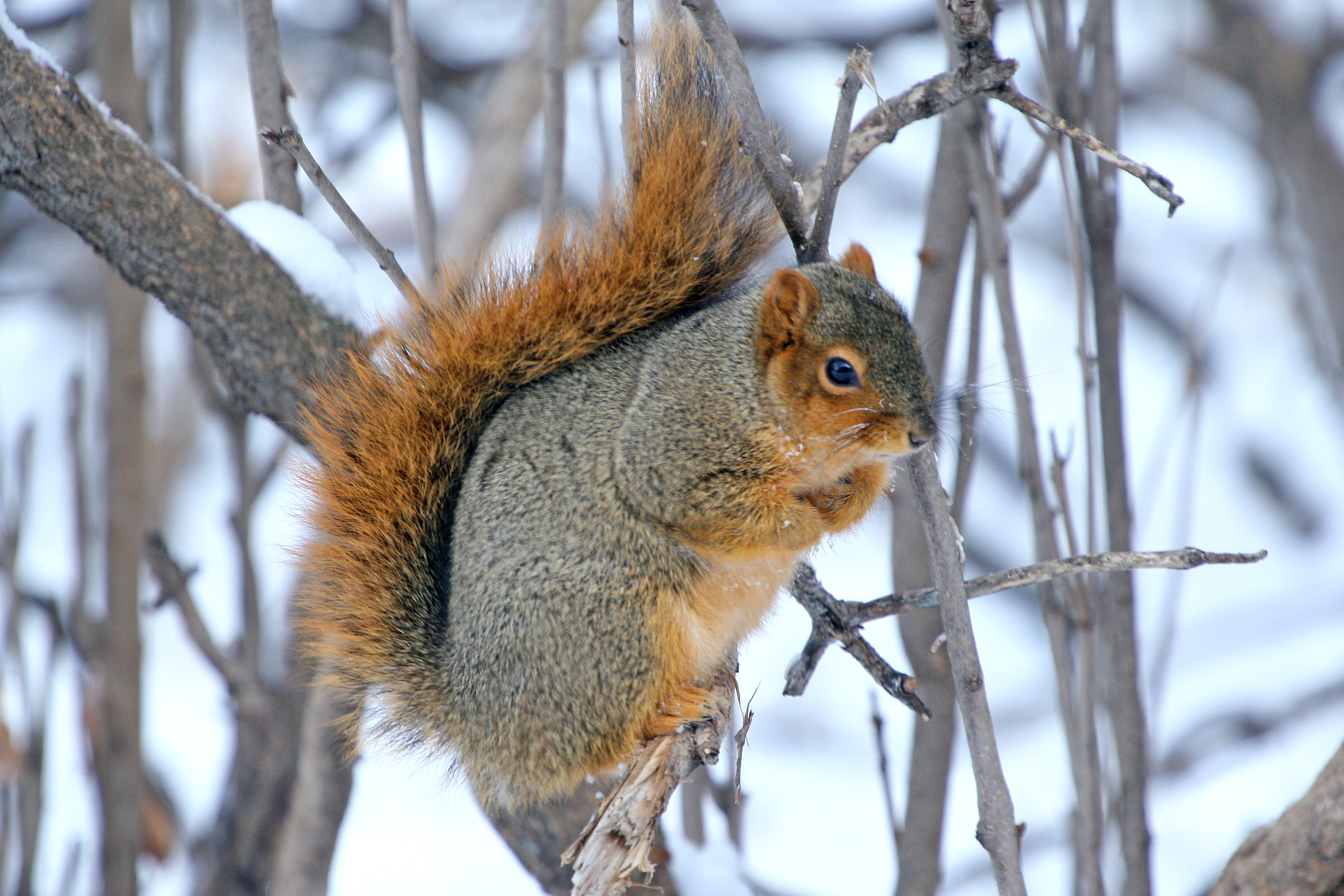
- Fox squirrel in J. Clark Salyer National Wildlife Refuge, North Dakota

Conservation status
- Least Concern (IUCN 3.1)

- Secure (NatureServe)

Scientific classification
- Kingdom: Animalia
- Phylum: Chordata
- Class: Mammalia
- Order: Rodentia
- Family: Sciuridae
- Genus: Sciurus
- Subgenus: Sciurus
- Species: S. niger

Binomial name
- Sciurus niger Linnaeus, 1758

Subspecies
- S. n. niger – Southern fox squirrel; S. n. avicinnia – mangrove fox squirrel or Big Cypress fox squirrel; S. n. bachmani – upland fox Squirrel; S. n. cinereus – Delmarva Peninsula fox squirrel; S. n. limitis – Texas fox squirrel; S. n. ludovicianus – pineywoods fox squirrel; S. n. rufiventer– western fox squirrel or Say's fox squirrel; S. n. shermani – Sherman's fox squirrel; S. n. subauratus – delta fox squirrel; S. n. vulpinus – eastern fox squirrel
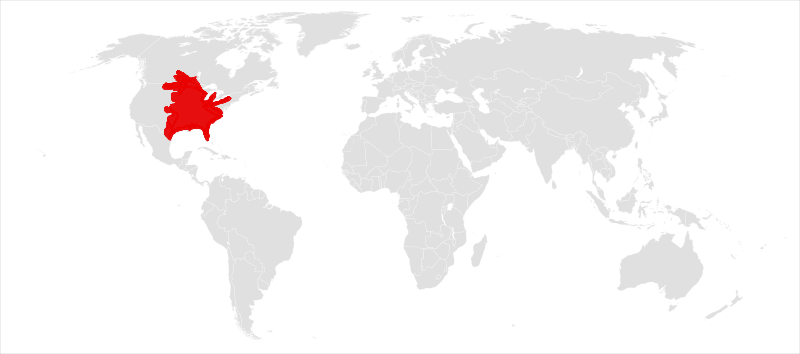
- Fox squirrel's range (excludes introduced populations)

= Fox squirrel =

Fox squirrel Temporal range: Middle Holocene–present (7,000–0 YBP)

Species of mammal

The fox squirrel (Sciurus niger), also known as the eastern fox squirrel or Bryant's fox squirrel, is the largest species of tree squirrel native to North America. It is sometimes mistaken for the American red squirrel or eastern gray squirrel in areas where the species coexist, though they differ in size and coloration. The word Sciurus came from the ancient Greek words skia, meaning shade, and oura, meaning tail. Niger refers to the black coloration.

== Description ==
The fox squirrel's total length measures 20 to 30 in (50.8 to 76.2 cm), with a body length of 10 to 15 in (25.4 to 38.1 cm) and a similar tail length. They range in weight from 1.0 to 2.5 lb (453.6 to 1,134.0 g).The length of its hind foot is 5.1 to 8.2 cm. There is no sexual dimorphism in size or appearance. Individuals tend to be smaller in the West. There are three distinct geographical morphs in coloration. In most areas, the animal's upper body is brown-grey to brown-yellow with a typically brownish-orange underside, while in eastern regions, such as the Appalachians, there are more strikingly-patterned dark brown and black squirrels with white bands on the face and tail. In the South and parts of Nebraska and Iowa along the Missouri River, there are populations with uniform black coats.

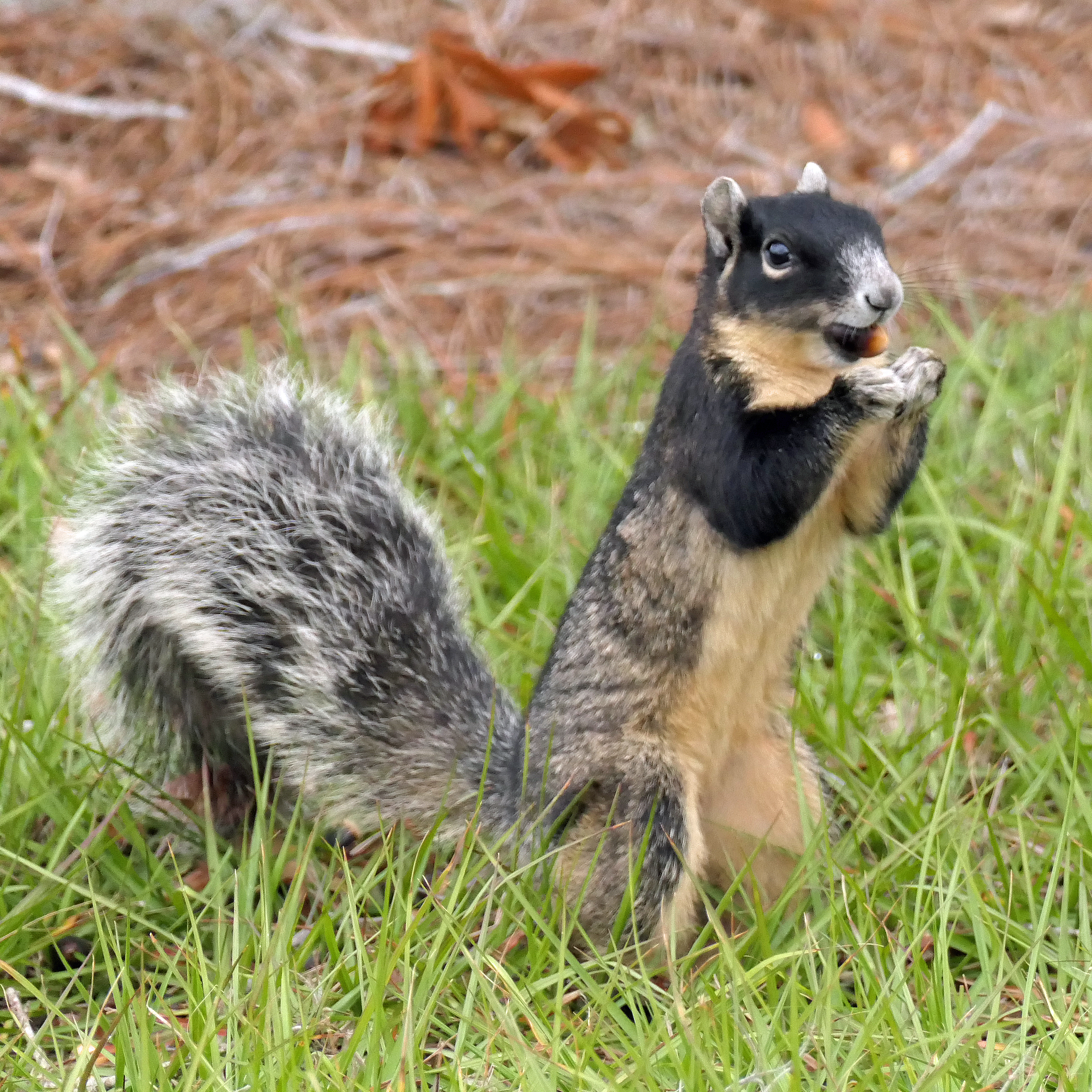
Black morph (S. n. shermani) from central Florida

To help with climbing, the squirrels have sharp claws, developed extensors of digits and flexors of forearms, and abdominal musculature. Fox squirrels have excellent vision and well-developed senses of hearing and smell. They use scent-marking to communicate with other fox squirrels. "Fox squirrels also have several sets of vibrissae, hairs or whiskers that are used as touch receptors to sense the environment. These are found above and below their eyes, on their chin and nose, and on each forearm." The dental formula of S. niger is 1.0.1.31.0.1.3 × 2 = 20.

== Distribution and habitat ==
The fox squirrel's natural range extends through most of the eastern United States, north into the southern prairie provinces of Canada, west to the Dakotas, Colorado, and Texas, and south to the northern parts of Coahuila, Nuevo León (as far south as the Valle de las Salinas) and Tamaulipas. It is absent (except for vagrants) in New England, New Jersey, most of New York, northern and eastern Pennsylvania, Ontario, Quebec, and the Atlantic provinces of Canada. It has been introduced to both northern and southern California, Oregon, Idaho, Montana, Washington, New Mexico, and Utah,, as well as Ontario and British Columbia in Canada. While very versatile in their habitat choices, fox squirrels are most often found in forest patches of 40 hectares or less with an open understory, or in urban neighborhoods with trees. They thrive among oak, hickory, walnut, pecan and pine trees, storing their nuts for winter. Western range extensions in Great Plains regions such as Kansas are associated with riverine corridors of cottonwood. Some subspecies native to several eastern U.S. states are the Delmarva Peninsula fox squirrel (S. n. cinereus), and the southern fox squirrel (S. n. niger).

Fox squirrels are most abundant in open forest stands with little understory vegetation; they are not found in stands with dense undergrowth. Ideal habitat is small stands of large trees interspersed with agricultural land. The size and spacing of pines and oaks are among the important features of fox squirrel habitat. The actual species of pines and oaks themselves may not always be a major consideration in defining fox squirrel habitat. Fox squirrels are often observed foraging on the ground several hundred meters from the nearest woodlot. Fox squirrels also commonly occupy forest edge habitat.

Fox squirrels have two types of shelters: leaf nests (dreys) and tree dens. They may have two tree cavity homes or a tree cavity and a leaf nest. Tree dens are preferred over leaf nests during the winter and for raising young. When den trees are scarce, leaf nests are used year-round. Leaf nests are built during the summer months in forks of deciduous trees about 30 feet (9 m) above the ground. Fox squirrels use natural cavities and crotches (forked branches of a tree) as tree dens. Den trees in Ohio had an average diameter at breast height (d.b.h.) of 21 inches (53 cm) and were an average of 58.6 yards (53.6 m) from the nearest woodland border. About 88% of den trees in eastern Texas had an average d.b.h. (diameter at breast height) of 12 inches (30 cm) or more. Dens are usually 6 inches (15 cm) wide and 14–16 inches (36–41 cm) inches deep. Den openings are generally circular and about 2.9 to 3.7 inches (7.4 to 9.4 cm). Fox squirrels may make their own den in a hollow tree by cutting through the interior; however, they generally use natural cavities or cavities created by northern flickers (Colaptes auratus) or red-headed woodpeckers (Melanerpes erythrocephalus). Crow nests have also been used by fox squirrels.

Fox squirrels use leaf nests or tree cavities for shelter and litter rearing. Forest stands dominated by mature to over-mature trees provide cavities and a sufficient number of sites for leaf nests to meet the cover requirements. Overstory trees with an average d.b.h. of 15 inches (38 cm) or more generally provide adequate cover and reproductive habitat. Optimum tree canopy closure for fox squirrels is from 20% to 60%. Optimum conditions of understory closure occur when the shrub-crown closure is 30% or less.

Fox squirrels are tolerant of human proximity, and even thrive in crowded urban and suburban environments. They exploit human habitations for sources of food and nesting sites, being as happy nesting in an attic as they are in a hollow tree.

=== As an invasive species ===
In Europe, S. niger has been included since 2016 in the list of Invasive Alien Species of Union concern (the Union list). This implies that this species cannot be imported, bred, transported, commercialized, or intentionally released into the environment in the whole of the European Union.

=== Introduced range ===
Eastern fox squirrels have been intentionally introduced from portions of their native range to many urban and suburban areas within the western United States, including areas within California, Utah, Idaho, Montana, Oregon, and Washington. For example, eastern fox squirrels were introduced in California to the city of Fresno from Missouri in 1900 or 1901, to the Veterans Hospital in West Los Angeles in 1904 from some region of the Mississippi Valley, to the area around the San Diego Zoo in 1920, to the campus of the University of California, Berkeley circa 1926, to Mount Diablo in Clayton in 1960, and to Bakersfield from Fresno in 1985.

In the 1940s, fox squirrels originally from Missouri were released at Similkameen River's confluence with the Okanagan River in Washington, and were afterwards recorded to have dispersed south along the Okanagan's course. This release later led to a belief that the eastern gray squirrel, which is not native to the region, had been artificially introduced in the Okanagan and Puget Sound regions. Other fox squirrel populations exist in Orcas Island, Wahkiakum County, and Adams County, suggesting continued illegal releases.

== Behavior and ecology ==
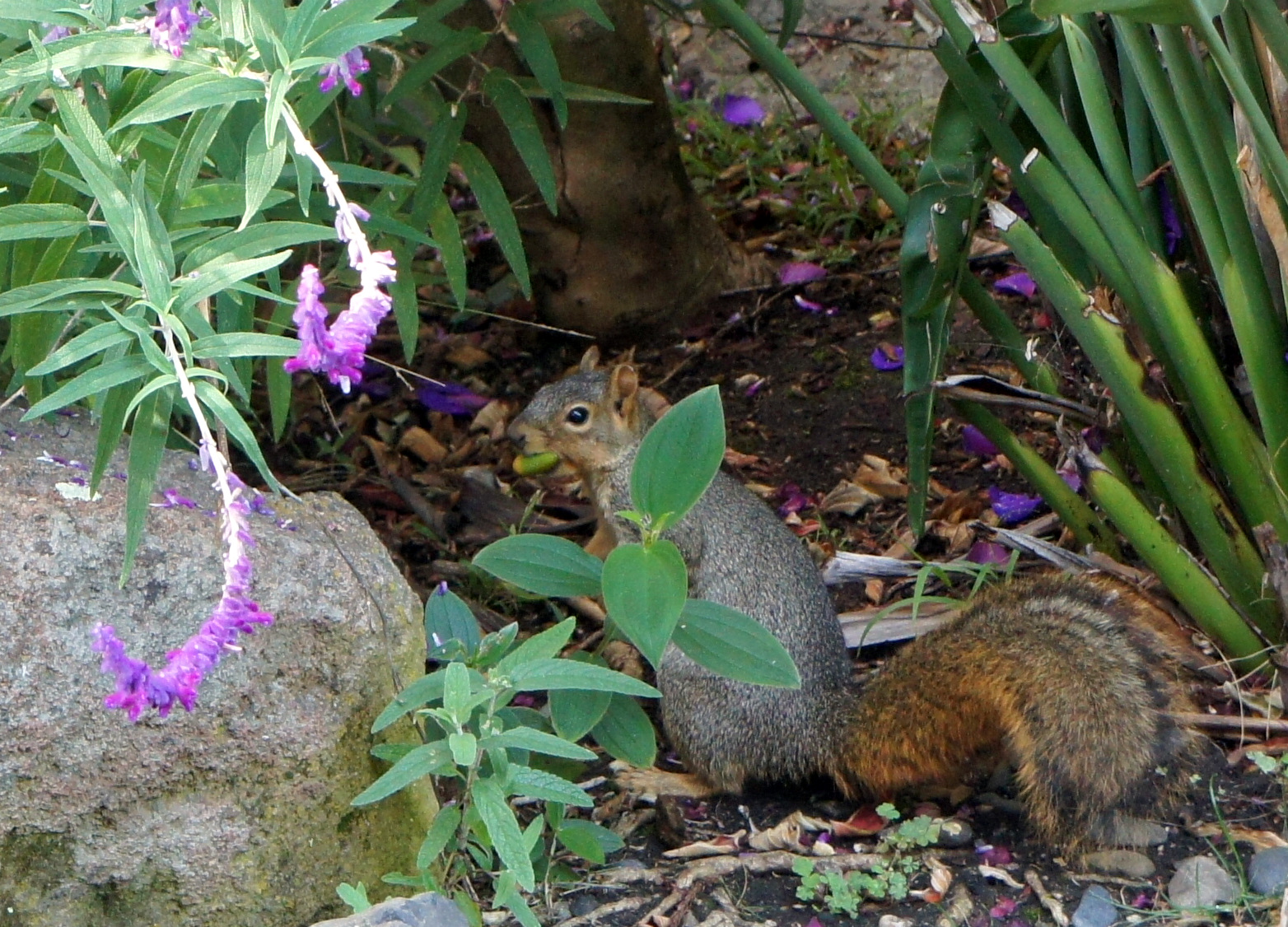
A backyard fox squirrel searching for a location to bury its acorn, in Berkeley, California

Manipulation of food items by the paws and head

Fox squirrels are strictly diurnal, non-territorial, and spend more of their time on the ground than most other tree squirrels. They are still, however, agile climbers. They construct two types of homes called "dreys", depending on the season. Summer dreys are often little more than platforms of sticks high in the branches of trees, while winter dens are usually hollowed out of tree trunks by a succession of occupants over as many as 30 years. Cohabitation of these dens is not uncommon, particularly among breeding pairs.

Fox squirrels will form caches by burying food items for later consumption. They like to store foods that are shelled and high in fat, such as acorns and nuts. Shelled foods are favored because they are less likely to spoil than non-shelled foods, and fatty foods are valued for their high energy density.

Fox squirrels are not particularly gregarious or playful; in fact, they have been described as solitary and asocial creatures, coming together only in breeding season. They have a large vocabulary, consisting most notably of an assortment of clucking and chucking sounds, not unlike some "game" birds, and they warn of approaching threats with distress screams. In the spring and autumn, groups of fox squirrels clucking and chucking together can make a small ruckus. They also make high-pitched whines during mating. When threatening another fox squirrel, they will stand upright with their tail over their back and flick it. Fox squirrels are impressive jumpers, easily spanning 15 feet in horizontal leaps and free-falling 20 feet or more to a soft landing on a tree limb or tree trunk.

=== Diet ===
Food habits of fox squirrels depend largely on geographic location. In general, fox squirrel foods include mast, tree buds, insects, tubers, bulbs, roots, bird eggs, pine nuts and spring-fruiting trees, and fungi. Agricultural crops such as corn, soybeans, oats, wheat, and fruit are also eaten. Mast eaten by fox squirrels commonly includes turkey oak (Quercus laevis), southern red oak (Quercus falcata), blackjack oak (Quercus marilandica), bluejack oak (Quercus incana), post oak (Quercus stellata), and live oak (Quercus virginiana).

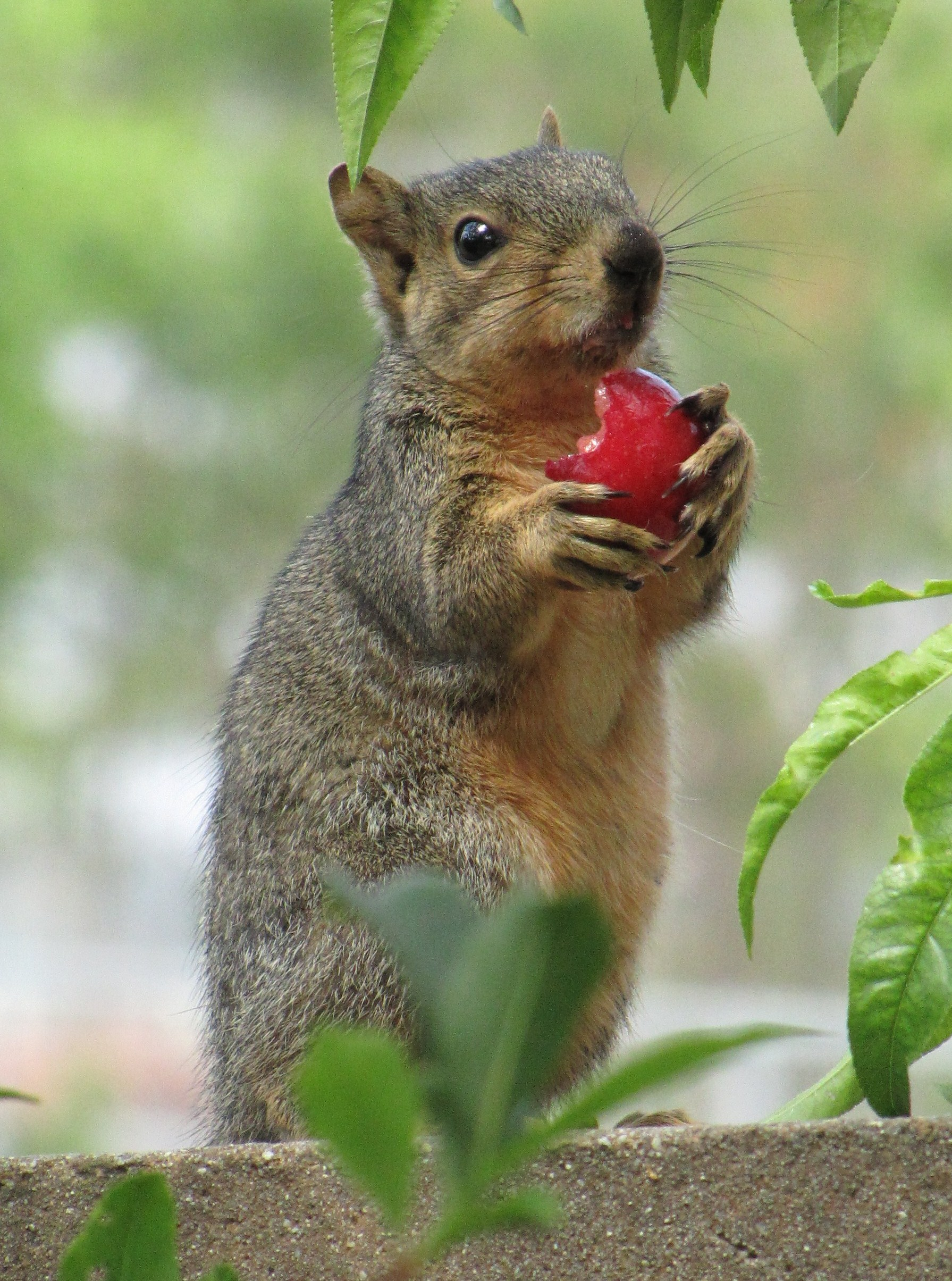
A fox squirrel eating a Santa Rosa plum in Fullerton, California

In Illinois, fox squirrels rely heavily on hickories from late August through September. Pecans, black walnuts (Juglans nigra), osage orange (Maclura pomifera) fruits, and corn are also important fall foods. In early spring, elm buds and seeds are the most important food. In May and June, mulberries (Morus spp.) are heavily used. By early summer, corn in the milk stage becomes a primary food.

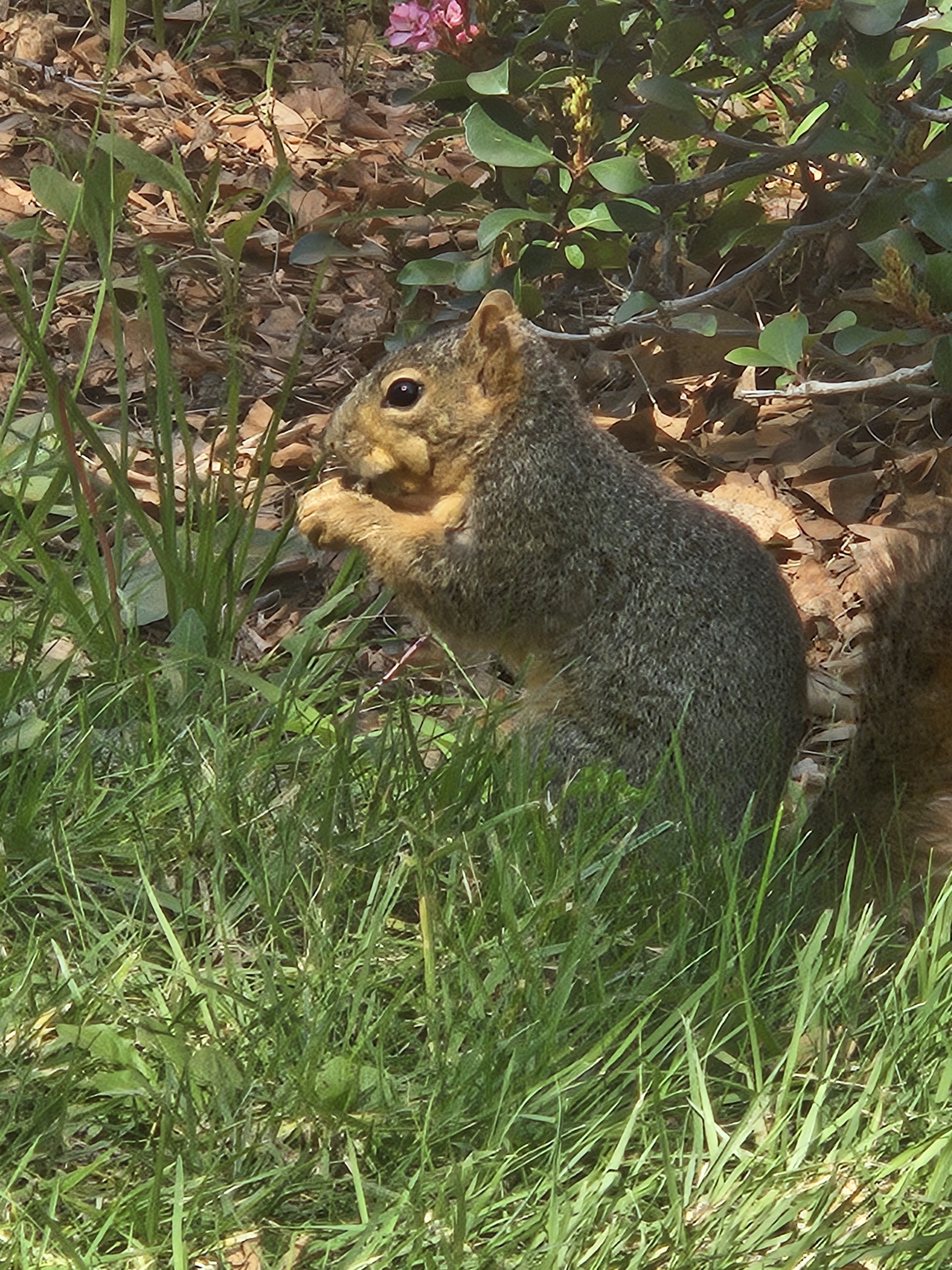
A Fox squirrel storing food in its mouth in Los Angeles, California

During the winter in Kansas, osage orange is a staple item supplemented with seeds of the Kentucky coffee tree (Gymnocladus dioicus) and honey locust (Gleditsia triacanthos), corn, wheat, eastern cottonwood (Populus deltoides var. deltoides) bark, ash seeds, and eastern red cedar (Juniperus virginiana) berries. In the spring, fox squirrels feed primarily on buds of elm, maple, and oaks but also on newly sprouting leaves and insect larvae.

Fox squirrels in Ohio prefer hickory nuts, acorns, corn, and black walnuts. The squirrels are absent where two or more of these mast trees are missing. Fox squirrels also eat buckeyes, seeds and buds of maple and elm, hazelnuts (Corylus spp.), blackberries (Rubus spp.), and tree bark. In March, they feed mainly on buds and seeds of elm, maple, and willow. In Ohio, eastern fox squirrels have the following order of food preference: white oak (Quercus alba) acorns, black oak (Quercus velutina) acorns, red oak (Quercus rubra) acorns, walnuts, and corn.

In eastern Texas, fox squirrels prefer the acorns of bluejack oak, pecans, southern red oak (Q. falcata), and overcup oak (Q. lyrata). The least preferred foods are acorns of swamp chestnut oak (Q. michauxii) and overcup oak. In California, fox squirrels feed on English walnuts (J. regia), oranges, avocados, strawberries, and tomatoes. In midwinter, they feed on eucalyptus seeds.

In Michigan, fox squirrels feed on a variety of foods throughout the year. Spring foods are mainly tree buds and flowers, insects, bird eggs, and seeds of red maple (Acer rubrum), silver maple (Acer saccharinum), and elms. Summer foods include a variety of berries, plum and cherry pits, fruits of basswood (Tilia americana), fruits of box elder (Acer negundo), black oak acorns, hickory nuts, seeds of sugar (Acer saccharum) and black maple (Acer nigrum), grains, insects, and unripe corn. Autumn foods consist mainly of acorns, hickory nuts, beechnuts, walnuts, butternuts (Juglans cinerea), and hazelnuts. Caches of acorns and hickory nuts are heavily used in winter.

=== Reproduction ===
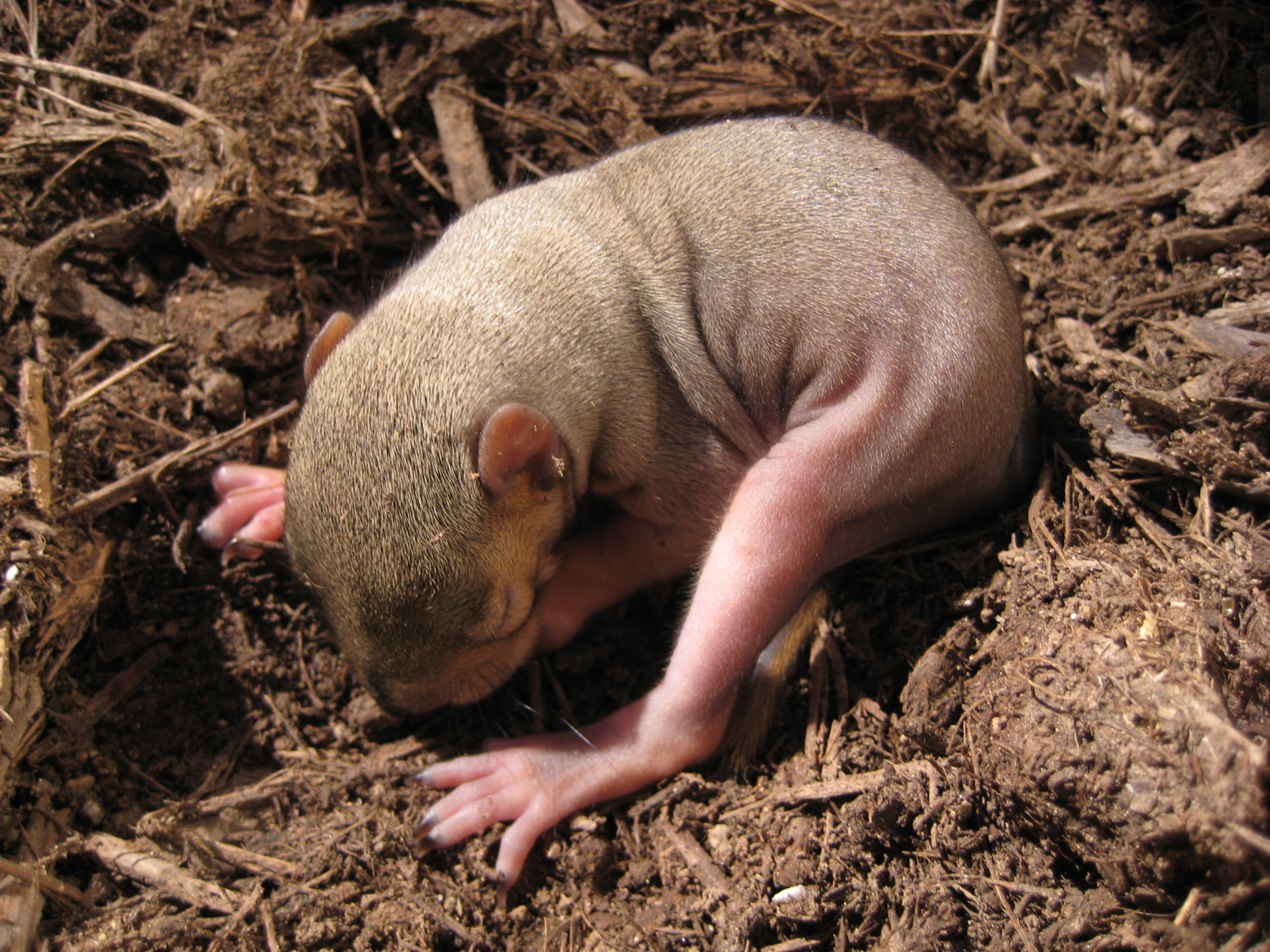
A fox squirrel pup

Female fox squirrels come into estrus in mid-December or early January, then again in June. They normally produce two litters a year; however, yearling females may only produce one. Females become sexually mature at 10 to 11 months of age and usually produce their first litter when they are 1 year old. Females may bear young at 8 months of age, yet most reproduce after 16 months of age. The reproductive longevity of the squirrel may be over 12 years.

Gestation occurs over a period of 44 to 45 days. The earliest litters appear in late January; most births occur in mid-March and July. The average litter size is three, but can vary according to season and food conditions.

Tree cavities, usually those formed by woodpeckers, are remodeled into winter dens and often serve as nurseries for late winter litters. If existing trees lack cavities, leaf nests known as dreys are built by cutting twigs with leaves and weaving them into warm, waterproof shelters. Similar leafy platforms are built for summer litters and are often called "cooling beds."

Fox squirrels, like other tree squirrels, develop slowly compared to others. At birth, the young are blind, without fur, and helpless. Their eyes open at 4 to 5 weeks and their ears open at 6 weeks. Fox squirrels are weaned between 12 and 14 weeks, but may not be self-supporting until 16 weeks. Juveniles usually disperse in September or October, but may den either together or with their mother during their first winter.

=== Mortality ===
In captivity, fox squirrels have been known to live about 18 years, but in the wild, most fox squirrels die before they become adults. Their maximum life expectancy is typically 12.6 years for females and 8.6 years for males. Because of overhunting and the destruction of mature forests, many subspecies of fox squirrel are endangered. Another major cause of fox squirrel population decline is mange mites (Cnemidoptes spp.) along with severe winter weather.

Relatively few natural predators can regularly capture adult fox squirrels. Of these predators, most only take fox squirrels opportunistically. Predators include bobcats (Lynx rufus), Canada lynx (L. canadensis), red foxes (Vulpes vulpes), gray foxes (Urocyon cinereoargenteus), red-tailed hawks (Buteo jamaicensis), red-shouldered hawks (B. lineatus), great horned owls (Bubo virginianus), barred owls (Strix varia), and coyotes (Canis latrans). Former predators extirpated from most of the fox squirrel's range include cougars (Puma concolor) and wolves (Canis lupus). Nestlings and young fox squirrels are particularly vulnerable to climbing predators such as raccoons (Procyon lotor), opossums (Didelphis virginiana), rat snakes (Pantherophis spp.), and pine snakes (Pituophis melanoleucus). In those states where fox squirrels are not protected, they are considered a game animal. Fox squirrels were an important source of meat for European settlers in the 17th and 18th centuries. They are still hunted over most of their range.

In Florida, fox squirrels may be eaten by some growth stage of invasive snakes such as Burmese pythons, reticulated pythons, Central African rock pythons, Southern African rock pythons, boa constrictors, yellow anacondas, Bolivian anacondas, dark-spotted anacondas, and green anacondas.

=== Vocalization ===
The most common vocalization for fox squirrels is a series of barks. Tooth chatters and breathy barks are indications of stress. Grunts and squeals are given by restrained animals and during male-male chase.

=== Disease ===
The Eastern Fox squirrel (S. niger) carried diseases that have spread all over the earth. A case study in Wisconsin was performed, where a group of critters including squirrels were found dead due to having a case of the West Nile Virus. It was said that squirrels like S. niger were used to find the spread: "Tree squirrels are useful in WNV surveillance and provide localized evidence of WNV transmission to mammals”.

West Nile virus has been documented in fox squirrels in California. In a 2004-2005 California surveillance study, 68 of 140 fox squirrels tested positive for the virus. The study found that tree squirrels can provide localized evidence of West Nile virus transmission to mammals and may be useful for surveillance.

== See also ==
- Mexican fox squirrel
- Eastern gray squirrel
- Western gray squirrel
