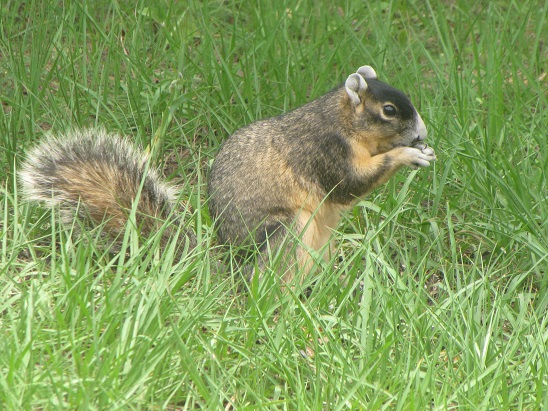

Scientific classification
- Kingdom: Animalia
- Phylum: Chordata
- Class: Mammalia
- Infraclass: Placentalia
- Order: Rodentia
- Family: Sciuridae
- Genus: Sciurus
- Species: S. niger
- Subspecies: S. n. shermani

Trinomial name
- Sciurus niger shermani Moore, 1956

= Sherman's fox squirrel =

Subspecies of rodent

Sherman's fox squirrel (Sciurus niger shermani) is a subspecies of the fox squirrel. It lives in the U.S. states of Florida and Georgia in fire-prone areas of longleaf pine and wiregrass, especially around sandhills. A tree squirrel, Sherman's fox squirrel has lost much of its habitat to farming and development. This type of squirrel nests in oak trees using leaves and Spanish moss. The squirrel is named after professor H. B. Sherman, who studied small mammals in Florida, and is known for creating the Sherman trap.

== Description ==
In comparison to other fox squirrels, this subspecies is large (23 - 28 in. = 600 – 700 mm) with highly variable dorsal fur color ranging from nearly all black (uncommon) to silver, with variations of black over silver and silver over black. The underside is tan, while the head is generally black; the ears and muzzle are often white. The tail is long, nearly the length of the head and torso.The Fox squirrel is generally found to be slightly larger than the more common eastern gray squirrel, and slower in speed. This subspecies does not exhibit any sexual dimorphism between the males and females.

== Diet ==
Their diet is consistent with that of most fox squirrels; with this subspecies' diet mostly consisting of acorns of live oaks. Their diet could also include mast, insects, tree buds, bulbs, roots, bird eggs, and more depending on seasonality.

== Habitat ==
Most nesting occurs in winter seasons, usually within oak trees. Males usually exhibit a larger habitat range due to breeding season travel. Dwindling resources, and decreasing habitat availability is partly to blame for the recently increased home ranges. They usually inhabit areas with a high concentration of longleaf pines, and show preference for areas with low woody cover. This indicates that they thrive in environments featuring frequent disturbances, such as controlled burns. This is a prevalent feature of properly conserved longleaf pine ecosystems.

== Taxonomy ==
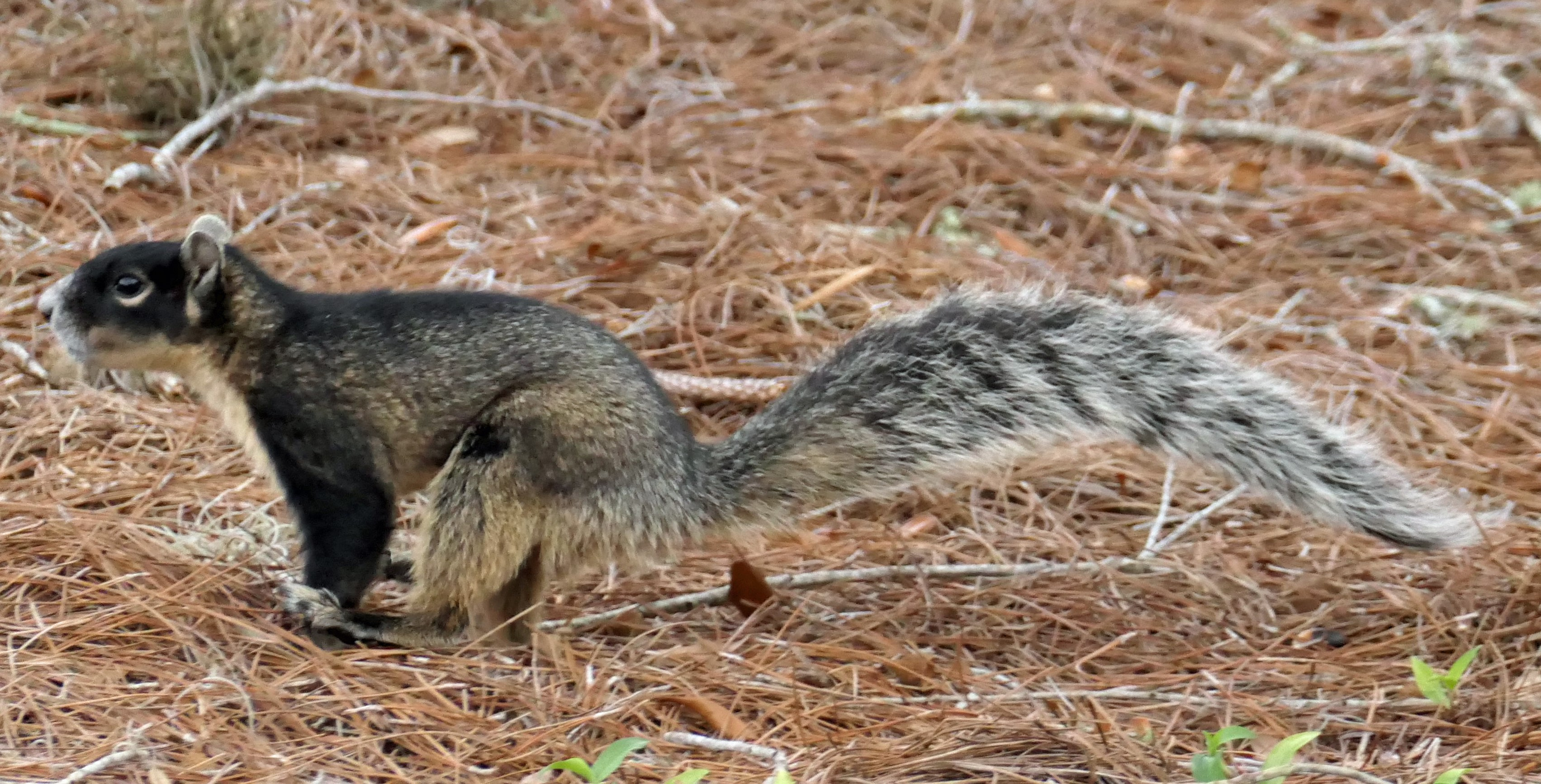
A Sherman's fox squirrel in Central Florida

As is stated in a 2017 report by the Florida Fish and Wildlife Commission: "New analysis in 2014 and 2015 determined that the Sherman's fox squirrel is not genetically distinct from other fox squirrels in north and central Florida making it appropriate to group all fox squirrels north of the Caloosahatchee River as Southern fox squirrels (Sciurus niger niger)." The Florida Fish and Wildlife Conservation Commission (FWC) specifically states that "The southern fox squirrel, previously classified as Sherman's fox squirrel, is a large rodent member of the Family Sciuridae." A 2017 FWC report states, "they [S. n. niger and S. n. shermani] may still deserve recognition as separate management units, based on morphological variations."

The Georgia Department of Natural Resources, Wildlife Resource Division website states "The delineations between the ranges of the fox squirrel subspecies were originally determined by morphological measurements and pelage coloration." They further clarify, "However, recent research has revealed no genetic structure in fox squirrels in North and Central Florida, indicating that S. n. niger, S. n. bachmani (Bachman's fox squirrel), and S. n. shermani may not be genetically distinct subspecies. It is possible these subspecies should be identified and managed as a single subspecies, although they may still deserve recognition as separate management units, based on slight morphological variation. Another recent study found no evident genetic or ecological differences between S. n. niger and S. n. shermani in Georgia, though more investigation is needed to determine the validity of all subspecies of S. niger in Georgia and Florida."

== Conservation ==
Sherman's fox squirrels rely heavily on the longleaf pine savanna ecosystem that is found in southern Georgia and northern Florida, in which the ecosystem has been a hot topic within conservation research. These squirrels are seen as an obligate species of the longleaf pine. Sherman's fox squirrel was once designated as a species of special concern in Florida but, due to their resiliency "to habitat modification" and their wider distribution as part of S. n. niger, the status was dropped. However, with the endemicity of this subspecies, it is important to consider their population growth rates in tandem with other conservation efforts within the Southeast U.S.. Additionally, with increasing climate change Sherman's fox squirrels are at an immediate disadvantage.

The other fox squirrel subspecies in Florida is the mangrove or Big Cypress fox squirrel (S. n. avicennia), which lives southwest of Lake Okeechobee. This subspecies is also facing issues with habitat degradation in forested wetlands.
