= Mary Gregory (disambiguation) =

Mary Gregory (1856–1908) was an American artist specializing in glass painting.

Mary Gregory may also refer to:

- Mary Rogers Gregory (1846–1919), American portrait artist
- Sister Mary Gregory (1928–2013), American author, educator and theologian, also known as Jeanne Knoerle
- Elizabeth Fitzhenry (before 1735–c. 1790), Irish actress also credited as Mary Gregory
- E. Mary Gregory, American plaintiff in 1885 Supreme Court case of Gregory v. Hartley
- Lady Mary Gregory (1719–1769), daughter of Henry Grey, 1st Duke of Kent
