= Fort Walton Beach, Florida =

- City
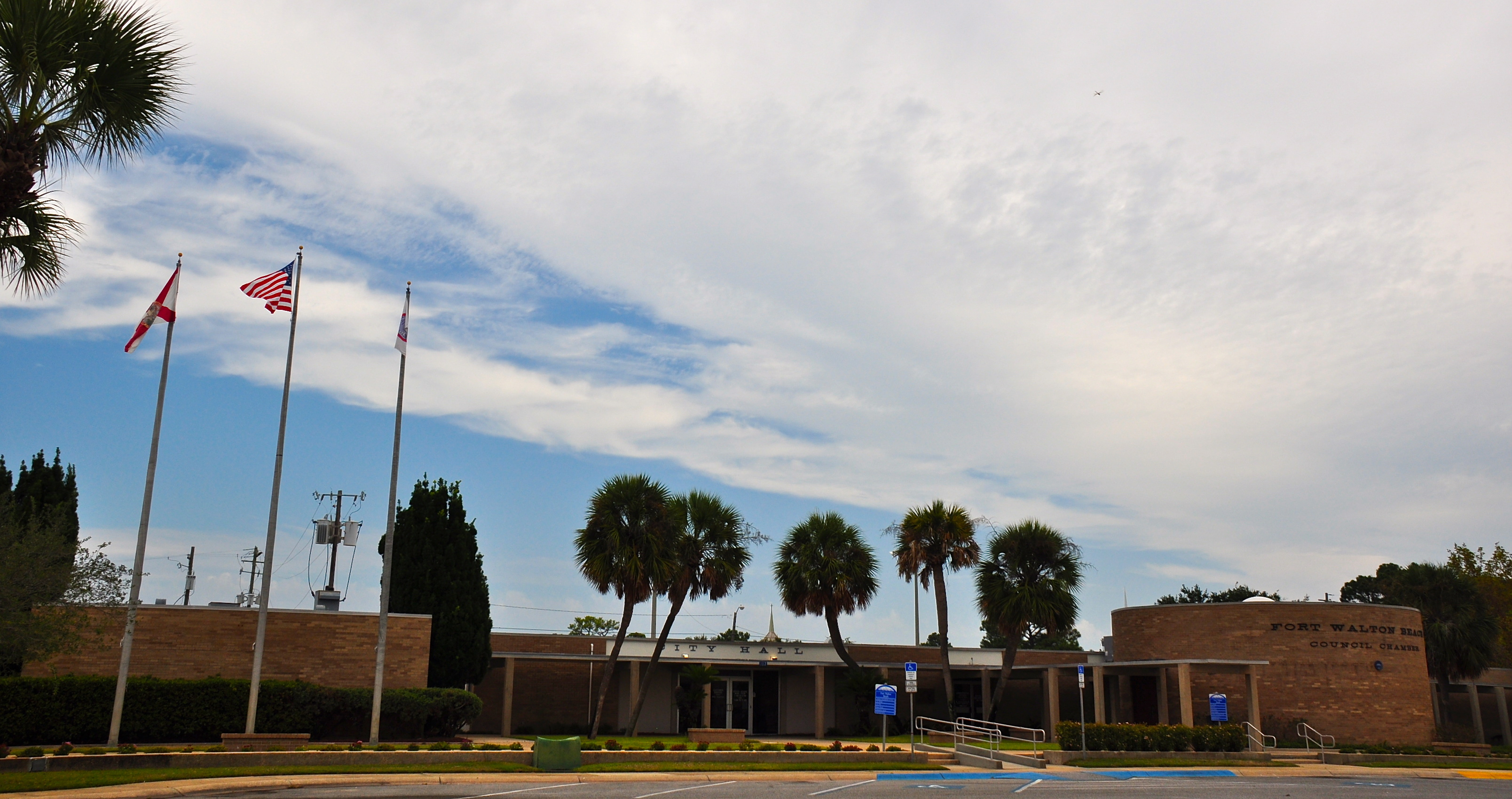
- Fort Walton Beach City Hall, September 2014

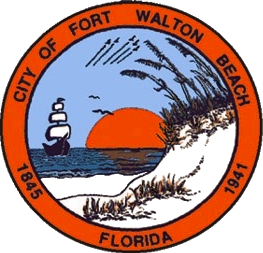
- Seal
- Nicknames: "The Emerald Coast", "The Camellia City", "The Sonic City" (Note: Archaic, used from the 1950s to 1970s.)
- Motto: "A City On The Move!"
- Location in Okaloosa County and the state of Florida
- Coordinates: 30°25′25″N 86°37′50″W
- Country: United States
- State: Florida
- County: Okaloosa
- Incorporated (city): 1941

Government
  - Mayor: Nic Allegretto
  - City council: Councillors: Logan Browning; David Schmidt; Debi Riley; Gloria DeBerry; Ben Merrill; Bryce Jeter; Payne Walker

Area
  - Total: 7.72 sq mi (20.00 km^{2})
  - Land: 7.64 sq mi (19.79 km^{2})
  - Water: 0.077 sq mi (0.20 km^{2})
- Elevation: 23 ft (7.0 m)

Population (2020 census)
  - Total: 20,922
  - Density: 2,737.6/sq mi (1,056.99/km^{2})
- Time zone: UTC−6 (CST)
  - Summer (DST): UTC−5 (CDT)
- ZIP Codes: 32547-32549
- Area code: 850
- FIPS code: 12-24475
- GNIS feature ID: 2403650
- Website: http://www.fwb.org

Fort Walton Beach, often referred to by the initialism FWB, is a city in southern Okaloosa County, Florida, United States. As of the 2020 census, Fort Walton Beach had a population of 20,922. It is a principal city of the Crestview−Fort Walton Beach−Destin, Florida Metropolitan Statistical Area.

Fort Walton Beach is a year-round fishing and beach resort community. Its busiest time of the year is the summer, causing a boost to the local economy because of tourism.

== History ==
Prehistoric settlement of Fort Walton Beach is attributed to the mound building "Fort Walton Culture" that flourished from approximately 1100–1550 CE. It is believed that this culture evolved out of the Weeden Island culture. Fort Walton also appeared to come about due to contact with the major Mississippian centers to the north and west. It was the most complex in the north-west Florida region. The Fort Walton peoples put into practice mound building and intensive agriculture, made pottery in a variety of vessel shapes, and had hierarchical settlement patterns that reflected other Mississippian societies.

The first Europeans to set foot in what is now Okaloosa County and the Fort Walton Beach area were members of Álvar Núñez Cabeza de Vaca's party, who traveled by boat from what is now Panama City Beach, Florida, in 1528 to Texas:

Then we set out to sea again, coasting towards the River of Palms. Every day our thirst and hunger increased because our supplies were giving out, as well as the water supply, for the pouches we had made from the legs of our horses soon became rotten and useless. From time to time we would enter some inlet or cove that reached very far inland, but we found them all shallow and dangerous, and so we navigated through them for thirty days, meeting sometimes Indians who fished and were poor and wretched people.

The area is described at "40 deaths a day" in a Spanish map dated 1566. In later English and French maps the area was noted as "Baya Santa Rosa" or "Bay St. Rose". A number of Spanish artifacts, including a portion of brigantine leather armor, are housed in the Indian Temple Mound Museum.

Contrary to popular belief, there is no documentary evidence of pirates using the area as a base of operations. Piracy was rampant in the Gulf of Mexico from pirates working out of Hispaniola, the Caribbean, and the Florida Keys. Notable raids occurred in 1683 and 1687 against the Spanish fort at San Marcos de Apalachee (by French and English buccaneers), a 1712 raid against Port Dauphin (now Alabama) by English pirates from Martinique, and the actions of the late 18th-century adventurer William Augustus Bowles, who was based in Apalachicola. Bowles was never referred to as "Billy Bowlegs" in period documentation; his Creek name was "Estajoca".

During the era of Spanish and English colonization, the area of what was to become Fort Walton Beach was noted in several journals but no worthwhile presence was established.

Early settlers of Walton County, Florida, were the first to establish permanent settlements in what is now Fort Walton Beach (the area was originally named "Anderson"). Two of the first settlers were John Anderson and Andrew A. Alvarez, who received land plots in 1838. The name "Anderson" is noted on maps from 1838 to 1884. It was not until 1911 that the name "Camp Walton" appeared on Florida maps.

In 1861, Camp Walton was a Confederate Army camp, a fortified post, made up of the "Walton Guards", an independent Company of Florida Volunteer Infantry from Walton County. At this time, Okaloosa County did not yet exist. Walton County received its name from Col. George Walton, who served as secretary of West Florida during Andrew Jackson's governorship (1821–1822) and whose father, George Walton Sr., was the 56th signatory of the Declaration of Independence. He is also the namesake of Walton County.

Camp Walton was located between the Indian Temple Mound, now known as the Heritage Park and Cultural Center, and the Santa Rosa Sound, its mission was to protect the "Narrows" from Union ships. Although the "Walton Guards" did not see much action, they did keep busy by digging up prehistoric Indian remains buried in the Indian Temple Mound and displaying them at camp. The post was abandoned in August 1862, and the "Walton Guards" were assigned to reinforce the 1st Florida Infantry Regiment, with duty in the Western Theatre on the Tennessee front.

On April 11, 1879, John Thomas Brooks purchased at a public auction in Milton, Florida, 111 acres (45 ha) in Section 24, Township 2, Range 24 of Santa Rosa County, a portion of the property of Henry Penny whose heirs had failed to pay the taxes on the estate. This parcel on the Santa Rosa Sound became what is now downtown Fort Walton Beach.

The United States Post Office changed the official name on their cancellations from Camp Walton to Fort Walton on March 1, 1932.

The 1940 census counted 90 residents in Fort Walton. Fort Walton was incorporated by a state senate bill effective June 16, 1941.

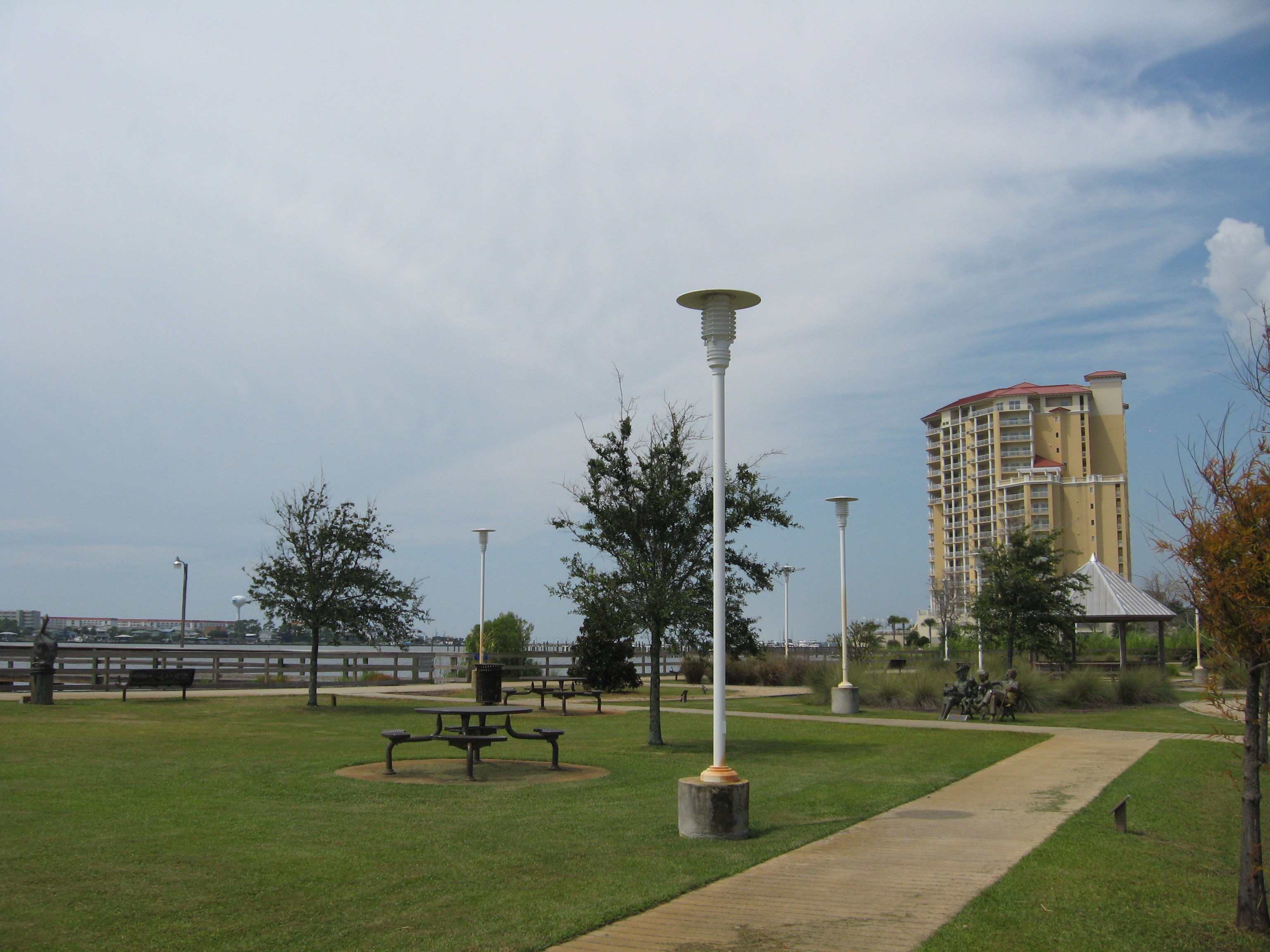
View from Sound Park looking west towards Presidio Condominium.

The community's name was officially changed from Fort Walton to Fort Walton Beach on June 15, 1953, by agreement with the state legislature in Tallahassee, and incorporated a portion of Santa Rosa Island formerly known as Tower Beach. Tower Beach, named for a tall observation tower at the site which was later destroyed by a hurricane, had been an amusement area operated from 1928 by the Island Amusement Company by future-Fort Walton Beach mayor Thomas E. Brooks, with a boardwalk, casino, restaurant, dance pavilion, "40 modernly equipped beach cottages", and concession stands which was largely destroyed by fire on Saturday, March 7, 1942. Wartime supply restrictions prevented a reconstruction. This 875-acre (354 ha) parcel of Santa Rosa Island with three miles of Gulf frontage was conveyed to Okaloosa County on July 8, 1950, in an informal ceremony at the county courthouse in Crestview, Florida. The county paid the federal government $4,000 ($53,527 in 2025) to complete the transaction, the result of the efforts of Congressman Bob Sikes. The portion of Santa Rosa Island transferred is now known as Okaloosa Island. The remaining Tower Beach summer cottages were removed after the 1955 tourist season as the new Okaloosa Island Authority redeveloped the site with a new hotel and casino. The government was changed to a city manager form.

A special census conducted in 1956 listed 9,456 residents, which grew to 11,249 by 1960.

The last of three county-owned buildings on Okaloosa Island was torn down on May 31, 1995. The buildings had originally housed the Okaloosa Island Authority and more recently the Okaloosa County Council on Aging. The 1.3-acre (0.53 ha) tract on the north side of Santa Rosa Boulevard was sold.

== Geography ==
According to the United States Census Bureau, the city has a total area of 21.3 km^{2} (8.2 mi^{2}), of which 19.3 km^{2} (7.5 mi^{2}) is land and 2 km^{2} (0.77 mi^{2}), or 9.26%, is water.

=== Climate ===
Fort Walton Beach experiences hot and very humid summers, generally from late May to mid-September. Autumns, from mid-September to early December, are generally warm. Winters are very short and mild, from mid-December to late February. Springs are warm, from late February to late May.

Fort Walton Beach averages 55.35 inches (140.6 cm) of rain each year. The wettest season is summer and the driest season is autumn, although flood season continues into autumn.

Snow and freezing rain are very rare. Freezing rain occurs about once every 5 to 10 years. Snow occurs about once every 10 to 15 years. The most significant snowfall in the city's history was on January 21, 2025, during the 2025 Gulf Coast blizzard, when 7.5 inches (19 cm) fell on the city. Other significant winter precipitation events that affected the city include January 1977, and on January 28, 2014, during the January 2014 Gulf Coast winter storm.

The Köppen climate classification subtype for this climate is humid subtropical climate (Cfa),

Climate data for Fort Walton Beach, Florida (Destin–Fort Walton Beach Airport), 1991–2020 normals, extremes 1996–present
Month	Jan	Feb	Mar	Apr	May	Jun	Jul	Aug	Sep	Oct	Nov	Dec	Year
Record high °F (°C)	89 (32)	81 (27)	86 (30)	89 (32)	98 (37)	102 (39)	99 (37)	100 (38)	100 (38)	93 (34)	91 (33)	85 (29)	102 (39)
Mean maximum °F (°C)	74.1 (23.4)	74.3 (23.5)	79.6 (26.4)	83.3 (28.5)	91.1 (32.8)	94.5 (34.7)	95.2 (35.1)	95.2 (35.1)	93.5 (34.2)	88.7 (31.5)	81.1 (27.3)	77.2 (25.1)	97.3 (36.3)
Mean daily maximum °F (°C)	63.1 (17.3)	65.8 (18.8)	70.7 (21.5)	76.2 (24.6)	83.5 (28.6)	88.9 (31.6)	90.9 (32.7)	90.6 (32.6)	88.5 (31.4)	80.9 (27.2)	72.1 (22.3)	65.6 (18.7)	78.1 (25.6)
Daily mean °F (°C)	54.2 (12.3)	56.9 (13.8)	62.2 (16.8)	68.1 (20.1)	75.8 (24.3)	81.5 (27.5)	83.6 (28.7)	83.2 (28.4)	80.5 (26.9)	72.1 (22.3)	62.6 (17.0)	56.6 (13.7)	69.8 (21.0)
Mean daily minimum °F (°C)	45.3 (7.4)	47.9 (8.8)	53.6 (12.0)	60.1 (15.6)	68.0 (20.0)	74.1 (23.4)	76.2 (24.6)	75.8 (24.3)	72.4 (22.4)	63.2 (17.3)	53.0 (11.7)	47.5 (8.6)	61.4 (16.3)
Mean minimum °F (°C)	28.6 (−1.9)	33.2 (0.7)	38.8 (3.8)	49.5 (9.7)	57.9 (14.4)	69.3 (20.7)	72.2 (22.3)	72.5 (22.5)	64.5 (18.1)	49.0 (9.4)	38.7 (3.7)	35.0 (1.7)	27.1 (−2.7)
Record low °F (°C)	20 (−7)	23 (−5)	30 (−1)	41 (5)	49 (9)	62 (17)	66 (19)	66 (19)	55 (13)	42 (6)	30 (−1)	22 (−6)	20 (−7)
Average precipitation inches (mm)	4.52 (115)	4.96 (126)	4.70 (119)	4.55 (116)	3.22 (82)	4.70 (119)	5.77 (147)	6.08 (154)	5.18 (132)	2.82 (72)	4.13 (105)	4.72 (120)	55.35 (1,406)
Average precipitation days (≥ 0.01 in)	10.0	9.4	8.7	7.9	6.4	9.7	11.2	12.4	8.2	6.1	8.9	10.6	109.5
Source: NOAA (mean maxima and minima 2006–2020

== Transportation ==
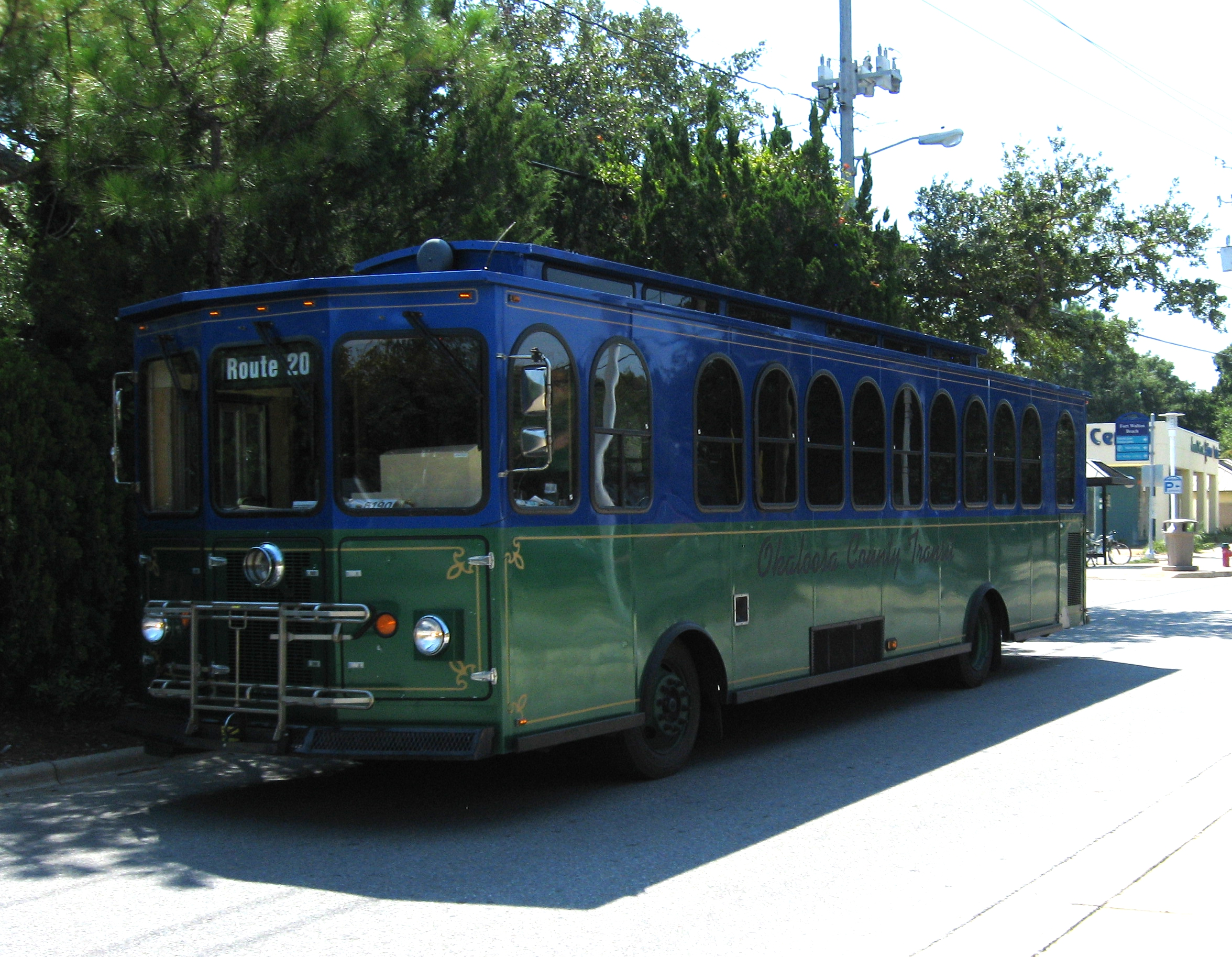
Okaloosa County Transit Trolley, July 2011

=== Airports ===
Nearby Destin-Fort Walton Beach Airport (airport code VPS) serves Fort Walton Beach, as well as Valparaiso, Florida. Airlines that currently serve Destin-Fort Walton Beach Airport are Allegiant Airlines, American Eagle, Southwest, Delta Air Lines, and Delta Connection. They provide non-stop service to Atlanta, Cincinnati, Charlotte, Dallas, Fort Lauderdale, Houston, Las Vegas, Knoxville, Memphis, Oklahoma City, and St. Louis.

Okaloosa County Transit provides public transportation throughout Fort Walton Beach as well as Okaloosa County. Its main stop and transfer location is Uptown Station located on State Road 85, a little over one mile (1.6 km) north of US 98.

=== Major highways ===
State Road 189 is a north–south highway from State Road 85 to US 98 in downtown Fort Walton Beach. State Road 85 is a north–south highway that leads north 27 miles (43 km) to Crestview, the Okaloosa County seat (also along Interstate 10), and ends at US 98 in downtown Fort Walton Beach. US 98 is an east–west highway, which runs through downtown Fort Walton Beach. The Brooks Bridge over the Santa Rosa Sound connects downtown Fort Walton Beach with Okaloosa Island, which is along the route of US 98. US 98 leads east 9 miles (14 km) to Destin and west 41 miles (66 km) to Pensacola.

== Demographics ==
Historical population
Census	Pop.	Note	%±
1950	2,463		—
1960	12,147		393.2%
1970	19,994		64.6%
1980	20,829		4.2%
1990	21,471		3.1%
2000	19,973		−7.0%
2010	19,507		−2.3%
2020	20,922		7.3%
U.S. Decennial Census

=== Racial and ethnic composition ===
Fort Walton Beach racial composition (Hispanics excluded from racial categories) (NH = Non-Hispanic)
Race	Pop 2010	Pop 2020	% 2010	% 2020
White (NH)	14,245	13,777	73.03%	65.85%
Black or African American (NH)	2,331	2,284	11.95%	10.92%
Native American or Alaska Native (NH)	104	65	0.53%	0.31%
Asian (NH)	618	828	3.17%	3.96%
Pacific Islander or Native Hawaiian (NH)	54	20	0.28%	0.10%
Some other race (NH)	31	122	0.16%	0.58%
Two or more races/Multiracial (NH)	586	1,382	3.00%	6.61%
Hispanic or Latino (any race)	1,538	2,444	7.88%	11.68%
Total	19,507	20,922		

=== 2020 census ===
As of the 2020 census, Fort Walton Beach had a population of 20,922. The median age was 41.5 years. 19.0% of residents were under the age of 18 and 19.6% of residents were 65 years of age or older. For every 100 females there were 98.1 males, and for every 100 females age 18 and over there were 96.5 males age 18 and over.

100.0% of residents lived in urban areas, while 0.0% lived in rural areas.

There were 9,036 households in Fort Walton Beach, of which 25.1% had children under the age of 18 living in them. Of all households, 40.1% were married-couple households, 22.5% were households with a male householder and no spouse or partner present, and 30.1% were households with a female householder and no spouse or partner present. About 33.0% of all households were made up of individuals and 13.8% had someone living alone who was 65 years of age or older.

There were 10,000 housing units, of which 9.6% were vacant. The homeowner vacancy rate was 2.0% and the rental vacancy rate was 8.1%.

Racial composition as of the 2020 census
Race	Number	Percent
White	14,287	68.3%
Black or African American	2,369	11.3%
American Indian and Alaska Native	113	0.5%
Asian	844	4.0%
Native Hawaiian and Other Pacific Islander	26	0.1%
Some other race	1,041	5.0%
Two or more races	2,242	10.7%
Hispanic or Latino (of any race)	2,444	11.7%

=== 2010 census ===
As of the 2010 United States census, there were 19,507 people, 8,657 households, and 4,950 families residing in the city.

=== 2000 census ===
As of the census of 2000, there are 19,973 people, 8,460 households, and 5,422 families residing in the city. The population density is 1,036.5/km^{2} (2,683.0/mi^{2}). There are 9,007 housing units at an average density of 467.4/km^{2} (1,209.9/mi^{2}). The racial makeup of the city is 78.84% White, 13.34% African American, 0.45% Native American, 2.72% Asian, 0.08% Pacific Islander, 1.22% from other races, and 3.36% from two or more races. 4.04% of the population are Hispanic or Latino of any race.

In 2000, there are 8,460 households out of which 26.0% have children under the age of 18 living with them, 47.3% are married couples living together, 12.6% have a female householder with no husband present, and 35.9% are non-families. 28.5% of all households are made up of individuals and 9.6% have someone living alone who is 65 years of age or older. The average household size is 2.33 and the average family size is 2.85.

In 2000, in the city, the population was spread out, with 22.4% under the age of 18, 8.9% from 18 to 24, 29.3% from 25 to 44, 23.1% from 45 to 64, and 16.3% who were 65 years of age or older. The median age was 39 years. For every 100 females, there were 96.2 males. For every 100 females age 18 and over, there were 94.5 males.

In 2000, the median income for a household in the city was $40,153, and the median income for a family was $45,791. Males had a median income of $29,709 versus $21,641 for females. The per capita income for the city was $21,085. About 7.3% of families and 9.9% of the population were below the poverty line, including 16.2% of those under age 18 and 4.1% of those aged 65 or over.

== Notable people ==
- John C. Acton, serves as the director of operations coordination for DHS
- Aric Almirola, NASCAR driver with three Cup Series wins
- Glen Coffee, running back for Alabama Crimson Tide and in NFL; San Francisco 49ers
- Richard Covey, astronaut
- Bud Day, Vietnam prisoner of war, Medal of Honor and Air Force Cross recipient
- Jason Elam, NFL kicker with Denver Broncos
- Scott Fletcher, MLB baseball infielder
- Scott Frank, screenwriter
- Matt Gaetz, American politician
- Shane Gibson, internationally known heavy metal guitarist
- E. G. Green, NFL wide receiver, Indianapolis Colts
- D. J. Hall, Alabama and NFL wide receiver
- Edward L. Hubbard, retired Air Force officer and Vietnam Prisoner of War
- Mike James (born 1967), Major League Baseball pitcher for three teams
- Michael Johnson, South Carolina politician
- Nancy Kenaston, public relations director, court reporter at Nuremberg trials
- Rick Malambri, actor
- Brian Marshall, bass player for rock bands
- Demetria McKinney, actress
- Maurice McLaughlin, politician
- Lonnie R. Moore, Korean War Double Ace
- Matt Moore, pitcher for the Texas Rangers
- Carolyn Murphy, internationally acclaimed model (born in Panama City, Florida)
- Jimmy Patronis, American politician
- Preston Shumpert, basketball player, Syracuse
- Akeem Spence, NFL (Miami Dolphins) and University of Illinois defensive tackle
- Joe Stanley, retired U.S. Air Force colonel, commander of Eglin Air Force Base during 1950s
- Danny Wuerffel, 1996 Heisman Trophy winner for Florida and quarterback for New Orleans Saints

== Economy ==
The economy of Fort Walton Beach is driven by two primary factors: tourism and the military. There are two major Air Force bases which border Fort Walton Beach. Hurlburt Field is home to Headquarters, Air Force Special Operations Command (AFSOC) and the 1st Special Operations Wing. Eglin AFB is home to the Air Force Materiel Command's Air Force Life Cycle Management Center's Armament Directorate and the 96th Test Wing, Air Combat Command's 53rd Wing, and Air Education Training Command's 33rd Fighter Wing. Eglin is geographically one of the largest Air Force bases at 724 square miles (1,880 km^{2}), and thus home to joint exercises, and missile and bomb testing. For example, the 'Massive Ordnance Air Blast' or 'Mother of All Bombs' (MOAB) was first tested at Eglin AFB on March 11, 2003.

There is support industry in the area that benefits from the presence of the bases, including military contractors and the service industry.

The tourism industry is seasonal, with summer being the primary season, and a smaller peak season during spring break. The area also boasts a large snowbird population, which includes the Fort Walton Beach Snowbird Club. The Billy Bowlegs Pirate Festival is held annually in May.

=== Top employers ===
According to Fort Walton Beach's 2010 Comprehensive Annual Financial Report, the top employers in the city were:

#	Employer	Employees
1	Eglin Air Force Base	16,476
2	Hurlburt Field	11,171
3	Okaloosa County School District	3,278
4	Okaloosa County	1,383
5	Fort Walton Beach Medical Center	1,305
6	DRS Technologies	875
7	InDyne	786
8	Northwest Florida State College	763
9	ResortQuest	750
10	BAE Systems	700
