= Gorrie Elementary School =

Coordinates: 27.9393°N 82.4679°W

Gorrie Elementary School (1889), originally the Hyde Park School, is a historic building in Tampa, Florida. It was renamed in 1915 to honor John Gorrie. It is a two story brick building the St. Petersburg Times called a "jewel". Singer and actress Mary Hatcher attended the school.
