= Brooks Bridge =

Bridge in Florida, United States of America

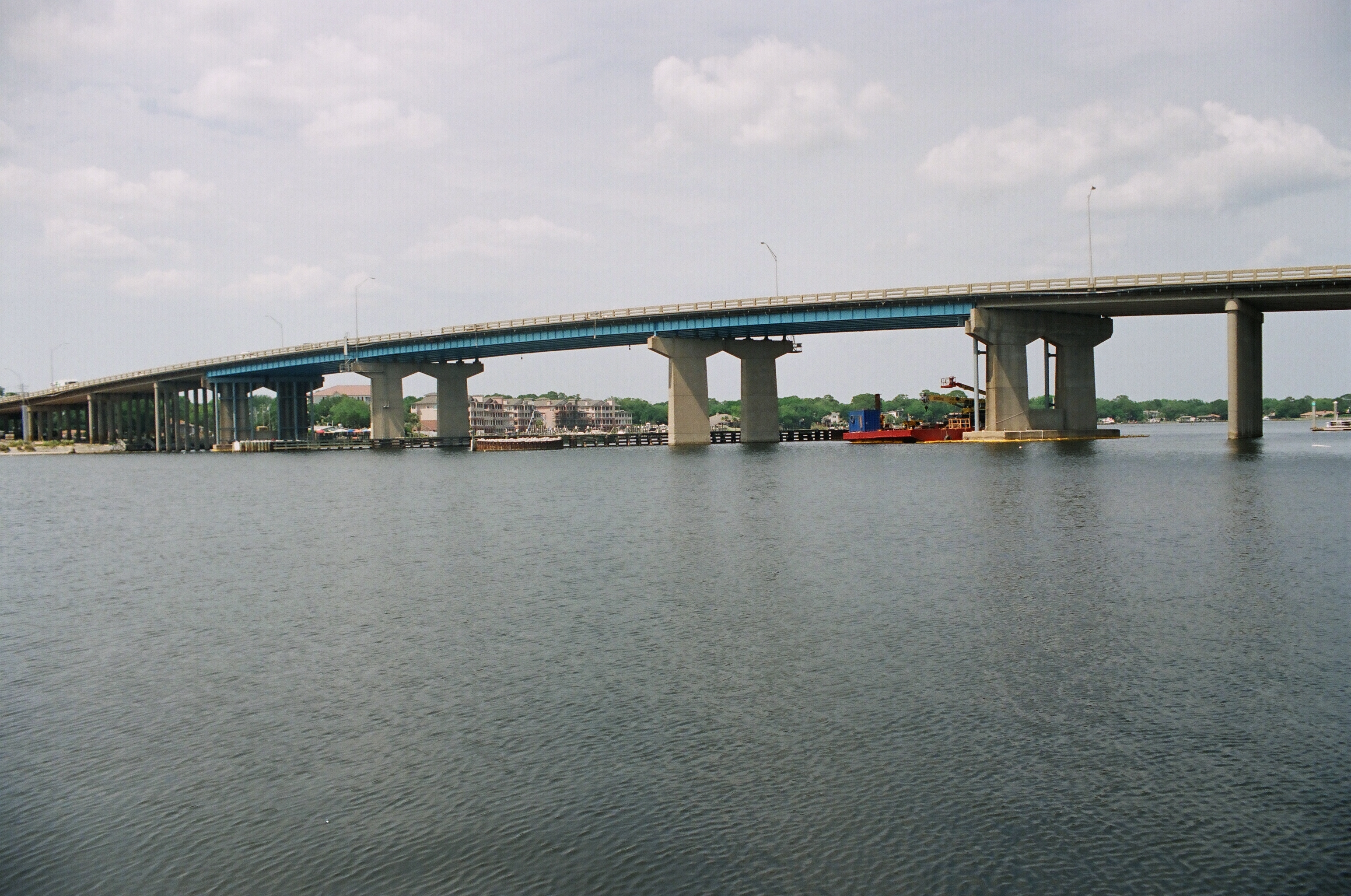
- John T. Brooks Bridge over the Gulf Coast Intracoastal Waterway at Fort Walton Beach, Florida, May 2015.
- Coordinates: 30.400908°N 86.600437°W
- Carries: US 98
- Crosses: Santa Rosa Sound
- Locale: Fort Walton Beach, Florida to Okaloosa Island
- ID number: 303566

Characteristics
- Clearance below: 50 feet (15.24 m)

History
- Construction start: 1965
- Construction end: 1966
- Opened: 1966

Location
- Interactive map of Brooks Bridge

The Brooks Bridge is a four-lane steel and concrete structure that carries highway U.S. Route 98 (US 98) over Santa Rosa Sound (mile 223 of the Gulf Coast Intracoastal Waterway) just west of the Choctawhatchee Bay between downtown Fort Walton Beach, Florida and the 3-mile-long (4.8 km) section of Okaloosa Island controlled by the city of Fort Walton Beach. It is named for John Thomas Brooks, who, in 1868, purchased 111 acres of what is now downtown Fort Walton Beach. The area on the north side of the sound where the bridge connects was known as Brooks Landing. It has a charted clearance of 50 feet (15 m) above the water.

Constructed in 1965–1966, it replaced a 1935-vintage low-level steel through-truss center-pier swing-span structure immediately west of the current bridge which had become increasingly unreliable with age, the center-pivoting span having been known to get stuck in the open position while allowing for transit of maritime traffic. Removal of the steel work and the old concrete pivot pier began in March 1966 by the U.S. Army Corps of Engineers as the new Brooks Bridge reached completion with removal taking about three weeks.

As the only local crossing of the Santa Rosa Sound, it is subject to traffic congestion. Vehicular speed limits on the span are 35 miles per hour (56 km/h) eastbound and 25 miles per hour (40 km/h) westbound. An additional bridge between Fort Walton Beach and Okaloosa Island has been discussed for many years. On December 20, 2013, the Florida Department of Transportation announced it had begun planning for the replacement of the 47-year-old bridge. In April 2015 the FDOT announced another proposal for a pair of bridges.

A "rehab job" on the 50-year-old structure was underway by the FDOT in April 2015. "What we're doing there is some work to extend the lifespan of the bridge," DOT district spokesman Ian Satter said. "They're working with the bearings on the bridge, which we do maintenance on throughout all of our bridges in the district." Crews are also installing some "additional support mechanisms," Satter said. The work, which is being done under the bridge with help from a large barge, is expected to last until mid- to late May 2015. Brooks Bridge has been deemed structurally deficient and is currently being replaced.
