= SS John Gorrie =

Liberty ship of WWII

History

United States
- Name: John Gorrie
- Namesake: John Gorrie
- Owner: War Shipping Administration (WSA)
- Operator: Waterman Steamship Corp.
- Ordered: as type (EC2-S-C1) hull, MC hull 1194
- Builder: St. Johns River Shipbuilding Company, Jacksonville, Florida
- Cost: $2,557,072
- Yard number: 2
- Way number: 2
- Laid down: 29 August 1942
- Launched: 27 March 1943
- Sponsored by: Mrs. Denis J. O'Mahoney
- Completed: 24 May 1943
- Identification: Call sign: KITY
- Fate: Laid up in the, National Defense Reserve Fleet, Astoria, Oregon, 22 September 1948; Sold for scrapping, 14 August 1967, removed from fleet, 31 August 1967

General characteristics
- Class & type: Liberty ship; type EC2-S-C1, standard
- Tonnage: 10,865 LT DWT; 7,176 GRT
- Displacement: 3,380 long tons (3,434 t) (light); 14,245 long tons (14,474 t) (max)
- Length: 441 feet 6 inches (135 m) oa; 416 feet (127 m) pp; 427 feet (130 m) lwl
- Beam: 57 feet (17 m)
- Draft: 27 ft 9.25 in (8.4646 m)
- Installed power: 2 × Oil fired 450 °F (232 °C) boilers, operating at 220 psi (1,500 kPa); 2,500 hp (1,900 kW)
- Propulsion: 1 × triple-expansion steam engine, (manufactured by General Machinery Corp., Hamilton, Ohio); 1 × screw propeller
- Speed: 11.5 knots (21.3 km/h; 13.2 mph)
- Capacity: 562,608 cubic feet (15,931 m^{3}) (grain); 499,573 cubic feet (14,146 m^{3}) (bale)
- Complement: 38–62 USMM; 21–40 USNAG
- Armament: Varied by ship; Bow-mounted 3-inch (76 mm)/50-caliber gun; Stern-mounted 4-inch (102 mm)/50-caliber gun; 2–8 × single 20-millimeter (0.79 in) Oerlikon anti-aircraft (AA) cannons and/or, 2–8 × 37-millimeter (1.46 in) M1 AA guns

SS John Gorrie was a Liberty ship built in the United States during World War II. She was named after John Gorrie, an American physician, scientist, inventor of mechanical cooling, and humanitarian.

== Construction ==
John Gorrie was laid down on 29 August 1942, under a Maritime Commission (MARCOM) contract, MC hull 1194, by the St. Johns River Shipbuilding Company, Jacksonville, Florida; she was sponsored by Mrs. Denis J. O'Mahoney, the wife of the general manager of the St. John's River SB Co., she was launched on 27 March 1943.

== History ==
She was allocated to South Atlantic Steamship Company, on 24 May 1943. On 22 September 1948, she was laid up in the, National Defense Reserve Fleet, Astoria, Oregon. On 1 June 1954, she was withdrawn from the fleet to be loaded with grain under the "Grain Program 1954", she returned loaded with grain on 23 June 1954. She was again withdrawn from the fleet on 8 August 1957, to have the grain unloaded, she returned empty on 12 August 1957. She was sold for scrapping, on 14 August 1967, to Zidell Explorations, Inc., for $54,001. She was removed from the fleet on 31 August 1967.

== Bibliography ==
- "St. John's River Shipbuilding, Jacksonville FL". www.ShipbuildingHistory.com. 16 October 2010.
- Maritime Administration. "John Gorrie". Ship History Database Vessel Status Card. U.S. Department of Transportation, Maritime Administration.
- Davies, James (May 2004). "Specifications (As-Built)" (PDF). p. 23.
- "SS John Gorrie".
