= Memorial Park (Jacksonville) =

Public park in Jacksonville, Florida

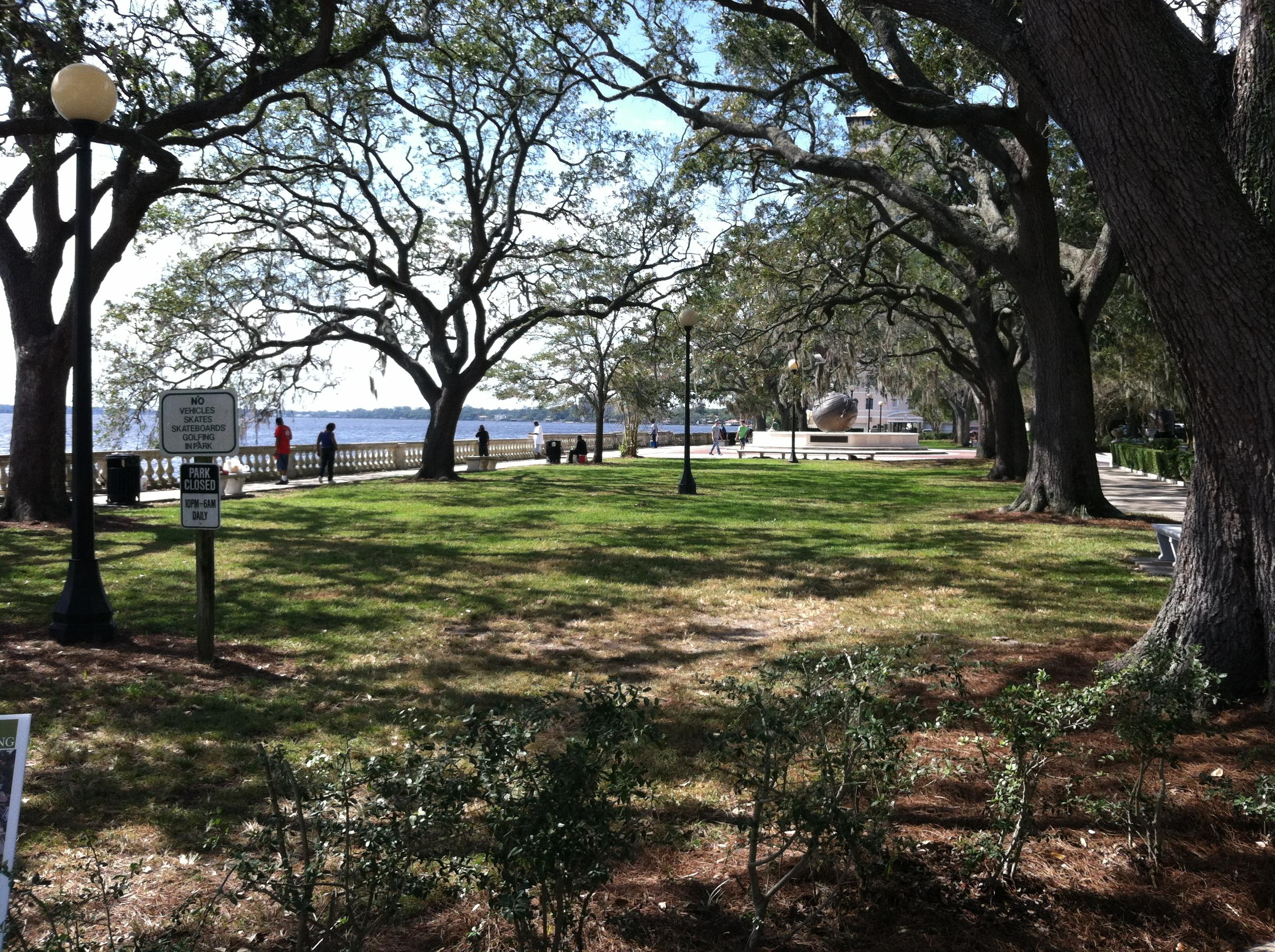
- Interactive map of Memorial Park
- Type: municipal
- Location: Jacksonville, Florida
- Coordinates: 30°18′38″N 81°40′46″W
- Area: 5.85 acres (2.37 ha)
- Created: 1919
- Designer: Olmsted Brothers
- Operator: Jacksonville
- Status: Open all year
- Memorial Park
- U.S. National Register of Historic Places
- NRHP reference No.: 100001389
- Added to NRHP: October 25, 2017

Memorial Park is a 5.85-acre (23,700 m^{2}) public park, located on the St. Johns River in Riverside, one of the most historic neighborhoods near downtown Jacksonville, Florida. It is the third-oldest park in the city, and was listed on the National Register of Historic Places in 2017.

== History ==
Memorial Park is situated on the north bank of the St. Johns River, bounded by Riverside Avenue. Shortly after World War I ended, the Rotary Club of Jacksonville suggested building a park in honor of the 1,200 Floridians who died in the conflict, and the following year, the City acquired the land.

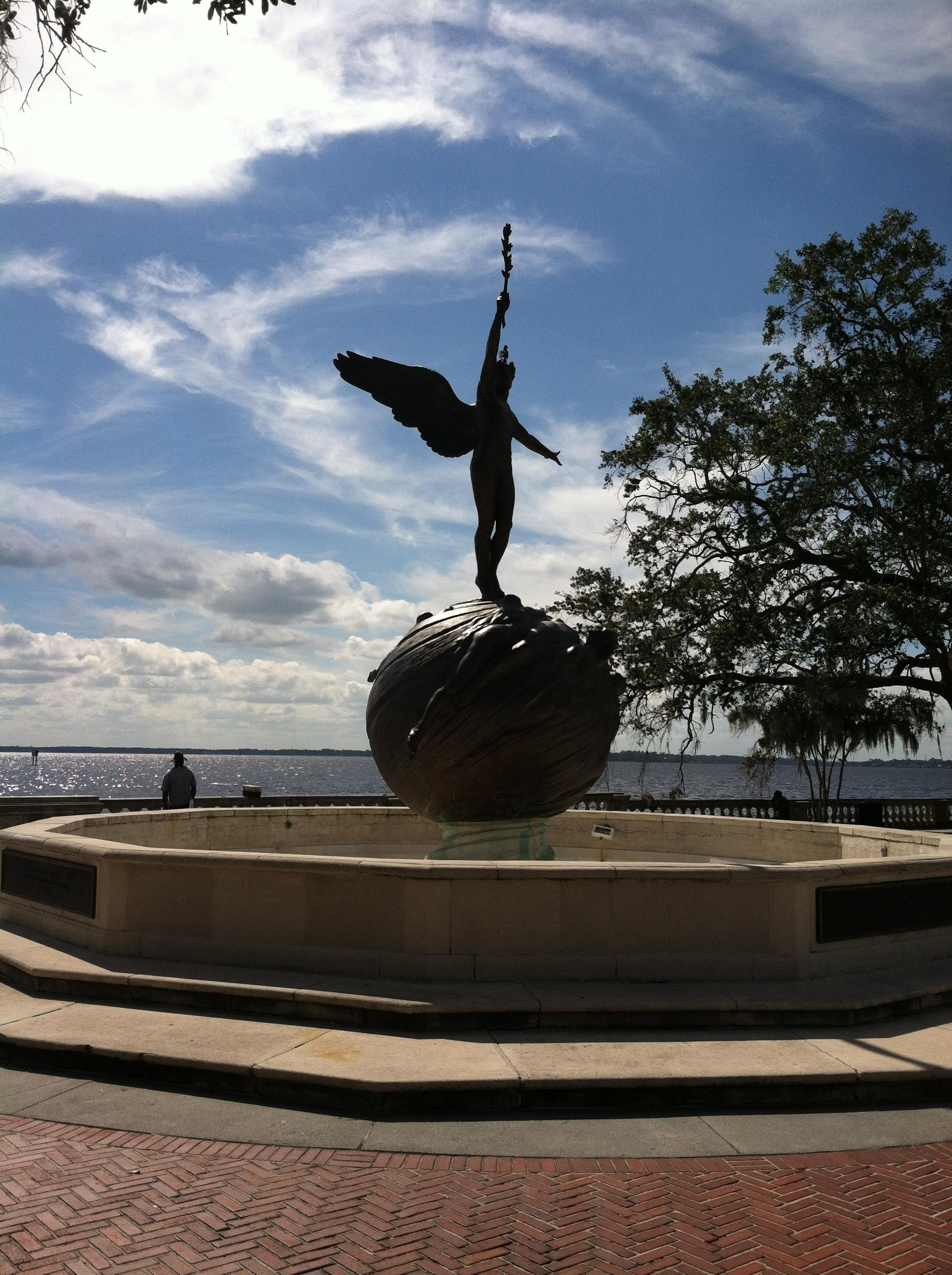
Pillar's bronze sculpture, "Spiritualized Life"

The park project was embraced by Jacksonville residents, and 31 civic groups were involved in raising money and planning. The Olmsted Brothers were commissioned to design the park. The firm also laid out the Biltmore Estate, several National Parks and numerous college campuses. They worked with a local architect, Roy A. Benjamin.

The bronze sculpture, "Spiritulized Life" is showcased, and was created by Charles Adrian Pillars, a First Coast resident for over a quarter century. Pillars was also responsible for the two works of art from Florida at the National Statuary Hall in Washington, D.C. The park, completed in 1924 and dedicated on Christmas Day, became Riverside's most popular location.

Charles Adrian Pillars created the "Spiritualized Life" sculpture in a Beaux Arts style "to tell a moving story of the true spirit of those who served in WWI." He added that he “desired this memorial to present the idea of life, its struggle and its victory.”

Pillars described "Spiritualized Life" as the depiction of a "young, winged male, forever racing the wind and holding aloft an olive branch of peace". Pillars further said the inspiration and meaning of the "Spiritualized Life" sculpture as follows:

"The bronze grouping was conceived in an effort to create some form of memorial which would be an eternal reminder of the boys who sacrificed themselves in the World War. I desired the memorial to present the idea of life, its struggle, and victory."

" While striving to make a composition visualizing this, I found a poem by Alan Seeger, a soldier- victim of the war. At once I saw the typical spirit of the boys who went overseas – saw with their eyes a world in the insane grip of greed and ambition, caught in the ceaseless swirl of selfishness, hate and covetousness, ever struggling against submergence. I saw these boys giving up their homes, sweethearts, wives and mothers to go overseas and through the supreme sacrifice make secure the happiness and safety of their loved ones. With this vivid picture in mind, I constructed a sphere to represent the world, engirdled with masses of swirling water typifying the chaotic earth forces. In this surging mass of waters, I shaped human figures, all striving to rise above this flood, struggling for mere existence. Last, surmounting these swirling waters, with their human freight, I placed the winged figure of Youth, representative of spiritual life, the spirit of these boys which was the spirit of victory. Immortality attained not through death, but deeds; not a victory of brute force, but of spirit. This figure of Youth Sacrificed wears his crown of laurels won. He holds aloft an olive branch, the emblem of peace."

A bronze plaque on one side of the fountain uses Pillars words with an inscription that reads, “Spiritualized Life - symbolized by the winged figure of youth - rises triumphantly from the swirl of war's chaos, which engulfs humanity and faces the future courageously.”

The Memorial Park Association (MPA) was founded in 1986 by Anne Freeman, and has worked to preserve the park for over a quarter century. High winds uprooted and toppled many trees in 1997, but city employees and MPA volunteers worked together to restore the park. Two 48-inch (1,200 mm) tall eagles, each sculpted in bronze, were donated by the MPA and dedicated on May 29, 2011. Their design was based on photographs of concrete statues originally installed when the park was opened. The artist was local sculptor Diane LaFond Insetta.

On 11 September 2017, the park flooded due to sea surge from Hurricane Irma. The balustrade along the seawall was destroyed. Again on 30 August 2023, the park was flooded due to sea surge, this time from Hurricane Idalia, and the balustrade was again partially destroyed.
