= John Gorrie Memorial Bridge =

Bridge in Florida, United States of America

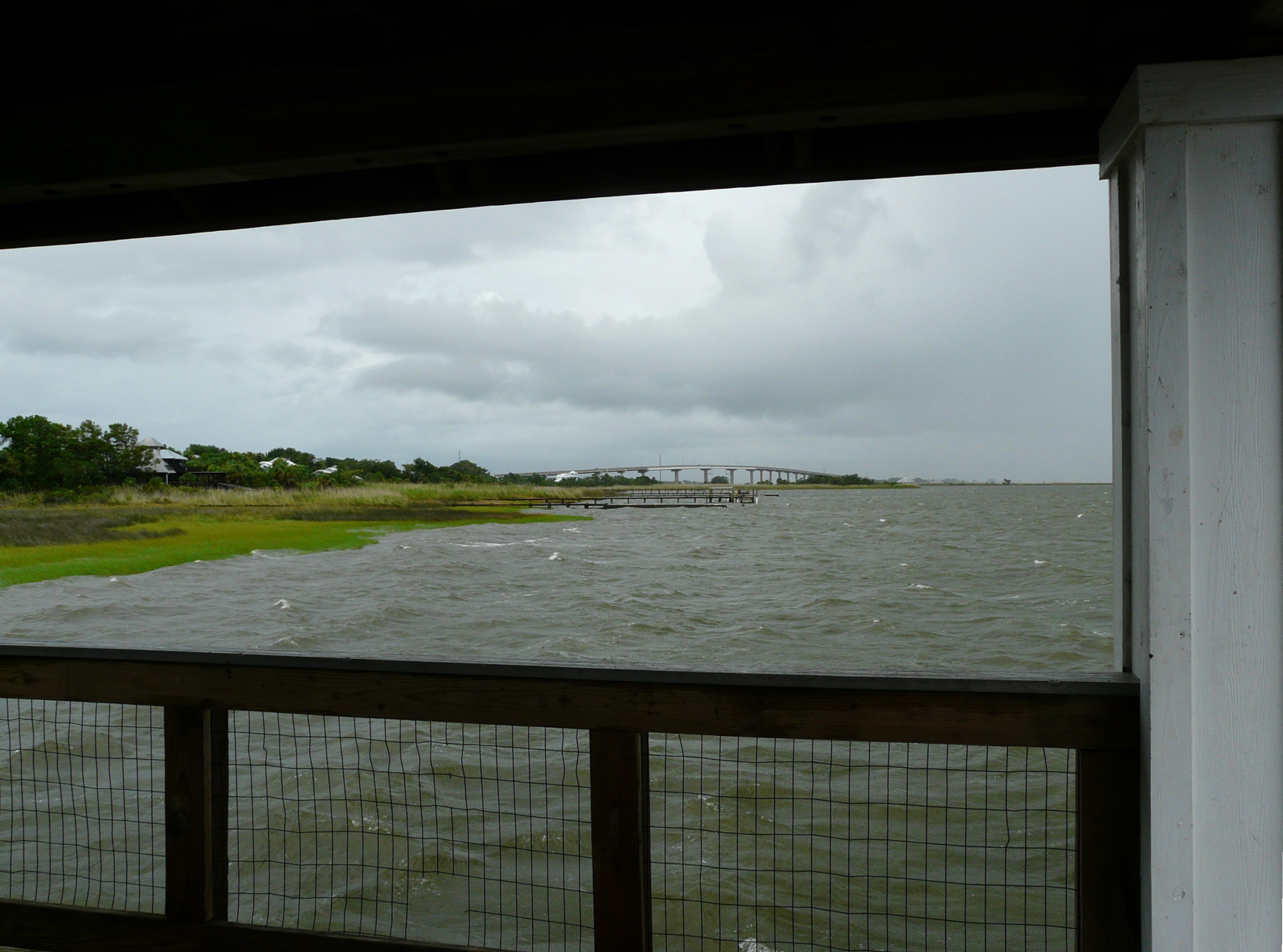
- Apalachicola Bay, with the John Gorrie Bridge in the background.
- Coordinates: 29°43′48″N 84°56′22″W
- Carries: US 98 / US 319 / SR 30
- Crosses: Apalachicola Bay
- Locale: Apalachicola, Florida
- Named for: John Gorrie

Characteristics
- Total length: 13,200 feet (4,000 meters)

History
- Opened: November 11, 1935
- Rebuilt: 1988

Location
- Interactive map of John Gorrie Memorial Bridge

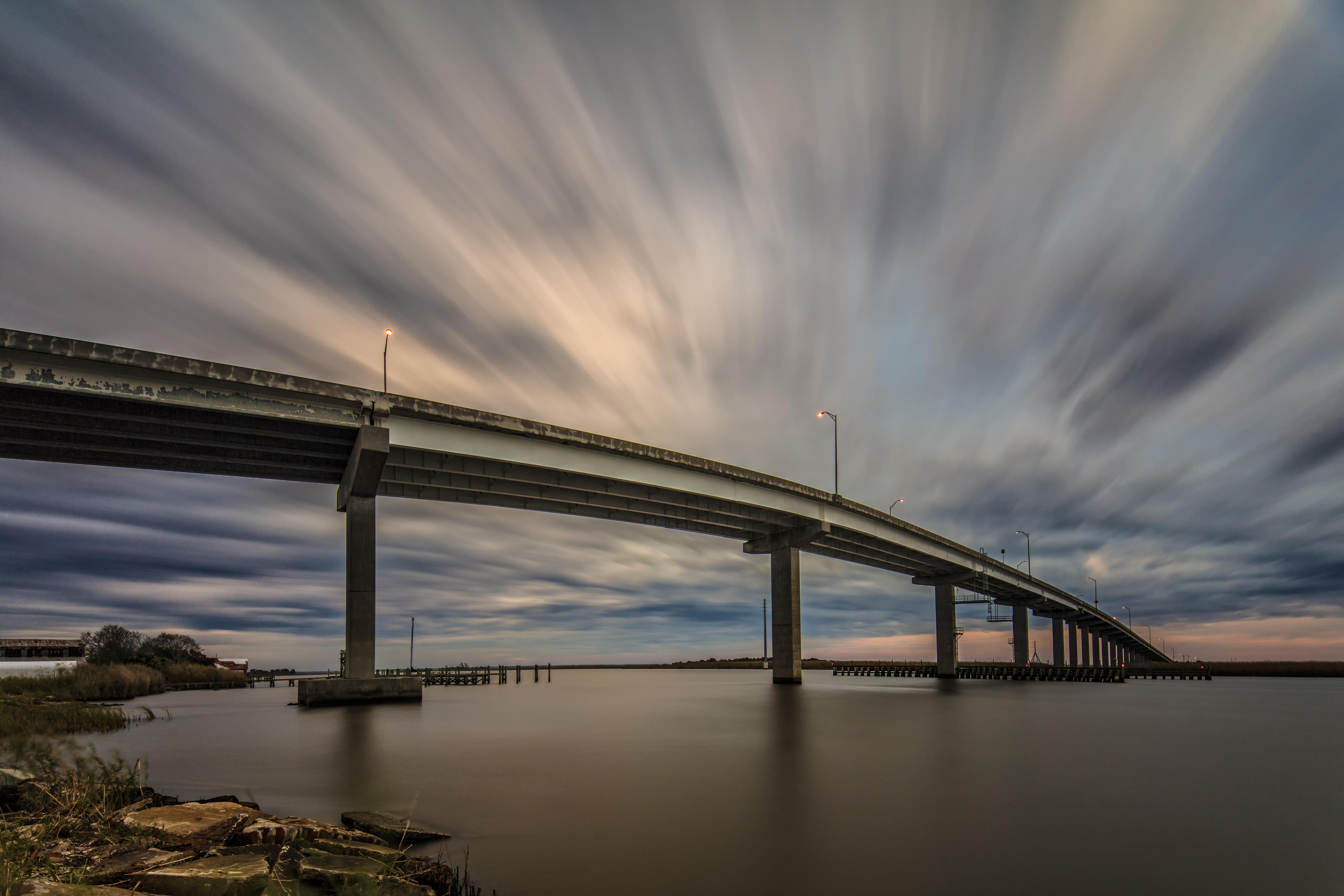
John Gorrie Memorial Bridge

The John Gorrie Bridge carries US 98 and US 319 over the Apalachicola Bay. It connects Apalachicola, Florida, with Eastpoint, Florida. The original John Gorrie Bridge was built in 1935, replacing a ferry service between the two towns. It included a rotating section to allow passage of ships with high masts. The current bridge was built in 1988.

== Dedication ==
The Gorrie Bridge Opening Celebration was held on Armistice Day, November 11, 1935. Florida Governor David Sholtz cut the ribbon to officially open what was referred to as the Florida West Coast Scenic Highway.
