= John Gorrie Museum State Park =

State park in Florida, United States

John Gorrie State Museum
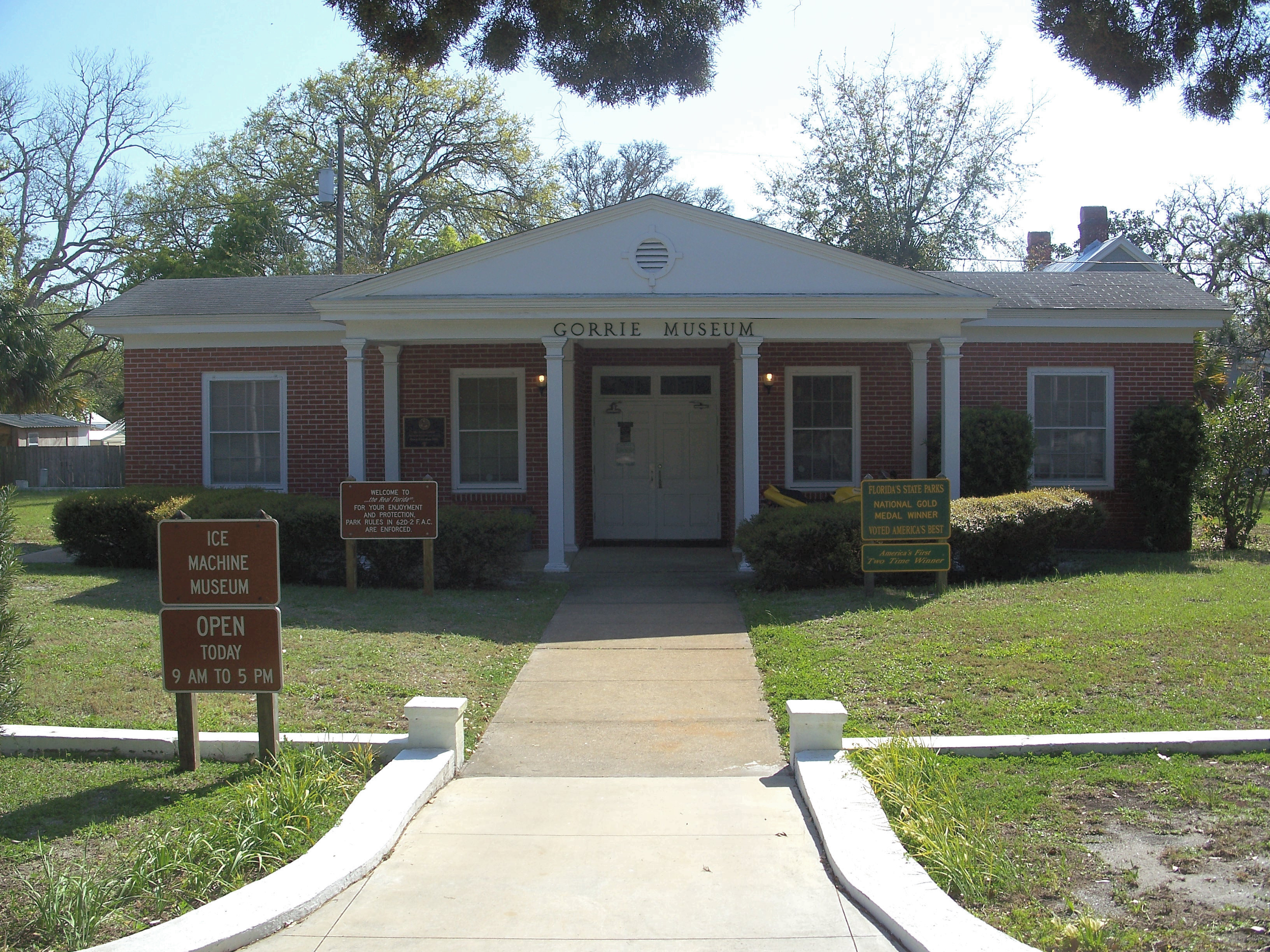

- Location within Florida Location within the United States
- Interactive map of John Gorrie State Museum
- Location: Apalachicola, Franklin County, Florida, USA
- Coordinates: 29.7254505550414°N 84.98547170307897°W
- Governing body: Florida Department of Environmental Protection

The John Gorrie State Museum is a Florida State Park located in Apalachicola, a block off U.S. 98. It commemorates the man who was a pioneer in developing air conditioning, receiving the first U.S. Patent for mechanical refrigeration in 1851. The address is 46 Sixth Street.

== Recreational activities ==
The museum features exhibits about Apalachicola and the life and inventions of John Gorrie. A three-quarter-scale replica of his ice-making machine is on display.

== Admission and hours ==
The visitor center is open from 9:00 a.m. until 5:00 p.m. Thursday through Monday. The center is closed on Thanksgiving, Christmas and New Years Day. There is a $2.00 per person entrance fee.
