= Statue of Edmund Kirby Smith =

Statue formerly at the U.S. Capitol

Edmund Kirby Smith
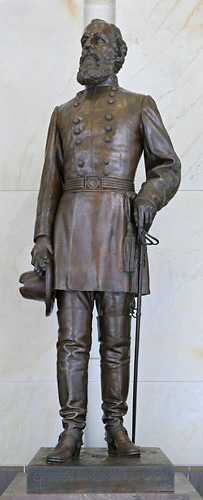
- The statue was in the National Statuary Hall Collection from 1922 to 2021
- Artist: C. Adrian Pillars
- Medium: Bronze sculpture
- Subject: Edmund Kirby Smith
- Location: formerly in Washington, D.C., United States, currently location not known

Edmund Kirby Smith is a bronze sculpture commemorating the Confederate officer of the same name by C. Adrian Pillars that was installed in the United States Capitol Visitor Center as part of the National Statuary Hall Collection from 1922 to 2021. The statue was gifted by the state of Florida in 1922.

Smith, who died in 1893, was the last surviving General of the Confederate States Army, as well as the last surviving full General from either side of the American Civil War. After he died, his family changed their name to Kirby-Smith to help “distinguish him from the other Civil War 'General Smiths,'" of which there were approximately 35.

At the statue's unveiling in Congress, Representative William J. Sears quoted a resolution from the Confederate States Congress that praised Kirby Smith's “justice, his firmness and moderation, his integrity and conscientious regard for law, his unaffected kindness to the people, the protection of their rights and the redress of their wrongs, and has thus won the confidence of [the Confederate] Congress.”

On March 19, 2018, Governor Rick Scott signed legislation replacing the statue with one of African-American educator and civil rights activist Mary McLeod Bethune. On September 4, 2021, the statue was removed from the U.S. Capitol. The replacement statue of Bethune was unveiled at the U.S. Capitol on July 13, 2022.

The fate of the statue of Smith, once removed, has been much discussed, and as of August 2020 remains unresolved. His birthplace, St. Augustine, does not want it. The statue was to have been moved to the Lake County Historical Museum, in Tavares, Florida, but there has been significant local opposition. Smith never lived in Lake County; at the time Smith was born Lake County was part of St. Johns County, whose county seat is St. Augustine. On July 7, 2020, Lake County commissioners voted 4–1 against accepting the monument. In September 2021, the Tampa Bay Times reported plans of having the statue temporarily stored at the Museum of Florida History out of public display until a permanent home is found.

== See also ==
- 1922 in art
- List of Confederate monuments and memorials
- Removal of Confederate monuments and memorials
