= Statue of John Gorrie =

Statue in the United States Capitol

John Gorrie
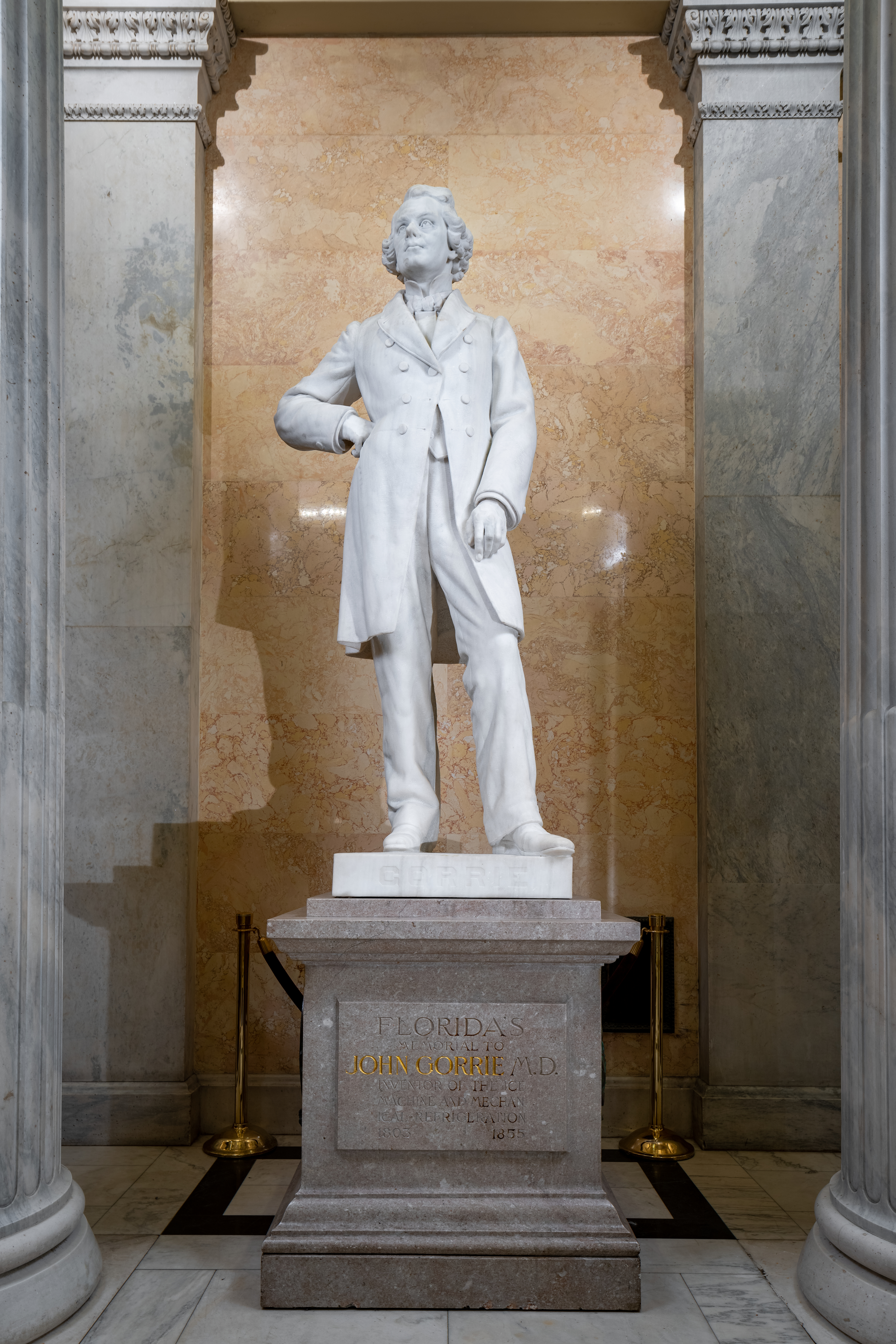
- The statue in the Hall of Columns in 2023
- Artist: C. Adrian Pillars
- Medium: Marble sculpture
- Subject: John Gorrie
- Location: Washington, D.C., United States

John Gorrie is a marble sculpture depicting the American inventor and scientist of the same name by C. Adrian Pillars, installed at the United States Capitol in Washington, D.C., as part of the National Statuary Hall Collection. The statue was gifted by the U.S. state of Florida in 1914.

John B. Gorrie (1803–1855) was a Nevis-born American medical doctor and scientist, credited as the inventor of mechanical refrigeration. The marble sculpture depicts Gorrie standing in a natural pose. The statue was carved from Carrara marble and rests on a granite base. It measures 7.5 feet (228.6 cm) in height. The work reflects early 20th-century American neoclassical sculptural tradition.

== See also ==
- 1914 in art
