= Nancy Kenaston =

British journalist (1920–2012)

- Nancy Kenaston, from a 1980 newspaper.
- Born: Nancy Margaret Shields; 20 January 1920; Kent, England
- Died: 11 August 2012 (aged 92); Fort Walton Beach, Florida, US
- Occupations: Journalist, editor, public relations
- Known for: Court reporter at the Nuremberg trials after World War II

Nancy Margaret Shields Kenaston (20 January 1920 – 11 August 2012) was a British journalist, and a court reporter at the Nuremberg trials after World War II. In her later years in the United States, she spoke to school and community groups about the trials.

== Early life ==
Nancy Shields was born in Kent, the daughter of Herbert Fredrick Henry Shields and Edith Muriel Walterman Shields. Her parents were involved in politics, and knew Winston Churchill. In the 1930s she took courses in shorthand and trained as a typist and bookkeeper in London. She began courses in journalism before the war.

== Career ==
During World War II, Shields was a member of the Auxiliary Territorial Service, trained to identify German aircraft; she operated an anti-aircraft battery on the Thames for three years. She also worked as a reporter for the Bath Chronicle newspaper, and was a British civilian volunteer with the United States Air Force (USAF) after 1941. She was assigned by the USAF as a court reporter at the Nuremberg trials. "When I arrived there for the trials, I saw streets filled with piles of debris three stories high," Kenaston recalled later.

After the war, Kenaston was managing editor at a small local newspaper in Fort Walton Beach, Florida. She was also director of public relations for the Okaloosa County School Board, a boating safety instructor with the US Coast Guard, and legislative aide to state representative Jerry Melvin. She was president of the Panhandle Animal Welfare Society and a member of the Okaloosa County Planning Commission. She was inducted into the Okaloosa County Women's Hall of Fame in 1999.

Kenaston wrote two local histories, From Cabin to Campus: A History of the Okaloosa County School System (1977) and The Rich Heritage of Fort Walton Beach and the Communities of the Emerald Coast (1999). In 2009, she wrote a memoir, When Fate Steps In. She spoke to community groups about her memories of World War II and its aftermath. "I feel very deeply that it is important to remember what happened there," she explained.

== Personal life ==
Nancy Shields married USAF colonel Hampton Ray Kenaston Jr., a widower with three children, in 1946. They lived in Florida. She was widowed when Kenaston died in 1969, and she died at Fort Walton Beach, in 2012, aged 92 years.
