= Apalachicola, Florida =

- City
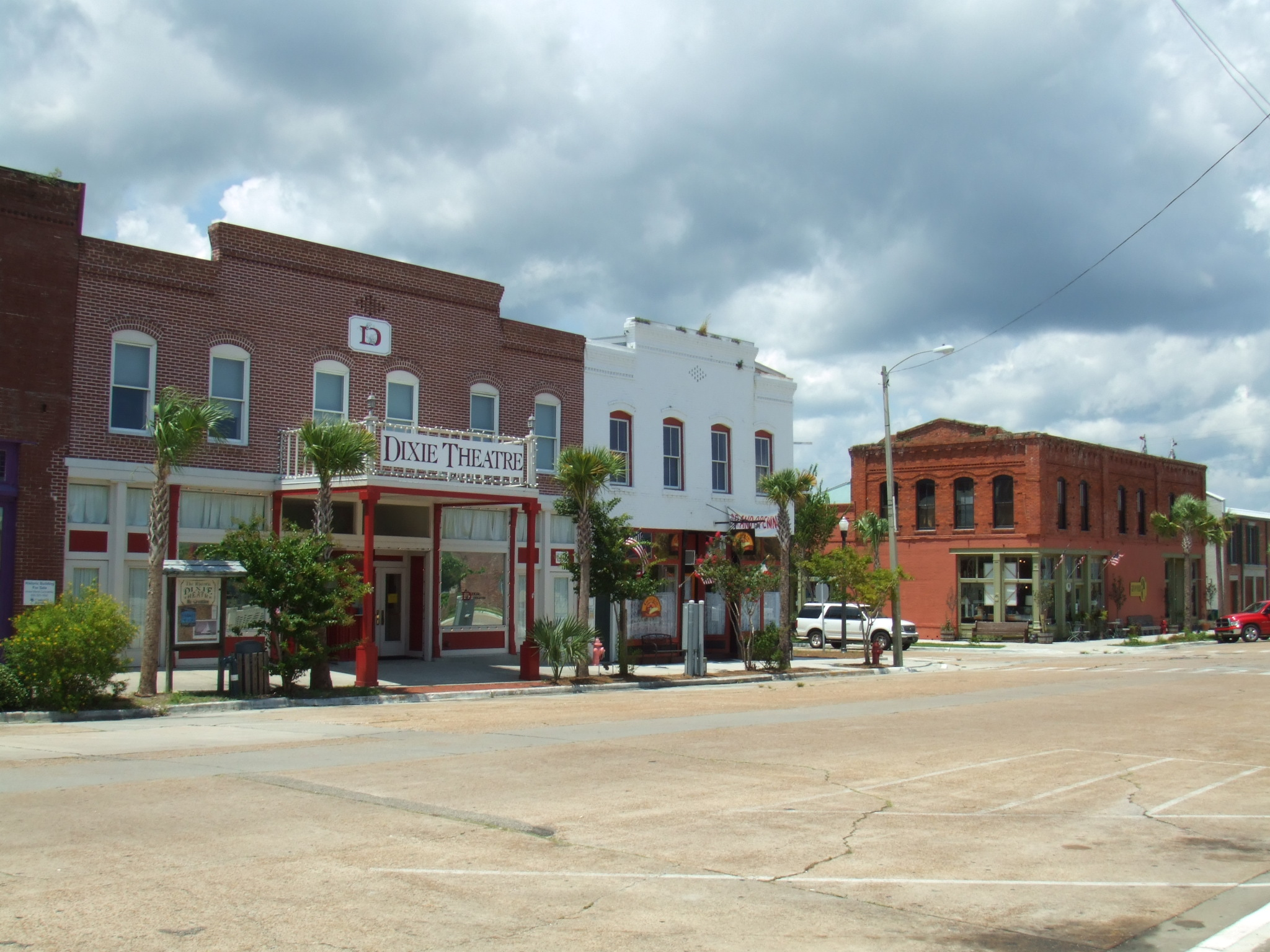
- Dixie Theatre (2008)

- Seal

- Location within Franklin County and Florida
- Coordinates: 29°43′40″N 84°59′48″W
- Country: United States
- State: Florida
- County: Franklin
- Settled (Apalachicola): c. 1705-1763
- Settled (Cottonton): c. 1763-1783
- Incorporated (Town of West Point): 1828
- Incorporated (City of Apalachicola): 1831

Government
  - Type: Mayor–Commission
  - Mayor: Brenda Ash
  - Commissioners: Despina George, Adriane Elliott, Donna Duncan, and Donna Knutson
  - City Manager: Charles V. Anderson
  - City Clerk: Sheneidra K. Cummings
  - City Attorney: Daniel W. Hartman

Area
  - Total: 2.63 sq mi (6.80 km^{2})
  - Land: 1.93 sq mi (4.99 km^{2})
  - Water: 0.70 sq mi (1.81 km^{2})
- Elevation: 16 ft (4.9 m)

Population (2020)
  - Total: 2,341
  - Density: 1,216.3/sq mi (469.61/km^{2})
- Time zone: UTC−5 (Eastern (EST))
  - Summer (DST): UTC−4 (EDT)
- ZIP codes: 32320, 32329
- Area code(s): 850, 448
- FIPS code: 12-01625
- GNIS ID: 2403102
- Website: cityofapalachicola.com

Apalachicola (/ˌæpəlætʃɪˈkoʊlə/ AP-ə-lach-i-KOH-lə) is a city and the county seat of Franklin County, Florida, United States, on the shore of Apalachicola Bay, an inlet of the Gulf of Mexico. The population was 2,341 at the 2020 US census.

== History ==
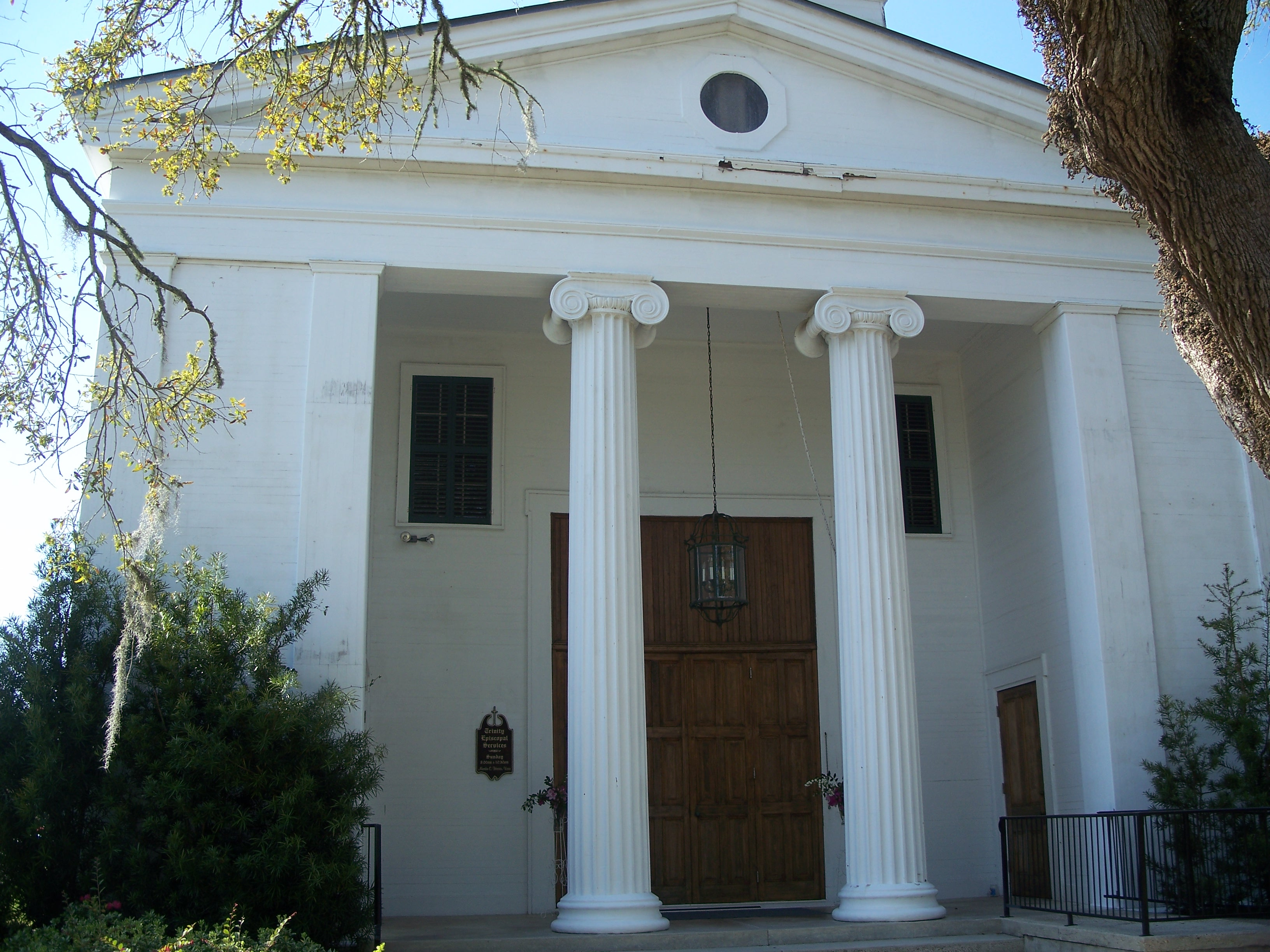
Trinity Episcopal Church

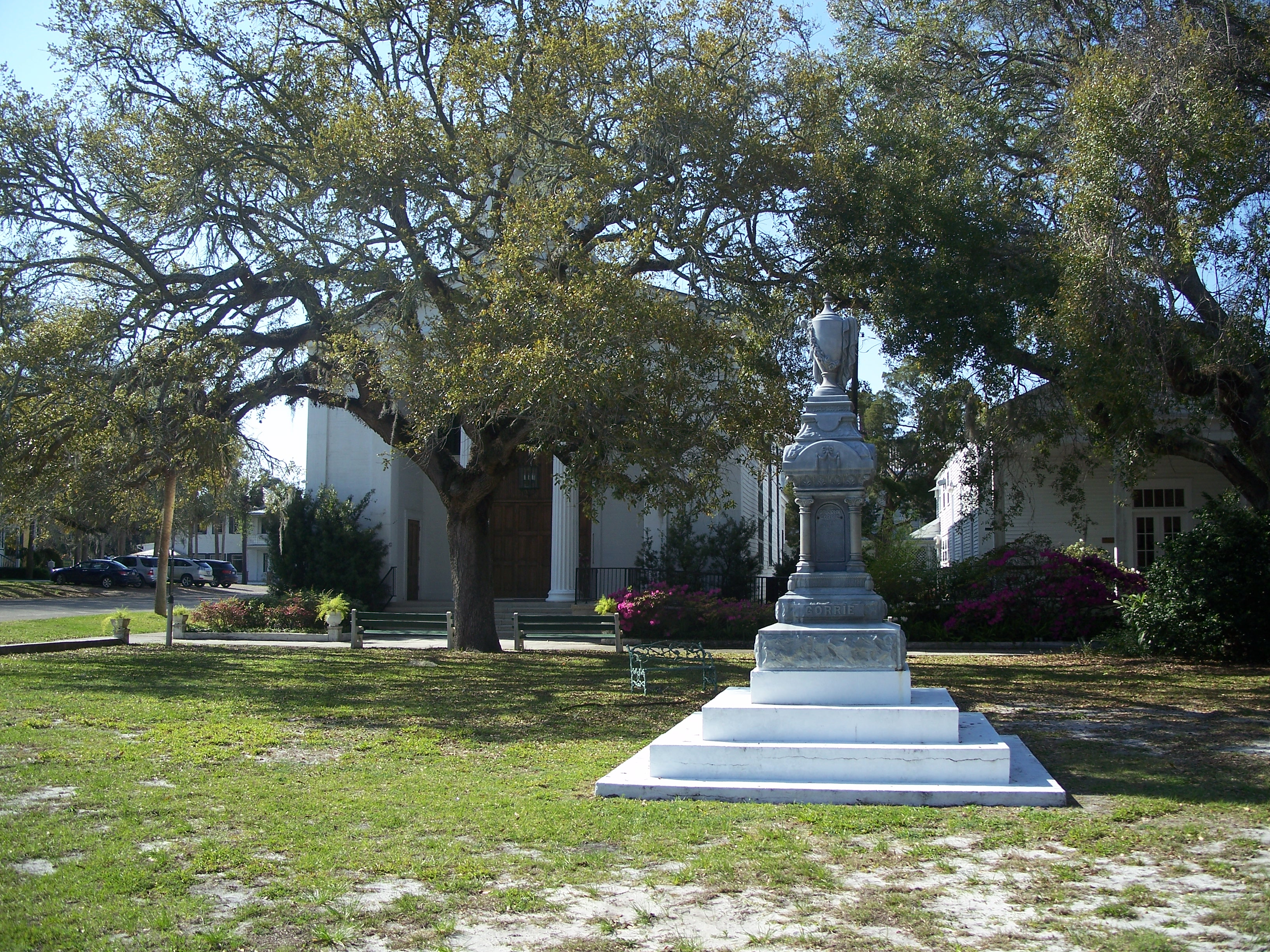
John Gorrie Monument, located in Gorrie Square, with Trinity Episcopal Church in the background

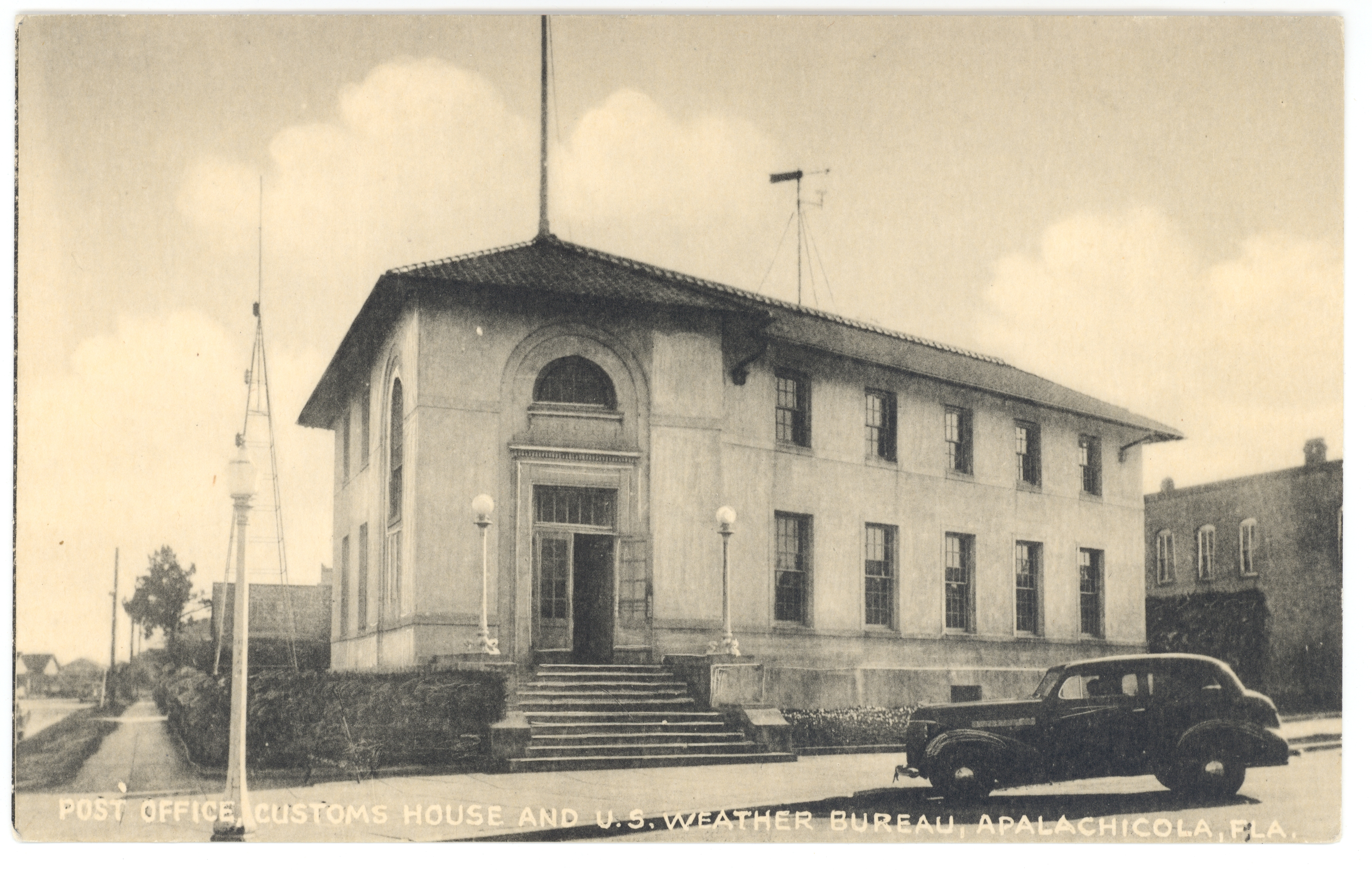
Post Office, Customs house, and weather bureau, c. 1935

The Apalachicola Province, after whom the river and, ultimately the city, are named, was located along the lower part of the Chattahoochee River in Alabama and Georgia in the 17th century, when the Spanish included the Chattahoochee as part of the Apalachicola River. The name is a combination of the Hitchiti words apalahchi, meaning "on the other side", and okli, meaning "people". In original reference to the settlement, it probably meant "people on the other side of the river".

Between the years 1513 and 1763, the area that now includes the city of Apalachicola was under Spanish jurisdiction as part of Spanish Florida. While the Spanish established missions with the Apalachee people to the northeast of the city of Apalachicola (centered around Tallahassee), and with the Chatot people to the north in the upper Apalachicola River valley and the Chipola River valley, the Spanish did not establish any missions in the area of the lower Apalachicola River during the duration of Spain's first occupation of Florida. The earliest-known settlement by non-indigenous people was in 1705, when the Spanish built a fort in the area. In the 1750s, during the French and Indian War, the British captured the Spanish colony of Cuba; however, because Cuba was a prized possession for the Spanish, and Florida was mostly unused backwater, the Spanish traded Florida to the British in return for regaining Cuba. Between the years 1763 and 1783, the area that is now Apalachicola fell under the jurisdiction of British West Florida. A British trading post called "Cottonton" was founded at this site on the mouth of the Apalachicola River. In 1783, British West Florida was transferred to Spain; however, the trading post (and its British inhabitants) remained and continued facilitating trade along the Apalachicola River (which was connected to the trading network along the Chattahoochee River). Gradually, after the acquisition of the Florida Territory by the United States and related development in Alabama and Georgia, it attracted more permanent European-American residents. In 1828, it was officially incorporated as the "Town of West Point". It was renamed the "City of Apalachicola" in 1831, by an act of the Legislative Council of the Territory of Florida.

Trinity Episcopal Church was incorporated by an act of the Legislative Council of the Territory of Florida on February 11, 1837. The building was one of the earliest prefabricated buildings in the United States. The framework was shipped by schooner from New York City and assembled in Apalachicola with wooden pegs.

In 1837, a newspaper at Apalachicola boasted that the town's business street along the waterfront "had 2,000 feet [610 meters] of continuous brick stores, three stories high, 80 feet [24 meters] deep, and all equipped with granite pillars."

Botanist Alvan Wentworth Chapman settled in Apalachicola in 1847. In 1860, he published his major work, "Flora of the Southern United States". An elementary school was later named in his honor.

On April 3, 1862, during the American Civil War, the gunboat USS Sagamore and the steamer USS Mercedita (relieving the USS Marion) captured Apalachicola. Union forces that occupied West Florida during much of the war moved here.

In 1849, Apalachicola physician John Gorrie discovered the cold-air process of refrigeration and patented an ice machine in 1850. He had experimented to find ways to lower the body temperature of fever patients. His patent laid the groundwork for development of modern refrigeration and air conditioning, making Florida and the South more livable year-round. The city has a monument to him, and a replica of his ice machine is on display in the John Gorrie Museum. The John Gorrie Memorial Bridge, carrying the main road out of Apalachicola, U.S. 98, is named for him.

Before railroads reached the region in the later 19th century, Apalachicola was the third-busiest port on the Gulf of Mexico (behind New Orleans and Mobile). Scheduled boats transported passengers and goods up and down the Apalachicola, Chattahoochee, and Flint rivers to Albany and Columbus, Georgia. A paddle steamer, the Crescent City, made a daily round trip to Carrabelle carrying the mail as well as passengers and freight.

The AN Railway, formerly the Apalachicola Northern Railroad, serves the city.

Originally built in 1935 and rebuilt in 1988, the John Gorrie Memorial Bridge carries U.S. 98 across Apalachicola Bay to Eastpoint.

== Geography ==
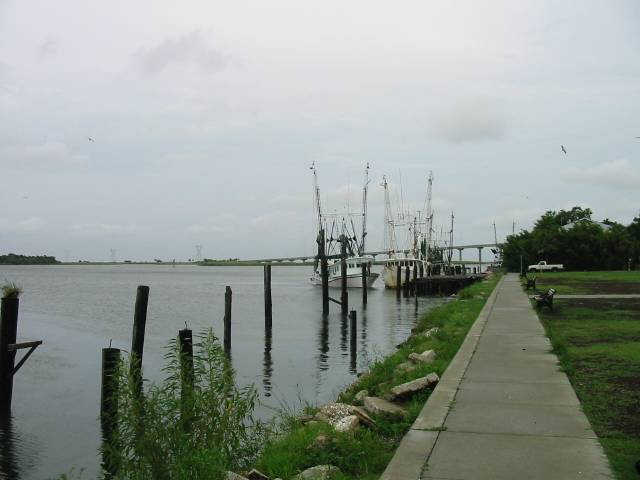
The mouth of the Apalachicola River, looking towards Apalachicola Bay

Apalachicola is located in the northwestern part of the state on Apalachicola Bay and at the mouth of the Apalachicola River. U.S. 98 is the main highway through town, leading east across the bay to Eastpoint and northwest 59 miles (95 km) to Panama City. Tallahassee, the state capital, is 75 miles (121 km) to the northeast via U.S. 98 and U.S. 319.

According to the United States Census Bureau, the city has a total area of 2.6 square miles (6.8 km^{2}), of which 1.9 square miles (5.0 km^{2}) is land and 0.69 square miles (1.8 km^{2}), or 26.67%, is water.

=== Climate ===
The climate of Apalachicola is humid subtropical (Köppen Cfa), with short, mild winters and hot, humid summers. The hottest temperature ever recorded in the city was 103 °F (39 °C) on August 15, 1995, and the coldest temperature ever recorded was 9 °F (−13 °C) on January 21, 1985.

Climate data for Apalachicola, Florida (Apalachicola Regional Airport), 1991–2020 normals, extremes 1975–present
Month	Jan	Feb	Mar	Apr	May	Jun	Jul	Aug	Sep	Oct	Nov	Dec	Year
Record high °F (°C)	80 (27)	82 (28)	90 (32)	89 (32)	98 (37)	100 (38)	102 (39)	103 (39)	98 (37)	92 (33)	89 (32)	91 (33)	103 (39)
Mean maximum °F (°C)	75.1 (23.9)	76.6 (24.8)	81.3 (27.4)	84.3 (29.1)	91.6 (33.1)	94.3 (34.6)	95.7 (35.4)	95.2 (35.1)	92.1 (33.4)	88.3 (31.3)	82.3 (27.9)	77.0 (25.0)	97.1 (36.2)
Mean daily maximum °F (°C)	63.7 (17.6)	66.3 (19.1)	70.9 (21.6)	76.3 (24.6)	83.7 (28.7)	88.5 (31.4)	89.7 (32.1)	89.4 (31.9)	86.7 (30.4)	80.7 (27.1)	72.5 (22.5)	66.0 (18.9)	77.9 (25.5)
Daily mean °F (°C)	54.0 (12.2)	56.8 (13.8)	61.7 (16.5)	67.3 (19.6)	74.8 (23.8)	80.7 (27.1)	82.2 (27.9)	82.2 (27.9)	79.2 (26.2)	71.5 (21.9)	62.1 (16.7)	56.5 (13.6)	69.1 (20.6)
Mean daily minimum °F (°C)	44.4 (6.9)	47.4 (8.6)	52.5 (11.4)	58.2 (14.6)	65.9 (18.8)	72.8 (22.7)	74.7 (23.7)	75.0 (23.9)	71.6 (22.0)	62.3 (16.8)	51.7 (10.9)	47.1 (8.4)	60.3 (15.7)
Mean minimum °F (°C)	27.5 (−2.5)	30.7 (−0.7)	36.0 (2.2)	43.7 (6.5)	53.3 (11.8)	66.4 (19.1)	70.3 (21.3)	70.1 (21.2)	61.2 (16.2)	45.4 (7.4)	35.4 (1.9)	31.7 (−0.2)	25.6 (−3.6)
Record low °F (°C)	9 (−13)	20 (−7)	22 (−6)	36 (2)	47 (8)	48 (9)	63 (17)	62 (17)	52 (11)	33 (1)	27 (−3)	14 (−10)	9 (−13)
Average precipitation inches (mm)	4.06 (103)	4.17 (106)	4.34 (110)	2.91 (74)	1.87 (47)	5.86 (149)	5.74 (146)	7.79 (198)	5.38 (137)	3.63 (92)	3.74 (95)	3.59 (91)	53.08 (1,348)
Average precipitation days (≥ 0.01 in)	9.8	8.8	7.9	6.5	5.7	11.1	15.0	15.3	11.5	7.8	8.9	10.1	118.4
Mean monthly sunshine hours	187.7	188.1	250.8	296.8	327.9	304.8	278.6	262.6	251.8	261.2	212.8	187.8	3,010.9
Source: NOAA (sun 1961–1990)

== Demographics ==
Historical population
Census	Pop.	Note	%±
1860	1,904		—
1870	1,129		−40.7%
1880	1,336		18.3%
1890	2,727		104.1%
1900	3,077		12.8%
1910	3,065		−0.4%
1920	3,066		0.0%
1930	3,150		2.7%
1940	3,268		3.7%
1950	3,222		−1.4%
1960	3,099		−3.8%
1970	3,102		0.1%
1980	2,565		−17.3%
1990	2,602		1.4%
2000	2,334		−10.3%
2010	2,231		−4.4%
2020	2,341		4.9%
U.S. Decennial Census

=== Racial and ethnic composition ===
Apalachicola racial composition (Hispanics excluded from racial categories) (NH = Non-Hispanic)
Race	Pop 2010	Pop 2020	% 2010	% 2020
White (NH)	1,425	1,442	63.87%	61.60%
Black or African American (NH)	589	607	26.40%	25.93%
Native American or Alaska Native (NH)	10	7	0.45%	0.30%
Asian (NH)	7	6	0.31%	0.26%
Pacific Islander or Native Hawaiian (NH)	1	0	0.04%	0.00%
Some other race (NH)	2	7	0.09%	0.30%
Two or more races/Multiracial (NH)	49	88	2.20%	3.76%
Hispanic or Latino (any race)	148	184	6.63%	7.86%
Total	2,231	2,341		

=== 2020 census ===
As of the 2020 census, Apalachicola had a population of 2,341. The median age was 50.5 years. 18.4% of residents were under the age of 18 and 29.4% of residents were 65 years of age or older. For every 100 females there were 85.8 males, and for every 100 females age 18 and over there were 82.9 males age 18 and over.

0.0% of residents lived in urban areas, while 100.0% lived in rural areas.

There were 1,089 households in Apalachicola, of which 22.6% had children under the age of 18 living in them. Of all households, 36.5% were married-couple households, 20.3% were households with a male householder and no spouse or partner present, and 37.7% were households with a female householder and no spouse or partner present. About 34.9% of all households were made up of individuals and 18.5% had someone living alone who was 65 years of age or older.

There were 1,391 housing units, of which 21.7% were vacant. The homeowner vacancy rate was 3.3% and the rental vacancy rate was 8.3%.

According to the United States Census Bureau's 2020 American Community Survey 5-year estimates, there were 669 families residing in the city.

=== 2010 census ===
As of the 2010 United States census, there were 2,231 people, 1,123 households, and 644 families residing in the city.

=== 2000 census ===
As of the census of 2000, there were 2,334 people, 1,006 households, and 608 families residing in the city. The population density was 1,242.1 inhabitants per square mile (479.6/km^{2}). There were 1,207 housing units at an average density of 642.3 per square mile (248.0/km^{2}). The racial makeup of the city was 63.41% White, 34.92% African American, 0.17% Native American, 0.39% Asian, 0.47% from other races, and 0.64% from two or more races. Hispanic or Latino of any race were 1.67% of the population.

In 2000, there were 1,006 households, out of which 23.4% had children under the age of 18 living with them, 41.8% were married couples living together, 15.0% had a female householder with no husband present, and 39.5% were non-families. Of all households, 34.7% were made up of individuals, and 14.8% had someone living alone who was 65 years of age or older. The average household size was 2.24 and the average family size was 2.87.

In 2000, in the city, the population was spread out, with 21.9% under the age of 18, 7.0% from 18 to 24, 24.0% from 25 to 44, 26.7% from 45 to 64, and 20.5% who were 65 years of age or older. The median age was 43 years. For every 100 females, there were 90.2 males. For every 100 females age 18 and over, there were 86.3 males.

In 2000, the median income for a household in the city was $23,073, and the median income for a family was $28,464. Males had a median income of $22,500 versus $18,750 for females. The per capita income for the city was $12,227. About 19.9% of families and 25.3% of the population were below the poverty line, including 32.4% of those under age 18 and 15.0% of those age 65 or over.

== Economy ==
Apalachicola is still the home port for a variety of seafood workers, including recreational fishing and shrimpers. More than 90% of Florida's oyster farm production was harvested from Apalachicola Bay in past years. However, in 2018, the Florida Fish and Wildlife Conservation Commission (due to pollution and a lack of water flow in the Apalachicola River) imposed requirements that caused the complete collapse of the industry. Every year the town hosts the Florida Seafood Festival. The bay is well protected by St. Vincent Island, Flag Island, Sand Island, St. George Island, and Cape St. George Island.

In 1979, Exxon relocated their experimental subsea production system from offshore Louisiana to a permitted artificial reef site off Apalachicola. This was the first effort to turn an oil platform into an artificial reef.

== Arts and culture ==
Apalachicola is home to the Dixie Theatre, a professional Equity theater which is also a live performance venue. Built in 1912, the theatre was fully renovated beginning in 1996.

== Education ==
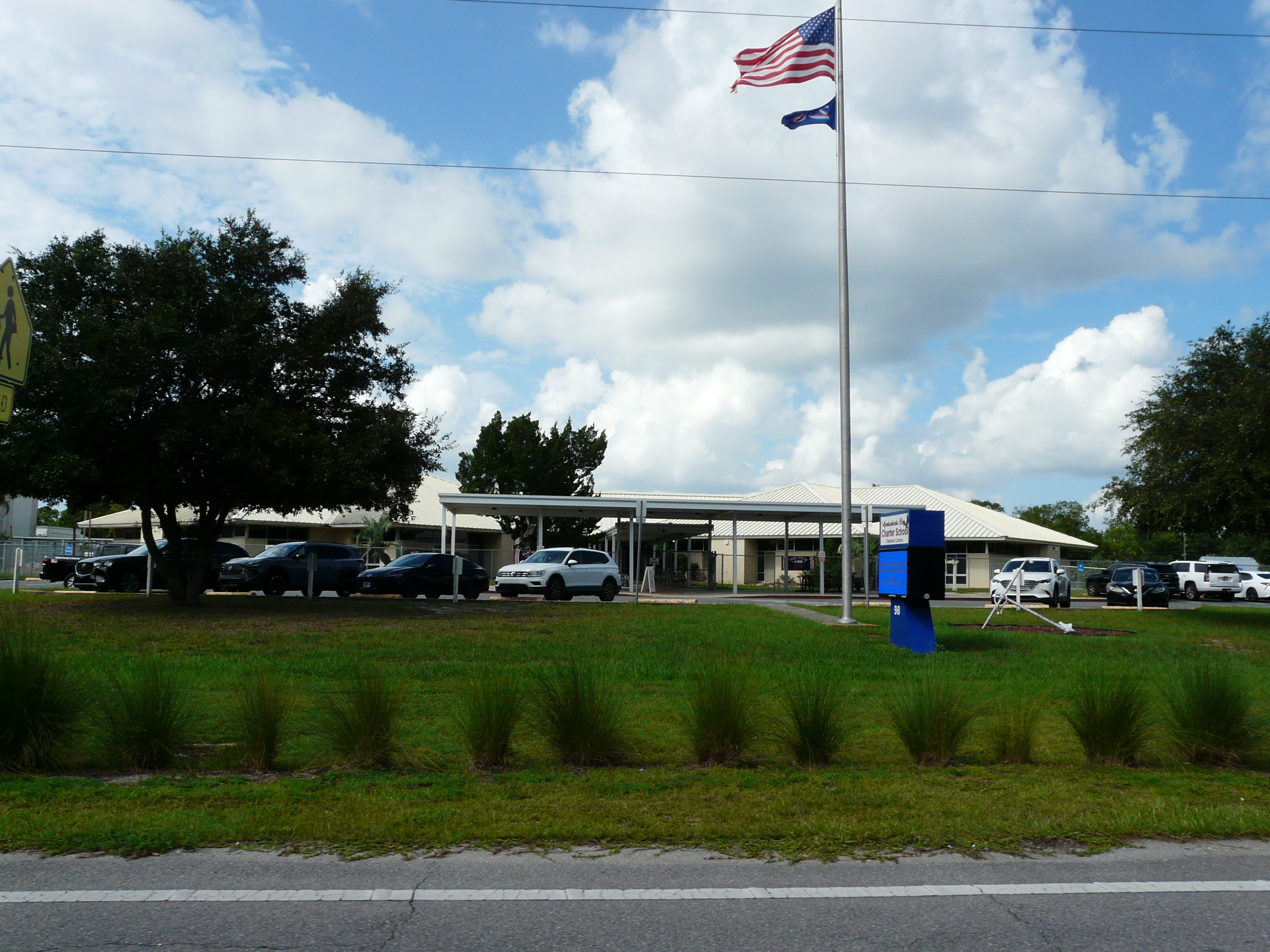
Apalachicola Bay Charter School

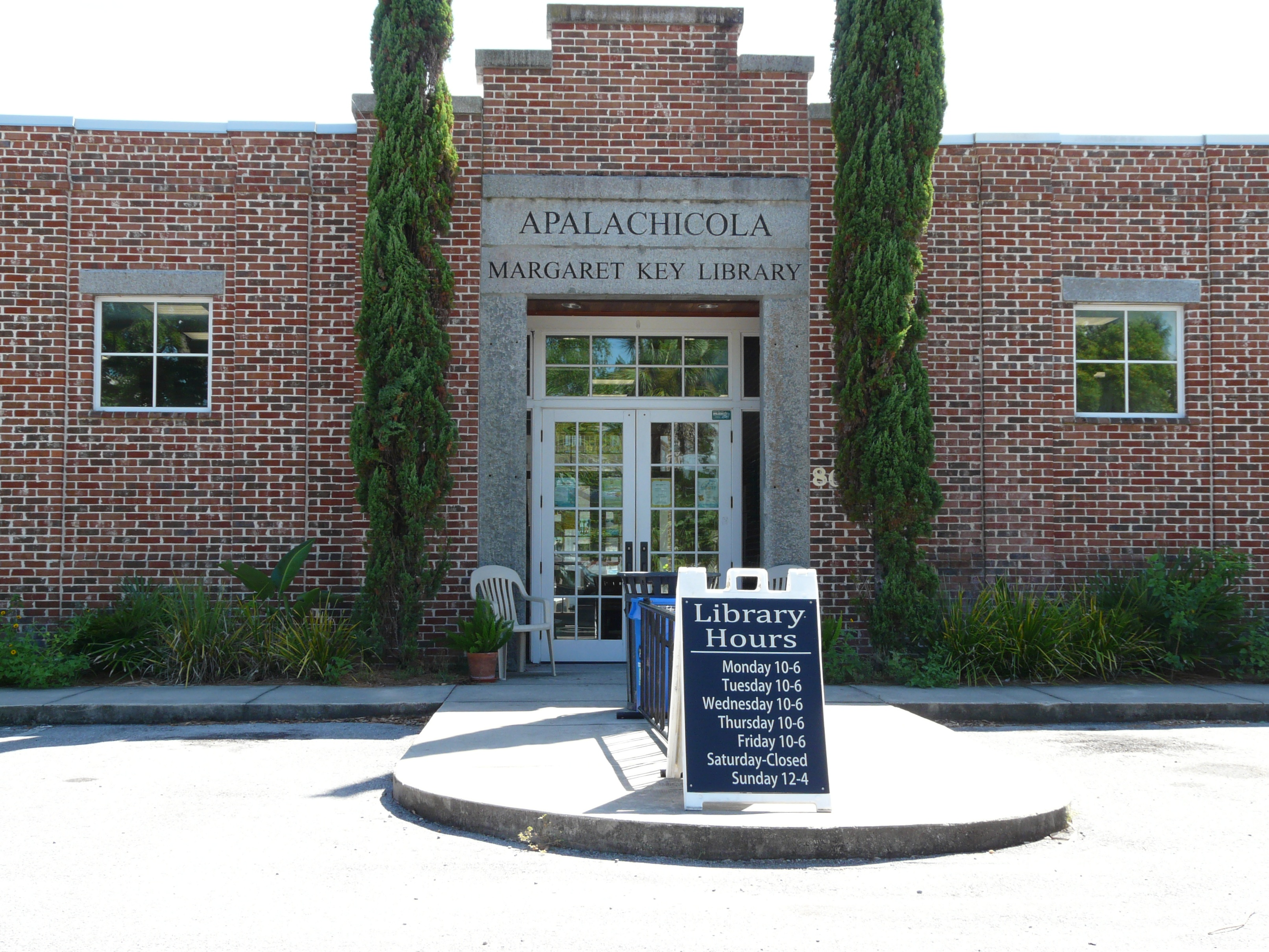
Margaret Key Public Library

Apalachicola is a part of the Franklin County Schools system. As of the 2008–2009 school year, all students, except those attending charter schools, attended the K–12 Franklin County School in Eastpoint.

Apalachicola Bay Charter School is located in Apalachicola.

Former schools:

- Apalachicola High School - It was nicknamed "Apalach". By 2007, the school district had consolidated high school students into the school in Carrabelle, while the Apalachicola campus had grades K–8. The schools in Apalachicola, Carrabelle, and Eastpoint were to be consolidated into the single Franklin County School.
  - In 1975 the school district had plans to establish two shop buildings for the school.
- Apalachicola Middle School
- Chapman Elementary School
- Wallace M. Quinn High School (segregated school for black children)

The library in Apalachicola is the Apalachicola Margaret Key Public Library.

Gulf Coast State College operates the Gulf/Franklin Campus in Port St. Joe in Gulf County.

== Media ==
As of 2026 the headquarters of the newspaper The Star are in Apalachicola. Historically The Times was the newspaper of Apalachicola.

== Notable people ==
- Jimmy Bloodworth, MLB baseball player
- Alvan Wentworth Chapman, botanist
- John Gorrie, inventor of mechanical cooling
- Mary Rogers Gregory, artist
- Richard S. Heyser, U-2 pilot

== Gallery ==
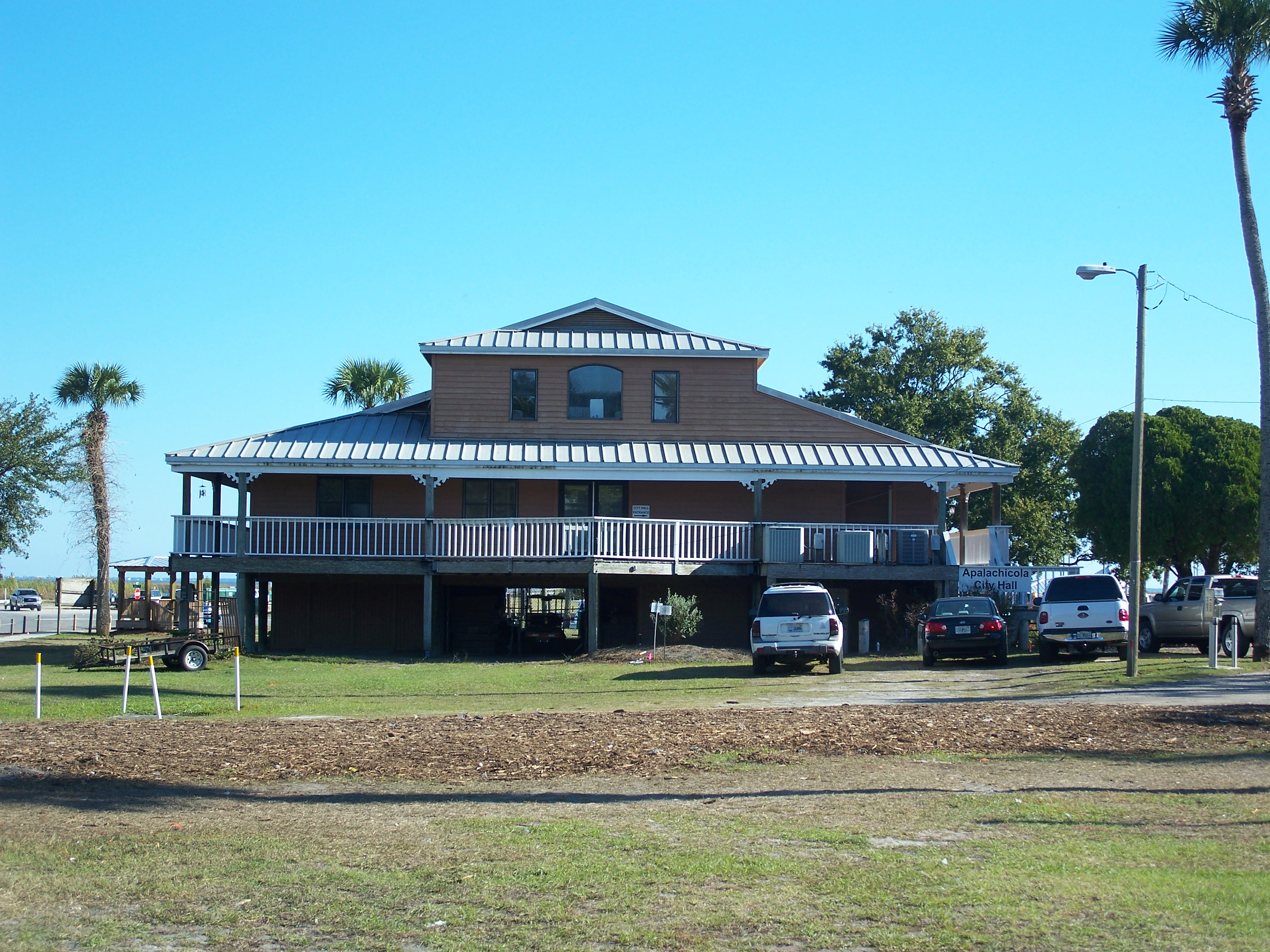
City hall

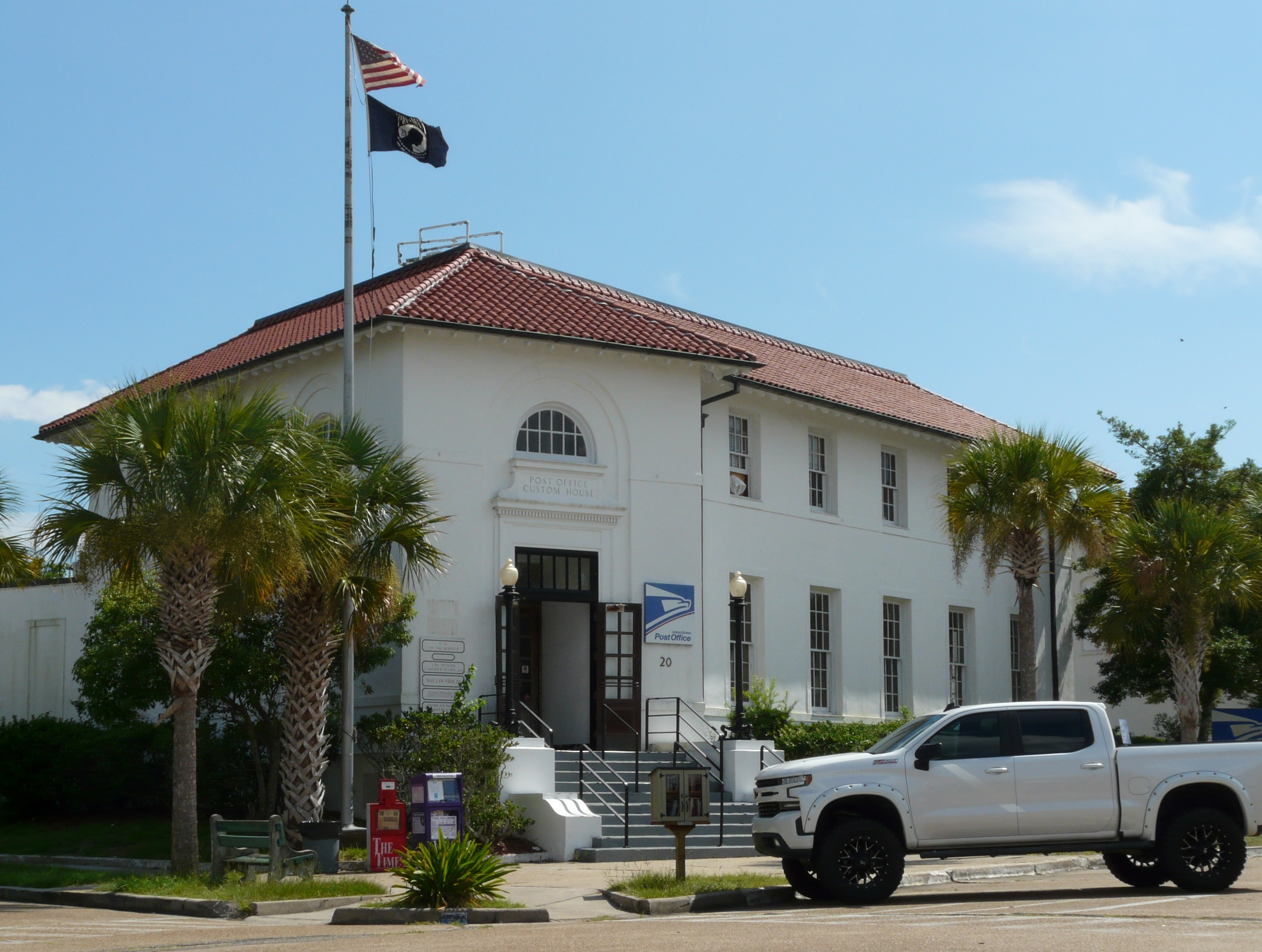
Post office in 2025
