= Mary Rogers Gregory =

American artist

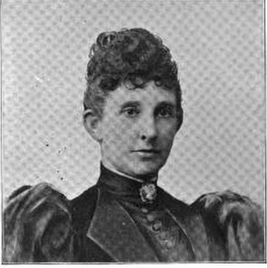
- Born: Mary Bland Rogers; May 6, 1846; Apalachicola, Florida
- Died: 1919 (aged 72–73)
- Known for: portraiture

Mary Rogers Gregory (née Mary Bland Rogers; May 6, 1846 – 1919) was a 19th-century American artist from Florida, specializing in portraiture. She painted portraits of Benjamin Harvey Hill, Judge James M. Jackson, Henry W. Grady, Mary Edwards Bryan, Alexander H. Stephens, and Herschel Vespasian Johnson. Several of her paintings were displayed in the art department of the Cotton States and International Exposition.

== Early years and education ==
Mary Bland Rogers was born in Apalachicola, Florida, May 6, 1846. Her father, Charles Rogers, was a prominent cotton merchant of Columbus, Georgia. Her paternal ancestors were distinguished Revolutionary heroes. Among them were the Platt family of Dutchess County, New York. One of them, Zephadiah Platt, was the first Senator elected by the State of New York to the first Congress of the United States. Another, Richard Platt, was aid-de-camp to General Richard Montgomery at the fall of Quebec. On her mother's side she belonged to the Virginia families of Bland and Spottswood, and she was closely connected with the family of the artist Rembrandt Peale. She became the wife, at an early age, of Dr. John R. Gregory, of Tallahassee, Florida.

== Career ==
Gregory was one of the most distinguished artists of the South. She painted many portraits of prominent men and women. Among her best-known works were portraits of Benjamin Harvey Hill, Judge James M. Jackson, Henry W. Grady, and Mary Edwards Bryan. The legislature of Georgia appointed her to paint the full-length portraits of Alexander H. Stephens and Herschel Vespasian Johnson. These pictures were placed on the walls of the capitol in Atlanta. She also painted a life-size portrait of Hugh McCall, the first historian of Georgia. Gregory had several pictures in the art department of the Cotton States and International Exposition in the Art Building and in the Woman's Building. She held a life membership in the Academy of Fine Arts in Philadelphia, where she studied for several years. She also worked in Cooper Institute and trained under European artists.

She died in 1919.
