= C. Adrian Pillars =

American sculptor

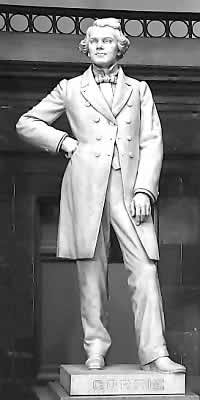
NSHC statue of John Gorrie

Charles Adrian Pillars (1870–1937) was an American sculptor. He chiefly worked in Florida from his studio in St. Augustine.

Pillars was born in Rantoul, Illinois. He studied with Daniel Chester French, Edward Potter and Lorado Taft at the Art Institute of Chicago. He subsequently relocated to St. Augustine, Florida and became a prominent artist in the state. He created the bronze statue of the "winged figure of youth" in Jacksonville's Memorial Park in 1924. He is best known for having two statues, of John Gorrie (1914) and Edmund Kirby Smith (1922), representing Florida in the National Statuary Hall Collection in Washington D.C.
