= Trinity Episcopal Church (Apalachicola, Florida) =

Historic church in Florida, United States

- U.S. National Register of Historic Places
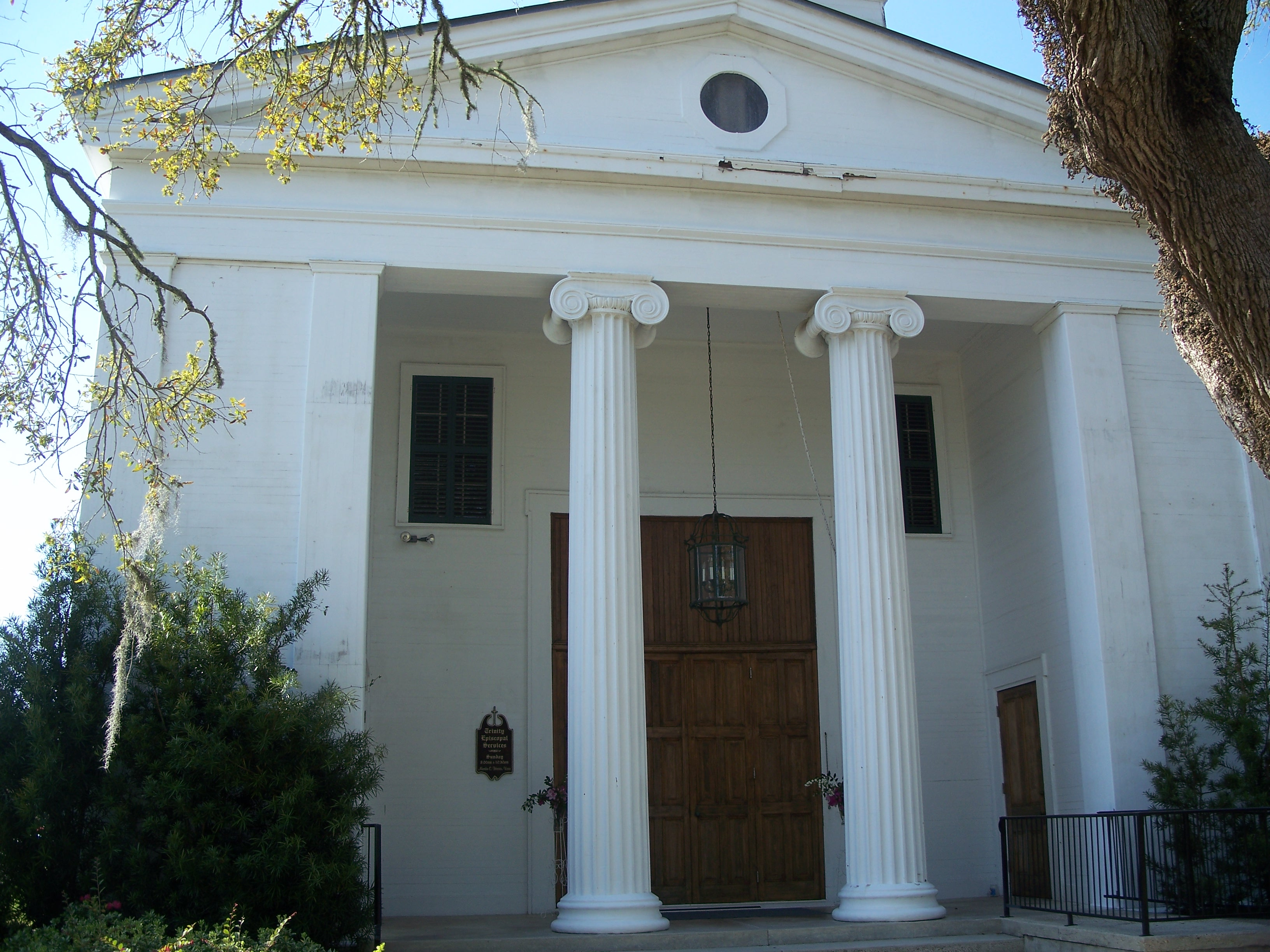
- Trinity Episcopal Church

- Location within Florida Location within the United States
- Location: 79 6th Street; Apalachicola, Florida
- Coordinates: 29.72566°N 84.98612°W
- Built: 1839
- Architectural style: Greek Revival
- NRHP reference No.: 72000317
- Added to NRHP: June 30, 1972

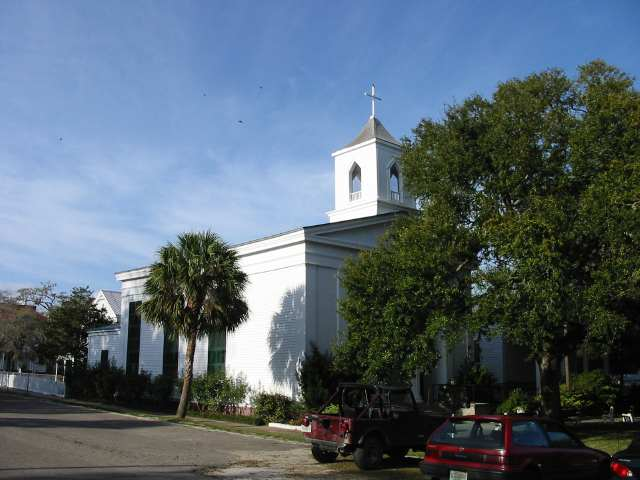
Trinity Episcopal Church

Trinity Episcopal Church, originally known as Christ Church, is a historic house of worship in Apalachicola, Florida, United States, located at the corner of Avenue D and 6th Street (Gorrie Square). On June 30, 1972, it was added to the U.S. National Register of Historic Places.

Begun in 1837 and completed in 1838, the present church was built as a cut to order building in White Plains, New York. It was brought down and around the tip of Florida and assembled like a puzzle on its present site. Trinity was organized in 1836 in the then-territory of Florida, an inhospitable wilderness of swamps and forests where indigenous and enslaved people found haven, and outlaws roamed. It rose from that rough beginning to its status on the National Register of Historic Places and holds the distinction of being the sixth oldest church in Florida and the second oldest continuously serving church. Trinity is proud to be Apalachicola's “Historic First Church”.

== National register listing ==
- Trinity Episcopal Church
- (added 1972 - Building - #72000317)
- Ave. D and 6th St. (Gorrie Sq.), Apalachicola
- Historic Significance: Event, Architecture/Engineering
- Architect, builder, or engineer: Unknown
- Architectural Style: Greek Revival
- Area of Significance: Religion, Architecture
- Period of Significance: 1825–1849
- Owner: Private
- Historic Function: Religion
- Historic Sub-function: Religious Structure
- Current Function: Religion
- Current Sub-function: Religious Structure

== See also ==
National Register of Historic Places listings in Florida
